= City of Charters Towers =

- Local government area
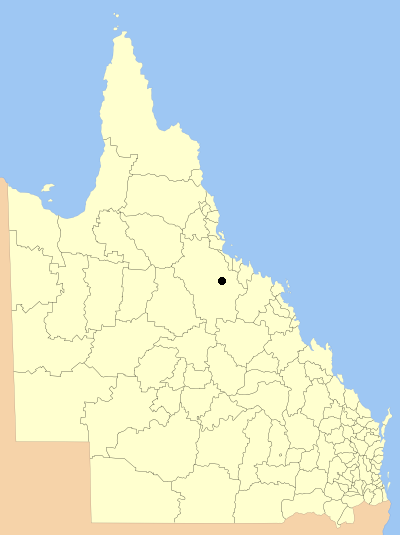
- Location within Queensland

- Country: Australia
- State: Queensland
- Region: North Queensland
- Established: 1877
- Council seat: Charters Towers

Area
  - Total: 42.0 km^{2} (16.2 sq mi)

Population
  - Total: 8,155 (2006 census)
  - Density: 194.17/km^{2} (502.9/sq mi)

The City of Charters Towers was a local government area in North Queensland, Australia, consisting of the centre and suburbs of the town of Charters Towers. Established in 1877, it was entirely surrounded by the Shire of Dalrymple, with which it amalgamated in 2008 to form the Charters Towers Region.

== History ==
The Borough of Charters Towers was proclaimed on 21 June 1877 under the Municipal Institutions Act 1864. It achieved a measure of autonomy in 1878 with the enactment of the Local Government Act. With the passage of the Local Authorities Act 1902, the Borough of Charters Towers became the Town of Charters Towers on 31 March 1903.

On 13 April 1909, Charters Towers was proclaimed a City.

A separate Shire of Queenton was excised from the surrounding Dalrymple Division on 2 July 1902 and merged with the City of Charters Towers on 23 December 1916.

On 15 March 2008, under the Local Government (Reform Implementation) Act 2007 passed by the Parliament of Queensland on 10 August 2007, the City of Charters Towers amalgamated with the Shire of Dalrymple to form the Charters Towers Region.

== Suburbs ==
The City of Charter Towers included the following settlements:

- Alabama Hill
- Columbia
- Grand Secret
- Lissner (later renamed Charters Towers City)
- Millchester
- Mosman Park
- Queenton
- Richmond Hill
- Toll
- Towers Hill

== Population ==
Year	Population
1933	6,978
1947	7,561
1954	6,961
1961	7,633
1966	7,602
1971	7,518
1976	7,914
1981	6,823
1986	7,208
1991	9,016
1996	8,893
2001	8,492
2006	8,155

== Mayors ==
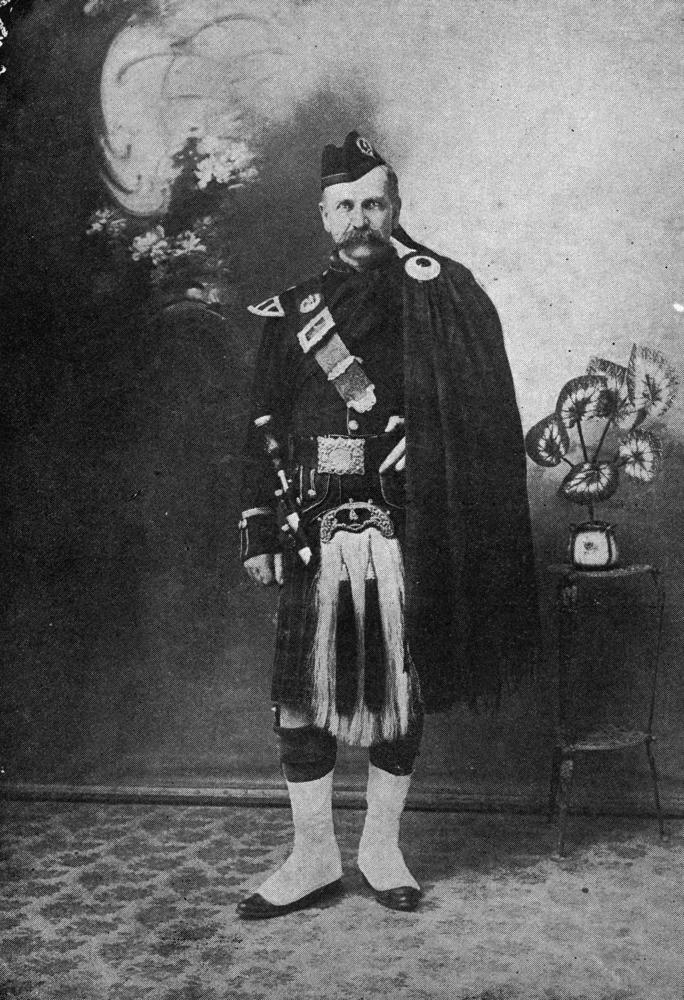
William Grant Clark, Mayor of Charters Towers, wearing the plaid of the hunting Stewart clan, 1908

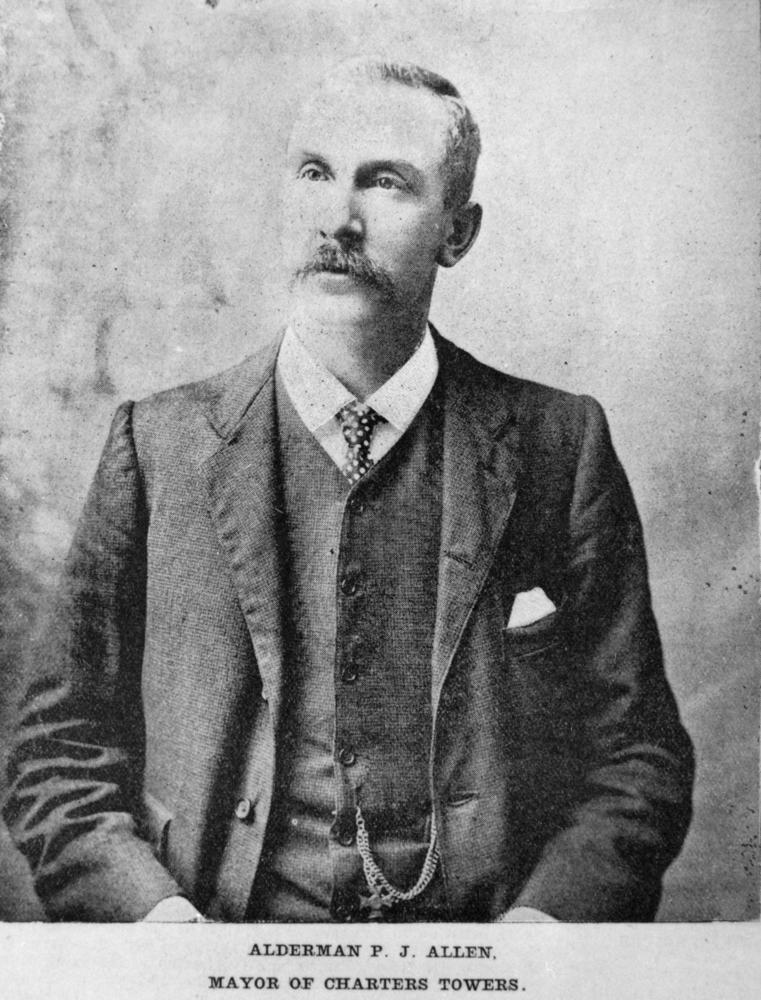
P. J. Allen, Mayor of Charters Towers, 1901

In the early period of local government in Queensland, elections for aldermen were held annually and the mayor was elected from among the aldermen. Later the mayor became directly elected but still on an annual basis. Finally there was the move to three-year election cycles.

- 1877–?: John McDonald
- 1894: Frederick Johnson (son of South Australian politician Thomas Johnson)
- 1897: Edward Miles 1897
- 1901: P. J. Allen
- 1903: Frederick Johnson
- 1908: David Rollston
- 1908: William Grant Clark
- David (Dave) Missingham
- 1913–1914: Frederick Johnson
- 1916: C. Watts
- 1925: Thomas Chappe
- 1927: Charles Brownson
- Bryan Beveridge
