= Breddan Aerodrome =

Australian World War II Air Force Base

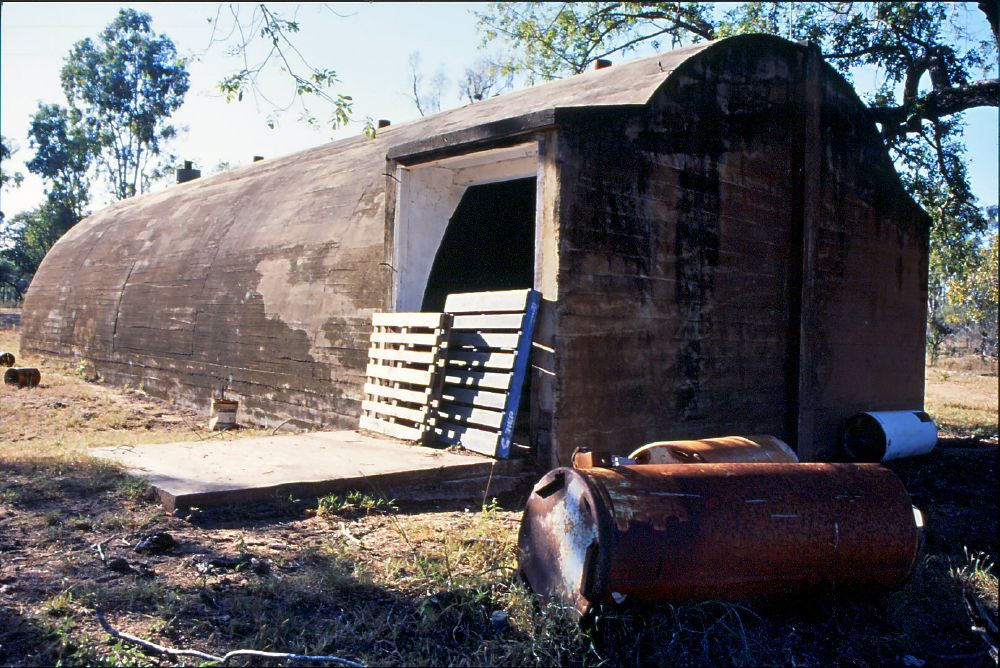
- Abandoned concrete igloo, Breddan Airfield

- Location within Queensland
- 19.9424°S 146.2543°E
- Location: Gregory Developmental Road, Breddan, Charters Towers Region, Queensland, Australia

History
- Built: 1942-43

Queensland Heritage Register
- Official name: Breddan Airfield, Breddan WWII Aircraft Maintenance, Repair and Salvage Depot
- Type: state heritage (built)
- Designated: 16 April 2010
- Reference no.: 602745
- Significant period: 1942-1945
- Builders: Allied Works Council, Main Roads Commission

Breddan Aerodrome is a heritage-listed abandoned aerodrome at Gregory Developmental Road, Breddan, Charters Towers Region, Queensland, Australia. It is located 15 kilometres (9.3 mi) north of Charters Towers. It was built from 1942 to 1943 by Allied Works Council and Queensland Main Roads Commission. The airfield was constructed for the USAAF 38th Bomb Group in August 1942 as a satellite field for Charters Towers Airport, and later used by the Royal Australian Air Force (RAAF) during World War II as a maintenance base. Consisting of two runways, the airfield was abandoned after 1948. Today, the remains of the airfield consist of some deteriorating runways, taxiways and hardstands, mostly being reclaimed by grassland and shrub. No buildings have survived. It is also known as Breddan Airfield and Breddan WWII Aircraft Maintenance, Repair and Salvage Depot. It was added to the Queensland Heritage Register on 16 April 2010.

== History ==
Breddan airfield, located about 13 kilometres (8.1 mi) north of Charters Towers, was initially constructed as a dispersal field for Charters Towers airfield during April 1942. In August 1942 Breddan was occupied by two squadrons of the US 38th Bombardment Group. On the departure of the US squadrons Breddan was chosen for development as a major aircraft repair and salvage depot under RAAF control. The construction program which took place during 1943 involved the erection of maintenance hangars, engineering workshops, torpedo stores, personnel camps, a power station and medical facilities. The base was abandoned after 1947.

As early as July 1941 the RAAF had ordered a survey of the Charters Towers district to identify sites for airfields to accommodate heavy bombers and combat aircraft. An initial survey was undertaken during September resulting in the identification of suitable airfield sites at Corinda (Charters Towers), Sandy Creek (Breddan) and several locations near Sellheim.

On 7 December 1941 the Japanese made a surprise attack on the US naval base at Pearl Harbor in the Hawaiian Islands. At the same time Japanese forces launched assaults on Thailand, the Philippines and the British colony of Malaya. Three days after Pearl Harbor, two capital ships of the Royal Navy were sunk off the coast of Malaya. This gave the Japanese almost total control of the seas to Australia's north. The sudden fall of Singapore on 15 February 1942 and the rapid, unchecked Japanese advance through the islands of the Netherlands East Indies raised fears of the invasion of Australia and attacks on Queensland bases.

Charters Towers was the closest inland centre that could provide strategic support and aircraft dispersal facilities for the main North Eastern Area air base at Garbutt, Townsville, which was considered vulnerable to Japanese attack. The RAAF ordered commencement of preliminary work on an aerodrome at Charters Towers during January 1942. By early February Charters Towers airfield had been accorded high priority and Main Roads Commission engineers were engaged to supervise the clearing and construction of two gravel runways. The work was completed during March in readiness for the arrival of the United States Army Air Force 3rd Bombardment Group (Light).

Arrival of the US 3 BG(L) at Charters Towers saw the need for dispersal strips in the vicinity and the revival of the earlier investigation of the Sandy Creek airfield site north of the town. A second dispersal strip was planned at Southern Cross, a gold mining area to the west of the town.

Under MRC supervision, clearing and construction of an airfield at the Sandy Creek location on the northern inland road connecting Charters Towers with the Atherton Tableland, began on 10 April 1942. The new airfield was named Breddan, presumably after Breddan Pastoral Holding belonging to Archibald Truscott and John Henry Bryant of Five Mile Creek. Completion of a gravel east–west runway was the priority, with clearing of a second north–south runway to follow. Dauntless dive bombers of 3 BG(L) arrived at Charters Towers in late March 1942 and some aircraft may have been dispersed to Breddan during April.

On 26 May, after discussions with the RAAF North Eastern Area Command, the USAAF decided that a heavy bombardment role proposed for Charters Towers airfield, would be transferred to Breddan, with torpedo workshops established between Charters Towers and Breddan. It was initially planned that when the US bombardment squadrons vacated Charters Towers, the airfield facilities would be occupied by a RAAF aircraft repair and salvage unit. With the US victory at Midway Island in early June, much of the proposed airfield construction program west of Charters Towers was abandoned. For Breddan the plan became one of completing both runways to gravelled stage and the erection of workshops and camp facilities.

By June a major construction program had commenced at Breddan with the erection of approximately 40 buildings which by July were noted to be urgently in need of camouflage painting. The buildings included an aircraft repair section workshop, a motor transport workshop near the southern entrance and camp facilities (No.1 Camp). The Allied Works Council (AWC) was responsible for contracting the building program. By late July Breddan was occupied by the RAAF No.12 Repair and Salvage Unit and ground crew of the USAAF 38th Bombardment Group (Medium).

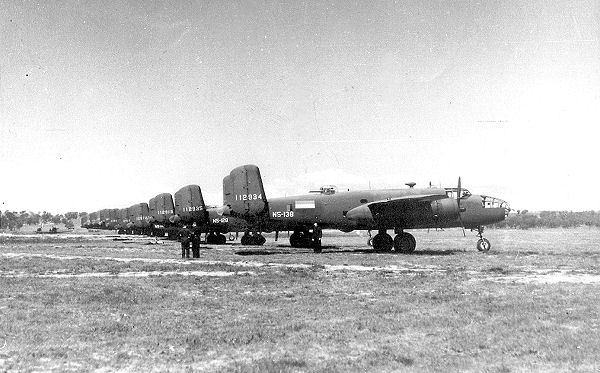
8th Bombardment Squadron - B-25Cs, 1942

On 22 August the 71st and 405th squadrons of the US 38 BG(M) arrived at Breddan after leaving Hawaii on 25 July and flying their B-25 Mitchell bombers across the Pacific Ocean. Their aircraft were combat ready on arrival and reunification with the ground crews who had reached Australia by sea. The main east-west Runway 60 was bitumen sealed by 22 August when most of the B-25 bombers arrived. The north- south second runway running parallel with a straight section of the northern inland road, was not completed.

The AWC contracted the construction of a USAAF camp at Breddan which was in the course of erection by 22 September when the US Base Section ordered that no further work be done on the camp. The Base Section also ordered that the main runway facilities be completed, but that all work on the second runway should be abandoned. The second runway later served as an aircraft taxiway for the northern repair and maintenance workshops.

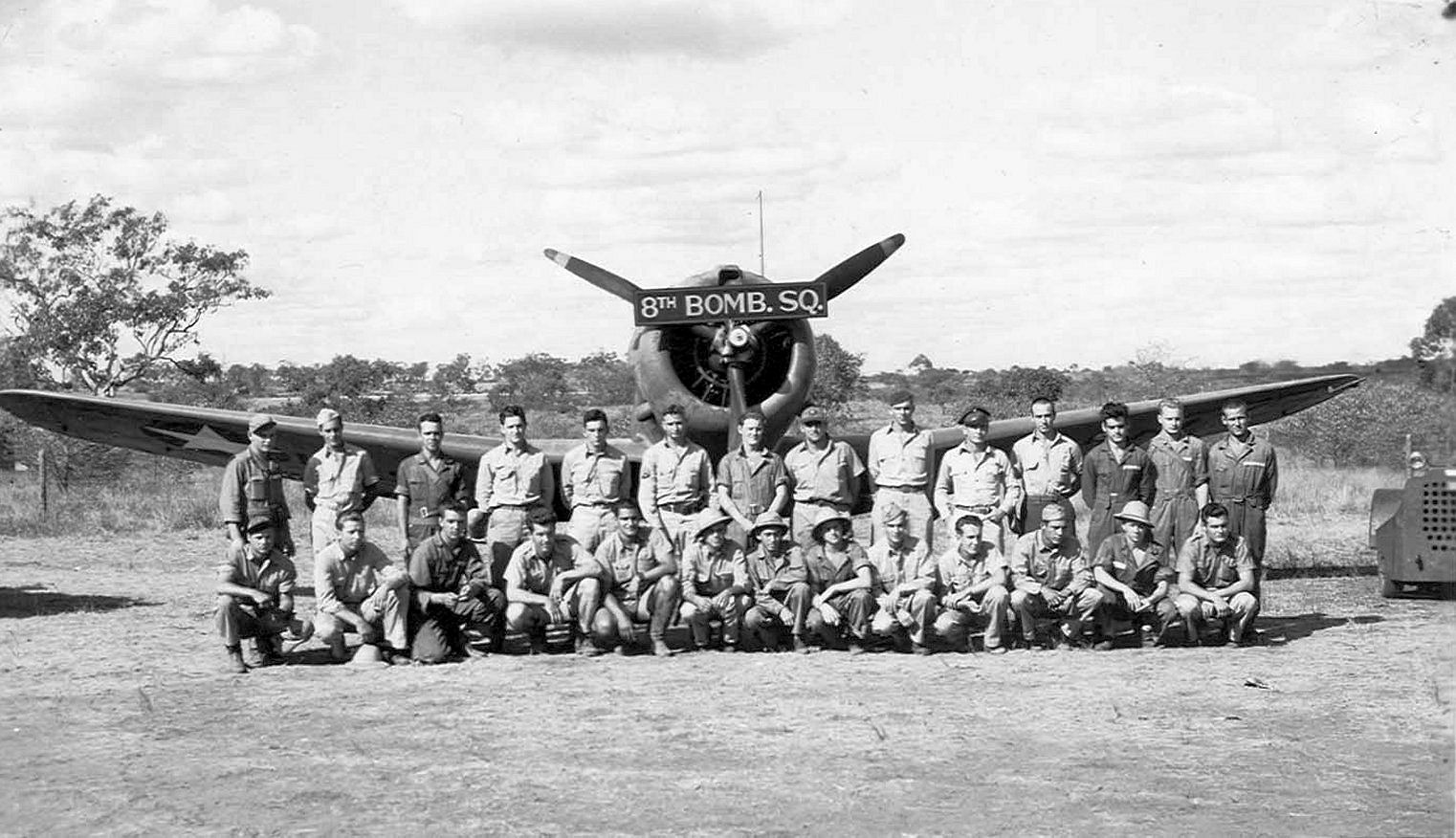
8th Bombardment Squadron - A-24, 1942

By early October the 71st and 405th squadrons of the US 38 BG(M) had been posted to Townsville and Breddan was chosen for development as a major aircraft repair and salvage depot under RAAF control, based around No.12 Repair and Salvage Unit and No.6 Aircraft Repair Depot, RAAF. For this reason winding dispersal taxiways were considered unnecessary. The facilities required would include engineering workshops.

RAAF No.1 Torpedo Maintenance Unit was established at Breddan on 18 November 1942 and an order was placed with the AWC for construction of facilities for the unit including reinforced concrete igloo shelters for the storage of torpedoes and torpedo war heads. Ten reinforced concrete storage buildings for No.1 TMU were completed by June 1943 when provision was made for their camouflage.

RAAF No.6 ARD departed from Breddan during December 1942 and arrival of an advance party of No.13 ARD marked the beginning of a significant building program. RAAF No.13 ARD found a number of important building works were outstanding on their arrival at Breddan and the advance party were given the role of erecting their own workshops and stores as their first major task at the base. On 20 January 1943 the AWC was asked to proceed with construction of 11 buildings as part of the Breddan ARD Scheme. Buildings ordered comprised: salvage hangar, propeller testing building, armament hut, electroplating shop, battery hut, motor transport store and office, and four headquarters buildings. The workshops included a number of prefabricated steel frame Bellman hangars. Up to six Bellman hangars may have been erected at Breddan by the end of World War II.

AWC minutes for 18 February 1943 include an approval to proceed with the fabrication of four "American Type Hangars" 95 by 45 feet (29 by 14 m) galvanised iron covered steel workshop buildings which had been reconstructed in Melbourne. These buildings were also erected by the advance personnel of No.13 ARD. Throughout this period units of No.12 RSU, RAAF, continued operating from Breddan.

During 1943 the AWC were asked to organise an intensive program of building construction at Breddan which received a substantial allocation of funds to cover the works. The following works were ordered during the first half of the year: a hospital sick bay near the No.2 Camp, with a treatment room and medical officer's hut; a barracks store and officers' mess for No.1 TMU; motor transport engine repair and body chassis workshops; aircraft dismantling hangars; gun firing platform and test butts.

Work on No.1 Camp to hold 350 personnel was completed during May by which period work was also nearing completion on No.2 Camp to hold 400 men. The building construction work was undertaken by Civil Construction Corps labour. During June orders were lodged by the Department of Air for construction of a post office, canteen, ethylene glycol reclamation hut, WAAAF camp, dental clinic, squadron air depot, cool room and duty pilot's tower. Orders were also placed for the sealing of taxiways and supply of an air conditioning unit for the instrument repair workshop. By October 1943 provision of hutted camp accommodation for WAAAF personnel had been accorded priority for construction.

To avoid dependency on power supply from Charters Towers a reinforced concrete sub-station building was commenced about June to hold a 25 KVA diesel electric generating plant. The power station was scheduled for completion in September.

Workshops and barracks were sufficiently established by August 1943 to allow the main contingent of No.13 ARD to make the move from Tocumwal (NSW) to Breddan. In December 1943 No.12 RSU departed from Breddan for Kiriwina in New Guinea. No.6 Central Recovery Depot, RAAF, was established at Breddan in June 1944.

RAAF units based at Breddan airfield during World War II were No.12 RSU, No. 10 RSU, No.6 ARD, No.13 ARD, No.1 TMU and No.6 CRD. At its largest in late 1943 a total of 1200 personnel were accommodated on the base.

On the evening of Wednesday 28 June 1944, on return from a Breddan Ball dance at the Catholic Club Hall near RAAF Breddan, a traffic crash occurred 3 miles (4.8 km) south of the base which resulted in sixteen service personnel injured, and the deaths of Flight Lieutenant Bernard Barty, Corporal Thelma McConnell, and ACW Estelle Scaroni, and the later death of Sergeant Mary Wynack. The collision was between two RAAF and army motor transports. The members were buried with full service honours in the Charters Towers Cemetery (Military Section) on 30 June 1944.

The RAAF continued to operate from Breddan after World War II and the last unit, No.13 ARD, departed in November 1947. The base was closed by 1948. All workshop and camp facilities were later removed and the property turned over to pastoral use.

== Units based at Breddan Aerodrome ==
- 38th Bombardment Group (Headquarters) (7 August-30 September 1942)
- 71st Bombardment Squadron, B-25 Mitchell (12 August-1 October 1942)
- 405th Bombardment Squadron, B-25 Mitchell (7 August-30 September 1942)
- No. 1 Torpedo Maintenance Unit RAAF
- No. 6 Central Receiving Depot RAAF
- No. 10 Repair and Salvage Unit RAAF
- No. 12 Repair and Salvage Unit RAAF
- No. 13 Aircraft Repair Depot RAAF

== Description ==
Breddan Airfield is located about 13 kilometres (8.1 mi) north of Charters Towers on the Gregory Developmental Road. The place contains a number of component areas associated with its wartime operation.

=== Runways and Duty Pilot's Tower Base ===
The bitumen sealed east-west Runway 60 degrees extends east of the Gregory Developmental Road for about two kilometres in length. The unfinished north-south Runway 20 degrees, remains evident as a regrowth area and former wartime taxiway running parallel with the road. Other taxiways extend north and west from Runway 60 to workshop sites of the Airframe Repair Section, General Engineering Section and Engine Repair Section. The duty pilot's tower is located at the western end of Runway 60. The site comprises a concrete slab, possibly an office floor, with four concrete tower footings at each corner, each containing two steel members to which the base of the tower was attached with bolts.

=== Airframe Repair Section ===
The Airframe Repair Section, located to the west of the Gregory Developmental Road, contains the concrete floors of at least seven workshops and hangars including the base of a cantilever hangar. An earth butt for gun testing is located near the cantilever hangar. Other workshop surfaces were designed for Bellman hangars. Several concrete tie down blocks for aircraft remain.

=== General Engineering Section ===
The General Engineering Section, located between the east-west Runway 60 and the unfinished north–south runway, contains concrete floors of at least seven workshops and hangars. Three Bellman hangar floors are evident, including an instrument repair shop and a lathe workshop. An electroplating workshop can be identified by two concrete channels running the length of the floor surface. The GES also included an armature winding shop.

=== Engine Repair Section ===
The Engine Repair Section, located north of the GES, contains concrete floor surfaces for six workshops including a number of Bellman hangars. From south to north the six ERS workshop slabs are identified as: Receipt and Despatch Shop, Engine Inspection and Dismantling Shop, Stripping and Cleaning Shop, Blacksmith Shop with Retort Furnace, Final Assembly Shop, and Propeller Maintenance Shop. Two other ERS workshop floor surfaces, including an engine running shed with steel tie down bolts, are located on the west side of the Gregory Developmental Road.

=== Motor Transport Section ===
The site of the Motor Transport Repair and Engine Overhaul Section is located south of Runway 60, at the entrance to the airfield. At least three MT workshops are shown on a wartime plan of the base. The site of No.2 Camp is located nearby.

=== Torpedo Maintenance Unit ===
The Torpedo Maintenance Unit stores are located apart from the engineering workshops in the south east sector of the airfield complex. The TMU stores consist of ten reinforced concrete igloos of two types. Seven torpedo maintenance stores are spaced apart over about a kilometre forming a rough oval. These reinforced concrete buildings, 16 metres (52 ft) in length by 6.8 metres (22 ft) in width, are designed with two entrances at one end and a semi-circular formwork concrete roof reaching about 4 metres (13 ft) in height. The roofs contain ventilation holes and steel bolts for securing camouflage nets. Three reinforced concrete torpedo warhead stores are spaced apart in gullies further to the south east of the maintenance igloos. The warhead stores are designed with a single entrance at the centre of the buildings with a reinforced concrete portico above. The stores are about 7 metres (23 ft) in length, 6.50 metres (21.3 ft) in width and 3.5 metres (11 ft) in height. All are equipped with ventilation holes in the roofs, bolts for securing camouflage nets and contain evidence of wartime ochre and green camouflage paint.

=== Torpedo Maintenance Unit Camp ===
The Torpedo Maintenance Unit camp, located at the north east end of Runway 60, contains a small reinforced concrete igloo building which served as a generator shed. The camp area also includes the concrete floor and oven base of a mess and kitchen, and a small stone structure thought to have been a water heater or incinerator.

=== Power House and Hospital ===
A power house and hospital sick bay are located south of Runway 60 near the southern boundary of the airfield. The power house is constructed with 5.5 metres (18 ft) high reinforced concrete walls. The internal concrete floor surface contains footings and channels for a diesel engine, alternator and cabling to a distribution board. A reinforced concrete switching room is attached at one end of the building which totals 16.2 metres (53 ft) in length and 6 metres (20 ft) in width. A reinforced concrete inground cooling tank is situated at the north west end of the building. The hospital foundations comprise concrete floor surfaces and concrete footings that may have supported a timber floor surface.

=== Reinforced Concrete Building and No.1 Camp ===
North of Runway 60 at its eastern end is a reinforced concrete building of seven rooms covered with a flat concrete roof. The building is 10.90 metres (35.8 ft) in length by 8 metres (26 ft) in width and includes a toilet. An eroded earth traverse wall once protected the entrance doorway. The purpose of the building is uncertain. It may have been constructed as a signals station or a medical aid post, and may have later been used for secure storage.

The site of No.1 Camp covers an area of the airfield extending north from the east end of Runway 60. Archaeological evidence of an open air picture theatre includes concrete lined post holes for a projection box and a scatter of metal slide holders. Several large concrete floor surfaces of former stores buildings are located north of the runway, nearby.

== Heritage listing ==
Breddan Airfield was listed on the Queensland Heritage Register on 16 April 2010 having satisfied the following criteria.

The place is important in demonstrating the evolution or pattern of Queensland's history.

Breddan Airfield is significant as a major World War II maintenance, repair and salvage base, being developed as one of the largest RAAF aircraft and motor transport engineering repair facilities in north Queensland.

The place demonstrates rare, uncommon or endangered aspects of Queensland's cultural heritage.

Breddan Airfield demonstrates rare and uncommon aspects of Queensland's cultural heritage with the only known structural evidence of a World War II Torpedo Maintenance Depot, containing 12 reinforced concrete igloo stores for the storage of torpedoes and torpedo war heads.

The place has potential to yield information that will contribute to an understanding of Queensland's history.

Breddan Airfield has potential to yield archaeological information that will contribute to an understanding of Queensland's history with particular regard to the layout of camp and workshop surface elements that remain comparatively undisturbed.

The place is important in demonstrating the principal characteristics of a particular class of cultural places.

Breddan Airfield is important in demonstrating the principal characteristics of a major World War II maintenance, repair and salvage base in north Queensland, containing structural and archaeological evidence including workshop and hangar concrete floors, wartime sealed runway and taxiways, camp installations, reinforced concrete buildings, and torpedo maintenance facilities.

The place is important in demonstrating the principal characteristics of particular types of World War II structures, including a power house, propeller maintenance workshop, electro plating workshop, cantilever hangars, torpedo maintenance and torpedo war head stores.

== See also ==
- United States Army Air Forces in Australia (World War II)
- List of airports in Queensland
