= Southern Cross, Queensland =

Southern Cross
- Suburb
- Interactive map of Southern Cross
- Coordinates: 20.0144°S 146.1672°E
- Country: Australia
- State: Queensland
- LGA: Charters Towers Region
- Location: 3.8 km (2.4 mi) W of Charters Towers CBD; 140 km (87 mi) SW of Townsville; 1,309 km (813 mi) NNW of Brisbane

Government
  - State electorate: Traeger
  - Federal division: Kennedy

Area
  - Total: 350.7 km^{2} (135.4 sq mi)

Population
  - Total: 575 (2021 census)
  - Density: 1.6396/km^{2} (4.246/sq mi)
- Time zone: UTC+10:00 (AEST)
- Postcode: 4820
Suburbs around Southern Cross
Basalt	Basalt	Breddan
Basalt	Southern Cross	Breddan
Basalt	Black Jack	Toll; Grand Secret; Alabama Hill; Towers Hill

Southern Cross is a rural locality in the Charters Towers Region, Queensland, Australia. In the 2021 census, Southern Cross had a population of 575 people.

== Geography ==
The locality is mainly rural, except for a small area in the south-east which adjoins the city of Charters Towers. This area is best described as rural-residential.

== History ==
The former railway station of Southern Cross, on the Great Northern railway line, which was opened in 1884, was just over the boundary in the locality of Black Jack, Queensland. A 1,122-metre (3,681 ft) crossing loop is located in the immediate vicinity.

Southern Cross Provisional School opened circa 1895. On 1 January 1909, it became Southern Cross State School. It closed circa 1932.

== Demographics ==
In the 2016 census, Southern Cross had a population of 542 people.

In the 2021 census, Southern Cross had a population of 575 people.

== Education ==
There are no schools in Southern Cross. The nearest government primary schools are Charters Towers Central State School in Charters Towers CBD and Richmond Hill State School in Richmond Hill, both to the south-east. The nearest government secondary school is Charters Towers State High School in the Charters Towers CBD.
