= Basalt, Queensland =

Basalt
- Suburb
- Interactive map of Basalt
- Coordinates: 19.7405°S 145.2538°E
- Country: Australia
- State: Queensland
- LGA: Charters Towers Region
- Location: 95.6 km (59.4 mi) NW of Charters Towers; 142 km (88 mi) WSW of Townsville; 1,404 km (872 mi) NNW of Brisbane

Government
  - State electorate: Traeger
  - Federal division: Kennedy

Area
  - Total: 14,006.3 km^{2} (5,407.9 sq mi)

Population
  - Total: 215 (2021 census)
  - Density: 0.01535/km^{2} (0.03976/sq mi)
- Time zone: UTC+10:00 (AEST)
- Postcode: 4820
Suburbs around Basalt
Lyndhurst	Greenvale; Valley of Lagoons	Paluma
Porcupine	Basalt	Dotswood
Pentland	Homestead; Campaspe	Breddan; Southern Cross; Black Jack

Basalt is a rural locality in the Charters Towers Region, Queensland, Australia. In the 2021 census, Basalt had a population of 215 people.

== Geography ==
In the north and west lies the Clarke River. The Burdekin River drains the south where a confluence of waterways meet. Dalrymple National Park was established along the Burdekin in 1990. The Great Basalt Wall National Park is in the south-west of the locality in two sections.

The area has road access via the Gregory Developmental Road. The Hervey Range Developmental Road enters from the east to intersect the Gregory Highway.

The now-closed Greenvale railway line passed through the locality with Tulay railway station now abandoned (19.2354°S 145.6572°E).

Apart from the protected areas, the land use is grazing on native vegetation.

== Demographics ==
In the 2011 census, Basalt had a population of 229 people.

In the 2016 census, Basalt had a population of 190 people.

In the 2021 census, Basalt had a population of 215 people.

== Heritage listings ==
There are a number of heritage sites in Basalt, including:

- Lolworth Creek Battery
- Bluff Downs Station: Hann Family Grave

== Education ==
There are no schools in Basalt. For students living in the south-east of locality, the nearest government primary schools are Richmond Hill State School in the suburb of Richmond Hill in Charters Towers to the south-east, Charters Towers Central State School in the Charters Towers CBD to the south-east, and Homestead State School in Homestead, also to the south-east. For students in the south-east of the locality, the nearest government secondary school is Charters Towers State High School in the Charters Towers CBD.

For students in the rest of the locality, there are no nearby schools. The options are distance education and boarding school.
