= Shire of Dalrymple =

- Local government area
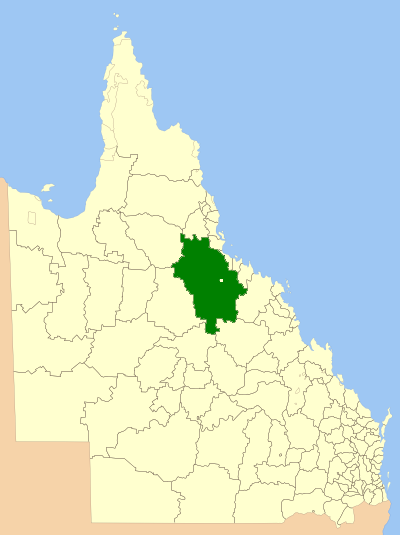
- Location within Queensland

- Country: Australia
- State: Queensland
- Region: North Queensland
- Established: 1879
- Council seat: Charters Towers

Area
  - Total: 68,324.5 km^{2} (26,380.2 sq mi)

Population
  - Total: 3,782 (2006 census)
  - Density: 0.055353/km^{2} (0.143365/sq mi)
LGAs around Shire of Dalrymple
Etheridge	Herberton	Hinchinbrook
Flinders	Shire of Dalrymple	Thuringowa, Townsville
Aramac	Belyando	Burdekin, Bowen

The Shire of Dalrymple was a local government area located in North Queensland, Australia, and surrounded but did not include the town of Charters Towers, at which its council and administrative centre was based. It covered an area of 68,324.5 square kilometres (26,380.2 sq mi), and existed as a local government entity from 1879 until 2008, when it amalgamated with the separate City of Charters Towers to form the Charters Towers Region.

== History ==
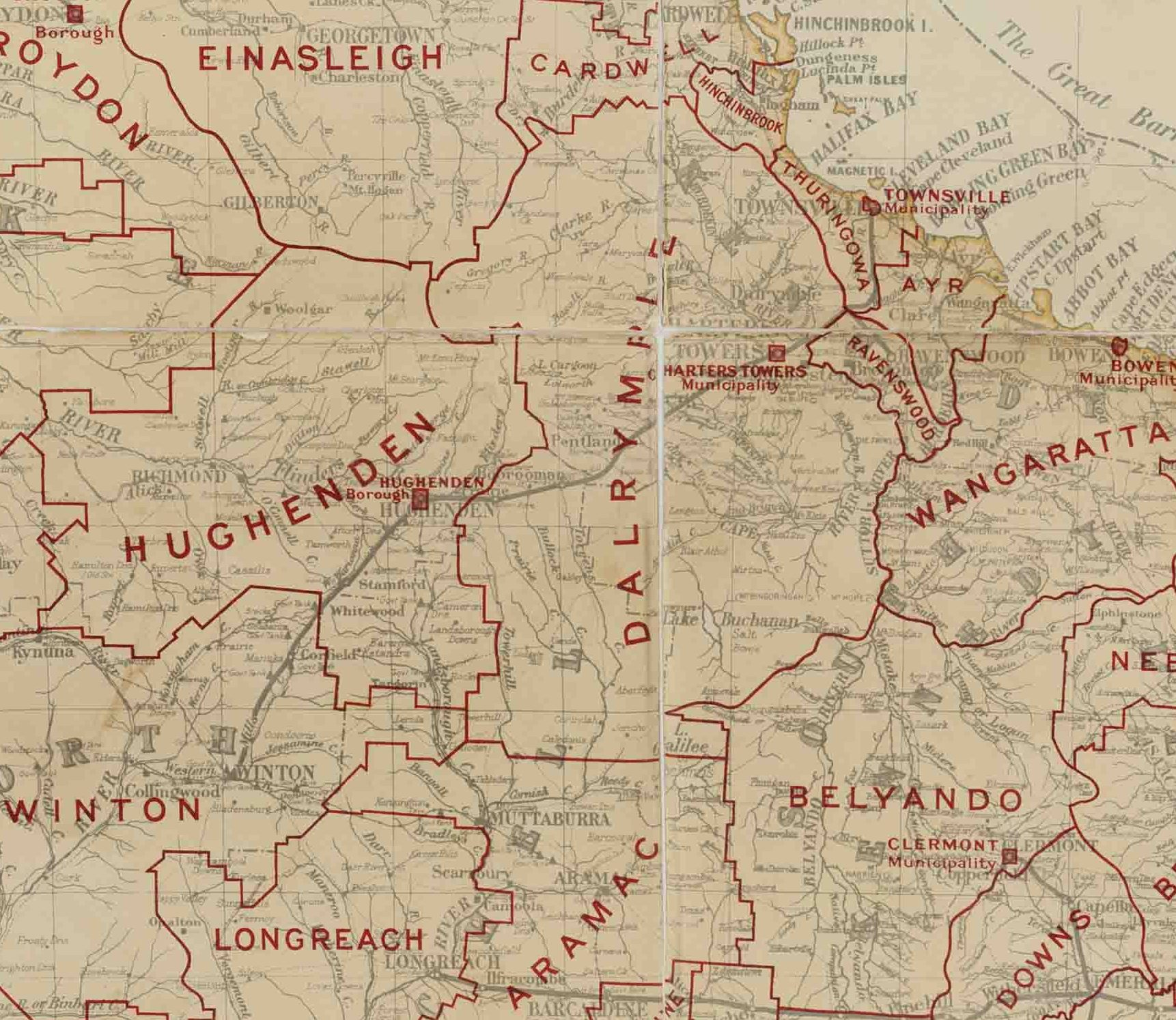
Map of Dalymple Division and adjacent local government areas, March 1902

Dalrymple Division was created on 11 November 1879 as one of 74 divisions around Queensland under the Divisional Boards Act 1879 with a population of 4494. The name Dalrymple is believed to honour George Elphinstone Dalrymple, an early explorer of the region.

On 2 July 1902, the No. 1 subdivision of Dalrymple Division was excised to create a separate Shire of Queenton.

With the passage of the Local Authorities Act 1902, Dalrymple Division became the Shire of Dalrymple on 31 March 1903.

On 1 January 1930, the Shire of Ravenswood was abolished and absorbed into the Shire of Dalrymple as its No. 3 division.

On 15 March 2008, under the Local Government (Reform Implementation) Act 2007 passed by the Parliament of Queensland on 10 August 2007, the Shire of Dalrymple amalgamated with the separate City of Charters Towers to form the Charters Towers Region.

== Towns and localities ==
The Shire of Dalrymple included the following settlements:

- Basalt
- Black Jack
- Breddan
- Campaspe
- Crimea
- Dotswood
- Greenvale
- Hervey Range
- Homestead
- Llanarth
- Macrossan
- Mingela
- Paluma
- Pentland
- Ravenswood
- Sellheim
- Valley of Lagoons

== Chairmen ==
- 1880—1884: John Horace Deane, also Member of the Queensland Legislative Assembly for Townsville and Member of the Queensland Legislative Council
- 1890: John Horace Deane
- 1908: Thomas Sydney Markham
- 1919—1920: John Jones, also Member of the Queensland Legislative Assembly for Kennedy
- 1927: Arthur Shepherd

== Population ==
Year	Population
1933	3,260
1947	2,311
1954	1,914
1961	2,206
1966	2,003
1971	2,278
1976	2,580
1981	3,338
1986	4,252
1991	3,484
1996	3,669
2001	3,853
2006	3,782
