= Ravenswood Ambulance Station =

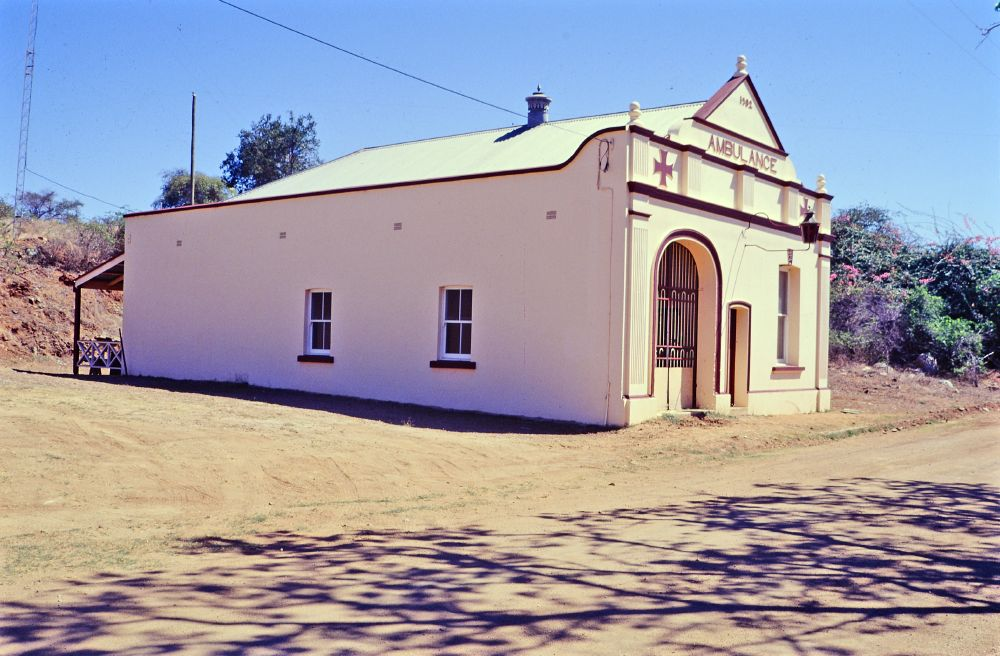
- Ravenswood Ambulance Station, 1997

- Location within Queensland Location within Australia
- 20.1006°S 146.8885°E
- Location: Deighton Street, Ravenswood, Charters Towers Region, Queensland, Australia

History
- Design period: 1900–1914 (early 20th century)
- Built: 1904

Queensland Heritage Register
- Official name: Ravenswood Ambulance Station, Ambulance Building
- Type: state heritage (built)
- Designated: 21 October 1992
- Reference no.: 600445
- Significant period: 1904 (fabric); 1904–ongoing (historical)

Ravenswood Ambulance Station is a heritage-listed ambulance station at Deighton Street, Ravenswood, Charters Towers Region, Queensland, Australia. It was built in 1904. It was added to the Queensland Heritage Register on 21 October 1992.

== History ==
The Ravenswood Ambulance Building, constructed in 1904 by Ravenswood builder Hans Thomsen, has played an important role in the Ravenswood community providing assistance for the sick and injured. This role expanded when the hospital closed and it has continued its community service as a venue for regular clinics held by the Royal Flying Doctor Service for over thirty years.

Ravenswood was one of several important goldfields in which formed a major component in the development of North Queensland. The need to access and exploit gold finds determined the path of railways, the establishment of related industries and commerce and the location of settlements. Some of these were short lived "rushes", where tent and shanty townships disappeared almost as quickly as they rose. Other settlements based on goldfields became established towns with government and civic buildings, shops and family homes and survived as such. A few became important centres, only to fade away as gold yields fell. Ravenswood was one of these.

The area was first settled by Europeans following the establishment of Bowen in 1861. Pastoral runs were soon set up in the hinterland, including the area on which the Ravenswood field was to develop. The first gold in north Queensland had been found at Star River in 1865 and triggered further exploration. Gold was found at Merri Merriwa, the run on which the town of Ravenswood stands, in 1867, although it was reported as being on the adjoining property of Ravenswood, the name by which the field was always known.

Much of the gold initially found was in a triangle in and around three dry creeks which soon formed the focus for a tent and shanty settlement. Ravenswood gold was in reefs and a small battery was first set up in 1869, followed by the Lady Marian Mill in 1870. The settlement was also surveyed at this time, but by then the goldfield itself, and the buildings and streets already established had shaped the town and the survey merely formalised what was already in place. This can still be seen clearly in the irregularity of the major streets. Ravenswood was gazetted as a town in 1871, but problems were soon encountered as the gold at deeper levels proved to be finely distributed in ore containing other minerals and was difficult to separate either by mechanical or chemical means. This required greater capital to fund various technologies for extraction. Many miners left for other fields, such as Charters Towers, discovered in 1871 and which quickly overtook Ravenswood as a gold producer and as the most important inland North Queensland town.

Despite this, Ravenswood continued to prosper due to a steady, though reduced, production of gold, the discovery of silver at nearby Totley in 1878 and as a commercial centre. By 1874, the town had a courthouse and police station, a post and telegraph office, and a school. The first hospital was established by subscription in 1871. The stability of the town was also assisted by the arrival of the railway in 1884 and the use of improved means to extract gold from ore. A new generation of public buildings began to replace those from the early days of the field, including a new hospital built in 1887.

In 1899, the New Ravenswood Company was formed by Archibald Laurence Wilson who raised overseas capital, reopened old mines and used modern methods to rework tailings more efficiently. The shareholders recouped their investment in the first two years and this drew world-wide interest. It was the beginning of Ravenswood's most prosperous period.

In the 1890s, the perceived need to provide trained assistance and transport to hospital for the sick and injured resulted in the formation in Brisbane of the Queensland Ambulance Transport Brigade. Charters Towers set up the second branch of the QATB in 1900, needing it not only as a major city, but also as a mining town. Mining had always been a dangerous occupation and rapid growth tended to overtake the provision of safety measures, making serious accidents not uncommon. This was also the case in Ravenswood where between 1879 and 1917, 22 miners were killed and 116 injured in the course of their work. The water supply was also unsafe and there were periodic outbreaks of serious illnesses caused by this. The ambulance centre was established in Macrossan Street, a date commemorated on the parapet of the current ambulance building. Ambulances were equipped with harnesses which were used to pull up injured men from mine shafts. In 1904, the current building was constructed to serve 4700 people, the highest population level that Ravenswood would ever have.

After 1908, the town began to decline and the hospital closed. As time went by the cost of extraction grew as returns lessened and Wilson lost money searching for "mother" lodes at deep levels and began to lay off miners. A strike in 1912 dragged out for eight months causing hardship and although judgement eventually favoured the miners, Wilson could no longer afford to employ many of them. The decline of the Ravenswood mines continued with the outbreak of war in 1914 increasing costs and disruptions to the labour supply. Buildings began to be sold for removal and in 1916 rail services were cut. In 1917, the New Ravenswood Company closed.

In the 1920s, most of the timber buildings in Ravenswood were moved away, although brick buildings, such as the ambulance station, could not be moved. Ravenswood Shire was absorbed into Dalrymple Shire in 1929 and in 1930 Ravenswood became the first Queensland town to lose its railway connection and therefore the use of the railway ambulance which had served Ravenswood from Charters Towers since 1919. Mining had a modest revival in the 1930s, but this had little effect on the life of the town. By the 1960s, Ravenswood had reached its lowest ebb with a population of about 70. At this point, tourists began to take a growing interest in the town, studies were made of the buildings and work began to conserve them. In the 1980s the whole town was listed by the Australian Heritage Commission and the National Trust of Queensland. In 1987, Carpentaria Gold Ltd opened a new open cut mine using modern heap leaching processes.

Following the closure of the hospital, the ambulance service had often provided medical advice. The centre was staffed until the 1950s although the buildings was also used intermittently for storage. In the 1960s, the Royal Flying Doctor Service began to hold a monthly surgery in the building. Clinics held by the Flying Doctor have continued to the present day.

The building underwent considerable repair and refurbishment in the 1990s and continues to provide medical services for the community through clinics. It also houses a part-time children's play group and the State Emergency Service has storage facilities built in a shed to the rear in 1997.

== Description ==
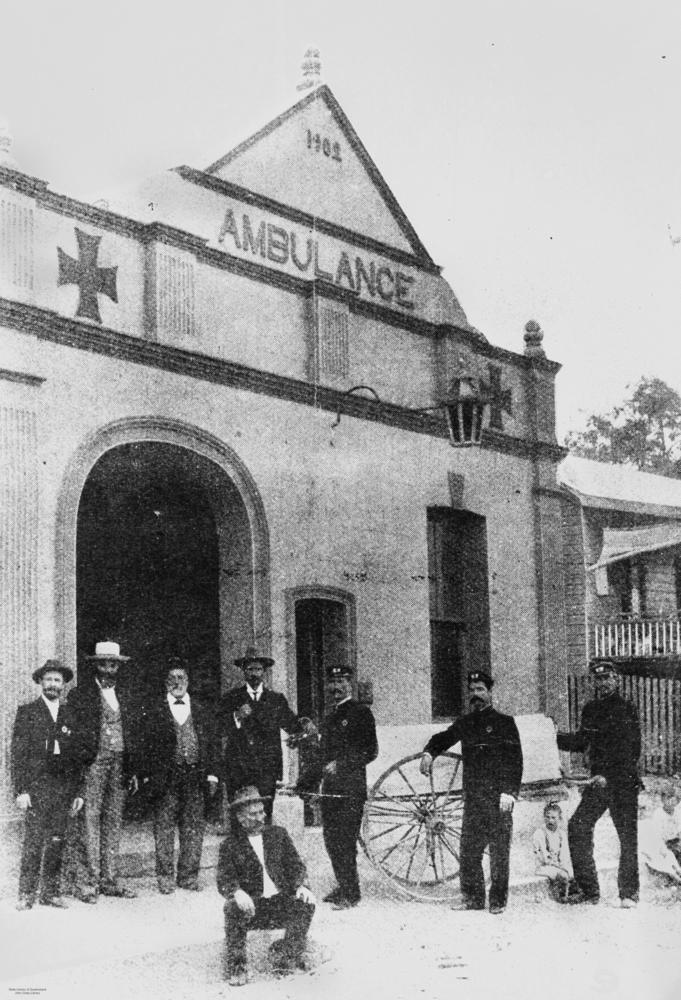
Ambulance station, 1906

The Ravenswood Ambulance station is located in Deighton St close to the bank of Elphinstone Creek. It is a single storey building of rendered brick, rectangular in plan, with its long axis at right angles to the street. The roof is clad in corrugated iron and hipped at the rear. It has a decorative metal ventilator on the ridge. The facade has a gabled parapet and is asymmetrical, with the central doorway flanked by a large arched gateway for the ambulance vehicle to the left and a sash window on the right. It has rendered ornamentation including fluted pilasters, two Maltese crosses and the words "Ambulance" and "1902" in raised letters. There is a lamp over the doorway.

Inside there is provision for the ambulance and a series of rooms on one side of the building with timber framed tongue and groove partitions, concrete and timber floors, and flat galvanised iron ceilings.

== Heritage listing ==
Ravenswood Ambulance Station was listed on the Queensland Heritage Register on 21 October 1992 having satisfied the following criteria.

The place is important in demonstrating the evolution or pattern of Queensland's history.

Mining has been important in the development of North Queensland and the Ambulance Station is one of the few buildings remaining from the boom period of the once important goldfield town of Ravenswood. Many accidents occurred in early mines and the erratic water supply of many mining towns caused frequent outbreaks of serious illness. The Ambulance Station therefore provided an essential service. Its early establishment and subsequent expanded medical use when the population reduced and the hospital closed illustrates a pattern of expansion and decline common to many mining towns.

The place is important in demonstrating the principal characteristics of a particular class of cultural places.

It is important as an example of an early ambulance station providing accommodation for ambulance, staff and office in a small, centrally placed building.

The place is important because of its aesthetic significance.

The Ambulance station is an attractive building and, as one of the few brick buildings from the boom years of Ravenswood, is an important feature of its townscape.

The place has a strong or special association with a particular community or cultural group for social, cultural or spiritual reasons.

The Ambulance station has a long association with the Ravenswood community and the Royal Flying Doctor Service.
