= Black Jack, Queensland =

Black Jack
- Suburb
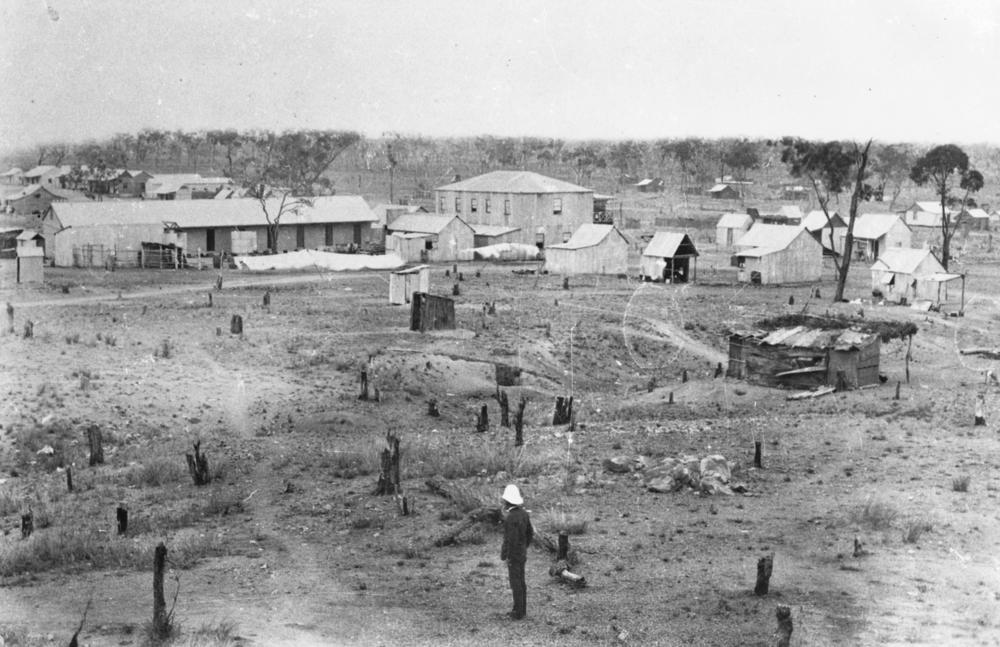
- Black Jack, circa 1889

- Interactive map of Black Jack
- Coordinates: 20.1688°S 146.1522°E
- Country: Australia
- State: Queensland
- LGA: Charters Towers Region
- Location: 11.6 km (7.2 mi) WSW of Charters Towers CBD; 147 km (91 mi) SW of Townsville; 1,311 km (815 mi) NNW of Brisbane
- Established: Before 1887

Government
  - State electorate: Traeger
  - Federal division: Kennedy

Area
  - Total: 126.6 km^{2} (48.9 sq mi)

Population
  - Total: 167 (2021 census)
  - Density: 1.319/km^{2} (3.416/sq mi)
- Time zone: UTC+10:00 (AEST)
- Postcode: 4820
Suburbs around Black Jack
Basalt	Southern Cross	Mosman Park; Towers Hill
Campaspe	Black Jack	Broughton
Campaspe	Seventy Mile	Seventy Mile

Black Jack is a rural locality in the Charters Towers Region, Queensland, Australia. It was formerly a mining town. In the 2021 census, Black Jack had a population of 167 people.

== Geography ==
Black Jack is a triangular-shaped locality. The Great Northern railway line forms the northern boundary of Black Jack. There are two railway stations within the locality, Wellington Yards railway station in the far north-east corner, on the outskirts of the suburbs of Charters Towers, and Southern Cross railway station on its north-west border.

The Flinders Highway passes through the northern part of the locality, while the Diamantina Road forms its eastern boundary.

Black Jack is approximately 350 metres (1,150 ft) above sea level rising to peaks in its south-west of 450 metres (1,480 ft).

== History ==
The Black Jack P. C. mine produced large quantities of gold in 1886 and 1887 (known as the Black Jack Boom) but then produced very little in subsequent years.

Black Jack Provisional School opened on 21 March 1887. It became Black Jack State School on 6 July 1891. It closed in 1949. It was north of the Butler Blocks Mine to the east of Diamantina Road (approx 20.1362°S 146.2182°E), now within the neighbouring locality of Broughton.

== Demographics ==
In the 2016 census, Black Jack had a population of 161 people.

In the 2021 census, Black Jack had a population of 167 people.

== Education ==
There are no schools in Black Jack. The nearest government primary school is Charters Towers Central State School in neighbouring Charters Towers CBD. The nearest government secondary school is Charters Towers State High School, also in the Charters Towers CBD.
