= Mining works on Towers Hill =

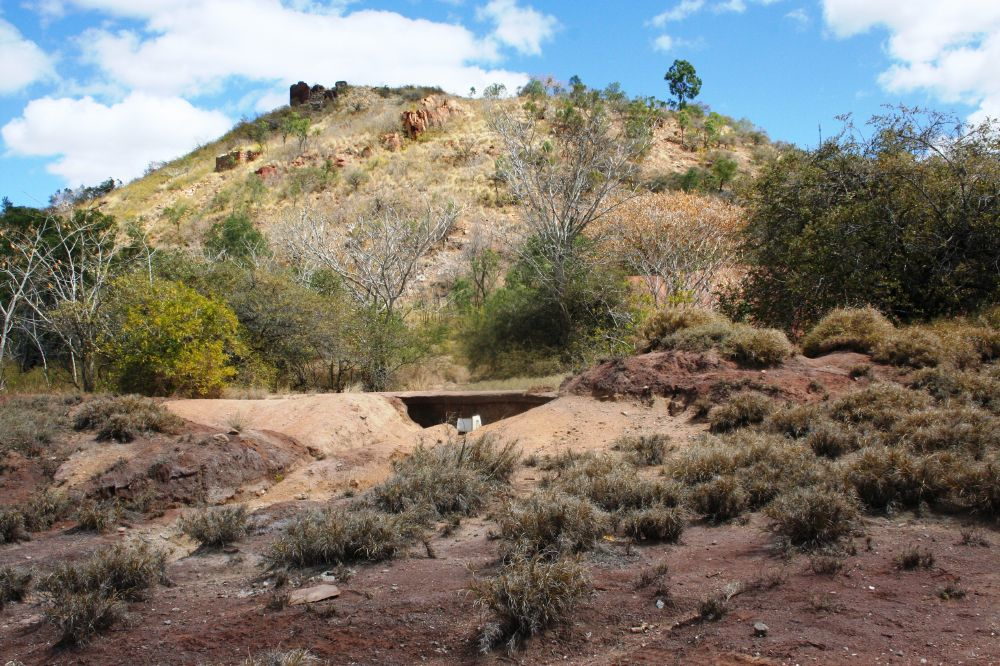
- Towers Hill, site of former mining activity, 2011

- Location within Queensland Location within Australia
- 20.0893°S 146.2517°E
- Location: Towers Hill, Charters Towers, Charters Towers Region, Queensland, Australia

History
- Design period: 1870s–1890s (late 19th century)
- Built: 1872–1940s

Queensland Heritage Register
- Official name: Towers Hill, Pyrites Works, Rainbow Battery, Towers Chlorination Works
- Type: state heritage (built, archaeological)
- Designated: 29 April 2003
- Reference no.: 601851
- Significant period: 1872–1920s, 1940s (fabric, historical)
- Significant components: pole/s – telephone, pole/s – telegraph, tailings dump, tank – reservoir, terracing, settling tank / pond, shaft, embankment – railway, magazine / explosives store, mullock heap, abutments – railway bridge, wall/s – retaining, mounting block/stand, dam/reservoir

Mining works on Towers Hill is a heritage-listed group of mining ruins at Towers Hill, Charters Towers, Charters Towers Region, Queensland, Australia. They were built from 1872 to 1940s. They are individually known as Pyrites Works, Rainbow Battery, and Towers Chlorination Works. They were added to the Queensland Heritage Register on 29 April 2003.

== History ==
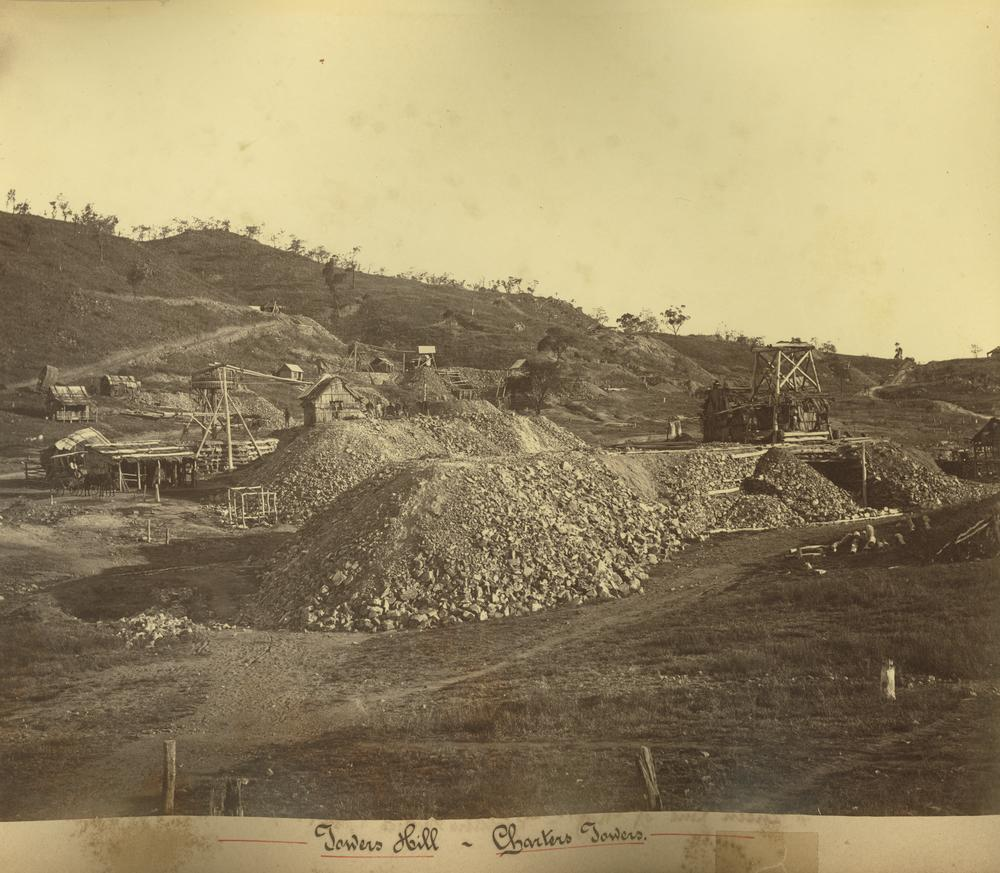
Gold diggings on Towers Hill, circa 1878

Towers Hill was the site of the first discovery of gold in December 1871 which led to the development of the Charters Towers Goldfield. George E. Clarke, Hugh Mosman, John Fraser and an Aboriginal called Jupiter comprised the prospecting party. They camped near the quartz strewn outcrops of the North Australia Reef. Commissioner William Charters awarded prospecting claims to Clarke, Mosman and Fraser on the North Australia line of reef on 25 March 1872.

=== Pyrites works ===
By the mid-1880s milling technology had developed considerably since the early days of the 1870s before mining had reached the ores below the water table. Crushing involved the breaking of the ore by gravitation stamps, with the resulting powder carried by a stream of water over copper plates coated with mercury to catch the gold. The gold was then recovered by scraping the amalgam from the plates and separating the two metals by distillation. When mining reached the water table this method proved inadequate for the recovery of gold in pyrites and base metal sulphides. New plants were set up to concentrate and retreat the tailings from the mills. Six pyrites works are shown on Robert Logan Jack's 1878 plan of the Charters Towers Goldfield. Chlorination, which was introduced in the mid-1880s, involved first roasting the concentrates slowly in a large reverberatory furnace to expel the sulphur from the pyrites and to oxidise their base metals so as to reduce the amount of chlorine they could absorb. Salt was then added to satisfy copper, zinc and other metals whose oxides have a tendency to form chlorides when chlorine is presented to them in a free state. Finally chlorine and water were introduced so that the gold gradually formed a solution of gold chloride which was collected and precipitated.

David Alexander Brown designed and installed the original works and at the height of the Charters Towers Pyrites Works prosperity, he was sent to South Africa and England to study new methods of treatment. He was much impressed by chemical and electrical work done in England and on returning, built his patent "Hillside" furnace, erected works, and in all spent about £60,000 on new plant.

Operation of the works involved ore being fed in at the top of the hill and swept down through a reverberatory furnace to the bottom. It was swept along a hearth 3.2 metres (10 ft) wide for a length of over 100 metres (330 ft) by automatic rabbles and took about three hours to descend. The furnace was surmounted by a monumental chimney stack 54.7 metres (179 ft) high and 5.6 metres (18 ft) in diameter at the base on the outside. The stack was built of 120,000 bricks.

Between the stack and the feed hopper were elaborate dust chambers – four double and five single ones. These chambers had a V-shaped cross-section, about 9 metres (30 ft) across at the top and sloping 45 degrees to a trough at the bottom. They were built and buttressed in brick.

The furnace had a number of arches which were parallel to the length of the furnace rather than a continuous arch from side to side. The total fall of the furnace was 90.2 metres (296 ft), the length of the hearth therefore being considerably more than 100 metres (330 ft). The total height from the furnace door to the top of the chimney stack was 145 metres (476 ft).

The wood consumed by the furnace was said to average 4 cwt. per ton of ore roasted. It was claimed that from 250 to 300 long tons (250 to 300 t) of mixed concentrates and slimes were processed per week.

A smaller Hillside furnace, 47.5 metres (156 ft) long and 3.2 metres (10 ft) wide, was used by Brown as the design basis for the larger one.

The company installed a very complete electrical transmission plant and the ore was hoisted up an inclined tramway to the top of the hill by means of motors; the dust was sucked back from the chambers, a Roots blower was operated, the furnace was rabbled, and the ore conveyed.

Other components of the works included a Carr's disintegrator which crushed glass to add to filter vats of fine damped sand through which chlorine gas was passed, then chlorine water was added from above to dissolve out the gold. Eight precipitating vats, each about 3 metres (9.8 ft) in diameter by 1 metre (3 ft 3 in) deep, were used to precipitate gold from solutions. The precipitate was burnt in a reverberatory furnace, leaving the ash and gold to be smelted, or sometimes the gold was redissolved and precipitated, after which it was smelted. With the advance of cyanide treatment technology, introduced commercially to Charters Towers by the Australian Gold Recovery Company in 1892, the low cost of handling and treating sands and slimes and the utter simplicity of the new process, meant that the chlorination works, once so prosperous, became redundant and were shut down. The Forrest-McArthur cyanidation process of treating mill tailings was perfected by 1895. In 1899 there were 96 cyaniding plants in Charters Towers. That was the year of peak gold production - 319,572 fine ozs.

By 1904 the Pyrites Works had converted to a cyanide treatment plant; four more sand vats of similar dimensions to those used in the chlorination process were added, and the red tailings which had been chlorinated were retreated by cyanide.

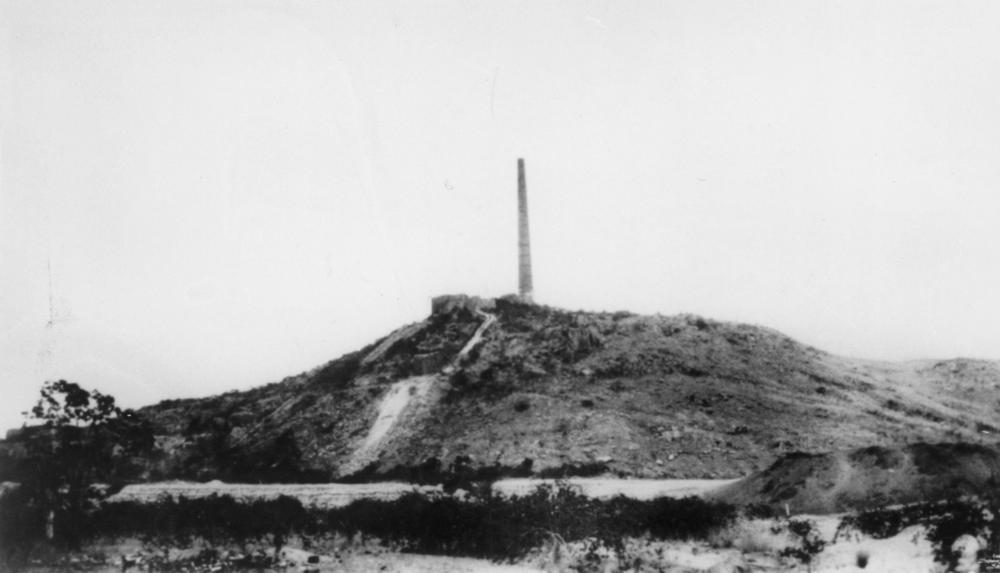
Chimney stack on Towers Hill, Charters Towers, Queensland, 1927

On 10 July 1901, the manager of the Pyrites Works, David Alexander Brown, was advised that his salary would be reduced from £8 to £6 per week. Angry about this decision, Brown went to the meeting of company directors that evening and demanded to be shown the minutes of the meeting at which his salary was reduced. Graham Haygarth, the meeting's chairman, refused and Brown pulled a revolver and shot Haygarth, killing him. Brown then tried to shoot another director, James Matchett, but the revolver misfired. The other directors ran from the room and Brown shot himself in the head in a suicide attempt, though survived. Brown was tried for murder and sentenced to death on 7 November 1901 at a Supreme Court sitting at Charters Towers Courthouse. Brown was hanged at Brisbane's Boggo Road Gaol on 9 December 1901. The landmark chimney became known locally as "Brown's Folly". It was demolished in 1942 when it was considered a hazard to aircraft.

=== Rainbow Battery ===
The Rainbow reef was the site of early mining claims worked during 1872. In mid 1875 the owners of the Rainbow Claim floated a company to finance the sinking of a new vertical shaft. From the Rainbow reef 15,479 long tons (15,727 t) of ore were crushed for 28,130 ounces (797,000 g) of gold. The vertical shaft was 67 metres (220 ft) deep and the underlie over 244 metres (801 ft). The Rainbow mine continued to be worked until about 1896.

It is not known when the battery was constructed as it was not shown on R.L. Jack's 1878 plan or in an 1878 photo of the Rainbow line of reef. However The North Queensland Register reported in 1897 that the Rainbow battery had a 16h.p. engine, 10 head of stamps, 10 berdans, 2 wheelers, a buddle, and concentrators. Ore was run direct to the mill, which was on the Rainbow lease. The Rainbow battery was idle in 1897 and owned by the Queensland National Bank.

It is not known if it worked continuously again, although it is shown on Frederick Deighton's 1903 plan of the Charters Towers Goldfield and on later large-scale Geological Survey of Queensland plans. On the latter, extensive areas of associated tailings are also mapped. In 1911 it was reported that tributors took 36 long tons (37 t) from the Welcome P.C. mine mullock dump and treated it at the Rainbow battery.

A photograph of the Rainbow battery appearing in the Queensland Government Mining Journal of 15 February 1917 (p. 65) shows the works still structurally intact and comprised a corrugated-iron clad battery shed, raff wheel, tanks, tailings dam and other buildings, with Towers Hill and the Pyrites Works chimney in the background.

=== Clarke's Mine and Battery ===
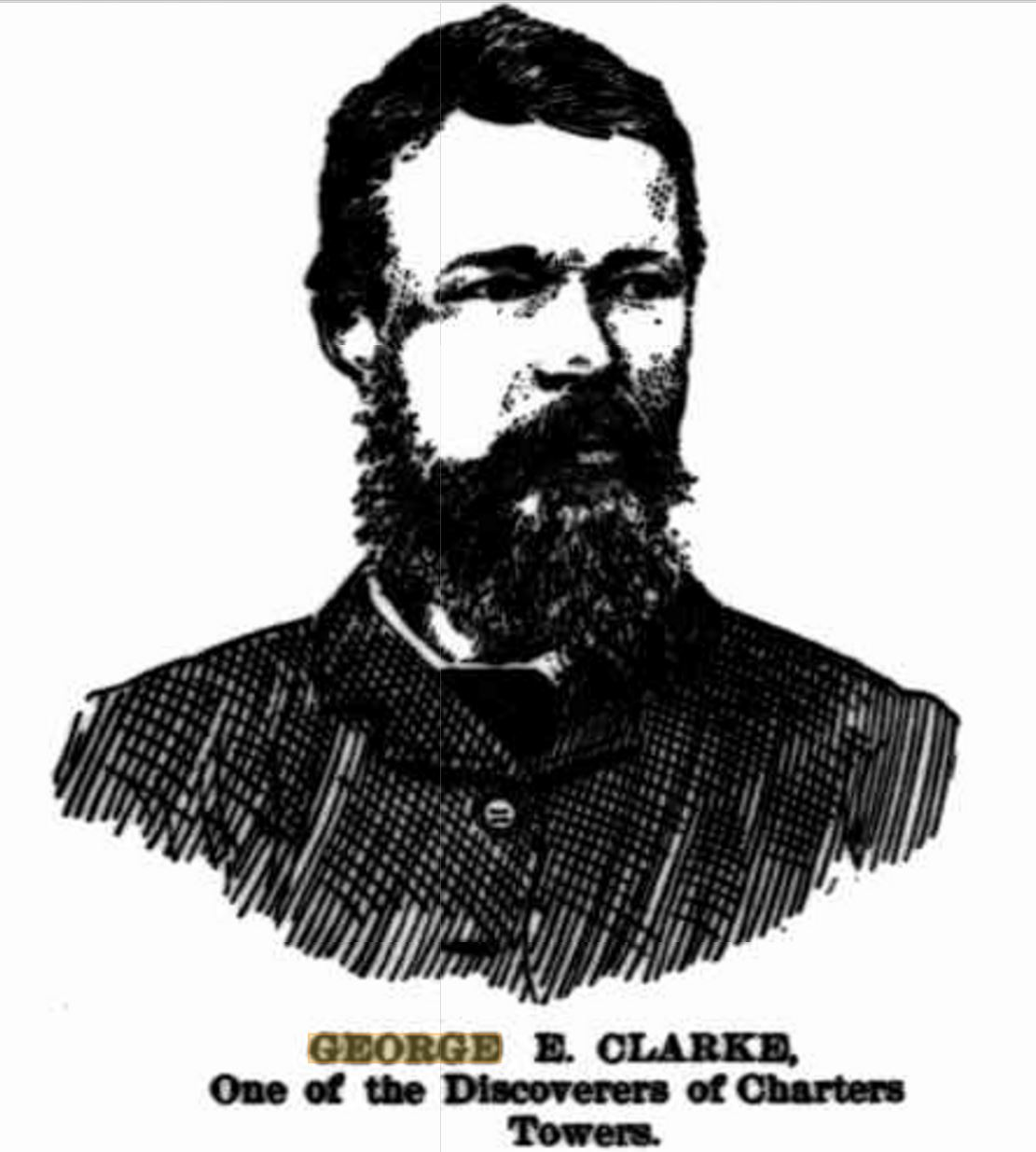
George E. Clarke, 1895

Clarke's mine on the north-western side of Towers Hill is in the vicinity of the first discovery of gold in 1871 by Clarke, Mosman, Fraser and party. Clarke's Gold Mine was worked on the Lady Maria and Moonstone reefs between 1872 and 1885. In 1885 it was one of the claims that amalgamated to form the Mosman Gold Mine which was floated in the United Kingdom in the following year. Under this name it worked until 1898. After this the various claims split again and Clarke's Gold Mine reopened in 1914 and worked fairly successfully until 1924. In this stage the mine produced about 42,000 ounces (1,200,000 g) of gold from the Lady Maria and Clarke's Moonstone reefs. The Clarke's shafts probably produced about 70,000 ounces (2,000,000 g) of gold over their lives, but production figures are confused because of the amalgamations. George Clarke later prospected on the Russell River goldfield before going to Papua New Guinea, where he was killed on the Mambare River in 1895.

== Description ==
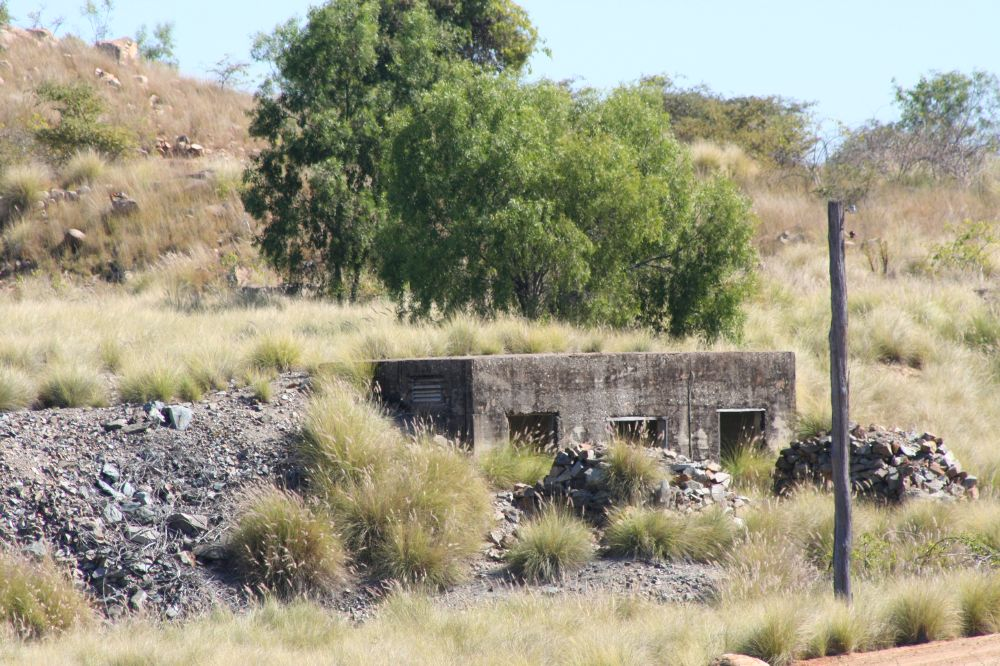
Remnants of buildings on Towers Hill, 2009

Towers Hill is a large granite hill rising 1,343 metres (4,406 ft) above sea level.

=== Pyrites works ===
The site comprises a complex of remnant concrete, brick and stone-pitched mill foundations extending down the eastern slope of Towers Hill. Demolished remains of a large brick chimney are located on top of the hill. The stone footings of two furnaces, including internal brick stairways, extend down from the chimney to the hearth areas near the base of the hill. Stone-terraced foundations of the chlorination works are separately located immediately south of the furnaces. Remnants of the red tailings from the Pyrites Works are located at the north-east base of Towers Hill. White tailings sands and recent retreatment tanks are located at the eastern base of the hill below the chlorination works. The stone base of an original chimney and flue, and the formation of the Pyrites branch railway with stone bridge abutments, are located further south of the works, near an area of early camp sites.

=== Rainbow Battery ===
The site comprises an area of concrete and rendered-stone battery foundations, engine mounts and retaining walls. A tailings pit and two large concrete settling tanks are separately located on the southern side. A stone and earth dam is situated adjacent to the battery foundations on the north-west. A partially removed area of tailings adjacent to the battery on the north-east forms a component of the site. The remains of the Pyrites Works are visible on Towers Hill to the south.

=== Clarke's Mine and Battery ===
The concrete and brick foundations for a winding engine, boiler and headframe survive as evidence of the mine surface plant. A large pile of mullock now fills and covers the shaft entrance. A concrete lined inground water tank has been constructed on top of the spur overlooking the mine. The demolished remains of a timber-framed cement-sheet clad hut of World War II military origin are located beside the mine on the former telegraph maintenance track. Concrete stamp battery foundations and mill surfaces are situated on a lower level immediately to the south. The mine mullock was adapted during World War II for construction of four form-cast concrete explosives stores which are built into the dump. These stores form part of a large complex of similar wartime structures which are constructed over the south-west slopes of Towers Hill. The place is intersected by an early telegraph route with Siemens Bros. & Co., London, iron telegraph pole bases surviving. Timber poles from later telegraph and telephone route construction are also present.

== Heritage listing ==
The mining works on Towers Hill were listed on the Queensland Heritage Register on 29 April 2003 having satisfied the following criteria.

The place is important in demonstrating the evolution or pattern of Queensland's history.

The Pyrites Works site is important in demonstrating the evolution of gold extraction practices in Queensland. Additional historical themes are represented by other components surviving in this landscape including an early reservoir, early telegraph line poles and World War II explosives magazines. Nature conservation values are also present. The visible association of the site with a 1950s telephone line route utilising early telegraph line poles and the secure storage of explosives during World War II provides a unique combination of past technologies and events, and a continuity of history.

The place demonstrates rare, uncommon or endangered aspects of Queensland's cultural heritage.

The Pyrites Chlorination Works is known for its layout and foundation the latest chlorination process technology before the introduction of the cyanide process; then its takeover and adaptation to the cyaniding process.

The place has potential to yield information that will contribute to an understanding of Queensland's history.

These characteristics give the Pyrites Chlorination Works the potential to yield information likely to contribute to further understanding the history of mineral processing technology.

The place is important in demonstrating the principal characteristics of a particular class of cultural places.

Towers Hill contains the most extensive remains of a pyrites chlorination works in Queensland. The Rainbow battery site is a surviving example of the layout of a once representative ore processing mill and demonstrates the pattern of establishing a battery near a line of reef. In addition its location clearly illustrates a physical association with the Pyrites Works and Towers Hill. Clarke's Mine and Battery also represents two distinct phases in the life of the Charters Towers field: the initial prospecting and working of surface outcrops, then the latter reworking of reef offshoots from the surface workings following the exhaustion of the deep leads in the centre of the town.

The place is important because of its aesthetic significance.

The Pyrites Chlorination works, located on the east side of Towers Hill, contribute to the historical landscape and landmark qualities which are further enhanced by the size of the granite Towers Hill rising 1,343 metres (4,406 ft) above sea level and visible from far distances.

The place is important in demonstrating a high degree of creative or technical achievement at a particular period.

The Pyrites Chlorination Works is a rare surviving example of its kind, demonstrating in its layout and foundation the latest chlorination process technology before the introduction of the cyanide process, followed by its takeover and adaptation to the cyaniding process.

The place has a strong or special association with a particular community or cultural group for social, cultural or spiritual reasons.

Towers Hill has a special association with the community of Charters Towers for social reasons associated with its landmark qualities and led to the town and its surrounds being called "The Towers" since the 1870s.

The place has a special association with the life or work of a particular person, group or organisation of importance in Queensland's history.

Clarke's mine and battery foundations are significant because of their association with George E. Clarke, one of the discoverers of the Charters Towers Goldfield.
