= Mosman Park, Queensland =

Mosman Park
- Suburb
- Interactive map of Mosman Park
- Coordinates: 20.0966°S 146.26°E
- Country: Australia
- State: Queensland
- City: Charters Towers
- LGA: Charters Towers Region
- Location: 3.1 km (1.9 mi) S of Charters Towers City; 138 km (86 mi) SW of Townsville; 1,306 km (812 mi) NNW of Brisbane

Government
  - State electorate: Traeger
  - Federal division: Kennedy

Area
  - Total: 2.7 km^{2} (1.0 sq mi)

Population
  - Total: 342 (2021 census)
  - Density: 126.7/km^{2} (328/sq mi)
- Time zone: UTC+10:00 (AEST)
- Postcode: 4820
Suburbs around Mosman Park
Towers Hill	Charters Towers City	Queenton
Black Jack	Mosman Park	Millchester
Black Jack	Broughton	Broughton

Mosman Park is a suburb of Charters Towers in the Charters Towers Region, Queensland, Australia. In the 2021 census, Mosman Park had a population of 342 people.

== History ==
The suburb takes its name from Hugh Mosman, one of the prospectors who found gold at Charters Towers in December 1871.

== Demographics ==
In the 2016 census, Mosman Park had a population of 330 people.

In the 2016 census, Mosman Park had a population of 375 people.

In the 2021 census, Mosman Park had a population of 342 people.

== Education ==
There are no schools in Mosman Park. The nearest government primary schools are Millchester State School in neighbouring Millchester to the east and Charters Towers Central State School in neighbouring Charters Towers City to the north. The nearest government secondary school is Charters Towers State High School in Charters Towers City.
