= Grand Secret, Queensland =

Grand Secret Charters Towers, Queensland
- Coordinates: 20.0747°S 146.2441°E
- Population: 151 (2021 census)
  - Density: 151/km^{2} (391/sq mi)
- Postcode(s): 4820
- Area: 1.0 km^{2} (0.4 sq mi)
- Time zone: AEST (UTC+10:00)
- Location: 2.1 km (1 mi) W of Charters Towers CBD; 138 km (86 mi) SW of Townsville; 1,310 km (814 mi) NNW of Brisbane
- LGA(s): Charters Towers Region
- State electorate(s): Traeger
- Federal division(s): Kennedy
Suburbs around Grand Secret:
Southern Cross	Toll	Richmond Hill
Southern Cross	Grand Secret	Charters Towers City
Southern Cross	Alabama Hill	Alabama Hill

Grand Secret is a suburb in the Charters Towers Region, Queensland, Australia. In the 2021 census, Grand Secret had a population of 151 people.

== Geography ==
Only the south-eastern strip of the suburb is used for residential purposes with the bulk of the suburb being used for grazing on native vegetation.

== History ==
The suburb is presumably named after the two Grand Secret gold mines which were worked from:

- 1882 to 1884 (20.0782°S 146.2444°E)
- 1895 to 1897 (20.0771°S 146.2439°E)

These mines were located in the far south of the suburb.

In 2010, the central suburb of Charters Towers City was created by combining the former suburb of Lissner with land excised from Queenton and Grand Secret.

== Demographics ==
In the 2011 census, Grand Secret had a population of 145 people.

In the 2016 census, Grand Secret had a population of 168 people.

In the 2021 census, Grand Secret had a population of 151 people.

== Education ==
There are no schools in Grand Secret. The nearest government primary school is Charters Towers Central State School in neighbouring Charters Towers City to the east. The nearest government secondary school is Charters Towers State High School, also in Charters Towers City.
