= Alabama Hill, Queensland =

Alabama Hill
- Suburb
- Interactive map of Alabama Hill
- Coordinates: 20.0833°S 146.2477°E
- Country: Australia
- State: Queensland
- City: Charters Towers
- LGA: Charters Towers Region
- Location: 1.7 km (1.1 mi) SW of Charters Towers CBD; 138 km (86 mi) SW of Townsville; 1,308 km (813 mi) NNW of Brisbane

Government
  - State electorate: Traeger
  - Federal division: Kennedy

Area
  - Total: 0.8 km^{2} (0.31 sq mi)

Population
  - Total: 103 (2021 census)
  - Density: 129/km^{2} (333/sq mi)
- Time zone: UTC+10:00 (AEST)
- Postcode: 4820
Suburbs around Alabama Hill
Southern Cross	Grand Secret	Charters Towers City
Southern Cross	Alabama Hill	Charters Towers City
Southern Cross	Towers Hill	Towers Hill

Alabama Hill is a suburb of Charters Towers in the Charters Towers Region, Queensland, Australia. In the 2021 census, Alabama Hill had a population of 103 people.

== Geography ==
Alabama Hill lies to the south-west of the centre of Charters Towers. The land use is a mixture of suburban housing, rural residential housing, and grazing on native vegetation.

== History ==
The gold rush in Charters Towers resulted in the establishment of the Alabama gold mine in 1885 (20.0842°S 146.2480°E).

== Demographics ==
In the 2011 census, Alabama Hill had a population of 103 people.

In the 2016 census, Alabama Hill had a population of 121 people.

In the 2021 census, Alabama Hill had a population of 103 people.

== Heritage listings ==
The north of the locality is within the heritage-listed Charters Towers mine shafts area.

== Education ==
There are no schools in Alabama Hill. The nearest government primary school is Charters Towers Central State School in neighbouring Charters Towers City to the east. The nearest government secondary school is Charters Towers State High School in Charters Towers City.
