= Toll, Queensland =

Toll
- Suburb
- Interactive map of Toll
- Coordinates: 20.0516°S 146.2525°E
- Country: Australia
- State: Queensland
- City: Charters Towers
- LGA: Charters Towers Region
- Location: 3.1 km (1.9 mi) N of Charters Towers CBD; 138 km (86 mi) SW of Townsville; 1,311 km (815 mi) NNW of Brisbane

Government
  - State electorate: Traeger
  - Federal division: Kennedy

Area
  - Total: 7.1 km^{2} (2.7 sq mi)

Population
  - Total: 711 (2021 census)
  - Density: 100.1/km^{2} (259.4/sq mi)
- Time zone: UTC+10:00 (AEST)
- Postcode: 4820
Suburbs around Toll
Southern Cross	Breddan	Breddan
Southern Cross	Toll	Columbia
Grand Secret	Richmond Hill	Richmond Hill

Toll is a residential locality of Charters Towers in the Charters Towers Region, Queensland, Australia. In the 2021 census, Toll had a population of 711 people.

== Demographics ==
In the 2011 census, Toll had a population of 412 people.

In the 2016 census, Toll had a population of 696 people.

In the 2021 census, Toll had a population of 711 people.

== Heritage listings ==
Toll has a number of heritage-listed sites, including:

- Bore Sight Range and Compass Swinging Platform

== Education ==
There are no schools in Toll. The nearest government primary schools are Richmond Hill State School in neighbouring Richmond Hill to the south and Charters Towers Central State School in Charters Towers City to the south. The nearest government secondary school is Charters Towers State High School in Charters Towers City.
