= Queenton =

Queenton may refer to:

- Queenton, Queensland, a suburb of Charters Towers, Australia
- Shire of Queenton, a former local government area in Queensland, Australia
- Electoral district of Queenton, a former electorate in the Queensland Legislative Assembly, Australia
