= Breddan, Queensland =

Breddan
- Suburb
- Interactive map of Breddan
- Coordinates: 19.9719°S 146.2680°E
- Country: Australia
- State: Queensland
- LGA: Charters Towers Region
- Location: 8.0 km (5.0 mi) NE of Charters Towers CBD; 138 km (86 mi) SW of Townsville; 1,317 km (818 mi) NNW of Brisbane

Government
  - State electorate: Traeger
  - Federal division: Kennedy

Area
  - Total: 181.9 km^{2} (70.2 sq mi)

Population
  - Total: 478 (2021 census)
  - Density: 2.628/km^{2} (6.806/sq mi)
- Time zone: UTC+10:00 (AEST)
- Postcode: 4820
Suburbs around Breddan
Basalt	Dotswood	Dotswood
Southern Cross	Breddan	Dotswood
Toll; Columbia	Broughton	Ravenswood

Breddan is a rural locality in the Charters Towers Region, Queensland, Australia. In the 2021 census, Breddan had a population of 478 people.

== Geography ==
The locality is bounded to the north-east by the Burdekin River, to the south-east by Flinders Highway, and in part to the west by the Lynd Highway.

Sellheim is a town in the easternmost part of the locality (20.0052°S 146.4216°E). It was named after pastoralist Philip Frederic Sellheim who was the gold warden in Charters Towers from 1880 to 1888. The southern part of the town extends into the neighbouring locality of Broughton.

The Great Northern Railway enters the locality by crossing the Burdekin River with Sellheim served by the Sellheim railway station (20.00927°S 146.415072°E) within Broughton.

Mount Boddington is in the centre of the locality and is part of the Pinnacles Range (19.9714°S 146.2687°E). It rises to 356 metres (1,168 ft) above sea level.

The land use is predominantly grazing on native vegetation with some irrigated cropping in the north of the locality near the Burkedin River.

== History ==
The Burdekin River Pumping Station was erected as part of the important Charters Towers water supply system, constructed from 1887 to 1891 for the Burdekin Water Scheme Joint Board. When completed the scheme included a pumping station, rising main, reservoir on Tower Hill, chimney stack, engineer's residence, workers' cottages, provisional school, tram track, bridge across the Burdekin River and several trestle bridges to carry the rising main across small creeks between the pumping station and the reservoir in the town. The project cost around £80,000, exclusive of ongoing maintenance, the building of a weir in 1902 and construction of an aerial tramway (flying fox) across the river c. 1911. In August 1975 a new electric pumping station was built at the weir.

Sellheim State School opened 12 November 1889 and closed 5 June 1939. It was on the eastern side of School Street close to the junction with the Flinders Highway (approx 20.0068°S 146.4156°E).

Breddan Aerodrome, located about 13 kilometres (8.1 mi) north of Charters Towers, was initially constructed as a dispersal field for Charters Towers airfield in April 1942 during World War II. In August 1942, Breddan was occupied by two squadrons of the US 38th Bombardment Group. On the departure of the US squadrons, Breddan was chosen for development as a major aircraft repair and salvage depot under RAAF control. The construction program which took place during 1943 involved the erection of maintenance hangars, engineering workshops, torpedo stores, personnel camps, a power station and medical facilities. The base was abandoned after 1947.

== Demographics ==
In the 2011 census, Breddan had a population of 388 people.

In the 2016 census, Breddan had a population of 485 people.

In the 2021 census, Breddan had a population of 478 people.

== Heritage listings ==
Breddan has a number of heritage-listed sites, including:

- Breddan Airfield, Gregory Developmental Road (19.9424°S 146.2543°E)
- Burdekin River Pumping Station, Weir Road (19.98°S 146.3097°E)

== Education ==
There are no schools in Breddan. The nearest government primary school is Richmond Hill State School in Richmond Hill, Charters Towers, to the south. The nearest government secondary school is Charters Towers State High School in the Charters Towers CBD to the south.

== Amenities ==
There is a boat ramp into the Burdekin River at Weir Road (19.9589°S 146.2993°E). It is managed by the Charters Towers Regional Council.
