= Towers Hill, Queensland =

Towers Hill Charters Towers, Queensland
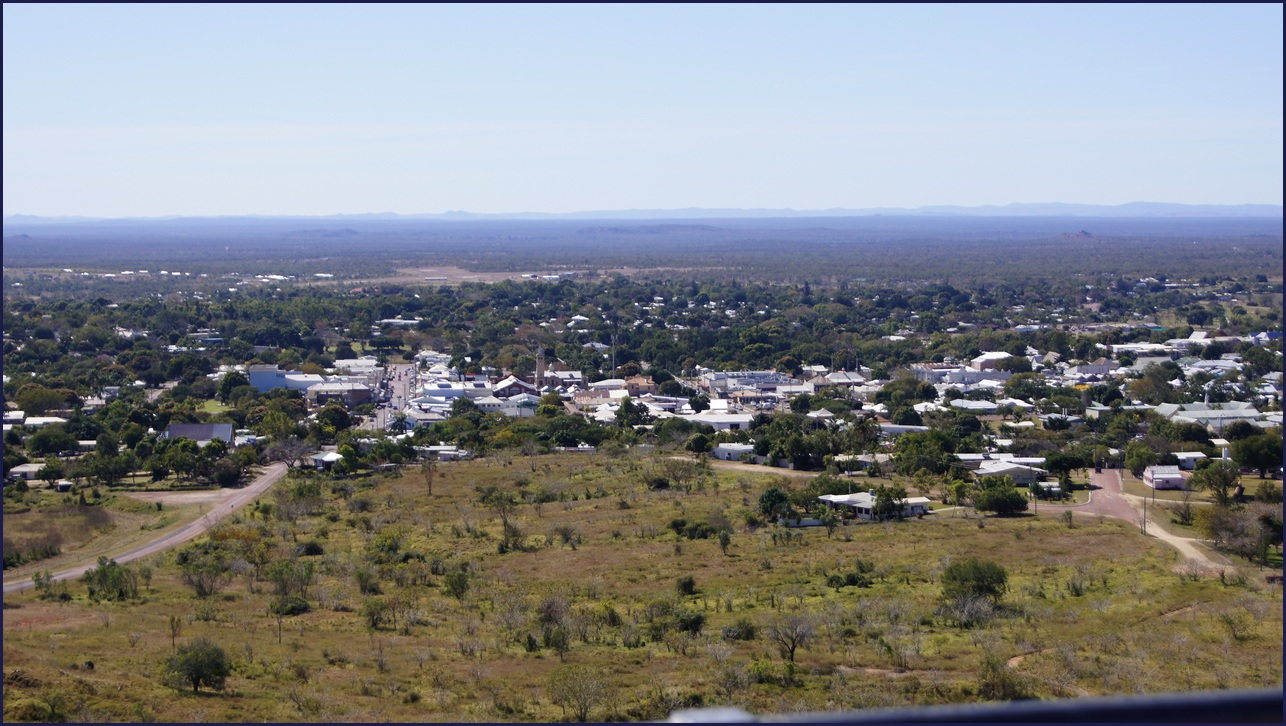
- View from the lookout on Towers Hill towards the Charters Towers CBD, 2011

- Coordinates: 20.0916°S 146.2491°E
- Population: 190 (2021 census)
  - Density: 86/km^{2} (224/sq mi)
- Postcode(s): 4820
- Area: 2.2 km^{2} (0.8 sq mi)
- Time zone: AEST (UTC+10:00)
- Location: 3.6 km (2 mi) SW of Charters Towers CBD; 139 km (86 mi) SW of Townsville; 1,307 km (812 mi) NW of Brisbane
- LGA(s): Charters Towers Region
- State electorate(s): Traeger
- Federal division(s): Kennedy
Suburbs around Towers Hill:
Southern Cross	Alabama Hill	Charters Towers City
Southern Cross	Towers Hill	Queenton, Queensland
Southern Cross	Black Jack	Mosman Park

Towers Hill is a suburb of Charters Towers in the Charters Towers Region, Queensland, Australia. In the 2021 census, Towers Hill had a population of 190 people.

== Geography ==
The suburb is to the immediate south-west of the Charters Towers CBD. Visually it is dominated by the hill Towers Hill (20.0890°S 146.2524°E), the highest point in Charters Towers at 421 metres (1,381 ft) above sea level with the elevation in the rest of the town being approximately 300 metres (980 ft) above sea level.

== History ==
The suburb presumably takes its name from the hill.

== Demographics ==
In the 2011 census, Towers Hill had a population of 224 people.

In the 2016 census, Towers Hill had a population of 218 people.

In the 2021 census, Towers Hill had a population of 190 people.

== Heritage listings ==
Towers Hill has a number of heritage-listed sites, including:

- Mining works on Towers Hill (20.0893°S 146.2517°E)
- Charters Towers mine shafts (20.0932°S 146.2496°E)

== Education ==
There are no schools in Towers Hill. The nearest government primary school is Charters Towers Central State School The nearest government secondary school is Charters Towers State High School. Both schools are in neighbouring Charters Towers City to the north-east.

== Attractions ==
Tower Hill Lookout is located at the top of Tower Hill and is accessed off Black Jack Road. It has excellent views of the surrounding areas. There is an amphitheatre at the top of the hill where screenings are held after dark.
