= Shire of Queenton =

Local government area of Queensland, Australia

Coordinates: 20.088°S 146.269°E

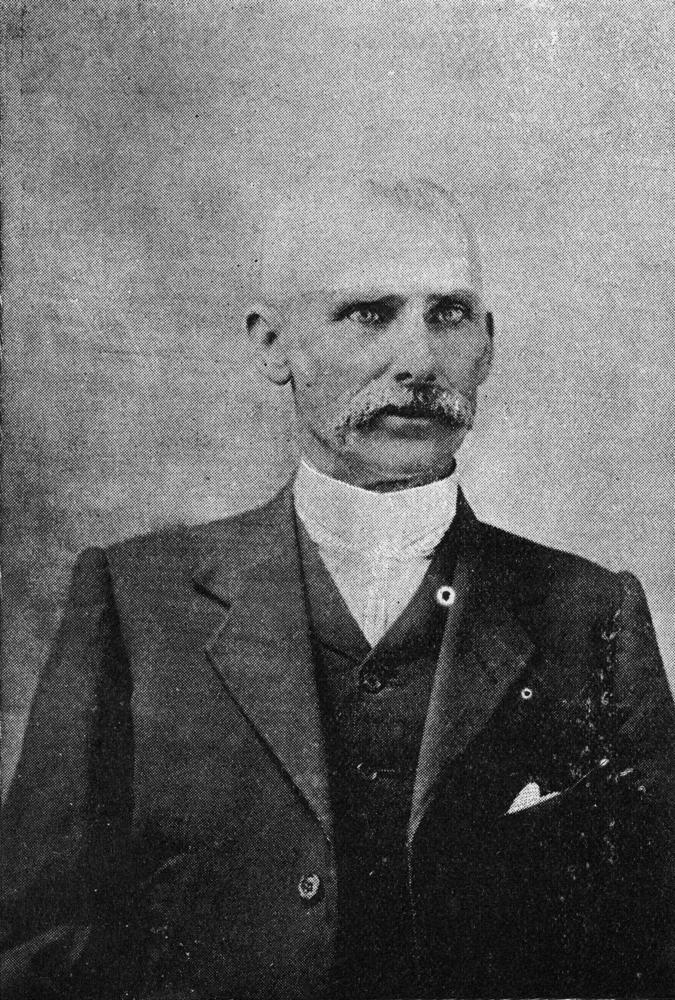
Alexander Hobson Pritchard, Chairman, Queenton Shire Council, 1907

The Shire of Queenton was a local government area located in North Queensland, Australia. It was located to the south of Charters Towers and existed from 1902 to 1916.

== History ==
Dalrymple Division was created on 11 November 1879 as one of 74 divisions around Queensland under the Divisional Boards Act 1879.

From as early as 1889, there were local residents seeking to create a separate local government area in the Queenton area.

On 2 July 1902, the No. 1 subdivision of Dalrymple Division was excised to create a separate Shire of Queenton.

On 23 Dec 1916, the Shire of Queenton was abolished and absorbed into the Town of Charters Towers.

== Chairman ==
Elections for chairman were held annually in February.

- 1902: R.J.Sayers (used title of President of Queenton Shire)
- 1903: John Matthews (Acting), permanent chairman unknown
- 1904: J.Millican
- 1905: John Matthews
- 1906:
- 1907: Alexander Hobson Pritchard
- 1908: William Crocker
- 1909: Richard Carble
- 1910: W.F.R.Boyce
- 1911: J.McLaren
- 1912: T.Chappel
- 1913–1914: J.Millican
- 1915: R.Carbis
- 1916: R.H. Millett

Council abolished early 1917.
