= No. 10 Repair and Salvage Unit RAAF =

The No. 10 Repair & Salvage Unit RAAF was a maintenance unit of the Royal Australian Air Force during World War II.

== World War II ==
The unit was formed at RAAF Base Amberley and was then stationed at Lowood, Charters Towers, Milne Bay, Goodenough Island, Kiriwina, Nadzab, Lae, and Morotai.

== Post-war Activities ==
Following the war, unit veterans in Sydney formed the No. 10 RSU Association to organise participation in Anzac Day parades, reunions and social events. The association distributed a regular Bulletin via postal mail to maintain contact between former unit members. James Haig Henderson was awarded the Order of Australia on Australia Day, 1999, "for service to former members of No 10 Repair and Salvage Unit and their families."

A memorial to the unit is located in Belmont, New South Wales, Australia.
