= Sellheim, Queensland =

Sellheim Queensland
- Coordinates: 20.0052°S 146.4216°E
- Postcode(s): 4820
- Time zone: AEST (UTC+10:00)
- Location: 20.0 km (12 mi) NE of Charters Towers CBD; 119 km (74 mi) SW of Townsville; 1,326 km (824 mi) NNW of Brisbane
- LGA(s): Charters Towers Region
- State electorate(s): Traeger
- Federal division(s): Kennedy

Sellheim is a town in the locality of Breddan in the Charters Towers Region, Queensland, Australia.

== Geography ==
Sellheim is in the most easterly part of Breddan beside the Burdekin River where the Burdekin River Rail Bridge is located (20.0064°S 146.4373°E).

The Flinders Highway and Great Northern railway both pass through the town. Sellheim railway station serves the town (20.0093°S 146.4151°E).

== History ==
The town is named after Philip Frederic Sellheim, who was a gold warden in Charters Towers from 1880 to 1888.

Sellheim State School opened circa 1889 and closed circa 1939. It was on the corner of School Street and the Flinders Highway (approx 20.0068°S 146.4156°E).

On Thursday 26 November 1902, St Mark's Anglican Church was dedicated by Archdeacon David Garland. The church was in Wyndham Street and was 32 by 20 feet (9.8 by 6.1 m). The church cost about £200 and was opened free of debt.

On Sunday 12 August 1906, St Mary's Catholic Church was officially opened by Bishop James Duhig. In 1964, the church was relocated to Pentland, where it is still known as St Mary's.
