= Charters Towers Central State School =

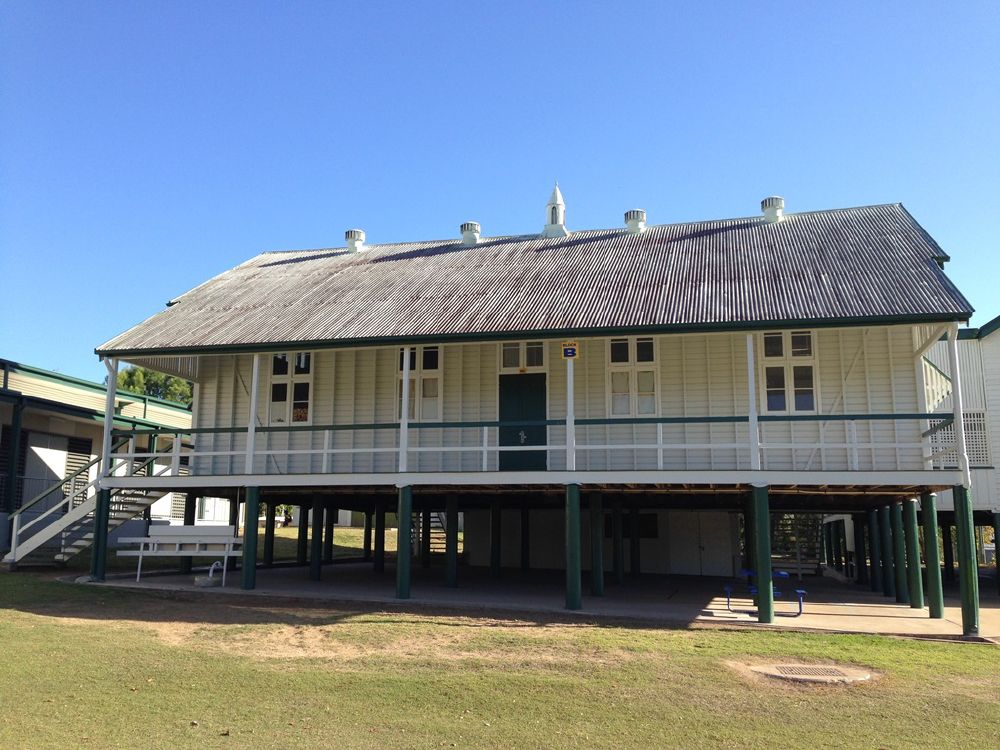
- Charters Towers Central State School, Infants' teaching building, 2014

- Location within Queensland
- 20.0796°S 146.2642°E
- Location: 39–47 High Street, Charters Towers City, Charters Towers, Charters Towers Region, Queensland, Australia

History
- Built: 1900

Site notes
- Architect: Queensland Department of Public Works

Queensland Heritage Register
- Official name: Charters Towers Central State School; Charters Towers Girls' and Infants' Central State School; Charters Towers Boys' Central State School; Charters Towers Girls' Central State School; Charters Towers Girls' School; Charters Towers State High School
- Type: state heritage
- Designated: 28 November 2014
- Reference no.: 602846
- Type: Education, research, scientific facility: School-state
- Theme: Educating Queenslanders: Providing primary schooling
- Builders: Benjamin Toll

Charters Towers Central State School is a heritage-listed state school at 39–47 High Street, Charters Towers City, Charters Towers, Charters Towers Region, Queensland, Australia. It was designed by Queensland Department of Public Works and built in 1900 by Benjamin Toll. It is also known as Charters Towers Girls' and Infants' Central State School, Charters Towers Boys' Central State School, Charters Towers Girls' Central State School, Charters Towers Girls' School, and Charters Towers State High School. It was added to the Queensland Heritage Register on 28 November 2014.

== History ==
The school now known as Charters Towers Central State School opened on its current site, east of High Street and south of Aland Street, on 13 August 1883 as Charters Towers State School for Girls and Infants. As the town and school attendance grew, the school expanded to have new teaching buildings, other structures, and landscape elements. A highset Department of Public Works timber teaching building was added to the east of the original school building in 1900, initially as a separate school for infants. This infants' teaching building, which addresses Aland Street, was later used as a high school, and then as a separate boys school, before the girls', infants' and boys' schools on the site combined as Charters Towers Central State School in 1965. The Charters Towers Central State School has been in continuous operation since its establishment on the current site in 1883 (and from 1875 at a previous site) and has been a focus for the local community as a place for important social and cultural activity.

Traditionally the land of the Gudjal people, European settlement of the Charters Towers area began when gold was discovered at the foot of Towers Hill in December 1871. The find was reported in January 1872, and the Charters Towers Goldfield was officially proclaimed on 31 August 1872. Two settlements were established; one became Charters Towers and the other 4 miles (6.4 km) distant became Millchester. There was rivalry between the two settlements, but Charters Towers soon dominated. Charters Towers was proclaimed a municipality (the Borough of Charters Towers) on 21 June 1877, and a heightened phase of prosperity was entered after the great wealth of the Day Dawn reef was discovered in 1878.

The first local state school opened in 1874 in Millchester, while Charters Towers Primary School opened on 18 October 1875, on a 5-acre (2.0 ha) block, three blocks west of today's Charters Towers Central State School, on the site now occupied by a high school. However, this land was not gazetted until September 1876, after miners were seen pegging ground within the school.

The provision of state-administered education was important to the colonial governments of Australia. National schools were established in 1848 in New South Wales and continued in Queensland following the colony's creation in 1859. After the introduction of the Education Act 1860, Queensland's public schools grew from four in 1860 to 230 by 1875. The State Education Act 1875 provided for free, compulsory and secular primary education and the establishment of the Department of Public Instruction. This further standardised the provision of education, and despite difficulties, achieved the remarkable feat of bringing basic literacy to most Queensland children by 1900.

The establishment of schools was considered an essential step in the development of early communities and integral to their success. Locals often donated land and labour for a school's construction and the school community contributed to maintenance and development. Schools became a community focus, a symbol of progress, and a source of pride, with enduring connections formed with past pupils, parents, and teachers. The inclusion of war memorials and community halls reinforced these connections and provided a venue for a wide range of community events in schools across Queensland.

The Queensland Government developed standard plans for its school buildings to help ensure consistency and economy. From the 1860s until the 1960s, Queensland school buildings were predominantly timber framed, an easy and cost-effective approach that also enabled the government to provide facilities in remote areas. Standard designs were continually refined in response to changing needs and educational philosophy and Queensland school buildings were particularly innovative in climate control, lighting, and ventilation. Standardisation produced distinctly similar schools across Queensland with complexes of typical components.

The Charters Towers Primary School initially consisted of one building, with separate play sheds for girls and boys. As a result of the increasing population of Charters Towers, a separate building for the girls was constructed in 1879 at the primary school.

Once again, the school became overcrowded and the need for a separate school for girls was evident. In November 1880 a School Inspector's report recommended the establishment of a separate Girls' School, given both the growth in numbers and parents' moral concerns. It was also decided to locate the Girls' School on a new site. A site of 1 acre (0.40 ha) 3 roods 17.5 perches (3,480 m^{2}) was surveyed in June 1881, and was gazetted in August that year. The new State School for Girls and Infants was located to the east of High Street, three blocks east of the primary school, and adjacent to the Roman Catholic Church School Reserve.

The site was bound by Aland, High and Mexican Streets, but it initially excluded a small, privately owned block on the northwest corner of the site, fronting Aland and High Streets. The new school site was on the crown of Mexican Ridge and was described as "healthy... central and airy". It overlooked the town to the west, and the railway station and the suburb of Queenton to the east. The government provided plans for a building which would cost of £1500, one fifth (£300) of which would have to be raised locally.

Tenders were advertised for a new school in September 1881 but none of the tenders received were within the anticipated budget. Further calls for tenders were made in November 1881, and April 1882. In 1883, after multiple years of public complaint and outcry about overcrowding at the original school site, the government constructed the new building at the new site using its own labour. The Girls' School, which addressed Aland Street, was officially opened on 13 August 1883. The original school site then became the State School for Boys.

The new teaching building at the State School for Girls and Infants was constructed to a standard design by architect Robert Ferguson. In 1885 Robert Ferguson was replaced as the Department of Public Instruction's Superintendent of Buildings by his brother John Ferguson, who continued to implement his brother's designs until John's death in 1893, when responsibility for school buildings passed back to the Department of Public Works.

Charters Towers continued to prosper and grow in the 1880s. In this decade it became the most productive goldfield in Queensland. The procurement of gold from deep seams required substantial machinery to crush quartz and sink shafts, and by 1882 company mining became the norm in Charters Towers. The arrival of the Great Northern railway line from Townsville to Charters Towers in December 1882 also boosted the town's prosperity, by lowering the cost of supplies and building materials. A display of Charters Towers Gold in the Queensland Court at the Colonial and Indian Exhibition in London in 1886 in turn led to an influx of capital from English speculators. Although there was a brief economic downturn in 1888, due to drought reducing the water supply for crushing machines, in 1889 the famous Brilliant Reef, the richest on the field, was discovered.

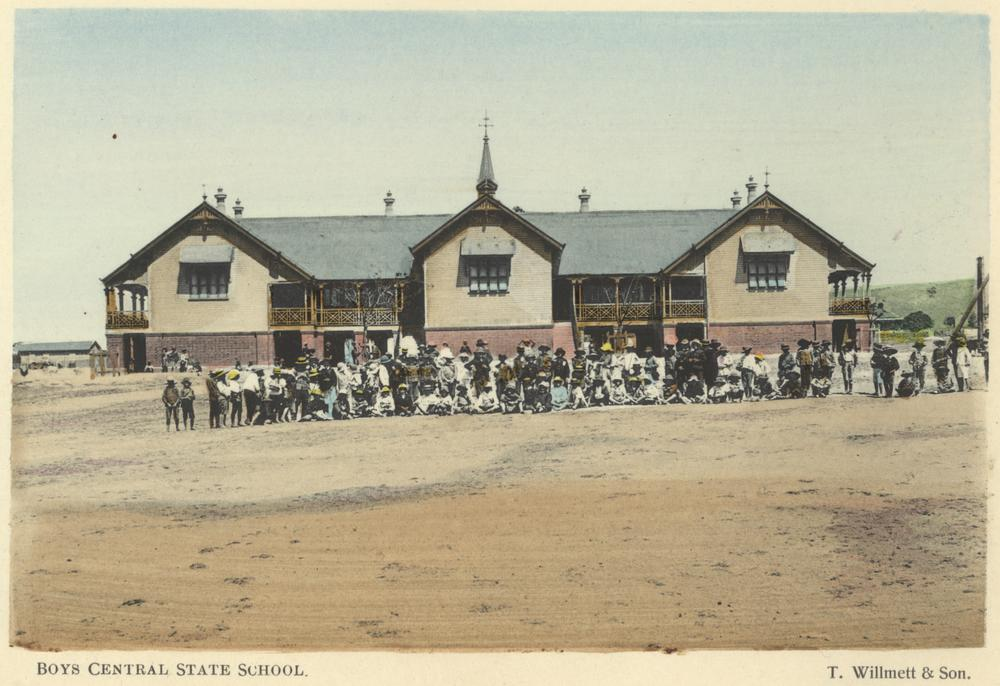
Students and staff gathered outside Boys Central State School, Charters Towers, 1904

By January 1884, there were two state schools, a convent school, and two small private schools in Charters Towers; with a total of 924 children, including 160 at the State School for Boys, and 421 at the State School for Girls and Infants. In October 1885 tenders were called for additions to the "Girls" and Infants' State School', and the Ferguson building was extended to accommodate infants' classes, in an additional timber wing at the south end. By December 1885 the Girls' and Infants' School had an average attendance of 690 students; while the Boys' School at the original site had an average attendance of 250. In mid-1889 the girls' and infants' schools were separated, although they both remained in the Ferguson building.

Charters Towers continued to thrive throughout the depressed economy of the 1890s, with a peak production of 319,572 ounces (9,059,700 g) of gold in 1899. By this time it had a population of around 26,500, and was the second most important city economically in Queensland. At the turn of the century Charters Towers, with its multi-cultural population, was known colloquially as "the World".

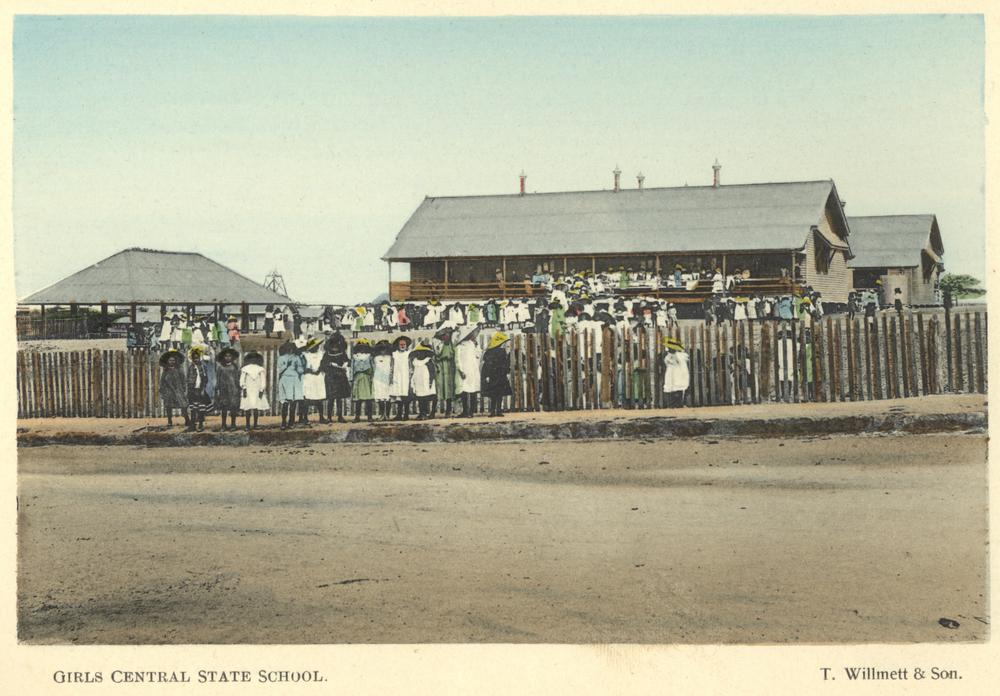
Students gathered outside the Girls Central State School, Charters Towers, 1904

This continued prosperity was reflected in the schools. The State School for Boys had a new building by 1890, while in 1891 the grounds at the girls' and infants' schools were extended. A block of 1 acre (0.40 ha) 3 roods (33,000 sq ft; 3,000 m^{2}) 1.5 perches (38 m^{2}) was purchased in 1891, extending the school site eastwards as far as Boundary Street. By 1892 the Girls' School had an enrolment of 405 (average attendance 309), and the Infants' School had a roll of 700 (average attendance 500).

In 1895 the term "Central" was added to the names of the three state schools for the first time, possibly to avoid confusion between other state schools that were constructed in Charters Towers around a similar time (in the suburbs of Richmond Hill and Queenton). The schools became known as Charters Towers Central (Boys) School, Charters Towers Central (Girls) School and Charters Towers Central (Infants) School.

As numbers at the girls' and infants' schools continued to grow, it was decided that a separate new building would be constructed to house the Infants' School. Tenders were invited on 19 October 1899, and a social and dance was held in the School of Arts in aid of the building fund later that month. The tender of Benjamin Toll, a local builder and contractor, for £1912,13s was accepted in January 1900.

The 1900 Infants' teaching building was constructed to the east of the Ferguson building, to a design by the Department of Public Works. Under the stewardship of the Department of Public Works, which retained responsibility for schools until 2013, and through the involvement of some of Queensland's most innovative architects, school buildings became more advanced and diverse. This was the outcome of years of systematic reform and experimentation.

A period of marked experimentation in school design occurred between 1893 and 1914, with a primary focus on improving the natural light and ventilation of classroom interiors. Various combinations of roof ventilators and ducting; ceiling and wall vents; and larger windows of varying sill heights and dormer windows were trialled. For timber-framed buildings, single-skin construction was favoured for its heat dissipation ability and economy. Often the building was lined on the interior rather than exterior, providing a smooth, cleanable surface that provided better interior light. The resulting externally-exposed stud framing was protected from the weather by wide verandahs, which had the added benefit of shading the building and providing makeshift teaching space. The introduction of highset buildings began in the late 1890s, providing better ventilation and additional teaching and covered play space underneath. This was a noticeable new direction and this form became a characteristic of Queensland schools. A number of ventilating techniques were introduced at this time. One of note was a continuous ventilation flap on the wall at floor level. This hinged board could be opened to increase air flow into the space and, combined with a ceiling vent and large roof fleche, improved internal air quality and lowered internal temperatures effectively.

At Charters Towers Central State School, the new infants' teaching building was built facing Aland Street, featuring a considerable number of the lighting and ventilation techniques that were being experimented with at the time. Similar to standard design type C/T1 but highset, it was an L-shaped building of two wings, each accommodating one large classroom 53 by 26 feet (16.2 m × 7.9 m). These classrooms each had 10-foot-wide (3.0 m) verandahs front and back. Projecting from the front verandah were two rooms: a hat and cloak room and a teachers' room. The Department of Works Annual Report for 1900–01 noted: "The building has been kept high enough off the ground to enable the entire area underneath to be used as a playground for the children". This use of a highset building with a play area underneath was an early example of what became a standard design from 1909. An enclosure was provided underneath the building for toilets, negating the need to build a separate structure. The classrooms were lofty, well lit and ventilated by tall windows sheltered by deep window hoods, fanlights, a ventilation flap on the wall at floor level, vented ceiling roses connected via ducts to vented roof fleches, and louvred vents into the roof space. The teachers' and hat and cloak rooms incorporated packed weatherboards at floor level for ventilation.

After opening, the new building was used by infants (students between 5 and 7 years old) and the spaces previously used by the infants in the Ferguson building were converted for use as the junior girls' classrooms. When the new infants' teaching building was opened, it had 219 infants on the roll. A Grand Children's Concert was held in the Theatre Royal to assist in the repayments for the new building.

By the time of the Infants' Schools' opening, Charters Towers was no longer a boom town. There was a steady decline in gold production after 1899, and although Charters Towers was declared a city (City of Charters Towers) in 1909, most mines had been abandoned by 1916. The last of the big mines, the Brilliant Extended, closed in 1917, but small mining operations continued to be serviced by the Venus battery. Many timber buildings were moved by rail to Townsville during and after World War I, and by 1921 Charters Towers' population had decreased to 5,682. Some villas were reused as boarding schools as Charters Towers adapted to becoming an educational centre for North Queensland.

The Infants' School's enrolments declined significantly in the early 20th century; affected by outbreaks of measles, mumps, whooping cough, dengue fever and severe influenza between 1908 and 1909. In 1907 there were 191 enrolled infants at the school, but by 1911, this number had dropped to 137. By 1912 enrolment in the Infants' School was small enough for it to move back into the Ferguson building, and the girls' and infants' schools were re-united. In 1912 the attendance at the Girls' and Infants' School was 512 - declining to 396 by 1921.

The vacant infants' teaching building was occupied by the new Charters Towers State High School which opened on 22 January 1912 as one of Queensland's first six high schools. In Queensland, governments were slow to establish state secondary education, considering this to be of little relevance to Queensland's primary industry-based economy. It was not until 1912 that the government instituted a high school system, whereby separate high schools were established in major towns or, where the student population was too small, a primary school was expanded to include a "high top". High tops were an economical measure that provided essentially the same education while utilising already established facilities. The first purpose-built high school buildings were constructed in 1917. In Queensland generally, there were few high schools until after World War II, when secondary education was generally accepted as essential and was more widely provided for.

Modifications to the former infants' teaching building c.1917 for high school use included new walls dividing each of the original teaching rooms into two classrooms; the hat and cloak room was used as a classroom, and a Principal's Office was added to the east side of the easternmost verandah.

Despite the drop in enrolments, the school grounds were officially extended by 2 roods (22,000 sq ft; 2,000 m^{2}) in 1923, although this land appears to have been surveyed in 1913. The High School eventually became overcrowded, and in 1929 it swapped sites with the Charters Towers Boys' Central State School. The Boys' School moved into the 1900 former infants' building but remained segregated from the Girls' and Infants' School.

Existing teaching buildings at the schools were regularly altered for improved lighting and ventilation. Changes to the fenestration at the Boys' school were proposed in 1952, and hopper windows and new hoods were added to the gables, below the existing casement windows and hoods.

In 1965 the boys', girls' and infants' schools were amalgamated and renamed Charters Towers Central State School. The 1970s was a period of substantial growth for the school. New buildings from this time included: "C" Block (1971), "D" Block (1975), the library (1977), and a dental clinic (1978). In the late 1970s, two blocks of land south of Mexican Street at the corner of Boundary Street were purchased for a preschool (opened 1980). The property next door to the preschool site was later purchased to allow for the construction of a play area. In 1980, an application was made to have the section of Mexican Street between the school and preschool closed off, although it was not incorporated into the school grounds until 1996. Today the school grounds cover 2.49 hectares (6.2 acres).

In 2014, the school continues to operate from the site. The school retains the 1900 infants' teaching building. The school is important to the town having operated from the site since 1883 and having taught generations of Charters Towers students. Since establishment it has been a key social focus for the Charters Towers community with the grounds and buildings having been the location of many social events over time.

== Description ==
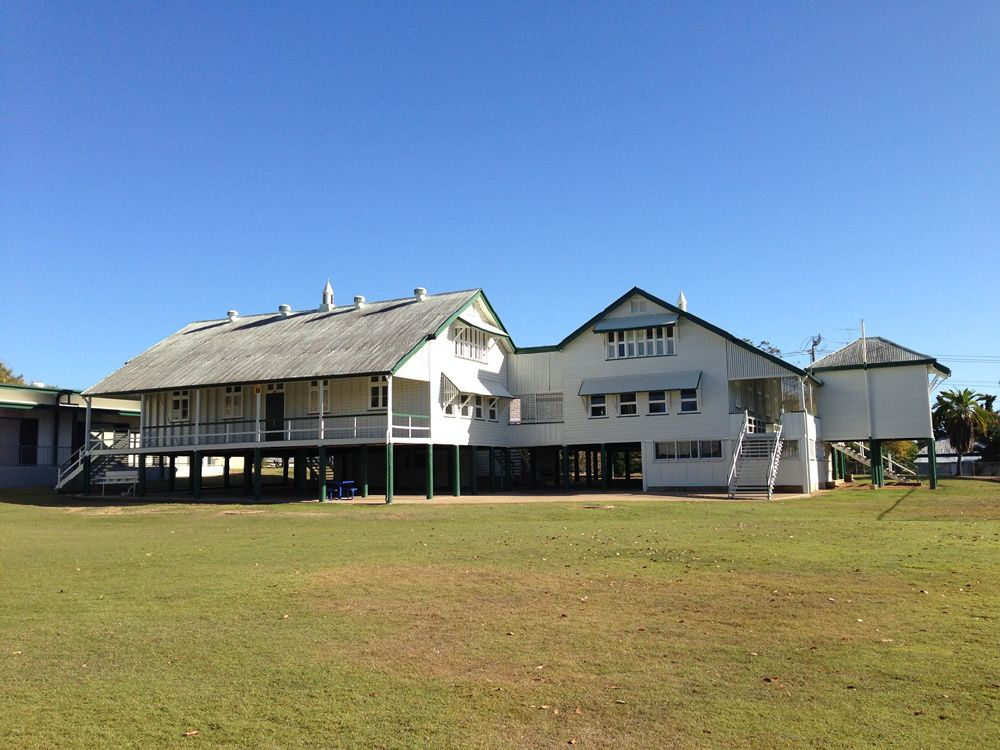
Former infants teaching building, 2014

Charters Towers Central State School is located on a flat site, southeast of the central business district in Charters Towers. It occupies a 2.49-hectare (6.2-acre) irregular-shaped block that is bounded by Mexican, High, Aland and Boundary streets, as well as residential properties to the south. The school comprises a variety of educational buildings, primarily at the northern and western ends of the property, and includes a former infants' teaching building (1900) standing in the northeast corner, which was built to an early Department of Public Works design. In 2014, the main entrance to the school is via High Street; however, established trees mark the former main entrances to the school on Aland Street.

The former infants' teaching building stands behind a small lawn and is approached from the secondary entrance off Aland Street (originally this was the main entrance when the building was separated from the Girls' School adjacent). The building is a weatherboard-clad, timber-framed structure that is highset on concrete stumps. It comprises two gabled-roof wings, one southern and one eastern, that have verandahs front and back. The wings are linked together by the inner verandahs to form an L-shaped plan. Projecting from the verandahs are two small gable-roofed enclosures - a former hat and cloak room, and a teachers' room, enclosed at the understorey level with weatherboards - and a highset principal's room with a hipped roof. The main building's roof is clad with corrugated metal sheets and its ridges have metal ventilation fleches. The former hat and cloak room and teachers' room enclosure features packed weatherboards for ventilation at floor level, and the apexes of gable walls have ventilation panels of louvres that assist with internal ventilation.

The elevations are symmetrically composed. Original windows are timber-framed, centre-pivot windows with high sills. In the gable ends of the wings, later timber-framed awning windows have been added below. Gable end walls have wide and deep window hoods that are timber-framed with battened cheeks and are clad with corrugated metal sheets. The understory of the building is used as a covered play area and is open, with the exception of an original enclosure below the former hat and coat room and teachers' room projection, and an early corrugated metal-clad enclosure under the eastern wing.

Timber stairs provide access up to the verandahs, which are timber-framed with original lattice and batten enclosures at some ends. Balustrades are timber dowels, with some replaced by bagracks. Raked ceilings are lined with beaded boards or later fibrocement sheets; and adjacent to the hat and cloak room and teachers' room, the ceilings are flat. The verandah walls are single-skin with externally exposed timber framing and bracing. Original centre-pivoting windows within these walls are retained. French doors with centre-pivoting fanlights allow access into the classrooms, French doors lead into the hat and cloak room, and low-waisted doors provide entry to the teachers' and principal's rooms .

The east and south wing are both internally divided into two classrooms by single-skin timber partitions, which kink at 45 degree angles to allow access to both rooms from mutual exterior doors. Low-waisted doors in the partitions internally connect the rooms. The classrooms have high, coved ceilings lined with beaded boards, and central timber fretwork ventilation roses. Metal tie rods are exposed within each space and horizontal beaded boards clad the walls. At the base of the verandah walls, the lowest board is hinged to provide ventilation.

The ceiling and interior walls of the former hat and cloak room are lined with beaded boards and walls have hinged ventilation boards. The teachers' room is internally lined with flat sheeting.

Other structures within the heritage boundary are not of cultural heritage significance.

== Heritage listing ==
Charters Towers Central State School was listed on the Queensland Heritage Register on 28 November 2014 having satisfied the following criteria.

The place is important in demonstrating the evolution or pattern of Queensland's history.

The Charters Towers Central State School's former infants' teaching building (1900) is important in demonstrating the evolution of state education, and its associated architecture, in Queensland. It is an excellent, representative example of a building that was an architectural response to prevailing government educational philosophies. The former infants' teaching building is an early and intact example of a highset design by the Queensland Department of Public Works, also incorporating experimental ventilation design.

The place is important for its association with the development of Charters Towers in the late 19th century. During this period Charters Towers played an integral role, through its gold production, in the economic development of Queensland, which is reflected by the size of the school by 1900.

The place is important in demonstrating the principal characteristics of a particular class of cultural places.

The Charters Towers Central State School's former infants' teaching building, constructed during a period of experimental design by the Queensland Department of Public Works, is important in demonstrating the development of standard designs in Queensland state schools.

The former infants' teaching building retains the characteristics of a standard, timber-framed, Department of Public Works teaching building constructed between 1894 and 1914, a period of diverse design united by a distinct emphasis on improved natural light and ventilation. This includes a variety of techniques: highset form; single-skin construction; wide verandahs on two sides of lofty classrooms; a lined interior; fanlights and tall windows with high sills, lattice as sunshade, battening, and broad and wide window hoods; and an assembly of ventilation techniques including packed weatherboards, hinged flaps, ceiling roses connected via ducting to roof fleches, and louvred panels in the roof space.

The place is important in demonstrating a high degree of creative or technical achievement at a particular period.

The former infants' teaching building is important in demonstrating the Department of Public Works' creative approach to natural lighting and ventilation c.1900. A highset school building with a play space underneath as standard, its design combined a number of existing technologies to cope with a hot, dry climate. The building also contains the earliest known evidence of the innovative ventilation technique of wall ventilation flaps at floor level.

The place has a strong or special association with a particular community or cultural group for social, cultural or spiritual reasons.

Queensland schools have always played an important part in Queensland communities. They typically retain a significant and enduring connection with former pupils, parents, and teachers; provide a venue for social interaction and volunteer work; and are a source of pride, symbolising local progress and aspirations. The Charters Towers Central State School former infants' teaching building has a strong and ongoing association with the Charters Towers community. The school has operated from its current site since 1883, (with the infants' teaching building extant from 1900) and has educated generations of Charters Towers' children.
