= Charters Towers Region =

Coordinates: 20°06′S 146°16′E

- Local government area
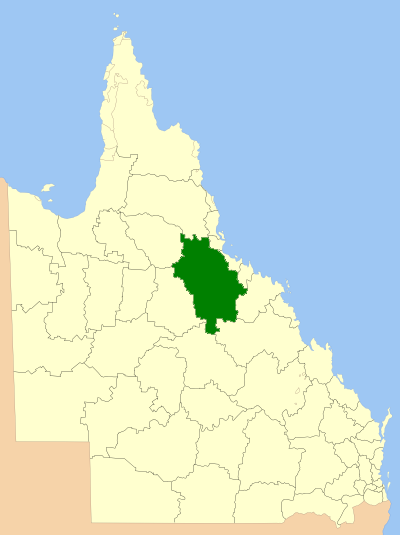
- Location within Queensland

- Interactive map of Charters Towers Region
- Country: Australia
- State: Queensland
- Region: North Queensland
- Established: 2008
- Council seat: Charters Towers

Government
  - Mayor: Liz Schmidt
  - State electorate: Traeger
  - Federal division: Kennedy

Area
  - Total: 68,382 km^{2} (26,402 sq mi)

Population
  - Total: 11,794 (2021 census)
  - Density: 0.172472/km^{2} (0.446701/sq mi)
- Website: Charters Towers Region
LGAs around Charters Towers Region
Etheridge	Tablelands	Hinchinbrook
Flinders	Charters Towers Region	Townsville
Barcaldine	Isaac	Burdekin, Whitsunday

The Charters Towers Region is a local government area in North Queensland, Australia southwest of, and inland from the city of Townsville, based in Charters Towers. Established in 2008, it was preceded by two previous local government areas which dated back to the 1870s.

It has an estimated operating budget of A$27.5 m.

In the 2021 census, the Charters Towers Region had a population of 11,794 people.

== History ==
Gugu Badhun (also known as Koko-Badun and Kokopatun) is an Australian Aboriginal language of North Queensland. The language region includes areas within the local government area of Charters Towers Region, particularly the localities of Greenvale and the Valley of Lagoons, and in the Upper Burdekin River area and in Abergowrie.

Prior to 2008, the Charters Towers Region was an entire area of two previous and distinct local government areas:

- the City of Charters Towers;
- and the Shire of Dalrymple.

The City of Charters Towers had its beginning in the Charters Towers Municipality which was proclaimed on 21 June 1877 under the Municipal Institutions Act 1864. It achieved a measure of autonomy in 1878 with the enactment of the Local Government Act. With the passage of the Local Authorities Act 1902, it became the Town of Charters Towers on 31 March 1903 and was proclaimed the City of Charters Towers on 13 April 1909.

The Shire of Dalymple began as Dalrymple Division, one of Queensland's 74 divisions created under the Divisional Boards Act 1879 on 11 November 1879. It became a Shire on 31 March 1903.

In July 2007, the Local Government Reform Commission released its report and recommended that the two areas amalgamate. Amongst its reasons given for this recommendation were improved service delivery and capacity through a larger asset base and increased operating revenue, and the fact that a significant (and growing) proportion of the Shire's population lived in Charters Towers's outer suburbs and bringing all of Charters Towers under one local government was viewed as desirable. It did not consider amalgamation with the neighbouring Townsville/Thuringowa region due to disparate communities of interest. Both councils opposed the amalgamation, although the City Council concluded it was inevitable due to a shared community of interest. On 15 March 2008, the City and Shire formally ceased to exist, and elections were held on the same day to elect councillors and a mayor to the Regional Council.

== Current Council ==
The council remains undivided and its elected body consists of six councillors and a mayor.

Name	Notes
Liz Schmidt	Mayor
Kate Hastie	Deputy Mayor
Alan Barr	
Kim Farmer	
Graham Lohmann	
Steven Plant	
Julie Mathews	

== Mayors ==
- 2008–2012: Ben Callcott
- 2012–2016: Franklin Beveridge
- 2016–2020: Liz Schmidt
- 2020–2024: Franklin Charles Beveridge
- 2024–present: Liz Schmidt

== Towns and localities ==
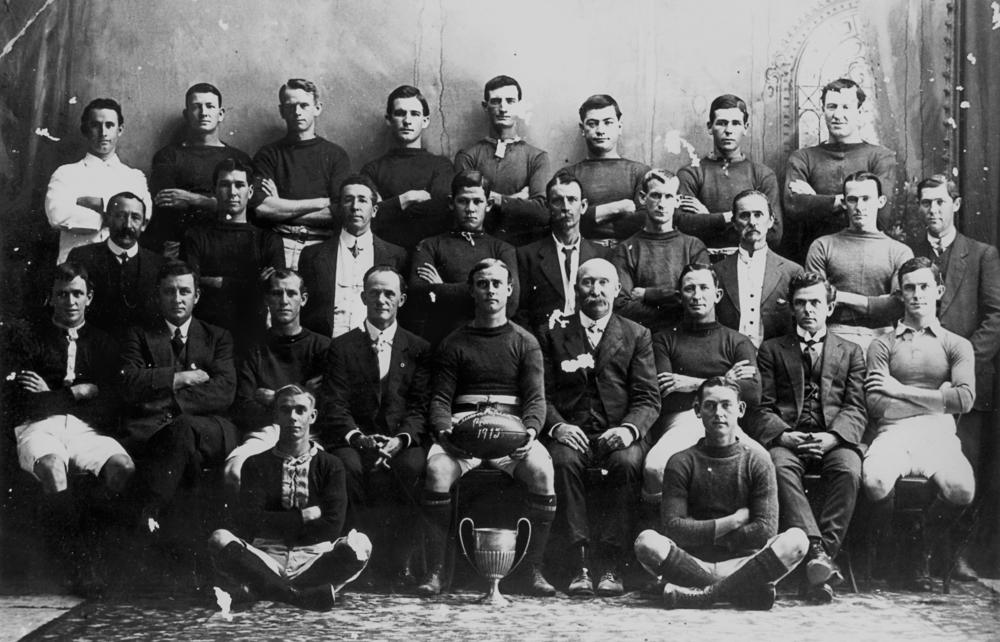
A Rugby league team from Charters towers (1915)

The Charters Towers Region includes the following settlements:

Charters Towers area:

- Alabama Hill
- Charters Towers City
- Columbia
- Grand Secret
- Millchester
- Mosman Park
- Queenton
- Richmond Hill
- Southern Cross
- Toll
- Towers Hill

Dalrymple area:

- Basalt
- Black Jack
- Breddan
- Broughton
- Campaspe
- Crimea
- Dotswood
- Greenvale
- Hervey Range
- Homestead
- Llanarth
- Macrossan
- Mingela
- Paluma
- Pentland
- Ravenswood
- Sellheim
- Seventy Mile
- Valley of Lagoons

== Libraries ==
Charters Towers Regional Council operate the Excelsior public library in Charters Towers.

== Demographics ==
The populations given relate to the component entities prior to 2008. The 2011 census was the first for the new Region.

Year	Population (Region total)	Population (Former City)	Population (Former Shire)
1933	10,238	6,978	3,260
1947	9,872	7,561	2,311
1954	8,875	6,961	1,914
1961	9,839	7,633	2,206
1966	9,605	7,602	2,003
1971	9,796	7,518	2,278
1976	10,494	7,914	2,580
1981	10,161	6,823	3,338
1986	11,460	7,208	4,252
1991	12,500	9,016	3,484
1996	12,562	8,893	3,669
2001	12,345	8,492	3,853
2006	11,937	8,155	3,782
2011	12,169		
2016	11,876		
2021	11,794		

In the 2021 census, the Charters Towers Region had a population of 11,794 people. 41.8% described their ancestry as Australian. This is followed by 36.9% who described their ancestry as English, then Irish (11.0%), Scottish (9.1%) and Australian Aboriginal at 8.2%. 84.4% spoke only English at home followed by the next most common languages: 0.2% Malayalam, 0.2% Vietnamese, 0.2% Tagalog, 0.2% Mandarin and 0.1% Filipino. Indigenous Australians were listed as making up 9.7% of the Charters Towers region population.
