= Richmond Hill, Queensland =

Richmond Hill
- Suburb
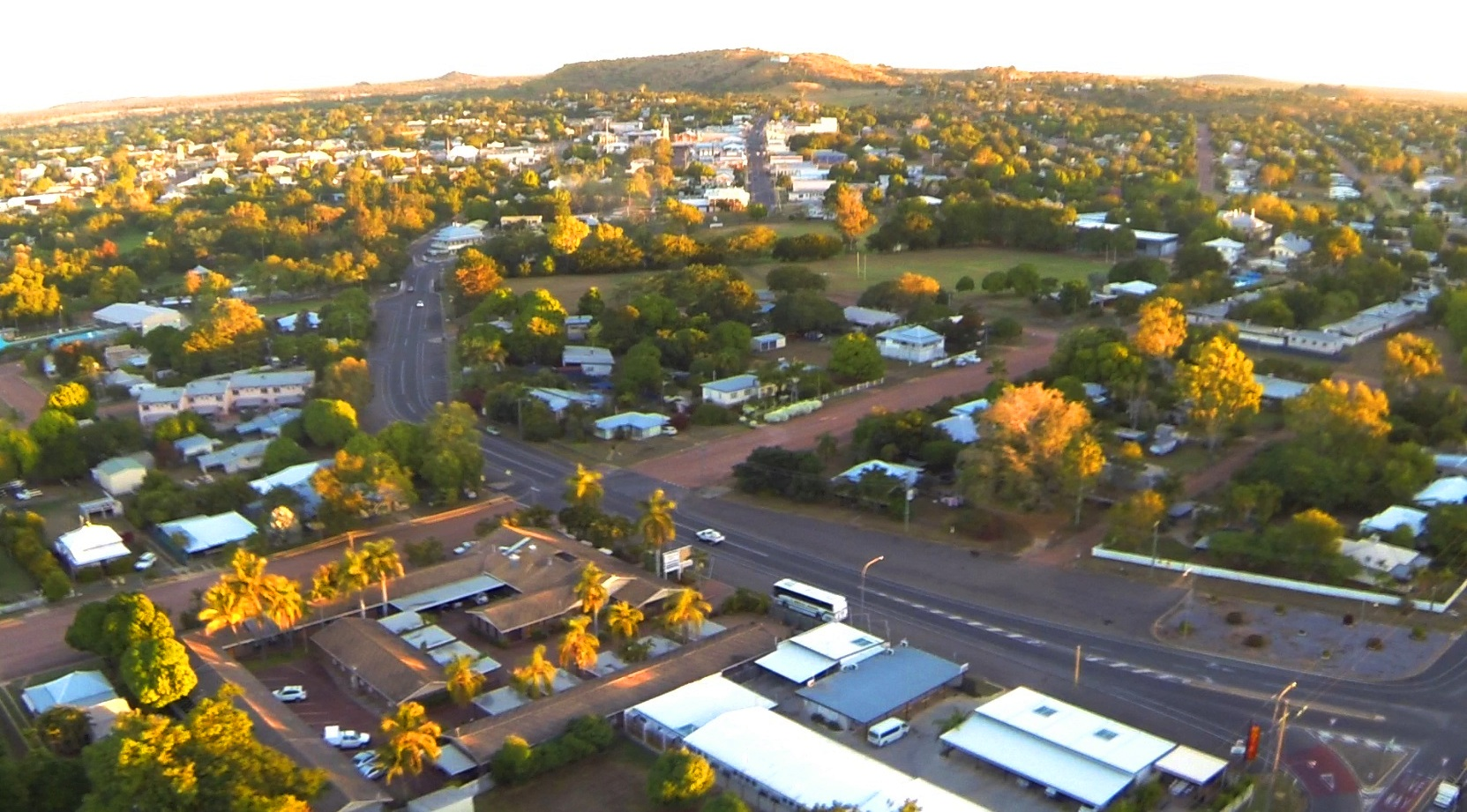
- Aerial view of Richmond Hill, looking from the intersection of Bridge Street with Hackett Terrace (lower right) and then SSW along the curve of Bridge Street with Mosman Street in the centre of Charters Towers and Towers Hill in the distance

- Interactive map of Richmond Hill
- Coordinates: 20.0641°S 146.2663°E
- Country: Australia
- State: Queensland
- City: Charters Towers
- LGA: Charters Towers Region
- Location: 1.9 km (1.2 mi) N of Charters Towers CBD; 136 km (85 mi) SW of Townsville; 1,310 km (810 mi) NNW of Brisbane

Government
  - State electorate: Traeger
  - Federal division: Kennedy

Area
  - Total: 4.3 km^{2} (1.7 sq mi)

Population
  - Total: 2,453 (2021 census)
  - Density: 570/km^{2} (1,477/sq mi)
- Time zone: UTC+10:00 (AEST)
- Postcode: 4820
Suburbs around Richmond Hill
Toll	Columbia	Columbia
Toll	Richmond Hill	Queenton
Grand Secret	Charters Towers City	Queenton

Richmond Hill is a suburb of Charters Towers in the Charters Towers Region, Queensland, Australia. In the 2021 census, Richmond Hill had a population of 2,453 people.

== History ==
Unlike many townships in the Charters Towers area that developed around a goldfield, Richmond Hill was intended to be a residential area and was situated away from the mining areas. A number of schools opened in the area.

St Columba's Primary School for girls was opened in 1876 by the Sisters of Mercy (a Catholic order). In 1882 the Sisters established St Mary's College. Later these schools were operated by the Sisters of the Good Samaritan (another Catholic order). On 14 April 1902 the Christian Brothers (also a Catholic order) opened Mount Carmel College for boys. In 1998 the three schools combined into Columba Catholic College operating from the three campuses (including the Mount Carmel campus in Richmond Hill); the church is now operated by the Roman Catholic Diocese of Townsville through Catholic Education.

Richmond Hill State School, opened 9 September 1895.

The Presbyterian and Methodist Churches opened Thornburgh College as a boys boarding school on 1 June 1919. In 1978 Thornburgh College merged with Blackheath College (a Presbyterian and Methodist girls school in Charters Towers) to create an independent co-educational Christian college, Blackheath and Thornburgh College, on the site of Thornburgh College in Richmond Hill.

In 1920 All Souls’ School for boys was established by the Bush Brotherhood of St Barnabas (part of the Anglican Church) as a memorial school to the fallen of World War I. In 1921 St Gabriel’s School for girls was established by the Sisters of the Sacred Advent (also an Anglican order). After many years of co-educational activities, in 1990 the two schools merged as All Souls St Gabriels School on the All Souls campus. In 2000, the school ceased to be operated by the church and is now an independent Anglican school.

== Demographics ==
In the 2011 census, Richmond Hill had a population of 2,776 people.

In the 2016 census, Richmond Hill had a population of 2,488 people.

In the 2021 census, Richmond Hill had a population of 2,453 people.

== Heritage listings ==
Richmond Hill has a number of heritage-listed sites, including:

- Stone kerbing, channels and footbridges of Charters Towers
- Thornburgh House, 57–59 King Street

== Education ==
Richmond Hill State School is a government primary (Prep–6) school for boys and girls on the corner of Baker and Burdekin Streets (20.0615°S 146.2650°E). In 2018, the school had an enrolment of 362 students with 28 teachers (26 full-time equivalent) and 19 non-teaching staff (13 full-time equivalent).

All Souls St Gabriels School is a private primary and secondary (Prep–12) school for boys and girls at 30 Dr George Ellis Drive (20.0627°S 146.2767°E). In 2018, the school had an enrolment of 405 students with 45 teachers (43 full-time equivalent) and 29 non-teaching staff (24 full-time equivalent).

Mount Carmel campus of Columba Catholic College is a Catholic secondary (7–12) school for boys and girls at 6–8 Hackett Terrace (20.0614°S 146.2728°E) The college's primary school (St Mary's campus) is at 59-69 Mary Street in Charters Towers City. In 2018, the college (primary and secondary combined) had an enrolment of 491 students with 41 teachers (38 full-time equivalent) and 37 non-teaching staff (28 full-time equivalent).

Blackheath and Thornburgh College is a private primary and secondary (Prep–12) school for boys and girls at 55 King Street (20.0705°S 146.2568°E). In 2018, the school had an enrolment of 250 students with 32 teachers (30 full-time equivalent) and 37 non-teaching staff (30 full-time equivalent).

There are no government secondary schools in Richmond Hill. The nearest government secondary school is Charters Towers State High School in neighbouring Charters Towers CBD to the south.
