= Charters Towers State High School =

Secondary school in Queensland, Australia

Location
- 97-113 Towers Street, Charters Towers City; Charters Towers, Queensland, 4820; Australia; 20°04′51.52″S 146°15′40.91″E

Information
- Other name: CTSHS
- Type: Public high school
- Motto: Latin: Cupiendiora Quam Aurum (More To Be Desired Than Gold)
- Established: 1912
- Principal: Anna Osborn
- Teaching staff: 39
- Years: 7–12
- Enrolment: 372 (2023)
- Colours: Maroon and white
- Website: charterstowersshs.eq.edu.au

Charters Towers State High School (CTSHS) is a public co-educational secondary school, located in the Charters Towers suburb of Charters Towers City, Queensland, Australia. It is administered by the Queensland Department of Education, with an enrolment of 372 students and a teaching staff of 39, as of 2023. The school serves students from Year 7 to Year 12, and is one of the oldest state secondary schools in Queensland still operating.

== History ==
The school opened on either 22 January 1912 or 5 February 1912.

In 1976, three teachers were suspended from their teaching roles at the school after being convicted of possessing Marihuana.

== Demographics ==
In 1919, the school had an enrolment of 164 students, with an average daily attendance of 117.

In 2023, the school had a student enrollment of 372 with 39 teachers (38.8 full-time equivalent) and 29 non-teaching staff (22.7 full-time equivalent). Female enrollments consisted of 186 students and Male enrollments consisted of 186 students; Indigenous enrollments accounted for a total of 28% and 4% of students had a language background other than English.

== See also ==
- Education in Australia
- List of schools in North Queensland
