= Charters Towers Police Station =

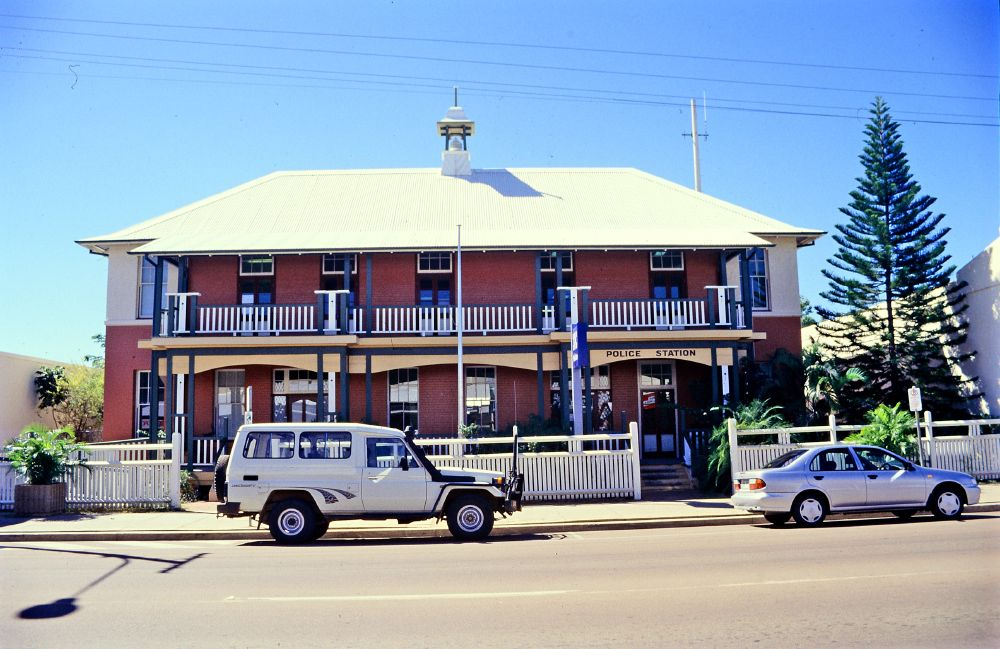
- Charters Towers Police Station, 1997

- Location within Queensland Location within Australia
- 20.076°S 146.2594°E
- Location: 49 Gill Street, Charters Towers City, Charters Towers, Charters Towers Region, Queensland, Australia

History
- Design period: 1900–1914 (early 20th century)
- Built: 1910

Site notes
- Architect: Thomas Pye
- Architectural styles: Federation Filigree, Federation Bungalow

Queensland Heritage Register
- Official name: Charters Towers Police Station, Police Barracks
- Type: state heritage (built)
- Designated: 21 October 1992
- Reference no.: 600401
- Significant period: 1910s (historical); 1910s (fabric)
- Significant components: roof/ridge ventilator/s / fleche/s, police station
- Builders: T Johnson

Charters Towers Police Station is a heritage-listed police station at 49 Gill Street, Charters Towers City, Charters Towers, Charters Towers Region, Queensland, Australia. It was designed by Thomas Pye and built in 1910 by T Johnson. It is also known as Police Barracks. It was added to the Queensland Heritage Register on 21 October 1992.

== History ==
Charters Towers Police Station was the product of the Queensland Government Architect's Office of Alfred Barton Brady. The drawings are signed by the Deputy Government Architect Thomas Pye, and the design is possibly his work. The building was constructed in 1910 by builder T Johnson.

The discovery of gold at Charters Towers in December 1871 and the expansion of the pastoral industry in the region created a need for a resident police force. By 1872 Charters Towers had become the second most important police station in Queensland, after Brisbane, with a staff of 24 police. In 1878, there was a population of 3,760 people on the Charters Towers gold field and there were 256 issues dealt with by staff. These figures are more meaningful when contrasted with the Gympie gold field which had a population of 4,760 but only 79 cases were dealt with.

Nothing is known about the early accommodation for police staff on the gold field; however, a wooden police barracks appears to have been built on the Gill Street site prior to 1891. This barracks was extended in 1891 and again in 1894. By 1907 plans were being drawn up to replace the timber building with new brick premises at an estimated cost of £3000. The existing wooden structure was to be moved to the rear of the block and would be sold for removal after the new building was opened.

£3500 was set aside in the 1908 Queensland Government budget towards the cost of the new barracks and in February, 1909 sketch plans were drawn up. Tenders were called twice, once on 15 April 1909 and again on 3 June 1909. A memo from the Secretary of Public Works, which the Government Architect AP Brady signed on 7 February 1910, recommended that the tender for £3335, from Charters Towers contractor T Johnson, be accepted. The work was to take eight months and included the construction of fences and gates.

In June 1910 the bricks being used in the construction of the building were found to be faulty, and the contractor was told to use them only in interior walls and to supply better quality bricks for the exterior of the building.

The building, when completed, was a two-storey structure of red bricks relieved with rough cast. On the ground floor there was provision for an inspector's, sergeant's and clerk's offices. There was a large day room for constables, a kitchen and a semi detached verandah dining area and on the first floor there were large dormitories and three bathrooms.

There is little evidence of alterations to the building for some time, other than the installation of the septic in 1960 at a cost of £3088, and the conversion in 1975 of the station to a district headquarters which involved some internal modifications.

On "Black Friday" 13 May 1988 the police station was substantially damaged by fire. The roof collapsed, and the interiors were largely gutted. The external brick shell and the internal brick dividing wall survived, along with the timber front verandah, parts of the rear verandah and most of the timber floor. The roof of the brick kitchen block to the rear also collapsed, and its brick shell survived, but this building was subsequently demolished.

Initially it appeared that the building would be demolished and the site sold for development. However, strong community feeling favoured rebuilding. Letters to the editor pointed out the streetscape significance of the former building, the importance of retaining all the remaining buildings in Gill Street, and the important role of the police, working from this site since the late 1880s, in the economic and social development of the city. After strong lobbying from the Queensland National Trust and the signing of a petition by 2000 of the town's 8000 residents the Queensland Government provided funds for the repair of the building.

The interior of the building was consequently rebuilt, having only some reflection of its former layout. An additional wing including the new watch-house was also added to the rear. On completion of this work, the building was again in use as the police station by late 1990, and was officially reopened on 19 March 1991.

== Description ==
The Charters Towers Police Station is a two-storeyed brick building fronted with a timber verandah. The building's principal facade faces south addressing Gill Street, the main street of Charters Towers. Charters Towers, and Gill Street in particular retains many of its early commercial and public buildings, and the Police Station is located near the centre of this historical business district. Extending from the rear of the main building is the single-storey wing of the watch-house.

Sitting between single-storey shops built to the street alignment, the Police Station punctuates the streetscape with a two-storey facade and a small garden filling the setback from the alignment. The front of the site is marked by a white timber picket fence. This fence has openings at both entrances to the verandah, and an earlier gate at the western end.

Rectangular in plan, the main block is built of brick with a corrugated steel hipped roof. The roof has a timber fleche centred on its ridge, and extends to cover the front verandah. The symmetrical composition of the Gill Street facade features the two-storeyed timber verandah.

The external walls of the front and side elevations are mostly face brickwork, which is now painted. Outside the verandah, the walls above the upper sill are rendered in roughcast. The front verandah finishes short of each end, leaving a small bay for a double-hung window on each level.

The verandah has projecting bays at each end over the entries, with double posts at the corners. There is a slatted balustrade to both levels with fretted feature panels. The lower level has an arched timber valance. Several steps lead up to lower timber verandah, and a timber disabled ramp provides access at the western end.

French doors with fanlights provide access to the front verandah at both levels. The end elevations feature double-hung windows with slatted window hoods. The rear verandah area has been enclosed in timber framing, and clad in weatherboards, then connected to the concrete block watch-house wing.

The interior of the front block has been fitted out as offices and work areas. It is lined with plasterboard ceilings and partition walls.

The property extends through to Ryan Street at the rear. Behind the watch-house are driveways and parking areas.

== Heritage listing ==
Charters Towers Police Station was listed on the Queensland Heritage Register on 21 October 1992 having satisfied the following criteria.

The place is important in demonstrating the evolution or pattern of Queensland's history.

The Charters Towers Police Station is important in demonstrating the role of the police force in the development of Queensland regional towns, particularly gold mining towns such as Charters Towers during the late nineteenth and early twentieth century. Their use of this central city site for over a century has established a prominent role for the police service in the city's business district.

The place is important in demonstrating the principal characteristics of a particular class of cultural places.

The Charters Towers Police Station is an example of quality public building work of the Government Architect's Office. It is a surviving example of a type of early 20th century police barracks, which once included several examples in North Queensland such as Townsville and Cairns, now both demolished.

The place is important because of its aesthetic significance.

Located in Gill Street, the main street of Charters Towers, the Police Station makes a substantial contribution to the historical commercial streetscape of the city. Its two-storey height and setback make it a feature amongst its surroundings. Apart from Fossey's Store, it is one of the few unrendered masonry historical buildings of this central commercial district.

The place has a strong or special association with a particular community or cultural group for social, cultural or spiritual reasons.

Following substantial damage to the building by fire in 1988, the importance of the building to the city was demonstrated by the strong community response through petitions and letters, arguing against the demolition of the building, and supporting the retention of what had survived and the rebuilding of what had been lost.
