= Lyall's Jewellery Shop =

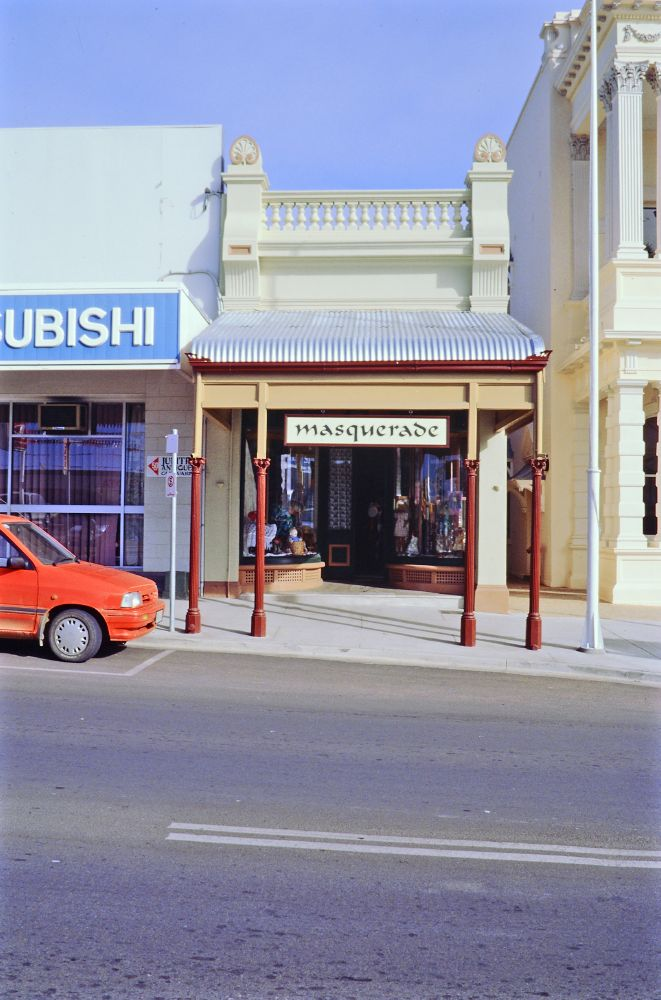
- Lyall's Jewellery Shop, 1997

- Location within Queensland Location within Australia
- 20.0764°S 146.2565°E
- Location: 90 Mosman Street, Charters Towers City, Charters Towers, Charters Towers Region, Queensland, Australia

History
- Design period: 1870s–1890s (late 19th century)
- Built: 1897

Queensland Heritage Register
- Official name: Lyall's Jewellery Shop, Charters Towers and Dalrymple Historical Society Folk Museum
- Type: state heritage (built)
- Designated: 21 October 1992
- Reference no.: 600408
- Significant period: 1890s (fabric); 1897–c. 1970 (historical use)
- Significant components: strong room, furniture/fittings

Lyall's Jewellery Shop is a heritage-listed shop at 90 Mosman Street, Charters Towers City, Charters Towers, Charters Towers Region, Queensland, Australia. It was built in 1897. It is also known as Charters Towers & Dalrymple Historical Society Folk Museum. It was added to the Queensland Heritage Register on 21 October 1992.

== History ==
Lyall's Jewellery Shop is a small masonry shop built in 1897 for David Lyall to replace his previous jewellery shop on the same site. Constructed at the height of Charters Towers' prosperity, it is notable for its elaborate frontage featuring large display windows of curved plate glass.

The Charters Towers gold field was discovered in late 1871 and by 1872 there was a major rush on the field. In 1874, according to goldfield regulations, the business area of the town was set out on an area thought to be non-auriferous (not containing gold). This area occupied one square mile centred on the intersection of Gill and Mosman Streets and became the commercial and social heart of the city.

When it became clear that Charters Towers was more than a transient gold field, permanent buildings began to be erected and the area was surveyed. As was common with gold fields, the survey clarified and confirmed what already existed with regard to property and this can be seen in the variety of lot sizes within the grid superimposed on the settlement. It is well demonstrated by the block on which Lyall's is built which has a frontage of only 4.22 metres (13.8 ft) and was purchased freehold by Richard Binder in 1876. Binder was an assayer and jeweller and probably already had an office on the site as the fee paid was nominal and probably simply covered the survey costs.

In July 1889, Binder sold the property to David Lyall, who had been working in Charters Towers as a jeweller and watchmaker since at least 1886. His advertisements in the Northern Miner from the Mosman Street address stated that any article of jewellery could be made on the premises to a standard of workmanship equal to be best in London or Edinburgh.

Lyall was developing his business at the height of Charters Towers importance as a gold field. In the 1880s mining shares in the field were subject to a major boom in speculation as foreign capital was poured into mining the deep reefs that characterised the field. For a time, Charters Towers was the second town in Queensland, known to its inhabitants as "The World" and was internationally famous. Its peak production was reached in 1899 followed by a decline. By 1912 many people were leaving the town and in 1916, production officially ceased.

In 1897, however, this peak had not yet been reached and Mosman Street was now lined with substantial buildings. On 4 December, Lyall opened a new shop on his small site which was intended to completely eclipse his competitors. It was brilliantly lit with electric light, had expensive and fashionable fittings and two striking semicircular display windows made of curved plate glass. Extravagant claims for the new shop as a "palace of wonders", made by Lyall in his opening day advertisement in the Northern Miner, are supported by photographs of the exterior and interior of the shop featured in the 1897 Christmas Edition of the North Queensland Register. A few days after the opening, when the magazine of the Mills United mine blew up, Lyall's was one of the very few buildings in town whose windows were not blown out. This was noted locally and was possibly due to the curved glass.

Lyall's was a well-known and prestigious shop where one purchased special gifts. Lyall was financially successful and eventually owned a second premises in Gill Street in 1903 and a house called "Towervilla" on Richmond Hill. He died in 1910 and the shop passed to Rebecca Lyall. It was then run by a succession of managers and was advertised as Lyall's until 1915. Under the management of first Wilson, then Boner and then Miller the shop functioned as both an optometrists and a jewellery shop. In 1939 the shop was sold to Michael Hegarty and passed to Mary Hegarty in 1954. It changed hands only once more, in 1957, when it was sold to Stanley Shong, before being purchased by the Charters Towers and Dalrymple Historical Society in 1970.

The Historical Society was formed in 1968 in response to strong public interest in the history of the city. Between 1968 and 1970 the society held several public exhibitions of items donated to its collection in order to gain funds to purchase a building that could be used as a community museum. Much of the work needed to repair Lyall's was carried out by local volunteers and the materials donated, so that the museum was able to open in the building on 1 November 1970.

In 1975, Lyall's was gifted to the National Trust of Queensland. The collection had grown too large to be displayed at Lyall's and was removed to the Zara Clark Museum in the former Bartlam's Store.

== Description ==
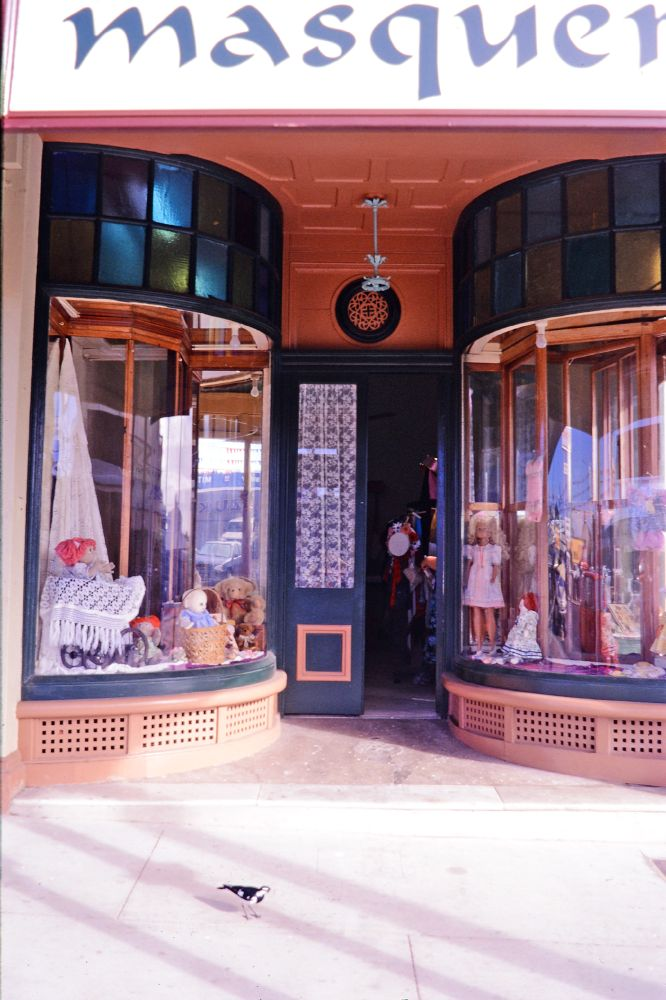
Shopfront showing the curved plate glass windows, 1997

Lyall's Jewellery Shop is a small, single story shop constructed of rendered brick. It has an unusually fine shop front with a recessed entrance between two large display windows of curved plate glass, above ornate timber ventilation grilles. Panels of small, coloured glass panes are above the windows. Another large display window glazed with flat glass is to the side of the shop. There is a gas light over the doorway. The original cedar panelled doors survive, as do sash windows in the side and rear walls.

The hipped roof is not visible from the street and is now clad in Zincalume. The convex awning to the street is clad with corrugated iron and supported by slender cast iron posts. The cast iron lace valance between the posts does not survive. The balustraded parapet is flanked with pedestals topped with moulded anthemions.

At the rear of the store, which has a central door between two large plain windows, there is a new toilet block erected by the neighbouring theatre development which has replaced the original back verandah.

The interior is intact and is divided into three parts; the largest section towards the street being retail space, a section to the rear which was probably used as workshop or office space and a strong room for precious metals, gems and stock. The strongroom has a brick floor, instead of the timber floors used elsewhere in the store. Its door, which was possibly metal, is now missing. No display counters remain, but the cedar framed display cases, made to fit the windows, do survive.

== Heritage listing ==
Lyall's Jewellery Shop was listed on the Queensland Heritage Register on 21 October 1992 having satisfied the following criteria.

The place is important in demonstrating the evolution or pattern of Queensland's history.

The store is situated on an extremely narrow block which demonstrates the manner in which many goldfield towns were surveyed. Lyall's Jewellery Store contributes to an understanding of the development of north Queensland because its demonstrates, as a fashionable jeweller's shop of high quality, the wealth and importance of Charters Towers in the late nineteenth century.

The place demonstrates rare, uncommon or endangered aspects of Queensland's cultural heritage.

The curved plate glass display windows which are the most distinctive feature of the Lyall's shop front are the only known example in Queensland.

The place has potential to yield information that will contribute to an understanding of Queensland's history.

The shop is intact and by its display space, working area and strongroom has the potential to demonstrate the way in which the business of a small manufacturing jeweller of the period was run.

The place is important in demonstrating the principal characteristics of a particular class of cultural places.

The shop is intact and by its display space, working area and strongroom has the potential to demonstrate the way in which the business of a small manufacturing jeweller of the period was run. The large timber ventilation grilles beneath the windows also show adaptation to the needs of a tropical climate.

The place is important because of its aesthetic significance.

It has aesthetic value as a competent architectural design in a late Victorian style which is generally well liked by the community.
