= Day Dawn mine remains, Charters Towers =

Day Dawn mine remains
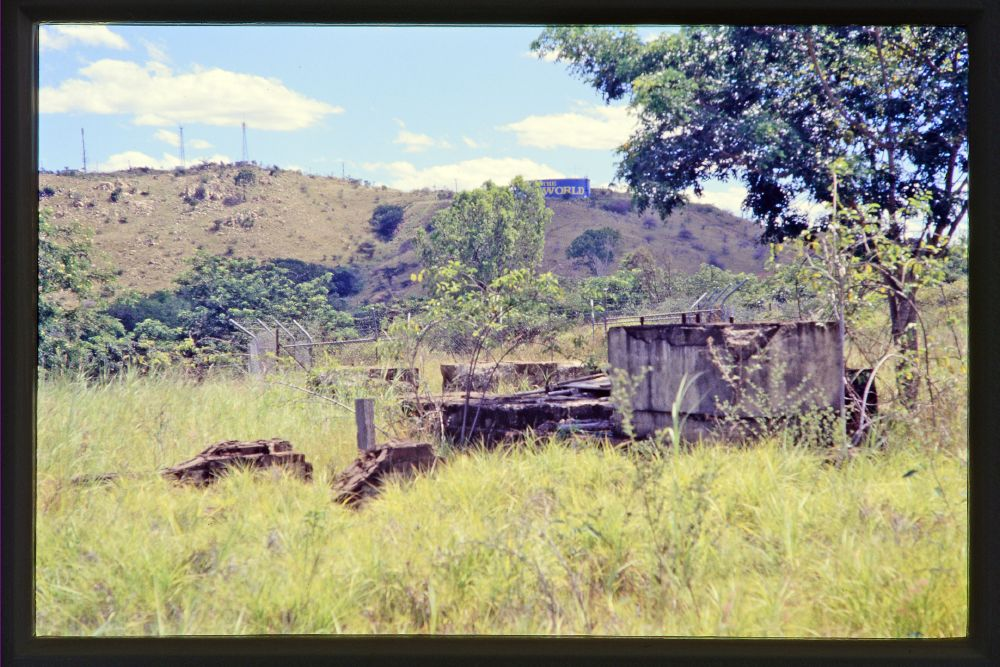
- Day Dawn PC No.3 Shaft mine remains, 2001

- Location within Queensland Location within Australia
- 20.0835°S 146.2583°E
- Location: Paull Street, Charters Towers City, Charters Towers, Charters Towers Region, Queensland, Australia

History
- Design period: 1870s–1890s (late 19th century)
- Built: 1891–1913

Queensland Heritage Register
- Official name: Day Dawn PC No.3 Shaft mine remains
- Type: state heritage (archaeological)
- Designated: 29 April 2003
- Reference no.: 602200
- Significant period: 1891–1913 (fabric, historical)
- Significant components: magazine / explosives store, mounting block/stand, shaft

Day Dawn mine remains is a heritage-listed mine ruins at Paull Street, Charters Towers City, Charters Towers, Charters Towers Region, Queensland, Australia. It was built from 1891 to 1913. It was added to the Queensland Heritage Register on 29 April 2003.

== History ==
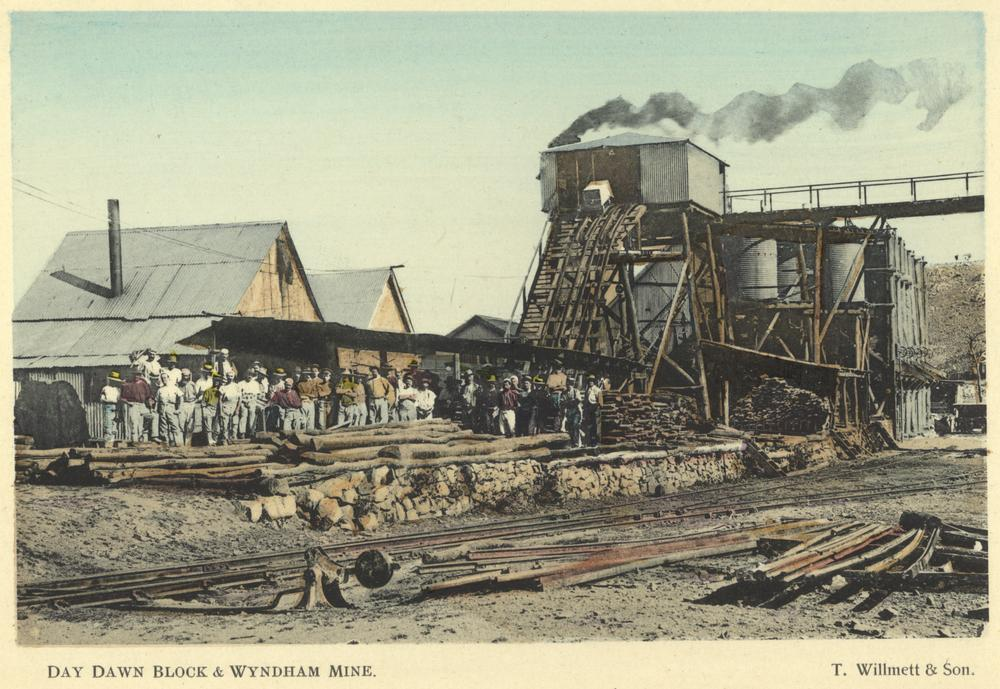
Day Dawn Block and Wyndham Mine, 1904

The Day Dawn PC No. 3 mine was a part of the Day Dawn Prospecting Claim which was the first lode mine to turn out £1,000,000 worth of gold in Queensland. This took place in 1898.

Discovered in late 1871, Charters Towers became the richest of the North Queensland mining fields. The field was proclaimed a town in 1877, and by the early 1880s was a prosperous settlement which made a major contribution to the social, political and economic development of North Queensland.

The original Day Dawn P.C. was taken up by a group of German miners and was the first to give Charters Towers a good start. The ground was first worked in 1874 and was for many years a "stringer". In the hands of Frederick Pfeiffer and his partners Christian and Levers, the wealth of the Day Dawn Reef at a depth of 200 feet (61 m) was found in 1878. All at once the stone came in 4 feet (1.2 m) thick of 3 ounces (85 g) stuff. The reef widened as far as 20 feet (6.1 m) and occasionally went to 5 ounces (140 g) to the ton. The Day Dawn PC ranked as the fifth largest producer on the Charters Towers goldfield with 275,128 long tons (279,543 t) crushed for a return of 379,859 ounces (10,768,800 g) of gold. From 1902 onwards the returns grew less. The mine was closed in 1913.

In June 1887 the mine was sold to an English company for £470,000 and used the name Day Dawn P. C. Gold Mining Company. Returns for the first five years (1887 to 1891) were 120,722 ounces (3,422,400 g) of gold with total dividends of £155,000.

The Day Dawn PC No. 3 mine was put down as a vertical shaft by this new English owner some time around 1891 to work the eastern portion of the Day Dawn Claim, which had increased in size from 24 to over 55 acres (22 ha). It was sunk to cut the Eastward Ho reef and to prospect a big portion of the Rainbow Flat. The original Day Dawn PC together with the No. 2 to the west were underlie shafts. To the east the No. 4 was put down some time after. In 1897 No. 3 shaft turned out 9,500 long tons (9,700 t) for 15,000 ounces (430,000 g).

Gold Production for the Day Dawn PC from 1881 to 1913 was 75,128 long tons (76,334 t) of ore raised for a return of 379,859 ounces (10,768,800 g) and dividends returning £638,00. It was the goldfield's 5th mine in terms of value of output.

When in use the shaft was in three compartments. In 1898 it is known the vertical descent of the shaft was 868 feet (265 m) with two underlies going north east and north west. The total depth at the time was 1,078 feet (329 m). The capital brace was 40 feet (12 m) high and was quite distinctive with a long raised walkway to the east. The head frame was an open timber structure. In 1897 The North Queensland Register listed the equipment on the surface to include a 430-ton hopper, a stone breaker, a 28 hp engine, two air compressors, two robey boilers, six rock drills and an underground air machine.

== Description ==
The shaft is open and well defined behind a chain wire safety fence (14 by 14 metres (46 ft × 46 ft)) that was erected in the late 1960s by the Charters Towers City Council. A temporary wire chain safety fence has been placed on the eastern side presumably to render safe this side from subsidence. The shaft is open and intact. 50 metres (160 ft) to the south-west is a brick magazine. Substantial foundations for mine machinery associated with the mine lie to the north. The Day Dawn PC No. 4 is in evidence to the east as has a temporary safety fence around it. The USL on which the shaft lies is heavily grassed and is generally clear of other built or natural features.

== Heritage listing ==
Day Dawn PC No.3 Shaft mine remains was listed on the Queensland Heritage Register on 29 April 2003 having satisfied the following criteria.

The place is important in demonstrating the evolution or pattern of Queensland's history.

Mine Remains at the Day Dawn PC No. 3 shafts are located on what was one of Australia's most productive gold fields and reflects the importance of the mining industry to the development of North Queensland. In association with other surviving mining sites, the place has the ability to demonstrate the pattern of Queensland's mining history. The remains of the Day Dawn PC No. 3 along with the machinery mounts, powder magazine, and water tank are the few tangible remains of the Day Dawn era of mining on the Towers. The original Day Dawn PC and the No. 2 shafts have been destroyed. However the vista of the Day Dawn ridge with Frederick Pfeiffer's villa residence still intact in nearby Paull Street coupled to the outline of the tramway that connected these mines to the Excelsior Mill provides evidence of the nature and scope of mining activity that permeated most aspects of life in Charters Towers from 1872 to 1918.

The place has potential to yield information that will contribute to an understanding of Queensland's history.

These remains of surface infrastructure and their surrounding cultural landscapes have the potential to yield information about the nature and scope of mining activity during this period.
