= Ay Ot Lookout =

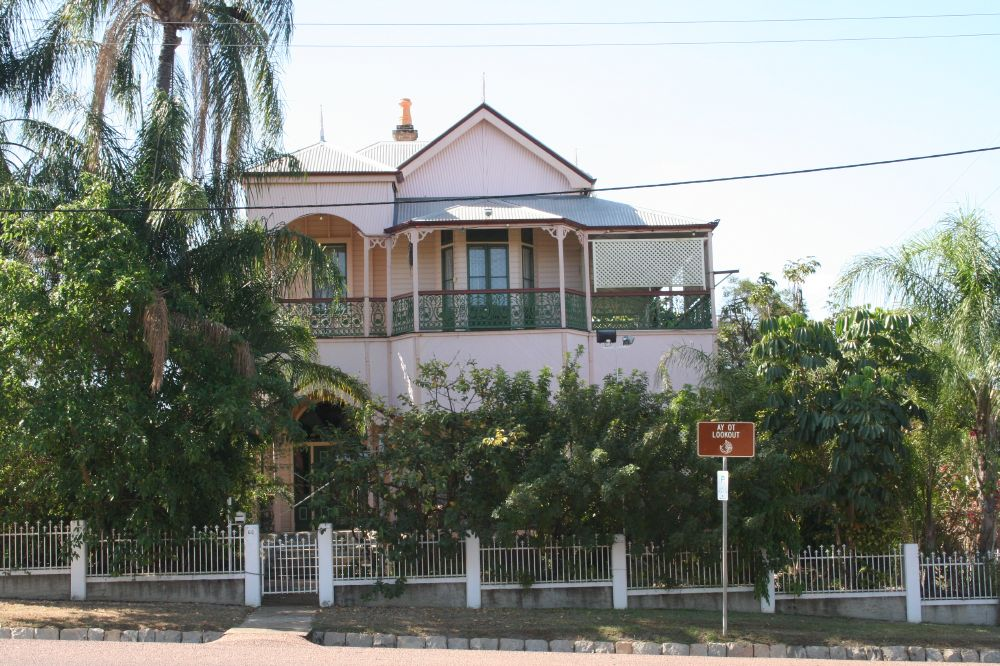
- Ay Ot Lookout, 2009

- Location within Queensland Location within Australia
- 20.0776°S 146.2629°E
- Location: 63 Hodgkinson Street, Charters Towers City, Charters Towers, Charters Towers Region, Queensland, Australia

History
- Design period: 1870s–1890s (late 19th century)
- Built: 1890s

Site notes
- Architect: William White
- Architectural styles: Victorian Filigree, Queenslander

Queensland Heritage Register
- Official name: Ay Ot Lookout
- Type: state heritage (built)
- Designated: 21 October 1992
- Reference no.: 600404
- Significant period: 1890s (fabric, historical)
- Significant components: cellar, residential accommodation – main house, kitchen/kitchen house

Ay Ot Lookout is a heritage-listed villa at 63 Hodgkinson Street, Charters Towers City, Charters Towers, Charters Towers Region, Queensland, Australia. It was designed by William White and built in the 1890s. It was added to the Queensland Heritage Register on 21 October 1992.

== History ==
Ay Ot Lookout was erected in the 1890s, when Charters Towers was experiencing an economic boom, and is one of a number of substantial residences constructed during that period, including Thornburgh House and the former Pfeiffer House.

Discovered in late 1871, Charters Towers became the richest of the North Queensland mining fields. The field was proclaimed a municipality in 1877. The construction of the Great Northern railway created easy access to the port at Townsville, solving the problem of high freight costs experienced by many other mining fields. Charters Towers gold was in deep reefs and the equipment needed to extract and process it was financed by substantial southern and overseas investment. The town became a prosperous centre providing employment for a considerable number of people. About 2,500 children were being educated in several schools, there were eight churches, three newspapers, two iron foundries, a hospital, fire brigade, jockey club and gasworks. In the late 1880s and 1890s, handsome public buildings rose to replace the modest structures of the early township. Gold output peaked in 1899, as did a population of 26,500. Several wealthy citizens built substantial homes in the town. Frederick Pfeiffer, owner of the Day Dawn mine, erected his house some time after 1882 and mining magnate E. H. T. Plant had built the opulent villa, Thornburgh, by 1890.

The Deed of Grant for the land on which Ay Ot Lookout stands was issued to John Brown in 1880, but he sold it soon afterwards to Felix McElroy, who in turn sold to Henry Collins in 1885. The date of construction of Ay Ot Lookout is uncertain, but it is believed to have been built for Thomas Smith who purchased the property in September 1895. Smith, a mill manager, took out a mortgage of £2000 in August 1897 which may have been connected with the construction of the house.

The house was designed by William White, who was born in Cornwall, England, and qualified as a mining surveyor in Bendigo. He arrived in Charters Towers in 1887 and during the 1890s also practised as a land surveyor and architect. In 1900 he became an instructor at the School of Mines. He died in Charters Towers on 17 March 1911.

Ay Ot Lookout was sold in February 1904 to Herbert Foxlee, a prosperous merchant who owned shops conveniently close to the house. Foxlee is thought to have named his new home after his childhood home Ay Ot Farm in Hertfordshire, England. The Foxlee family have been the longest occupants of the house, owning it until it was sold to Charles Brownson in 1952.

By the time the property was purchased by John and Dorothy Scott in May 1968 the house had become run down. The Scotts put the house into good repair during the nine years that they owned the property and also amassed a large collection of antique furniture from the Charters Towers district. This was auctioned off before the house was sold in 1977, in spite of community appeals to all levels of government to purchase the house and the collection.

Ay Ot Lookout was sold to Mount Leyshon Gold Mines Limited in the 1980s and is now used as a club for their employees and is opened to visitors as a museum.

== Description ==
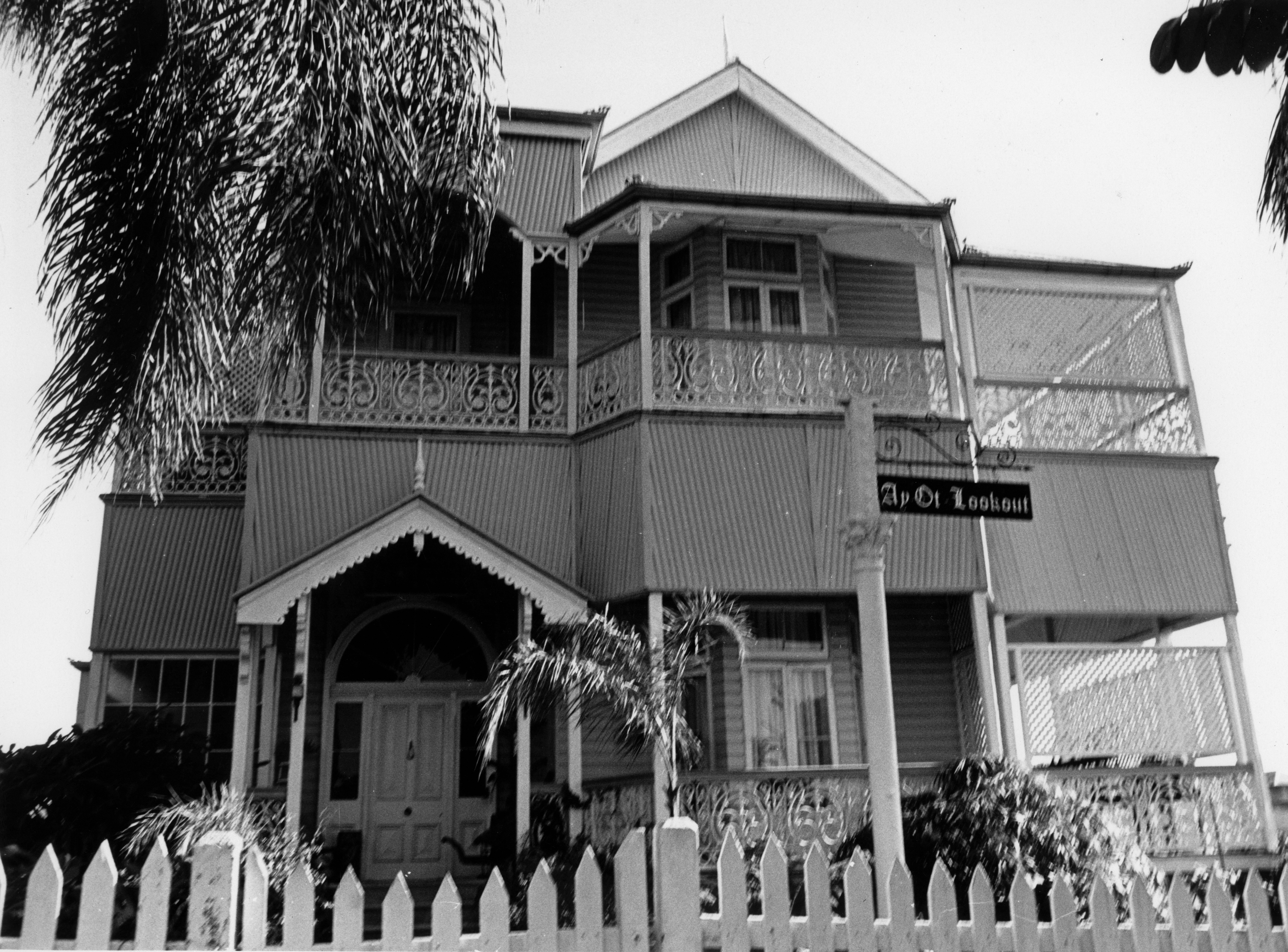
Ay Ot Lookout

Ay Ot Lookout is located on the corner of Hodgkinson and High Streets, one block away from the business centre along Gill Street.

The two storey house is constructed of timber with an exposed stud frame which has been used to decorative effect and has a complex gabled roof clad in corrugated iron. The wide verandahs on both levels have ornate cast iron balustrading and timber handrails. The supporting posts are timber with timber capitals and brackets. There is a deep valancing between the floors. The front of the house has a bay in the verandah at both levels next to the main entrance. This is marked by a square porch which extends beyond the verandah and rises through the upper storey, so that it resembles a tower. The front door, surmounted by a large semicircular fanlight, opens into an entrance foyer; a large area with a chequerboard black and white Italian marble floor, a turned timber staircase and panelled ceiling.

The workmanship in the house is of high quality and the internal joinery is cedar. The ground floor rooms have high ceilings and there are fireplaces to the drawing and dining rooms. The kitchens have been remodelled and modernised. The house has a small cellar. To the rear of the house there is an attached single storey structure with a chimney which was probably a kitchen annexe.

== Heritage listing ==
Ay Ot Lookout was listed on the Queensland Heritage Register on 21 October 1992 having satisfied the following criteria.

The place is important in demonstrating the evolution or pattern of Queensland's history.

Charters Towers, as an extraordinarily rich goldfield, made a major contribution to the economy of Queensland and to the development of the North in the late 19th century. Ay Ot lookout, as a large and elegant villa, demonstrates the wealth and confidence of Charters Towers at the height of its prosperity, when many high quality buildings were constructed in the town.

The place is important in demonstrating the principal characteristics of a particular class of cultural places.

Ay Ot Lookout is important as a good example of a fashionable villa of its era.

The place is important because of its aesthetic significance.

It has aesthetic value as a competent architectural design in a late Victorian style which is generally well liked by the community. That this is so is evidenced by the public concern for its preservation voiced in the Charters Towers media in the 1970s and beyond.
