= St Columba's Church Bell Tower =

Bell Tower, St Columba's Church
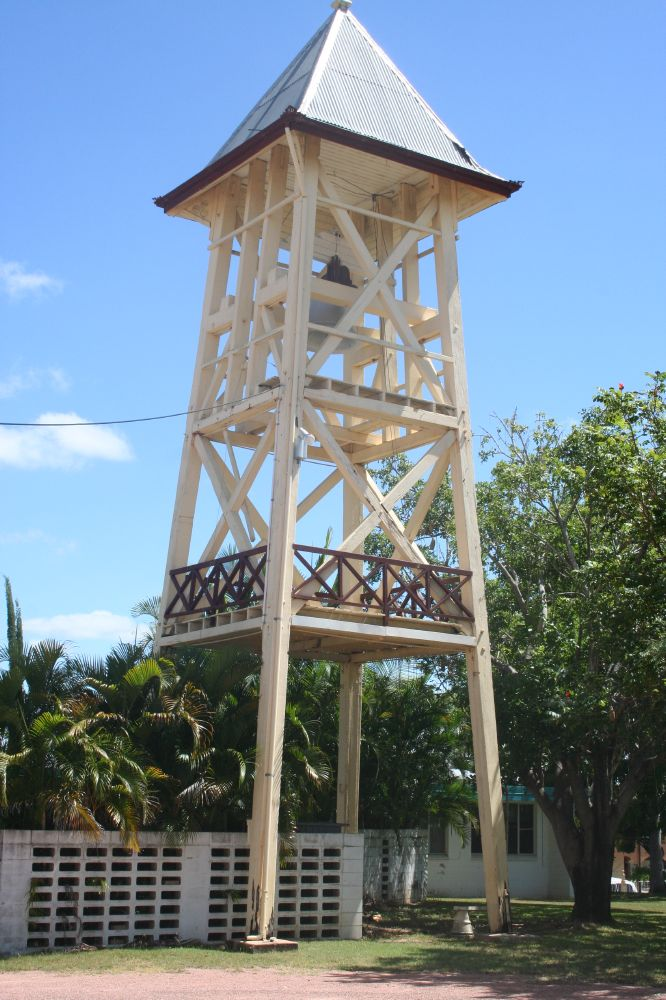
- St Columba's Church Bell Tower, 2008

- Location within Queensland Location within Australia
- 20.0772°S 146.2617°E
- Location: 134 Gill Street, Charters Towers City, Charters Towers, Charters Towers Region, Queensland, Australia

History
- Design period: 1870s–1890s (late 19th century)
- Built: 1897–1898

Site notes
- Architect: Charles William Smith

Queensland Heritage Register
- Official name: Bell Tower, St Columba's Church
- Type: state heritage (built)
- Designated: 21 October 1992
- Reference no.: 600399
- Significant period: 1897–1898 (fabric)

The Bell Tower of St Columba's Church is a heritage-listed bell tower of the Catholic Church located at 134 Gill Street, Charters Towers City, Charters Towers, Charters Towers Region, Queensland, Australia. It was designed by Charles William Smith and built from 1897 to 1898. It was added to the Queensland Heritage Register on 21 October 1992.

== History ==
The bell tower at St Columba's Church is a timber framework set on a concrete base and supports a Burns & Oats bell. It was constructed in 1897 and was probably designed by Charles William Smith, architect for the 1898 church

Soon after the establishment of the gold field in early 1872 and a visit to the field by Bishop of Brisbane James Quinn, the Catholic Church erected temporary church buildings at Charters Towers, Queenton and Millchester. A Father Dunham was initially appointed to serve these churches but left within a year. St Columba's church was erected on the Just in Time mining lease at Queenton, but for some years it was served only intermittently by visiting priests. The first incumbent was Father Denis Houhy who arrived on 6 January 1876. Mining activity on the Just in Time lease increased and in November 1878 several blocks of land were purchased for the church on the corner of Gill Street and what was to be Church Street. The church from the Just In Time lease was moved to the Gill Street site but was destroyed in a storm in September 1879. A new church was built in 1880 and the remains of the old one recycled to provide a school building.

In November, 1890 a new and most energetic Irish pastor arrived, Reverend Father Comerford. Finding the church buildings inadequate and decaying, he set a major building program in motion. The school and church were enlarged and a fine new convent built for the Sisters of Mercy, who had been enduring primitive accommodation. In 1893, he began collecting for a new bell tower and bell, which was ordered from the London foundry of Burns and Oats at a cost of £210.

A tower to house the bell was constructed in 1897–1898 at a cost of £325/17/3. At this time major extensions and alterations were being carried out to the church to the design of Charles William Smith, Charters Towers partner of the firm of W.G. Smith & Sons. The account for the belltower includes architect's fees and it is probable that the tower was also designed by C.W. Smith. Both were completed in 1898, the new church being capable of seating 1000.

The work carried out on site in the 1890s, including minor items like offices and stabling, amounted to £9,900 worth of work. and provided facilities at the time "far surpassing anything in North Queensland". The majority of the cost and an outstanding parish debt was paid by the end of the decade, a remarkable feat in an era marked generally by financial depression, and is a testament to the support of the congregation and the prosperity of Charters Towers. In 1902 bracing was carried out to the frame work of the belltower and the concrete foundations were reinforced in 1923.

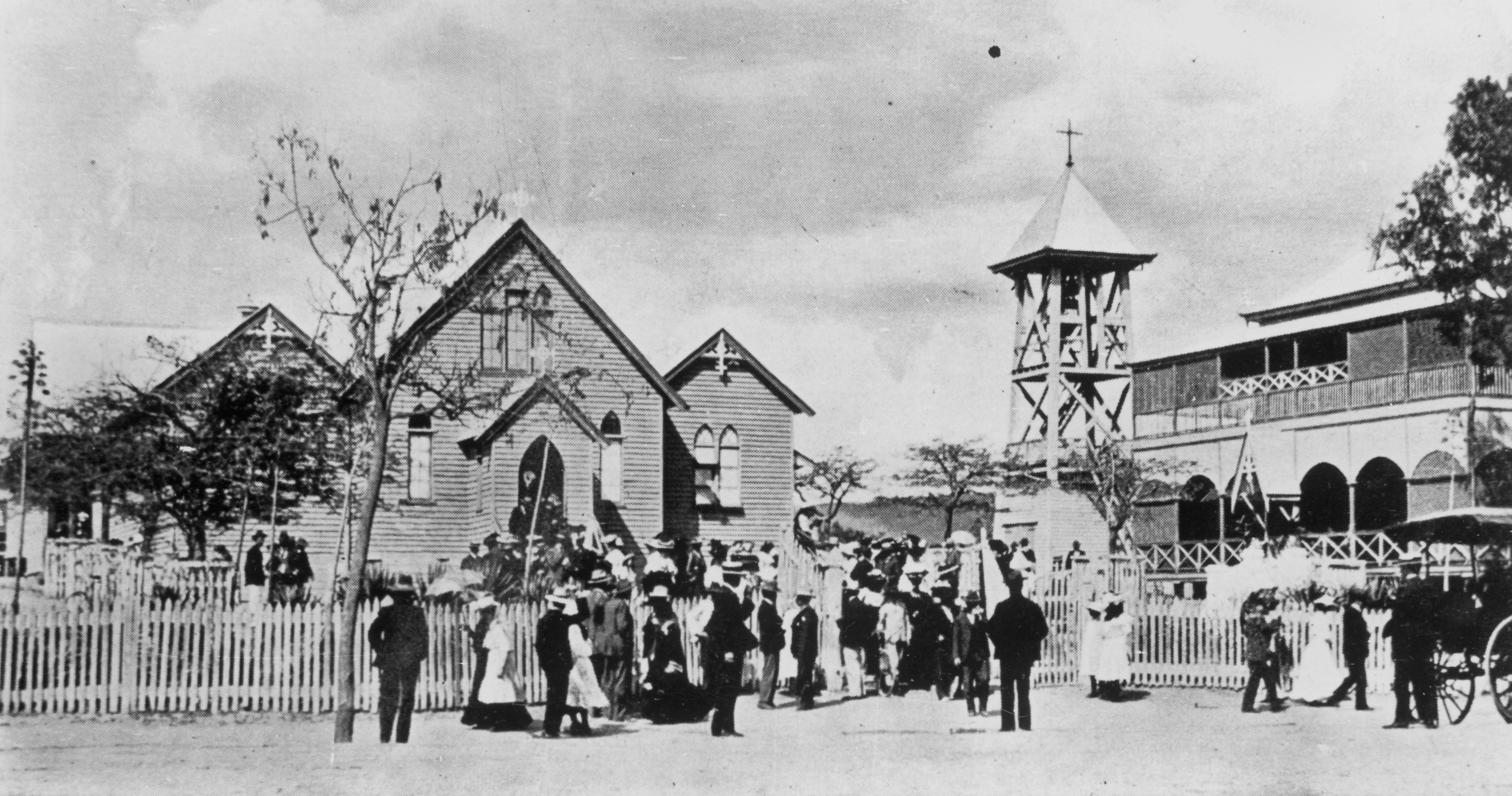
St Columba's Roman Catholic Church (no longer extant) and the bell tower, circa 1903

St Columba's church was listed by the National Trust of Queensland in 1973 along with the presbytery and bell tower. The tower is now the only building left from the nineteenth century complex of buildings on site. It was repaired and painted when the new church was built in 1974 and this may have been when the weatherboards that originally enclosed the base of the tower as a small shed were removed. The stair that allowed access to the bellringer's platform has also been removed and the platform now has cross braced balustrading instead of the original dowels.

== Description ==
The bell tower is constructed of heavy dressed and painted timbers and consists of four structural members forming legs which are strengthened by cross-bracing. It has a steeply pitched pagoda roof topped by a cross. Small acroteria decorate the corners of the roof, which is clad with corrugated iron. The tower is hung with a Burns & Oats bell. There is a bellringer's platform finished with cross braced balustrading, however, there is no stair to permit access and the legs of the tower are now exposed. The tower is visible from some streets away and is a local landmark.

== Heritage listing ==
The Bell Tower of St Columba's Church was listed on the Queensland Heritage Register on 21 October 1992 having satisfied the following criteria.

The place is important in demonstrating the evolution or pattern of Queensland's history.

The bell tower is the last surviving structure from a major church precinct in Charters Towers and is evidence for the development of the Catholic Church in North Queensland and the prosperity and importance of the Charters Towers goldfield in the nineteenth century.

The place is important because of its aesthetic significance.

The belltower has been a landmark in the city since 1897, its massive timber frame suggesting an era when the Charters Towers landscape was dotted with other timber towers which supported the winding machinery for mines.

The place has a strong or special association with a particular community or cultural group for social, cultural or spiritual reasons.

St Columba's belltower is important for its association with the history of the Parish as the only nineteenth-century structure remaining on a site occupied by Roman Catholic Church buildings since the 1870s.
