= Australian Bank of Commerce, Charters Towers =

Australian Bank of Commerce
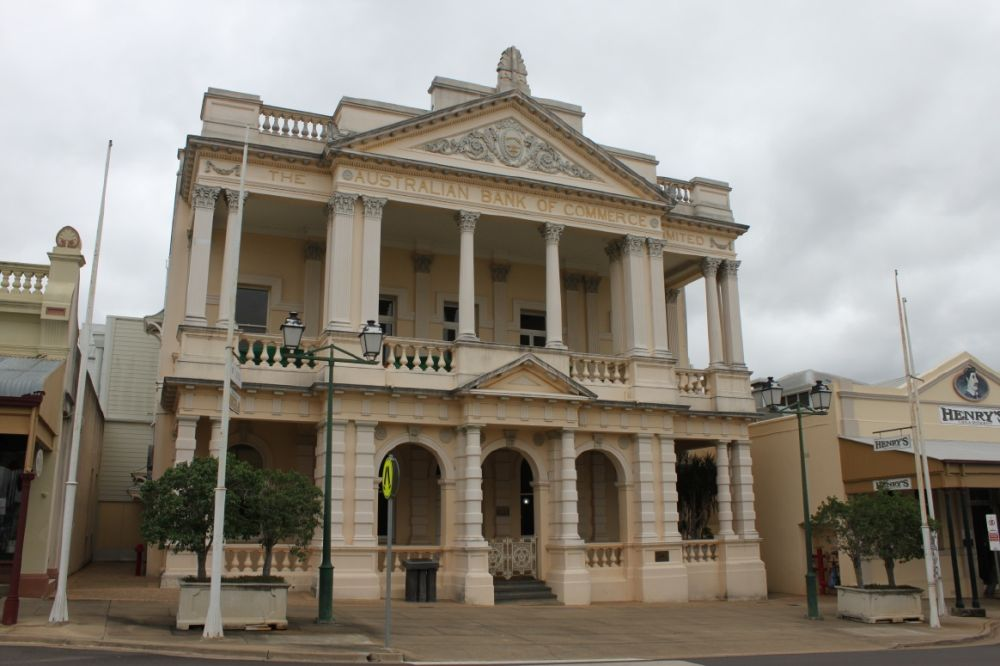
- Australian Bank of Commerce (now The World Theatre), 2012

- Location within Queensland Location within Australia
- 20.0763°S 146.2565°E
- Location: 86 Mosman Street, Charters Towers City, Charters Towers, Charters Towers Region, Queensland, Australia

History
- Design period: 1870s–1890s (late 19th century)
- Built: 1891

Site notes
- Architect: Francis Drummond Greville Stanley
- Architectural style: Classicism

Queensland Heritage Register
- Official name: Australian Bank of Commerce (former), The Australian Joint Stock Bank, The World Theatre
- Type: state heritage (built)
- Designated: 21 October 1992
- Reference no.: 600407
- Significant period: 1890s (fabric); 1891–c. 1931 (historical use)
- Significant components: banking chamber, residential accommodation – manager's house/quarters
- Builders: Wyatt & Gates

Australian Bank of Commerce is a heritage-listed former bank building at 86 Mosman Street, Charters Towers City, Charters Towers, Charters Towers Region, Queensland, Australia. It was designed by Francis Drummond Greville Stanley and built in 1891 by Wyatt & Gates. It is also known as The Australian Joint Stock Bank and is now The World Theatre. It was added to the Queensland Heritage Register on 21 October 1992.

== History ==
The former Australian Bank of Commerce is a substantial masonry building in classical revival style located in the business centre of Charters Towers. It was built in 1891 as the premises of the Australian Joint Stock Bank to the design of Queensland architect FDG Stanley during the boom years of the gold field.

The Charters Towers field was discovered in late 1871 by a prospecting party composed of Hugh Mosman, George Clarke, James Fraser and an Aboriginal boy called Jupiter who worked for Mosman. By early 1872 a rush was in progress with an estimated 4,500 people on the field by the end of the year. During this time Charters Towers yielded 91,265 ounces (2,587,300 g) of gold; more than half the total Queensland production.

The Australian Joint Stock Bank was established with the discovery of gold in southern states and opened branches on Queensland goldfields as they were discovered. It opened a branch on the Broughton goldfield on 23 April 1872, but soon moved to Charters Towers and then to nearby Millchester, where crushing plants, banks and businesses had begun to cluster. In 1874, following goldfield regulations, a business area was marked out in Charters Towers over an area believed to be non-auriferous. A sub-branch of the bank was opened there on 12 October 1874 and became a full branch in 1876. In 1877, when Charters Towers petitioned for incorporation as a municipality, the business area was defined as covering 0.5 miles (0.80 km) in each compass direction from the intersection of Gill and Mosman Streets. This area became the key business and social centre of the town.

The economics of Charters Towers were closely bound up with the geology of the field. The gold was in the form of reefs of gold-bearing ore which sloped downwards with loops and branches. This meant that equipment to sink shafts and extract and crush ore was needed. At first, small syndicates of miners, crushing mills and local business men financed the mines. As the lodes ran deeper, more capital was needed to exploit them than was available locally. In 1886, a display featuring ore samples from the Charters Towers mines was set up at the Colonial and Indian Exhibition in London. At the time, some mines were producing extraordinary quantities of gold. The response from British investors resulted in a speculation boom. This did not hold, collapsing in 1888, but as the famous Brilliant Reef was discovered in the following year, the fortunes of the field were not depressed for long. The excellent long-term prospects of the field and the input of capital made the community affluent and encouraged local businesses to replace their timber buildings with more substantial brick structures in the 1880s and 90s.

The Australian Joint Stock Bank purchased land for a new building in 1884 and in 1889 approved the plans for a handsome new bank, but decided that their allotment was inadequate for the structure. They purchased another block from Burns, Philp & Co. in May 1890 for £3610. Tenders were called for the new building and that of J James for £4693 was accepted, though he defaulted and the building was completed by Messrs Wyatt & Gates.

The new bank building was designed by architect Francis Drummond Greville Stanley. He was a gifted and prolific Scotsman who had been the Queensland Colonial Architect between 1873 and 1881, and in 1888 became the inaugural president of the Queensland Institute of Architects. He had designed many large and prestigious public and commercial buildings, including a number of banks. The new premises opened in early 1892 with banking facilities including a gold room on the lower floor and accommodation for the manager above, a standard arrangement in regional banks.

By the end of 1892, the Australian Joint Stock Bank had become the largest bank in Queensland having 19 branches. It was the biggest gold buyer on the Charters Towers field and carried many accounts, but it eventually became overextended. In April 1893, the AJS Bank closed during the national banking crisis which saw 8 banks shut their doors. After restructuring, the bank opened for business again on 16 June 1893 as the Australian Joint Stock Bank Limited. Charters Towers continued to prosper with gold production on the field peaking in 1899 at 319,572 ounces (9,059,700 g). The population also peaked in this year at around 26,500. Charters Towers was then the second most important city in Queensland and an internationally noted goldfield.

In 1909 a new banking company, the Australian Bank of Commerce, was formed incorporating the Australian Joint Stock Bank Limited and commenced business in this building on 1 January 1910. By this time, the gold yield in Charters Towers had fallen while costs had increased due to the great depths at which gold was being mined. In 1912 the Warden reported that the extreme depth for profitable mining had been reached. The population quickly fell as many people moved to coastal towns. Falling real estate values and large vacant buildings provided an opportunity for a number of private schools to establish themselves, which eventually gave new economic life to Charters Towers as an educational centre.

Following the merger of the Australian Bank of Commerce and the Bank of New South Wales in 1931, the amalgamated business was carried on in the Bank of New South Wales premises in Gill Street. The former Bank of Commerce building ceased to be a bank and was used as accommodation for bank officers. It was sold to Dr W Stevens for £450 on 9 March 1937, the low price in comparison to the original cost being a reflection of the times. Dr Stevens initially lived on the upper floor and used the ground floor for his medical practice. Later he moved downstairs and rented the upper level to Mr and Mrs Walker who lived there until 1958. Dr Stevens moved out in 1947 and Norman Dungavell rented the ground floor as an office and family home, purchasing the property in July 1957 and continuing to rent out the upper floor flat. Norman Dungavell died in 1989 and his wife in 1991. In 1992 the building was purchased by the Shire of Dalrymple with a view to developing the site as a cultural centre. The new theatre complex was designed by Theatre Technics and GTG Partnership. The World Theatre complex was opened in September 1996.

== Description ==
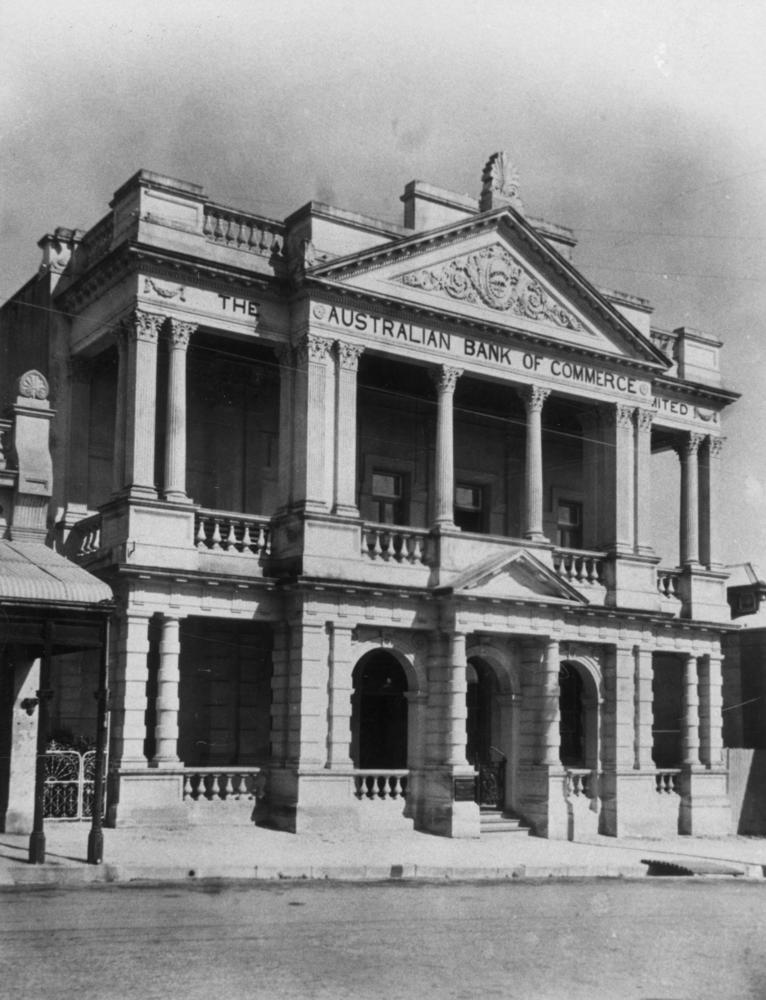
Australian Bank of Commerce, circa 1920

The former bank building now forms an entry foyer, gallery and offices for "The World" Theatre complex. This is a large, modern theatre and cinema complex which has been built to the rear of the building and is linked to it by a roof and courtyard area, though remaining essentially separate from it. From Mosman Street, the bank has maintained its appearance as a freestanding building, separated by narrow alleyways from the buildings on either side, which are Lyall's Jewellery Shop and former Bright's mining exchange, both from the same era as the bank.

The former Australian Bank of Commerce is a two-storey classical revival building constructed of rendered brick with a corrugated iron roof concealed by a balustraded parapet. The street elevation is symmetrical and has a colonnade of banded Doric columns at ground level and one of Corinthian order above, surmounted by a triangular pediment with an ornate tympanum. The central entrance has a small pediment and is approached by low steps. Directly across the colonnade from the entrance are double doors to a draft lobby which takes the form of a timber aedicule leading into the large banking chamber, which is now an entrance foyer. The form of the building is essentially unchanged and the flanking offices are still used as such. The main room is lit by lantern and ventilator towards the rear. This is set with panels of etched and coloured glass in red, blue and green. Beyond this, there are doors leading into the courtyard of the new complex. The upper floor is accessed by a large cedar staircase with carved and turned balusters. It is U-shaped in form around the lantern and is now a gallery. A high quality of detail is evident in the building in such features as plaster mouldings, cedar joinery and encaustic tiles to the banking chamber, stair lobby and entrance.

== Heritage listing ==
The former Australian Bank of Commerce was listed on the Queensland Heritage Register on 21 October 1992 having satisfied the following criteria.

The place is important in demonstrating the evolution or pattern of Queensland's history.

Charters Towers, as an extraordinarily rich goldfield, made a major contribution to the economy of Queensland and to the development of the North in the late 19th century. The former Bank of Commerce, built as the Australian Joint Stock Bank, demonstrates the wealth and confidence of Charters Towers at the height of its prosperity, when many high quality buildings were constructed in the town.

The place is important in demonstrating the principal characteristics of a particular class of cultural places.

Although the building has undergone some modifications, it is still a good example of a high quality bank building of its era and was designed by one of Queensland 's most influential architects.

The place is important because of its aesthetic significance.

It has aesthetic value as a well designed and finely detailed building which forms an important part of a group of substantial 19th century commercial buildings in Mosman Street. These include the Royal Hotel, the Stock Exchange Arcade and the former Queensland National Bank, also designed by Stanley, and are key components of the character of the city centre.

The place has a special association with the life or work of a particular person, group or organisation of importance in Queensland's history.

The former Australian Bank of Commerce is important as a major commercial building by F.D.G. Stanley, who made a significant contribution to the development of the built environment in Queensland, both as the Colonial Architect and in private practice. It is also associated with the Australian Joint Stock Bank, at one time the largest bank in Queensland.
