= Pollard's Store =

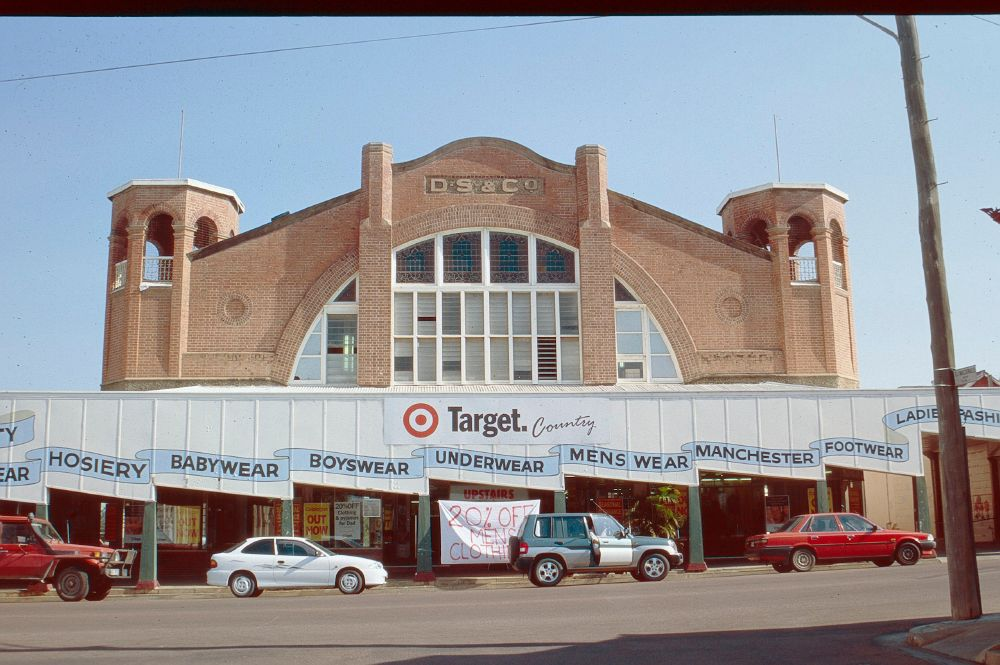
- Pollard's Store, as Target Country

- Location within Queensland Location within Australia
- 20.0763°S 146.2575°E
- Location: 18 Gill Street, Charters Towers City, Charters Towers, Charters Towers Region, Queensland, Australia

History
- Design period: 1900–1914 (early 20th century)
- Built: c. 1909–1930s

Queensland Heritage Register
- Official name: Fossey's Store, Charters Towers, Daking-Smith & Company, Pollard's Store
- Type: state heritage (built)
- Designated: 3 October 1996
- Reference no.: 601259
- Significant period: 1900s, 1930s (fabric) c. 1909–ongoing (historical use)
- Significant components: tower, lead light/s

Pollard's Store is a heritage-listed department store at 18 Gill Street, Charters Towers City, Charters Towers, Charters Towers Region, Queensland, Australia. It was built from c. 1909 to 1930s. It was also known as Daking-Smith & Company and Fossey's Store. It was a Target Country store until it was converted to the K Hub format in 2021. It was added to the Queensland Heritage Register on 3 October 1996.

== History ==
The building was constructed c. 1909 for Daking-Smith and Co., drapers, furnishers and boot merchants, on the former site of the old Queens Hotel which had been demolished in 1906.

Between the years 1872 and 1969 the Charters Towers field produced 6,624,683 fine ounces of gold, and the Ravenswood field for the same period, 901,007 fine ounces. Peak production in the Charters Towers' mines was reached in 1899, when 319,572 fine ounces were produced. When Alfred Daking-Smith commissioned his grand department store building c. 1909, the economy of Charters Towers was buoyant and robust although the output of gold was starting to decline.

Although Charters Towers already had a single-storeyed departmental drapery store owned and run by the merchant brothers Joseph and Richard Arida, Daking-Smith believed that a more modern, "genteel" shop was required for Charters Towers. He realised the commercial value of building along the lines of Melbourne and Sydney's emerging department stores, which recognised that shopping, as distinct from merely purchasing supplies, had evolved as an essentially female activity.

Between 1860 and 1920, with the industrialised world's rising level of affluence and leisure time, the "art of shopping", once the prerogative of the wives of the wealthy, was adopted eagerly by the wives of the emerging middle classes. By the mid-19th century department stores were evolving world-wide to accommodate the rising numbers of middle class shoppers. The earliest of the "grand" department stores was Aristide Boucicaut's Bon Marche, opened in Paris in 1852, followed by Macy's in New York in 1860. These provided important models, but in the Australian colonies, the department store was also the logical extension of the typical general store, drapery or ironmongery.

To complement the refined department store environment, the customer experienced a superior quality of service, the object of which was to make her feel special and confident. Often this entailed an attitude of deference, but more commonly in Australia this developed into a "cheerful, sensible, polite efficiency". Whichever method was employed, the aim was the same: to encourage spending.

At the turn of the century Charters Towers, with its multi-cultural population, was known colloquially as "The World". Its isolated geographical position, accommodating a population of approximately 30,000 in 1899, seemed to justify the erection of a substantial, modern department store to service both the residents of Charters Towers and the wealthy surrounding district.

The impressive architectural style of the Daking-Smith building was unique for a remote North Queensland town. The locally manufactured bricks were unusual in a privately commissioned building of this era and location, demonstrating that little expense was spared in the construction.

Stan Pollard commenced working at Daking-Smith & Co.'s store in 1912 at the age of sixteen, however, in 1925 Daking-Smith's business was wound up and the store stood empty for a number of years. In 1928 a ten-year lease of the building was taken by the ACB company, who conducted a mail order service for a short period before becoming insolvent. During this period Stan Pollard opened his own small menswear business alongside the Daking-Smith store in Gill Street, and by 1934 was able to purchase the Daking-Smith building in partnership with John Hall.

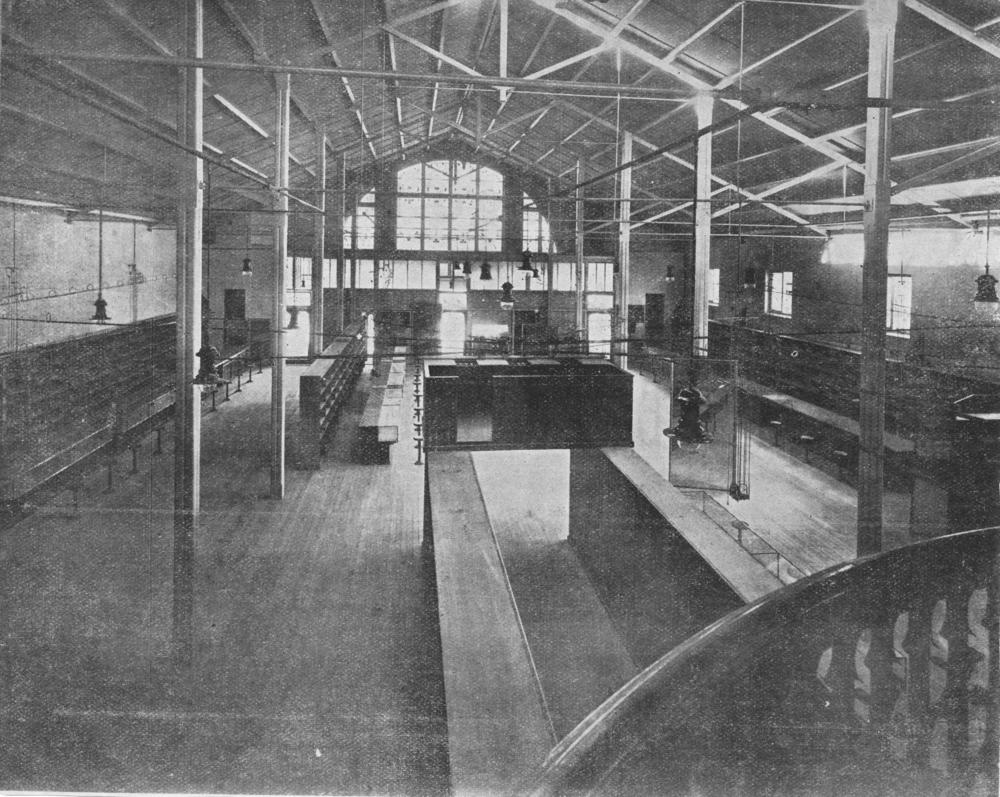
Interior, 1909

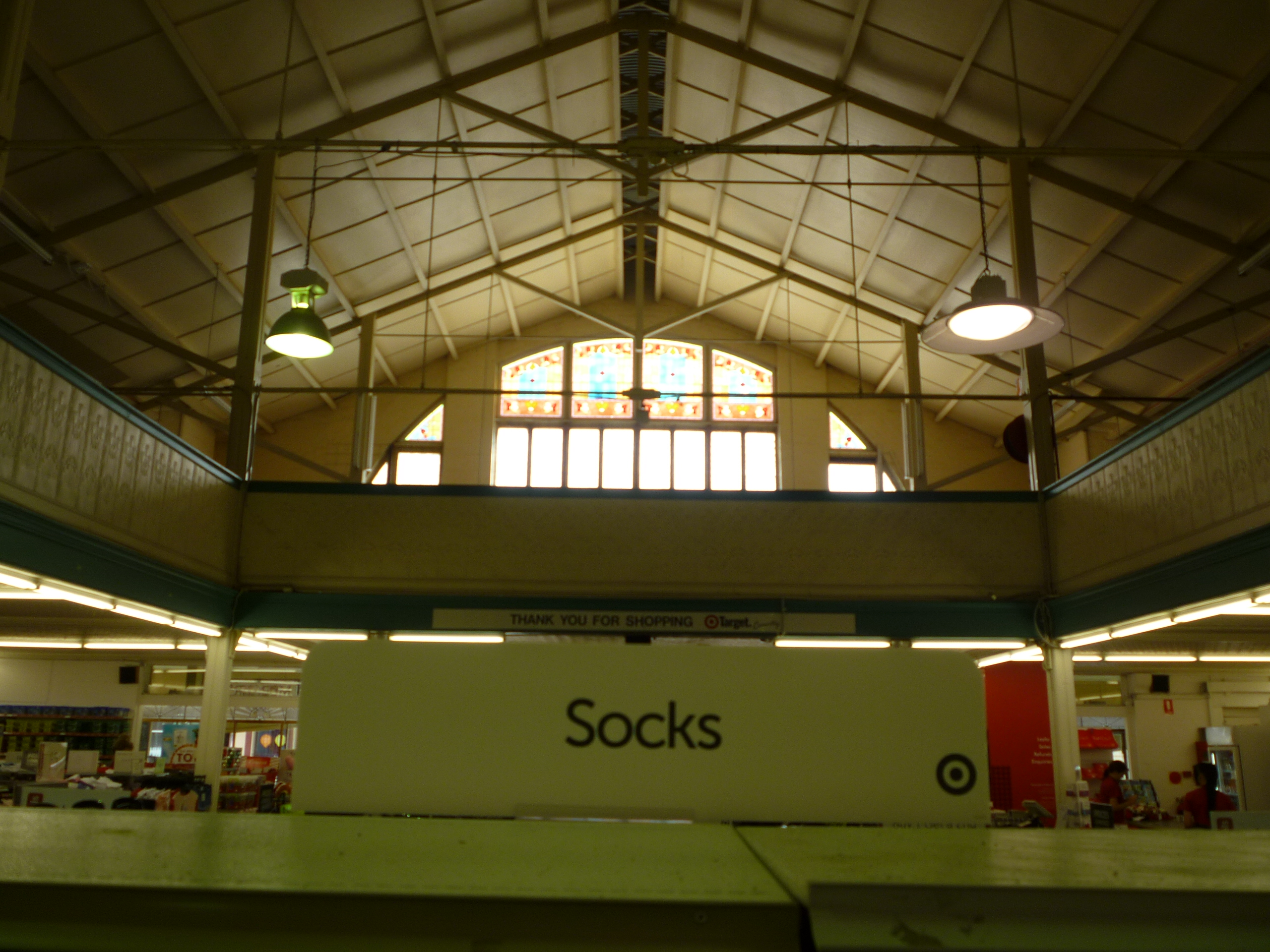
Interior, 2014

Stan Pollard had the store remodelled, removing the floor-to-ceiling plate glass windows and using them to construct "island" display windows. This remodelling saw most of the second level removed, and the cashier's station moved to the back of the store, then later relocated to a central position. The Lamson Paragon Central Money Exchange System (a cash carrier system) was installed when Mr Pollard bought the department store in 1934 and was removed only after Fosseys moved into the premises in 1993. Stan Pollard & Company issued two catalogues a year, which not only circulated in Charters Towers, but were sent to the increasingly wealthy, outlying pastoral regions. In the early days of the store large amounts of stock were purchased, usually to last for six months at a time. Hats, dresses, sheets and all types of manchester were made on the premises, therefore huge quantities of materials were stocked upstairs. Twelve women worked in the millinery room and a similar number in the dress-making room. These women, who provided a quality service to the community, trained in the upstairs workrooms of the store where the latest styles in clothing were interpreted quickly and usually only with the aid of illustrations. The store also sold glassware, gifts and toys.

During the Second World War, five American air bases, totalling 15,000 personnel, were established in Charters Towers as a defence against the perceived threat of Japanese invasion. The Royal Australian Air Force and the Australian Army were also present in the area. The extensive and sudden population increase placed heavy demands on the resources of Charters Towers. During this period the "Big Store" became a favourite shopping place for military personnel.

Stan Pollard & Co. conducted business at the "Big Store" until 16 January 1993. The building was leased to Coles Myer as a Fosseys store since August 1993. In 1996, Coles Myer rebranded it as a Target store, then as a Target Country store, and in January 2021 as a K Hub.

== Description ==
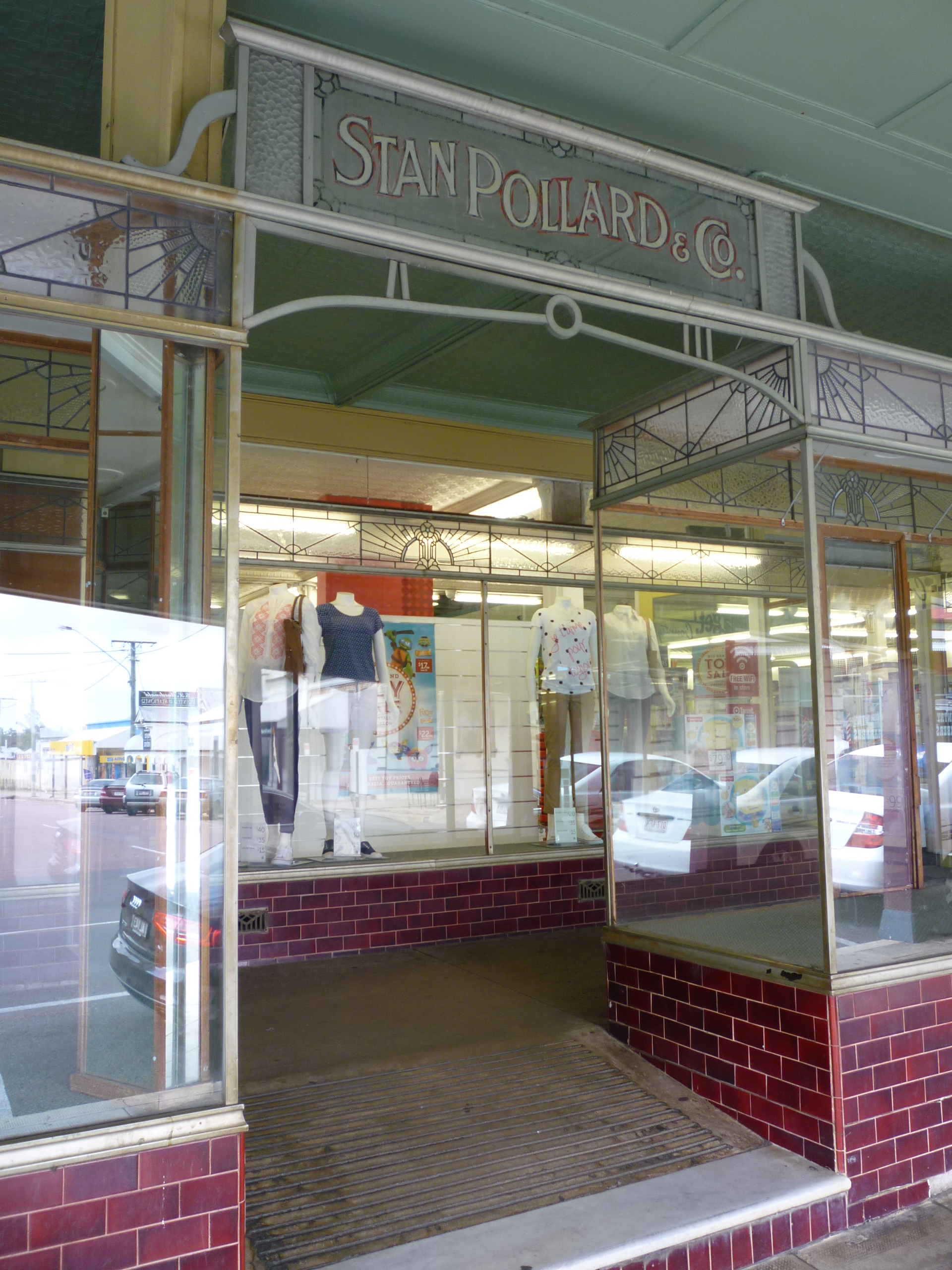
Entrance, 2014

The former Pollard's Store stands at the western end of Gill Street, near the corner of Mosman Street, in the central business district of Charters Towers. This part of the town's main street also has a number of other prominent commercial and civic buildings.

The store is a two-storeyed building with an imposing street facade constructed of locally manufactured red bricks. The parapeted gable has a curved apex, piers projecting above the parapet, a large semi-circular window located centrally and octagonal towers at each end. Below the apex is a panel with the rendered letters "D S & Co." (Daking-Smith & Co.). The brick piers divide the parapet and the window into three. The upper sashes of this window have leadlight stained glass. To each side of the window are small circular recesses in the brickwork. The octagonal towers have elongated arched openings to each face with wrought iron balustrading, flat roofs and spires. The building exhibits characteristics of the turn of the century Federation architecture expressed in a commercial building in a free interpretive style.

The gabled roof is of corrugated galvanised iron, with a vented ridge and glazed rooflight located centrally.

To the street facade is an awning extending over the footpath. Framed in timber, it has a valance and parapet of fibrous cement sheet cut to a sawtooth between the posts. At the entry to the store are island plate glass display cases with red tiled bases, brass framing and leadlight upper panels. This area has a pressed metal ceiling and cornices. Above each entry is a sign painted on the glass including "Stan Pollard & Co." at the central bay.

The sides and rear of the building are of unpainted brickwork. Also to the rear facade but smaller than that of the front is a semi-circular leadlight window. Service access to the rear is via a laneway.

Internally, the building has a mezzanine level around a central well, with substantial columns of steel and timber. To the underside of the mezzanine is in extensive pressed metal ceiling and cornices, with a pressed metal cladding also to the balustrade. The ceiling to the store is raked, exposing the timber roof trusses.

== Heritage listing ==
The former Pollard's Store was listed on the Queensland Heritage Register on 3 October 1996 having satisfied the following criteria.

The place is important in demonstrating the evolution or pattern of Queensland's history.

Pollard's Store reflects the wealth of the Charters Towers community and district during the early part of the 20th century. It is important in demonstrating the development of the Charters Towers area as a rich gold mining and pastoral district which made a significant contribution to the economic development of North Queensland.

The place demonstrates rare, uncommon or endangered aspects of Queensland's cultural heritage.

Pollard's Store is a rare surviving example of an early "grand" department store which brought a new style of luxurious shopping to remote North West Queensland.

The place is important in demonstrating the principal characteristics of a particular class of cultural places.

Still used as a department store, this building is important in illustrating the principal characteristics of an early 20th century department store in North Queensland.

The place is important because of its aesthetic significance.

The building makes an important aesthetic contribution, through form, scale and materials to the Charters Towers townscape and is an important component of early civic and commercial buildings in Gill and Mossman Streets including the Stock Exchange, the former Australian Bank of Commerce, the Post Office, the former Bank of New South Wales, and the former Queensland National Bank (later City Hall).

The place has a strong or special association with a particular community or cultural group for social, cultural or spiritual reasons.

The Charters Towers community has always regarded the place as an important component of the heritage of the city and an important local retail store which has served the needs of the community through most of the 20th century.

The place has a special association with the life or work of a particular person, group or organisation of importance in Queensland's history.

The place has a strong association for the community with the life and work of Stan Pollard.
