= Civic Club, Charters Towers =

Civic Club
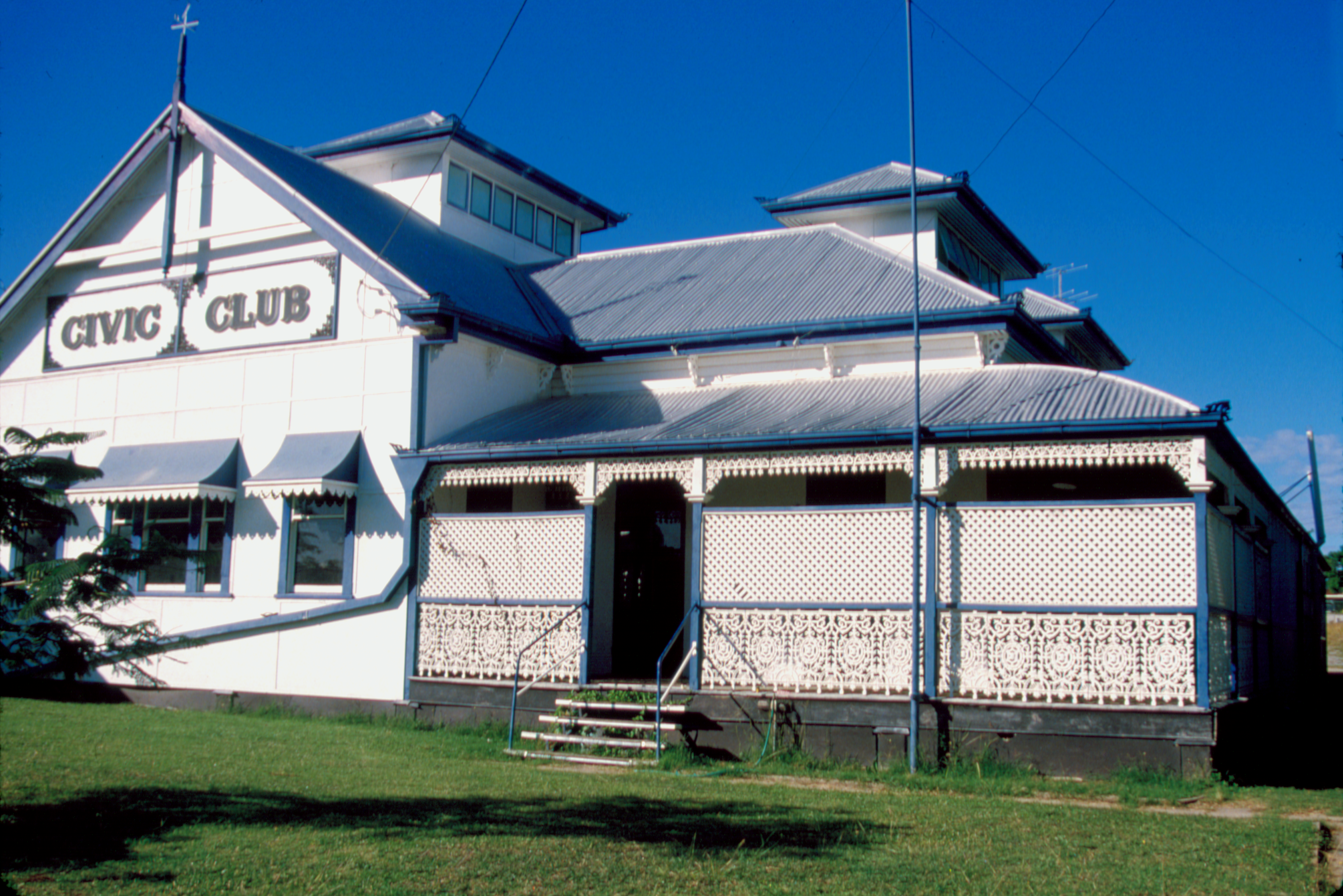
- Civic Club, 1985

- Location within Queensland Location within Australia
- 20.076°S 146.2624°E
- Location: 36 Ryan Street, Charters Towers City, Charters Towers, Charters Towers Region, Queensland, Australia

History
- Design period: 1900–1914 (early 20th century)
- Built: 1900

Queensland Heritage Register
- Official name: Civic Club, Londoners' Club
- Type: state heritage (built)
- Designated: 21 October 1992
- Reference no.: 600398
- Significant period: c. 1900, c. 1942 (fabric); 1900–1980 (historical); 1900–ongoing (social)
- Significant components: air raid shelter, other – social/community: component, billiards room

Civic Club is a heritage-listed club house at 36 Ryan Street, Charters Towers City, Charters Towers, Charters Towers Region, Queensland, Australia. It was built in 1900. It is also known as Londoners' Club. It was added to the Queensland Heritage Register on 21 October 1992.

== History ==
The Civic Club was constructed in 1900 as clubrooms providing recreational facilities for members of the Londoners' Club, which had its origins in informal meetings at the North Australian Hotel, Charters Towers, in 1877.

Discovered in late 1871, Charters Towers became the richest of the North Queensland mining fields. It developed rapidly and was proclaimed a municipality in 1877. The construction of the Great Northern railway in 1882 created easy access to the port at Townsville, solving the problem of high freight costs experienced by many other mining fields. The gold at Charters Towers was in deep reefs and the equipment needed to extract and process it was financed by substantial southern and overseas investment in mining companies. The town became a prosperous centre providing employment for a considerable number of people.

In the year when the mushrooming goldfield became officially a town, a group of mining men began meeting informally at the North Australian Hotel. Later, they were to call themselves the Londoners' Association. Hotels have always been meeting places and it was common at the time for larger hotels to provide rooms for hire to clubs and associations, usually on an upper storey. However, the convenience of meeting in a place which could readily provide food and drink was somewhat offset by noise from other patrons, the limitations placed on club members activities and a general lack of privacy. Typically, clubs that held regular meetings eventually acquired their own premises.

In 1885, Thomas Craven, a Trustee for the association purchased the land on which the Londoners' Association built their clubhouse. In the late 1880s and 1890s, Charters Towers boomed and handsome public buildings replaced the modest structures of the early township. In 1900 the association applied for a club liquor licence for their new clubhouse and were registered as the Londoners' Club. The premises were opened in May 1900 and provided a bar plus comfortable and well-lit rooms for billiards and card playing. Card games were subject to severe restrictions in hotels and the club is said to have offered all night gaming facilities. Card tables were installed with drawers to hold money, chips and, it was rumoured, gold dust and even pistols. Monthly smoke concerts were held, informal affairs where the members themselves provided the entertainment.

The membership of the club was exclusively male and comprised many of the city's most influential men. Belonging to a club, particularly one that had socially and professionally prominent members, was an important aspect of business as well as social life for many men in this era. Membership was sought after and the club visitor's book shows that overseas investors were often entertained at the club by local businessmen during the boom years. Visitors included mining men from London, South Africa, Czechoslovakia, America and New Guinea. The convivial setting provided by the club was no doubt conducive to promoting professional as well as personal contacts amongst members generally. From 1907, it was renamed the Civic Club.

The clubhouse was built in the year that the population of the city reached its peak of 27,000. Although gold production on the field had peaked in 1899 at an impressive 337,000 ounces (9,600,000 g), it soon became clear that these grades did not continue at depth. Gold prices also fell and by 1920 only one mine in Charters Towers was still operational. People, businesses and even the more portable buildings moved away from the town and by the end of the First World War the population had more than halved. This in turn led to a decline in membership of the Civic Club.

The availability of large redundant buildings in a town with a well-developed infrastructure and a rail connection suggested the possibility of establishing boarding schools to several Churches. Charters Towers soon found a new role as an educational centre and is still a major regional centre in the north. The Civic Club continued to operate and, maintaining its original billiard tables set on concrete blocks, has often organised snooker tournaments.

The Civic Club was established as a men's club and remained a male preserve until 1980, when women were admitted during a period of rejuvenation when its membership base was broadened. The Club is now one of the few surviving examples of its type in a country town.

== Description ==
The Civic Club is located in Ryan Street, Charters Towers in what is essentially a residential streetscape.

The clubhouse is a single storey building, largely of timber, with a rendered brick wall on the eastern side and fibrous cement cladding on the front. It is set on low stumps and is L shaped in form with a projecting gable to the front. There is a verandah extending across the front from the gabled section and along the side, which has a cast iron balustrade and valance linked by panels of timber latticework. The roof is clad with corrugated iron and has 3 prominent clerestories that light and ventilate each of the main rooms.

Inside, the somewhat residential appearance of the exterior is contradicted by a layout specially designed for club use and consists of 3 major rooms with a skillion roofed kitchen extension to the rear. The main rooms are timber lined with pressed metal ceilings and cornices and have pressed metal lining to the clerestories. The largest room holds billiard tables and the former card room is subdivided by decorative timber partitions. Arches link the rooms and at the rear of the card room is the bar. Toilets have been constructed on a section of the verandah adjoining it.

Most of the interior structural features are intact although the bar is not in its original form. Many of the original furnishings remain and these form an important part of the fabric of the building along with photographs, trophies, light fittings, shelving, cue racks and floor coverings.

The building is located on a reduced block of land and is now hemmed in on two sides by buildings. A high, galvanised pipe and wire fence encloses the area at the front. Some evidence of early pathways and garden edging and the front entrance remain. To the rear, in the angle of the L formed by the building, are a pergola and barbecue area and a concrete air raid shelter.

== Heritage listing ==
Civic Club was listed on the Queensland Heritage Register on 21 October 1992 having satisfied the following criteria.

The place is important in demonstrating the evolution or pattern of Queensland's history.

Charters Towers, as an extraordinarily rich goldfield, made a major contribution to the economy of Queensland and to the development of the North in the late 19th century. The Civic Club, built in 1900 as premises for an elite men's club established in 1877, reflects the interests and leisure activities of the many influential men involved in mining, commerce and the professions who were its members and patrons. The establishment of such a club in Charters Towers demonstrates the importance of this city at the turn of the century.

The place demonstrates rare, uncommon or endangered aspects of Queensland's cultural heritage.

The Civic Club is rare as a gentlemen's club, few of which were built outside the capital cities in Australia, and which is still owned and operated by this club.

The place is important in demonstrating the principal characteristics of a particular class of cultural places.

It is very intact in form and detail and is an excellent example of a recreational club with rooms specially designed to provide good conditions for playing cards and billiards.

The place is important because of its aesthetic significance.

As a prominent and well-designed building from Charter's Towers most prosperous period, the Civic Club makes an important contribution to the built character of the town in form, scale, and material.

The place has a strong or special association with a particular community or cultural group for social, cultural or spiritual reasons.

As a purpose designed clubhouse, the building has over a century's continuous association with members of the Londoners' Club/Civic Club, which continues to operate.
