= Charters Towers City, Queensland =

Charters Towers City Charters Towers, Queensland
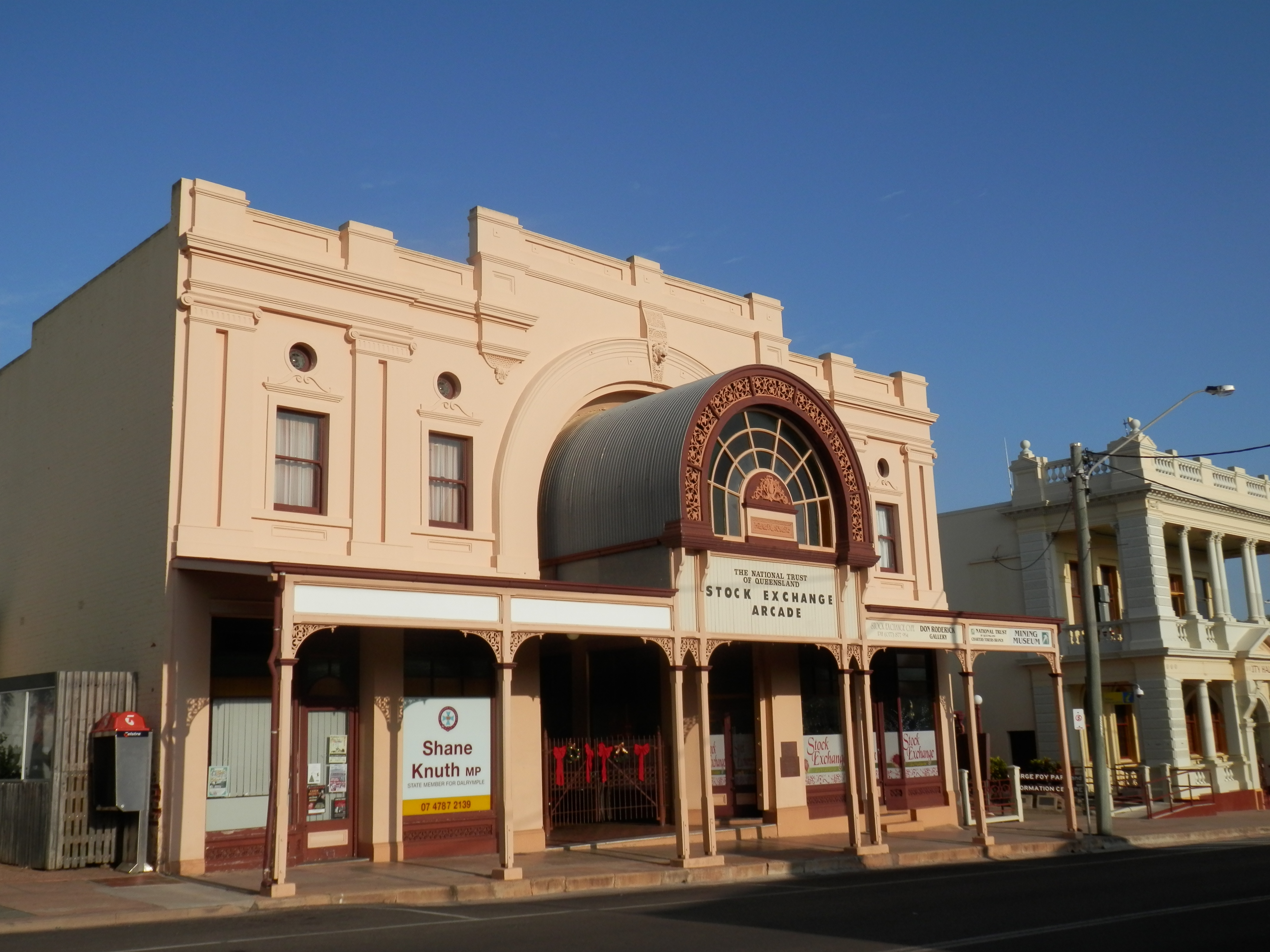
- Charters Towers Stock Exchange Arcade, 2015

- Coordinates: 20.0766°S 146.2608°E
- Population: 2,219 (2021 census)
  - Density: 765/km^{2} (1,980/sq mi)
- Postcode(s): 4820
- Area: 2.9 km^{2} (1.1 sq mi)
- Time zone: AEST (UTC+10:00)
- Location: 137 km (85 mi) SW of Townsville; 1,309 km (813 mi) NW of Brisbane
- LGA(s): Charters Towers Region
- State electorate(s): Traeger
- Federal division(s): Kennedy
Suburbs around Charters Towers City:
Grand Secret	Richmond Hill	Richmond Hill
Alabama Hill	Charters Towers City	Queenton
Towers Hill	Towers Hill	Queenton

Charters Towers City (formerly Lissner) is the central suburb and central business district of the town of Charters Towers in the Charters Towers Region, Queensland, Australia. In the 2021 census, Charters Towers City had a population of 2,219 people.

== History ==
The Central Methodist Church opened on 19 October 1879. In September 1890 It was replaced by new building. In February 1966 it was demolished to allow the present octagonal church building to be completed by June 1966. When the Methodist Church amalgamated into the Uniting Church of Australia in 1977, the church became the Charters Towers Uniting Church.

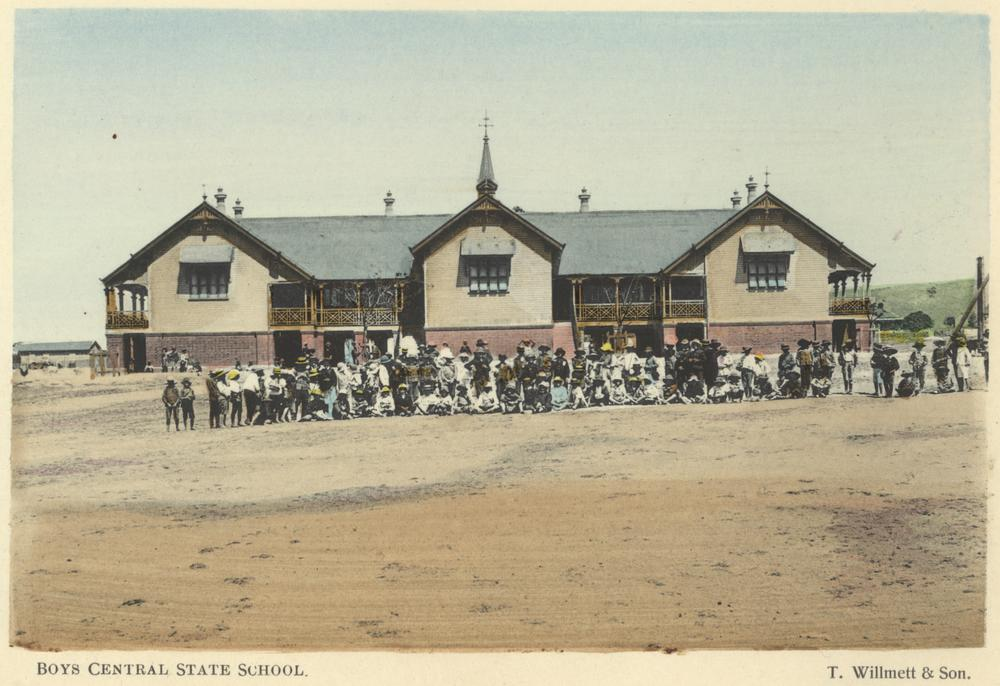
Students and staff gathered outside Charters Towers Boys State School, 1904

Charters Towers State School opened on 13 October 1875. In 1882 it divided into Charters Towers Boys State School and Charters Towers Girls & Infants State School. In 1889 the Girls & Infants school separated to become Charters Towers Girls State School and Charters Towers Infants State School, before once again amalgamating in 1912 to form Charters Towers Central Girls & Infants State School In January 1965 the Boys School and the Girls & Infants School amalgamated to become Charters Towers Central State School.

St Mary's College was opened by the Sisters of Mercy in 1882 and was amalgamated with St Columba's Primary School and Mount Carmel College to form Columba Catholic College in 1998.

In 1889, a Baptist Church opened in Charters Towers.

Charters Towers State High School opened on 22 January 1912.

The suburb of Charters Towers City was known as Lissner until 2012, when a request submitted by the Charters Towers Chamber of Commerce and Mines to better identify Charters Tower's central business district was approved. As part of the decision, some parts of the suburbs of Queenton, Grand Secret and Richmond Hill were included into the newly created Charters Towers City.

== Demographics ==
In the 2016 census, Charters Towers City had a population of 2,134 people.

In the 2021 census, Charters Towers City had a population of 2,219 people.

== Heritage listings ==
Charters Towers City has a number of heritage-listed sites, including:

- Church of Christ, Anne Street
- Boer War Veterans Memorial Kiosk and Lissner Park, Bridge Street
- Aldborough, 25 Deane Street
- Charters Towers Post Office, 17 Gill Street
- Pollard's Store (now Target), 18 Gill Street
- Bank of New South Wales Building, 34–36 Gill Street
- Charters Towers Police Station, 49 Gill Street
- St Columba's Church Bell Tower, 134 Gill Street
- Ambulance Building, 157 Gill Street
- Charters Towers Central State School, 39–47 High Street
- School of Mines, 24–26 Hodgkinson Street
- Charters Towers Courthouse, 28 Hodgkinson Street
- Ay Ot Lookout, 63 Hodgkinson Street
- Bartlam's Store (now Zara Clark Museum), Mosman Street
- ED Miles Mining Exchange, 65 Mosman Street
- Queensland National Bank, 72 Mosman Street (20.0757°S 146.2569°E)
- Charters Towers Stock Exchange Arcade, 76 Mosman Street
- Australian Bank of Commerce, 86 Mosman Street
- Lyall's Jewellery Shop, 90 Mosman Street
- Day Dawn mine remains, Paull Street
- Pfeiffer House, 2–6 Paull Street
- Charters Towers Masonic Lodge, 20 Ryan Street
- Civic Club, 36 Ryan Street
- Stone kerbing, channels and footbridges of Charters Towers (various)

== Education ==
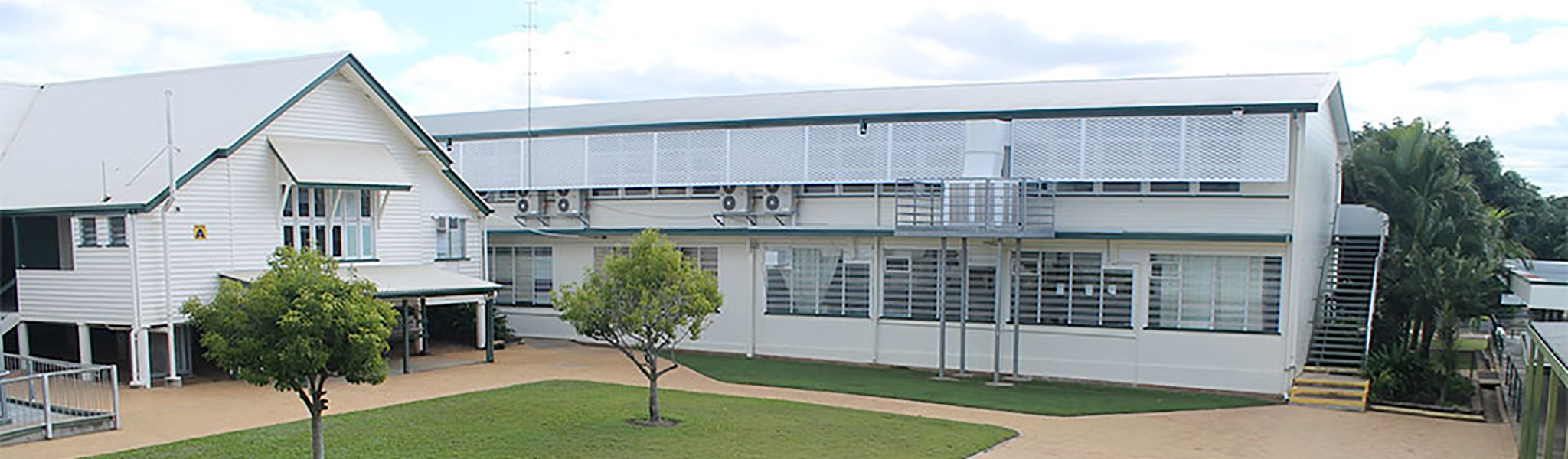
Charters Towers Central State School, 2019

Charters Towers Central State School is a government primary (Early Childhood to Year 6) school for boys and girls at 39–47 High Street (20.0801°S 146.2631°E). In 2018, the school had an enrolment of 214 students with 20 teachers (19 full-time equivalent) and 17 non-teaching staff (12 full-time equivalent). It includes a special education program.

Columba Catholic College is a Catholic primary and secondary (Prep–12) school for boys and girls. In 2018, the school had an enrolment of 491 students with 41 teachers (38 full-time equivalent) and 37 non-teaching staff (28 full-time equivalent). The St Mary's campus for primary (Prep–6) schooling and boarding facilities for girls is at 59–69 Mary Street (20.0747°S 146.2629°E), while its Mount Columba campus for secondary (7–12) schooling and boarding facilities for boys is in Richmond Hill.

Charters Towers State High School is a government secondary (7–12) school for boys and girls at 97–113 Towers Street (20.0801°S 146.2584°E). In 2018, the school had an enrolment of 449 students with 45 teachers (44 full-time equivalent) and 29 non-teaching staff (23 full-time equivalent). It includes a special education program.

== Amenities ==
Charters Towers Uniting Church is at 101 Gill Street (corner of Church Street, 20.0763°S 146.2613°E).
