= Charters Towers Masonic Lodge =

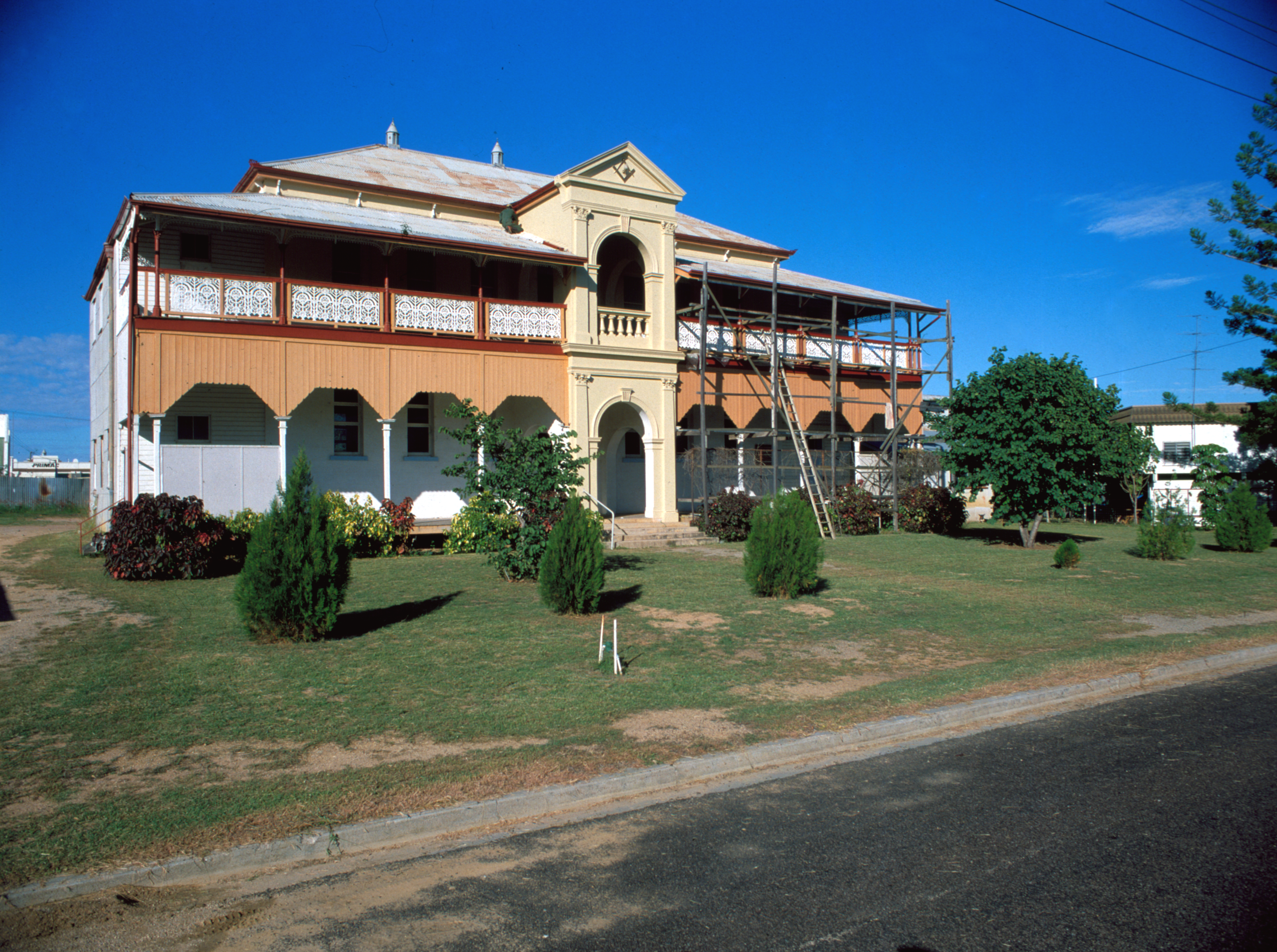
- Charters Towers Masonic Temple, 1985

- Location within Queensland Location within Australia
- 20.0758°S 146.2606°E
- Location: 20 Ryan Street, Charters Towers City, Charters Towers, Charters Towers Region, Queensland, Australia

History
- Design period: 1870s–1890s (late 19th century)
- Built: 1887–1897

Queensland Heritage Register
- Official name: Charters Towers Masonic Lodge
- Type: state heritage (built)
- Designated: 21 October 1992
- Reference no.: 600411
- Significant period: 1887, 1896–1897 (fabric); 1887–ongoing (social)
- Significant components: toilet block/earth closet/water closet, furniture/fittings, residential accommodation – housing

Charters Towers Masonic Lodge is a heritage-listed masonic temple at 20 Ryan Street, Charters Towers City, Charters Towers, Charters Towers Region, Queensland, Australia. It was built from 1887 to 1897. It was added to the Queensland Heritage Register on 21 October 1992.

== History ==
The Charters Towers Masonic Lodge was constructed in two stages in 1887 and 1896–97. The building is a prominent structure within the city, and is illustrative of the prosperity of Charters Towers in the late nineteenth century, and the importance of the Masons within the local community.

Queensland was the last Australian state to have a Freemason's Grand Lodge. The first lodges were established in Brisbane by 1859 and the first lodge in Charters Towers was established on 23 March 1875. Fourteen people were present at the first meeting held at Hishon's Hotel. Installing Master, Mr Brodziack of Townsville, installed Gold Warden, WSEM Charters, as the first Worshipful Master. Charters served two terms as Worshipful Master of this first lodge which was known as the Charters Towers Lodge No.1546EC.

The first Masonic hall, a small wooden building, was constructed on land in Gill Street which was donated by Mr Brodziack of Townsville. The building soon became too small as more lodges were formed. The St John's Davenport Lodge No.655SC approached the Charters Towers Lodge to discuss the erection of a new hall. Both lodges pooled resources, formed a company, sold shares to members and purchased the Ryan Street property on 18 September 1876.

In 1887 a new single storey hall was constructed on Ryan Street directly behind the Gill Street building. The foundation stone was laid on 30 April 1887 and the new building was dedicated on 16 September 1887 by Worshipful Master Maurice Bennett WM.

Two "commodious" shops were constructed on the former lodge site in Gill Street in 1889. Rent from these shops was used to support the work of the Masons in the town, including a yearly bursary of £25 for the education of a child of a member. Funds were also directed to the further development of the Lodge in Ryan Street.

In April, 1896 the Northern Miner stated that work had begun on the construction of a second floor to the Masonic Lodge. An article in the North Queensland Register on 18 June 1897 reported that construction of the second storey was completed.

Several grand lodges were established in Charters Towers during the early days of settlement. These lodges, reflecting the code of Freemasonry to promote the brotherhood of man, render practical aid to the less fortunate in your community, to encourage the practice of every moral and social virtue and to develop behaviour in everyday life which would reflect the teachings of the Freemasons organisation, were established by various national groups. Scottish, Irish and English Freemasons had all established lodges by 1896. These lodges, which were established mainly to offer support to miners and towns people during times of crises, also became centres of social activity.

The tradition of Freemasonry, begun in 1872, continues in the city today with five lodges operating from the Ryan Street building.

== Description ==
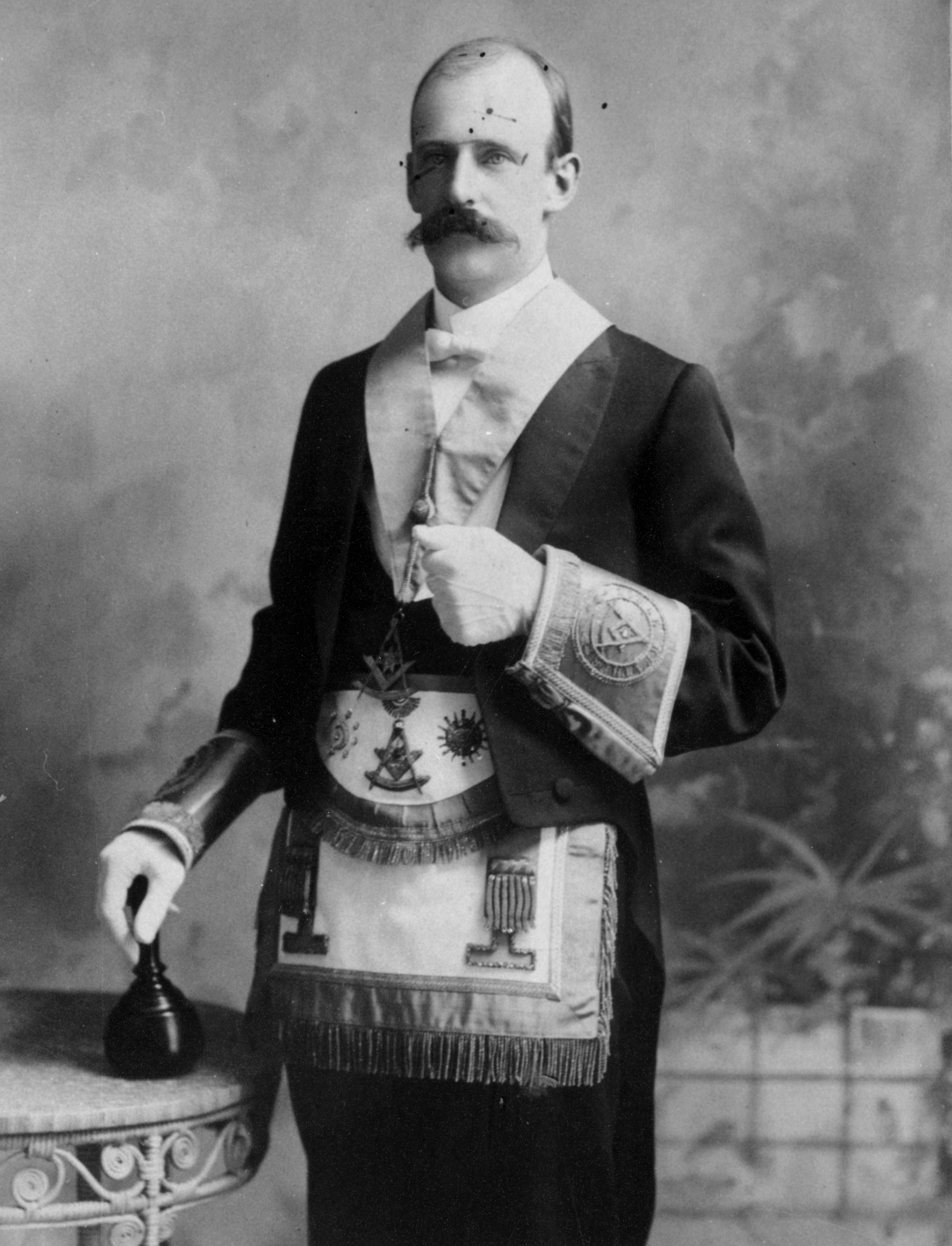
Charles E. Rigby, Freemason in Charters Towers, 1913

The Masonic Temple, Charters Towers is a two-storeyed masonry and timber building with a hipped corrugated iron roof. Facing north, it addresses Ryan Street which runs parallel to, and one block from Gill Street, the main commercial street of Charters Towers.

The building is located centrally within the flat, grassed property of two allotments. Fronting the building is a garden of shrubs and hedges.

With the height, and long side facing the street, the building is prominent amongst its mainly single-storey residential neighbours. From the upper level, the commanding view extends over the nearby houses.

The building is rectangular in plan, on an east–west axis, with a rendered brick core and timber verandahs on three sides. The two end verandahs are enclosed. The open front verandah has timber posts, boarded valance and cast iron balustrade, frieze and brackets. Centred is a two-storeyed rendered masonry entry portico, with archways pediment and balustrade.

The exterior of the core is render scored as ashlar coursing. The end verandahs are timber framed, externally clad in chamferboard, which have been further clad in fibro sheet and metal siding. The gutters have acroteria, decorative rainwater heads and moulded soffit brackets.

The core of the ground floor is a single room meeting hall. It has a high (about 4.5-metre (15 ft)) boarded ceiling, and awning windows with sills at eye height. The pair of entry doors are six-panelled with an arched fanlight. The eastern end is enclosed as a kitchen. The western end has the timber stair. It features turned balusters and newels and moulded string. Added to the rear is a small single-storey toilet block clad in fibro sheet.

The upper level has a similar layout to the ground floor, and a similar high boarded ceiling with three fretted roses, panelled doors and double hung windows. At the western end, the panelled entry doors have a ceremonial knocker and peep-hole. The hall contains furniture specific to its use as a Masonic lodge, including black and white lino centrepiece, floor, pews, thrones, podium, certificates and decrees. The layout is in accordance with Masonic practice with the Grand Master to the east.

Between the western end of the temple and the boundary is a small single-storey caretaker's cottage clad in fibro sheet.

== Heritage listing ==
Charters Towers Masonic Lodge was listed on the Queensland Heritage Register on 21 October 1992 having satisfied the following criteria.

The place is important in demonstrating the evolution or pattern of Queensland's history.

The Charters Towers Masonic Lodge demonstrates the spread of Freemasonry in regional Queensland.

The place is important in demonstrating the principal characteristics of a particular class of cultural places.

The two-storeyed building, comprising a large meeting hall on each level, is typical of the planform chosen for Masonic Lodges.

The place is important because of its aesthetic significance.

The Masonic Lodge exhibits aesthetic qualities valued by the community, in particular, it contributes to the streetscape as a prominent monumental building and is a symbol of the prosperity and importance of Charters Towers in the late nineteenth century.

The place has a strong or special association with a particular community or cultural group for social, cultural or spiritual reasons.

It has a long association with the Charters Towers community and reflects the important civic role of Masonic Lodges in the city.

The place has a special association with the life or work of a particular person, group or organisation of importance in Queensland's history.

It is significant as a place which has been in continuous use as a Masonic Centre since 1887 and the configuration of furniture and fittings has a strong association with Masonic ceremonies and the Masonic Lodge.
