= Bartlam's Store =

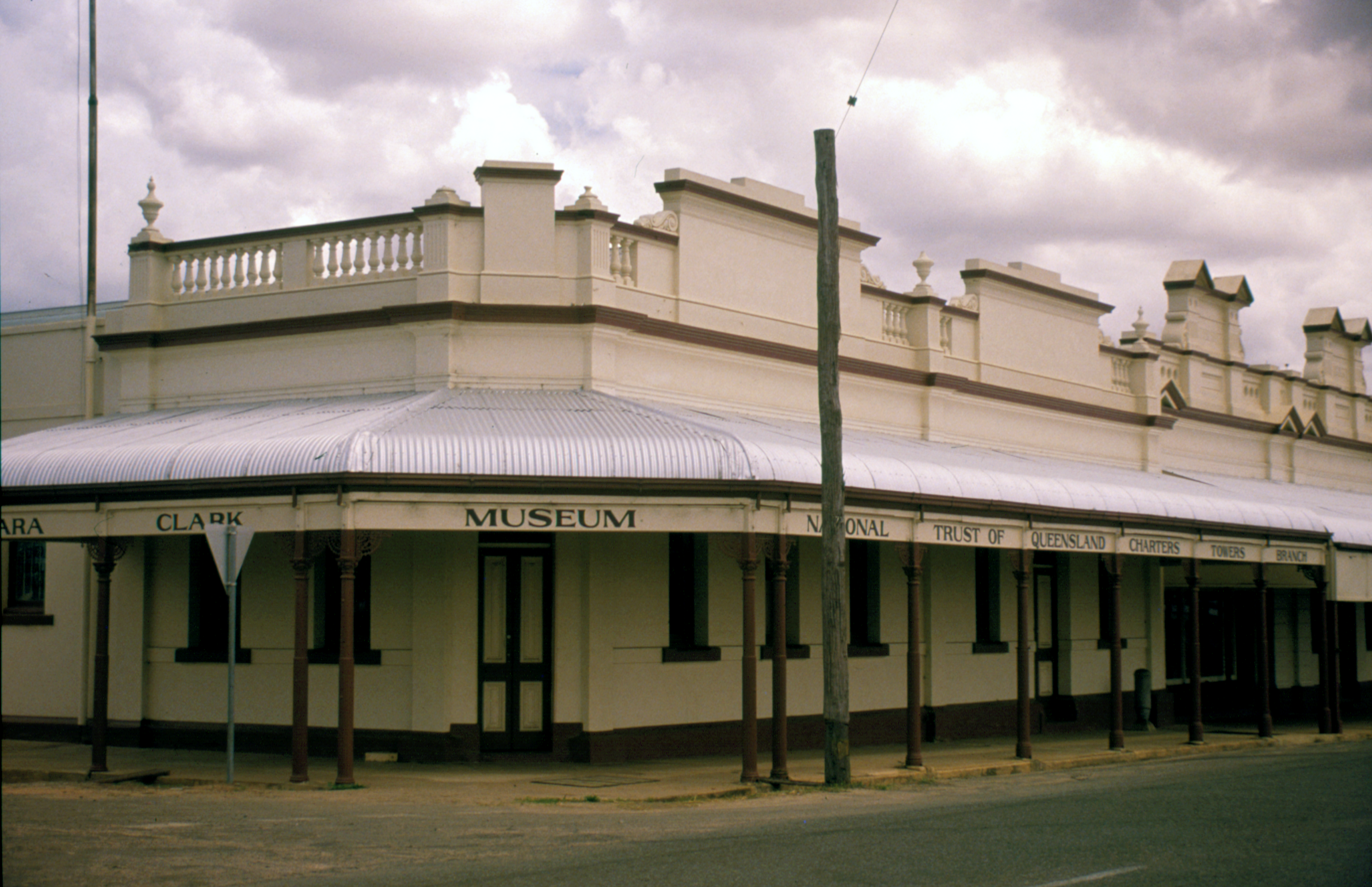
- Bartlam's Store (now Zara Clark Museum), 1986

- Location within Queensland Location within Australia
- 20.0738°S 146.2575°E
- Location: Mosman Street, Charters Towers City, Charters Towers, Charters Towers Region, Queensland, Australia

History
- Design period: 1870s–1890s (late 19th century)
- Built: c. 1891–1940s

Queensland Heritage Register
- Official name: Bartlam's Store (former), Burns Philp & Company Limited, Wright Heaton & Company, Zara Clark Museum
- Type: state heritage (built)
- Designated: 21 October 1992
- Reference no.: 600409
- Significant period: 1890s, 1901, 1940s (fabric) c. 1891–1940s, 1940s–1976 (historical)
- Significant components: loading bay/dock

Bartlam's Store is a heritage-listed former pair of shops and now museum at Mosman Street, Charters Towers City, Charters Towers, Charters Towers Region, Queensland, Australia. It was built from c. 1891 to 1940s. It is also known as Burns Philp & Company Limited and Wright Heaton & Company. It was acquired by the National Trust in 1978, and the Zara Clark Museum was subsequently established in the building. It was added to the Queensland Heritage Register on 21 October 1992.

== History ==
The former Bartlams store consists of two single-storey brick buildings which have been converted for a single occupancy. They formed part of an important commercial and retail area in Charters Towers in the late 19th century

Discovered in late 1871, Charters Towers became the richest of the North Queensland mining fields. It was proclaimed a municipality in 1877 and the construction of the Great Northern railway created easy access to the port at Townsville, solving the problem of high freight costs experienced by many other mining fields. Charters Towers gold was in deep reefs and the equipment needed to extract and process it was financed by substantial southern and overseas investment. The town became a prosperous centre providing employment for a considerable number of people. It had several schools, 8 churches, 3 newspapers, 2 iron foundries, a hospital, fire brigade, jockey club and gasworks. In the late 1880s and 1890s, handsome public buildings rose to replace the modest structures of the early township. Gold output peaked in 1899, as did a population of 26,500.

The land on which both buildings stand was sold at auction in 1882 as 3 allotments. The corner block, allotment 1, was purchased by William Jackson, who died in 1886 and left the property to be administered by Trustees. In 1898 it was sold to Wright Heaton and Company Limited. They were a large firm of carriers, forwarding agents and produce merchants, formed in New South Wales, who had arrived in Charters Towers in 1882 following the opening of the rail link with Townsville. They initially had premises at the Charters Towers railway station and in 1884 opened a forage store on the corner of Gill and Deane Streets. They are believed to have operated from this site for some years before actually purchasing the property. This building was constructed for them in 1901. In 1907 they leased it to Cummins and Campbell, who initially conducted a similar business, but branched out and by 1916 were describing themselves as wine, spirit and general merchants. After being sold in 1912 to Horace Brown it was purchased in 1916 by William White who opened there the following year as William White & Co. Ltd., also a merchant. In 1925 it was purchased by Bartlam's Limited, general merchants, who supplied stations in Western Queensland.

The adjoining building was built as a branch of the important trading company of Burns, Philp and Company Limited. James Burns had arrived in Brisbane in 1862 with his brother John, who set up a store there, while James worked on a pastoral run. In 1867, James set up a store in Gympie, beginning a long association with mining fields. In 1872 he moved to Townsville and set up his own business there. He was joined in 1874 by Robert Philp who had previously worked for shipping agents in Brisbane. Burns moved to Sydney in 1877 and established himself as an importer and shipping agent, while Philp continued business in the north. In 1883 they formed a company, Burns Philp and Company Limited, registered in Sydney. Within a decade of Burns's arrival in Townsville, the company dominated trade in North Queensland, supplying a huge range of goods. They also became a major player in Pacific and New Guinea trading.

In Charters Towers, Philp entered into a business arrangement with Isidor Lissner, who was elected to the Queensland Legislative Assembly in 1883. Lissner was not considered a good business man by Burns and the Charters Towers branch actually made a substantial loss in the years 1883–1886, apparently due to previous injudicious purchasing. Philp continued to represent the northern interests of the company even after he himself was elected to the Legislative Assembly in 1886. Lissner owned Allotment 3 of section 27 in Mosman Street and subdivided it in 1887. Philp acquired subdivision B and purchased Allotment 2 from Martin Thomsen, the original grantee. At the time, the premises of Burns Philp & Co were further along Mosman Street. The company developed rapidly during the boom of the 1880s, although 1888–89 was a difficult time for Charters Towers as drought affected the running of crushing mills which used considerable quantities of water.

In 1891 the property was transferred into the name of Burns Philp and Company Limited and a new building, designed by architects Eyre and Munro, was constructed for the company at a cost of £3500. Part of the building was offices and part a store. It was a substantial building with an elaborate facade in keeping with other commercial buildings being erected in Charters Towers and with its neighbour, Wright Heaton and Company.

Although gold production on the field peaked in 1899 at 337,000 ounces (9,600,000 g), it soon became clear that these grades did not continue at depth and by 1920 only one mine was still operational. People, businesses and even the more portable buildings moved away from the town. The store was sold to Selina Vicks in 1921. Her husband, Thomas Vicks, conducted a grocery store from the premises. From 1926 Burns Philp also had an agency there, eventually moving from the site around 1940 when they obtained premises in Stubley Street. Vicks grocery store closed about the same time and the property was sold in 1944 to Bartlams, who may have been occupying the building before this, though there is no formal lease.

Bartlams modified the buildings into a single occupancy. They went into liquidation in 1976 and in 1978 the building was offered for sale. There was concern about the possibility of demolition and in order to prevent this, the building was purchased by the National Trust of Queensland with a bequest from Miss Zara Clark of "Mirtna" Station. The "Zara Clark Museum" began as a transport museum and houses a large local history collection which includes horse-drawn vehicles, agricultural machinery, domestic, mining, and medical artefacts, records and photographs.

When the Bartlams store buildings were erected, Mosman Street was dominated by commercial and retail buildings extending from Mary Street at the north to Towers Street at the south. Many of these buildings have since been demolished, and houses now occupy some of the sites on which larger buildings once stood. Bartlam's store forms the edge of this once continuous row of buildings, and is now important in maintaining some sense of the scale of Mosman Street as a former commercial district.

== Description ==
The former Bartlams store in Charters Towers comprises two single-storeyed brick and stucco buildings of similar scale and design at the corner of Mosman and Mary Streets.

The buildings are similar in size, shape and design. Each has a decorative parapet concealing a gable roof clad with corrugated iron. A street awning supported by cast iron posts extends along the Mosman Street facade and around the corner of Mary Street, although part of the Mary Street elevation is plain and has no awning. Both buildings have a high level storage area inside with delivery doors to the rear which opens into a yard with a loading platform.

The former Wright Heaton office on the corner of Mosman and Mary Streets has a corner entrance and sash windows along both streets, suggesting that it was originally designed as offices rather than a store. The former Burns Philp building facing Mosman Street comprises two sections: a shop adjoining the corner building, and an adjacent office - each with its own entrance. The portion of the second building that appears to have been offices contains partitions and doors which are of the same period as the building and are probably original.

The exterior is largely intact, although the frame and glass of the shop front window has been replaced and the entrance to the "shop" is now through a glass door. The parapet above the shop front is supported by free-standing columns with the shop window set in behind. The base of the shop front below the window is in cast iron in an unusual fretwork pattern.

== Heritage listing ==
The former Bartlam's Store was listed on the Queensland Heritage Register on 21 October 1992 having satisfied the following criteria.

The place is important in demonstrating the evolution or pattern of Queensland's history.

Charters Towers, as an extraordinarily rich goldfield, made a major contribution to the economy of Queensland and to the development of the North. The former Bartlams store has housed several companies supplying essential goods and services to the pastoral and mining industries and who therefore contributed to this development. The elaborate facades reflect the importance of their Charters Towers branch to such companies and the affluence and confidence of the goldfield in the late 19th century.

The place is important in demonstrating the principal characteristics of a particular class of cultural places.

The former Bartlams store is a good example of late Victorian commercial buildings which combine office and retail functions with practical loading facilities, thereby demonstrating the way in which their business was carried out.

The place is important because of its aesthetic significance.

The building makes an important visual contribution to Mosman Street and indicates the extent and significance of this business area when Charters Towers was at its most prosperous.

The place has a special association with the life or work of a particular person, group or organisation of importance in Queensland's history.

The building is associated with the important mercantile entity of Burns Philp and Company Limited as a purpose built branch in an important regional centre, and with the firms of Wright Heaton, Bartlams and others who were an essential component in the development of Queensland.
