= Pfeiffer House, Charters Towers =

Pfeiffer House
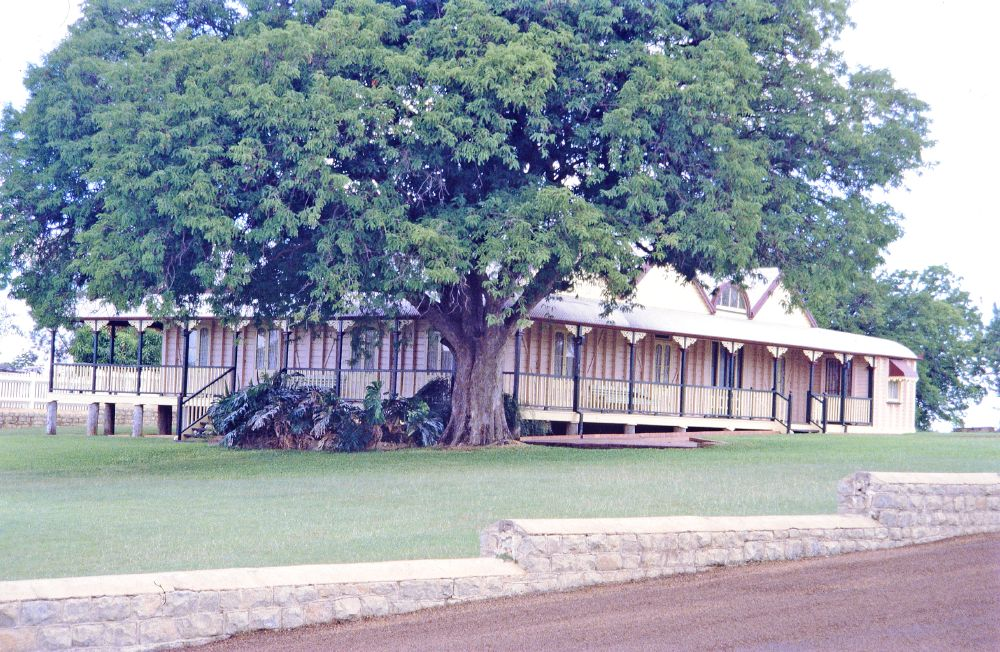
- Pfeiffer House, 2001

- Location within Queensland Location within Australia
- 20.0828°S 146.257°E
- Location: 2–6 Paull Street, Charters Towers City, Charters Towers, Charters Towers Region, Queensland, Australia

History
- Design period: 1870s–1890s (late 19th century)
- Built: c. 1881

Queensland Heritage Register
- Official name: Pfeiffer House (former), Church of Jesus Christ of Latter Day Saints, Day Dawn House
- Type: state heritage (built)
- Designated: 21 October 1992
- Reference no.: 600410
- Significant period: 1880s (fabric); 1880s–1900s (historical)
- Significant components: residential accommodation – main house

Pfeiffer House is a heritage-listed detached house at 2–6 Paull Street, Charters Towers City, Charters Towers, Charters Towers Region, Queensland, Australia. It was built c. 1881. It is also known as Church of Jesus Christ of Latter Day Saints and Day Dawn House. It was added to the Queensland Heritage Register on 21 October 1992.

== History ==
The building currently the Church of Jesus Christ of Latter Day Saints was constructed as a private residence by Charters Towers mining magnate Frederick Pfeiffer in c. 1881 close to his gold mine.

Discovered in late 1871, Charters Towers became the richest of the North Queensland mining fields. It was proclaimed a municipality in 1877 and the construction of the Great Northern railway created easy access to the port at Townsville, solving the problem of high freight costs experienced by many other mining fields. Charters Towers gold was in deep reefs and the equipment needed to extract and process it was financed by substantial southern and overseas investment. The town became a prosperous centre providing employment for a considerable number of people. In the late 1880s and 1890s, handsome public buildings rose to replace the modest structures of the early township.

Friedrich (Frederick) Pfeiffer, a German immigrant, first visited Australia in 1851 as an apprentice on a cargo ship. In 1856 he abandoned seafaring at Melbourne and set out for the Victorian gold fields. After eighteen years of mining in Victoria, New South Wales and New Zealand, Pfeiffer moved to Charters Towers in 1874. In 1878, Pfeiffer and other members of the Day Dawn mining syndicate struck a reef of high grade ore. It was the first consistently large gold producer on the Charters Towers field. By 1903, when Pfeiffer died, the Day Dawn had produced £1,200,000 worth of gold. Becoming a limited company in 1887, it was sold to English interests, making Pfeiffer a very rich man who was to continue major interests in other mines.

When Pfeiffer first arrived in Charters Towers he set up a tent on what was to become known as the Day Dawn Ridge, close to the entrance to his mine. He built his house on the same site and it was probably completed in time for this marriage to Mary Donovan on 1 February 1882. This possibility is supported by the fact that a manager's house was built for his company to a design by J Longden in October 1881 and Pfeiffer's house appears on a survey plan of 12 December 1882. Longden worked as a mining engineer and architect in Charters Towers between and 1879 and 1882 and designed the first St Columba's Church. It is possible that he also designed Pfeiffer's house.

The house, built using an exposed frame timber construction technique, is thought to be the oldest house of this type in Charters Towers and one of the oldest in North Queensland. The house has been both reduced and added to during its life, although it may have been built a single row of rooms surrounded by verandahs. Despite the simplicity of its early design, the house was the grandest private residence in Charters Towers when built, something easily forgotten when far more ostentatious houses were built during the boom years of the 1890s and which, at the time of Pfeiffer's death, was considered "unpretending" for a man of his position. Its placement near the mine suggests that ready access to it was considered more important than any inconvenience caused by noise or dust.

Pfeiffer, as was the case with other major mine owners or investors, became a prominent figure in Charters Towers society. He served as chairman of the hospital board for fifteen years, was a founder and benefactor of the Lutheran church, honorary Major of the Kennedy Regiment and was well known for his generosity towards community organisations and those in need. When he died in 1903 flags flew at half mast in the town. The Stock Exchange suspended its mid day call as a mark of respect on the day of the funeral, which many of the leading mining and business figures in Charters Towers attended.

In order for his executors to wind up his affairs, a miner's homestead lease covering the site of the house was applied for and granted in 1915 as MHL 8206. At the time improvements to this site consisted of a "large house, store room, stables, coach house, men's quarters, office etc." valued at £8000. The gold output of the field peaked in 1899; however, it soon became clear that these grades did not continue at depth and by 1920 only one mine was still operational. People, businesses and even the more portable buildings, moved away from the town. In 1923 the house was sold at auction for only £950, a reflection of sharply reduced property values following the decline of the field. Over the years it changed hands a number of times and was also leased. The lease granted to John Ratten in 1937 details the extent of the house which had 4 bedrooms, sitting, dining and breakfast rooms, a kitchen, back and front verandahs and a wash house.

The house was purchased by the Church of Jesus Christ of Latter Day Saints in 1981. By this time it was in poor condition and demolition was proposed to make way for a new church building. However considerable community support for the retention of the house was raised by newspaper articles on its history and the Church decided to retain and repair the building, adapting it for church use. There was considerable local input during this project which won a National Trust award. The building was dedicated as a church on 24 April 1983. In 1994 the Church received a Deed of Grant which replaced the Miner's Homestead Lease for the property.

== Description ==
The former Pfeiffer house stands on Day Dawn Ridge on gently sloping land and is a single storey timber building, L-shaped in plan, with an exposed stud frame. It is encircled by verandahs and is on low stumps, being raised slightly on the northern side. The roof is of an unusual form, having 3 parallel gables with a barrel vaulted hall placed between them, all roofed in corrugated iron. The verandahs have a convex corrugated iron awning supported by timber posts with fretwork brackets and square section timber balustrades. The south west verandah has been built in and has a brick chimney.

The entrance is reached by concrete steps and a cedar door with sidelights gives on to a hallway with a barrel vaulted ceiling with end panels of coloured glass. The re-use of the building for church purposes has caused very little change to the layout of the rooms. The former dining room to the right of the hall is a classroom area and a kitchen with a chimney. To the left of the entrance hall are two large linked rooms, formerly a drawing room and now used as a chapel. Towards the rear is a meeting room. At the rear, the verandah and a toilet block frame a courtyard area which contains a baptismal font.

== Heritage listing ==
The former Pfeiffer House was listed on the Queensland Heritage Register on 21 October 1992 having satisfied the following criteria.

The place is important in demonstrating the evolution or pattern of Queensland's history.

Charters Towers, as an extraordinarily rich goldfield, made a major contribution to the economy of Queensland and to the development of the North in the late 19th century. The former Pfeiffer house, a substantial residence built for a wealthy mine owner within a decade of the proclamation of the field, demonstrates this success. It is also an illustration of the wealth of Charters Towers that this house was thought of as comparatively modest by the time of Pfeiffer's death in 1903. It marks the site of the Day Dawn mine, a very important one in the city's history.

The place demonstrates rare, uncommon or endangered aspects of Queensland's cultural heritage.

The former Pfeiffer house is unusual in form and is a rare early example of exposed stud construction in North Queensland.

The place is important because of its aesthetic significance.

It has aesthetic value as a residence of competent design and detail which is generally well liked by the community. That this is so is evidenced by the public concern for its preservation voiced when it demolition was proposed in the 1980s.

The place has a special association with the life or work of a particular person, group or organisation of importance in Queensland's history.

It has a close association with the life and work of Frederick Pfeiffer, not only a major figure in the mining industry in Charters Towers, but a public spirited man who was highly regarded in the community. The house was near the entrance to his mine, an illustration of Pfeiffer's practical attitude to his life as a working miner, as well as mine owner.
