= National Trust of Queensland =

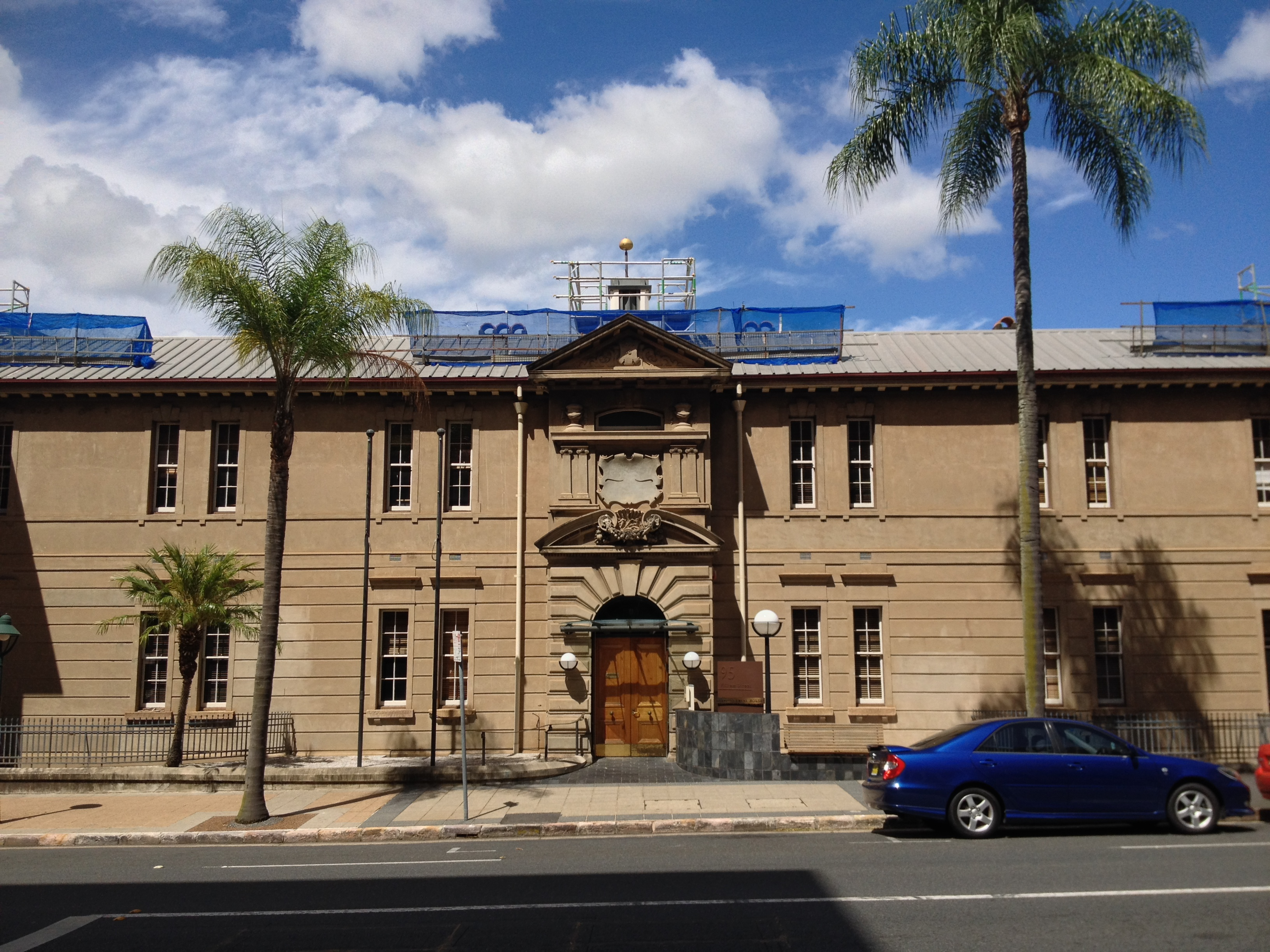
The former National Trust of Queensland headquarters at 95 William Street, Brisbane

National Trust of Queensland is a membership-based community organisation to "promote the natural, Indigenous and cultural heritage" of Queensland. It was founded in 1963.

It is a member of the National Trust of Australia, which federates the eight autonomous National Trusts in each Australian state and territory.

The National Trust of Queensland is headquartered at Currumbin Wildlife Sanctuary, 28 Tomewin Street, Currumbin, Queensland on the Gold Coast.

The organisation conducts the National Trust of Queensland Heritage awards which were previously known as the John Herbert Memorial Awards. The premier award is called the John Herbert Memorial Award in honour of a former president.

== Heritage register ==
The Heritage Register of the National Trust of Queensland contains buildings, precincts, natural environment places or culturally significant artefacts of Queensland. Items on the Heritage Register are not protected by law.

== Properties ==
The Trust owns several properties on the register.

- Brennan & Geraghtys Store, Maryborough
- Currumbin Wildlife Sanctuary, Gold Coast
- Hou Wang Temple, Atherton
- Cooktown Museum (formerly James Cook Historical Museum), Cooktown
- National Trust Heritage Centre, Townsville
- Royal Bull's Head Inn, Drayton (Toowoomba)
- Stock Exchange Arcade, Charters Towers
- Wolston House at Wacol - the first to be acquired
- Zara Clark Museum (Charters Towers Museum), Charters Towers

== See also ==
- Queensland Heritage Council
- Queensland Heritage Register
- Royal Historical Society of Queensland
- List of National Trust properties in Australia
