= Queenton, Queensland =

Queenton
- Suburb
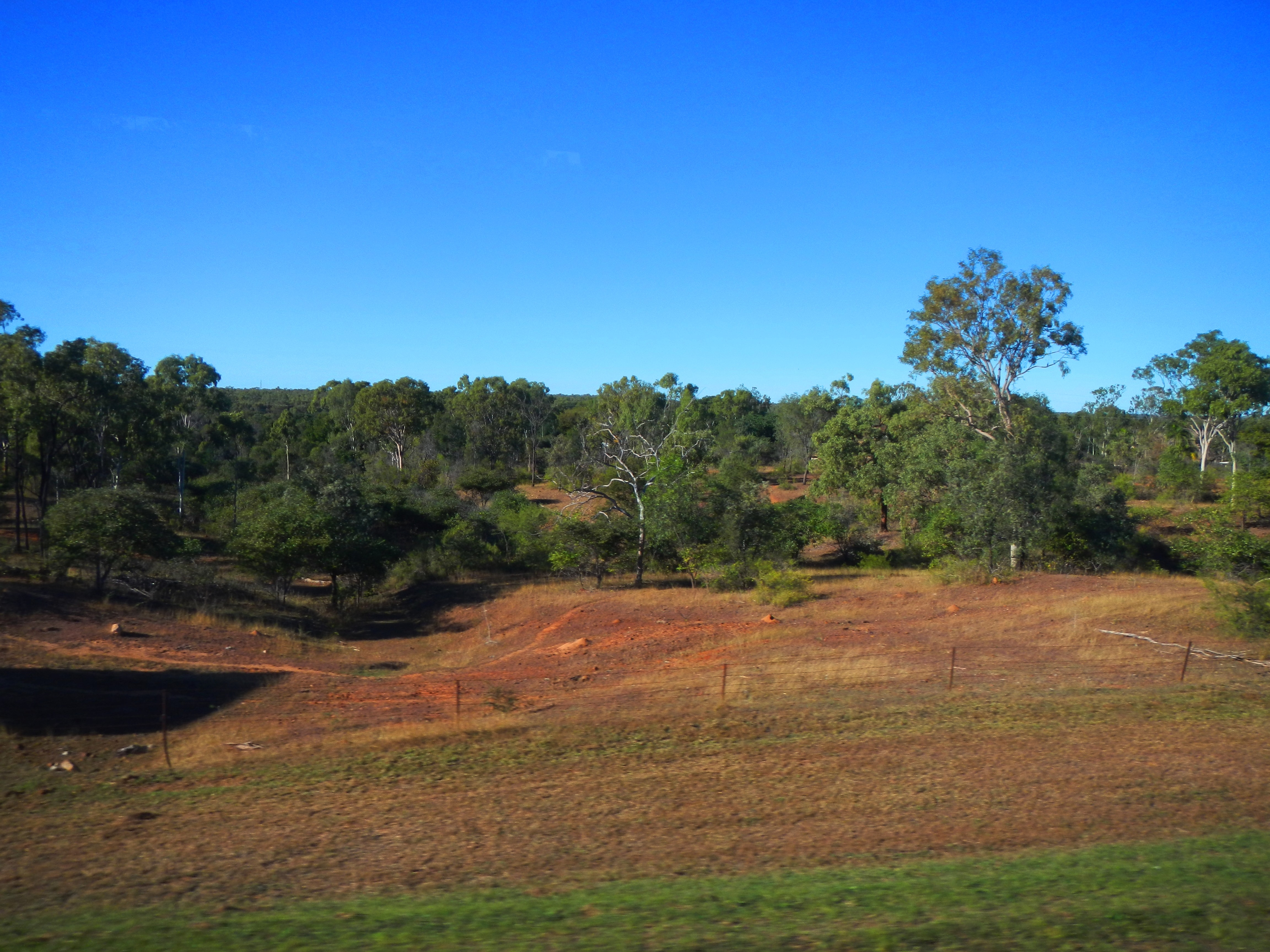
- Bushland, Queenton, 2013

- Interactive map of Queenton
- Coordinates: 20.0761°S 146.2813°E
- Country: Australia
- State: Queensland
- City: Charters Towers
- LGA: Charters Towers Region
- Location: 1.3 km (0.81 mi) E of Charters Towers CBD; 135 km (84 mi) SW of Townsville; 1,311 km (815 mi) NNW of Brisbane

Government
  - State electorate: Traeger
  - Federal division: Kennedy

Area
  - Total: 5.4 km^{2} (2.1 sq mi)

Population
  - Total: 1,236 (2021 census)
  - Density: 228.9/km^{2} (593/sq mi)
- Time zone: UTC+10:00 (AEST)
- Postcode: 4820
Suburbs around Queenton
Charters Towers City	Richmond Hill	Columbia
Towers Hill	Queenton	Broughton
Mosman Park	Millchester	Broughton

Queenton is an eastern suburb of Charters Towers in the Charters Towers Region, Queensland, Australia. In the 2021 census, Queenton had a population of 1,236 people.

== Geography ==
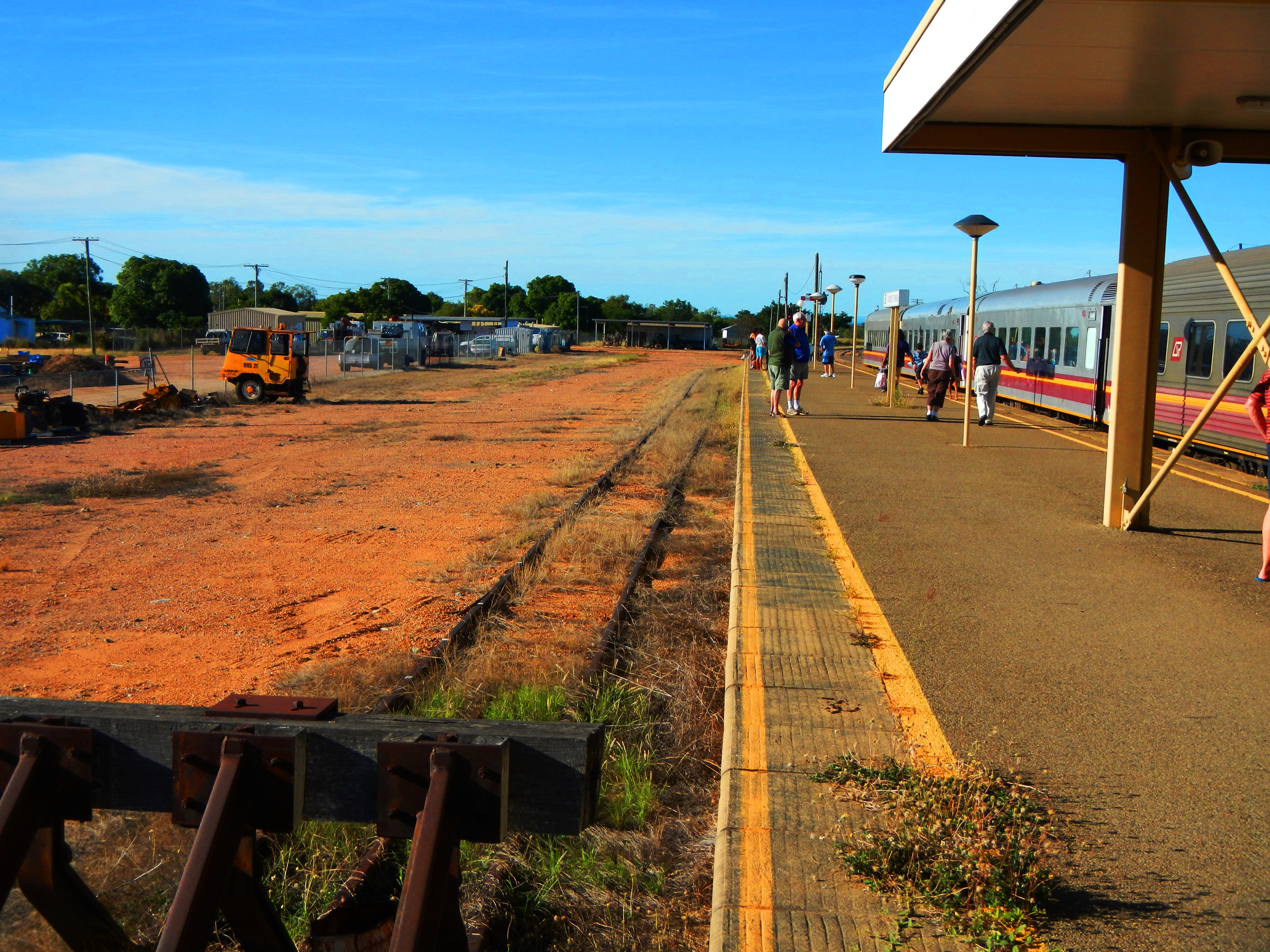
Charters Towers railway station, 2013

The Great Northern railway passes through Queenton from the north-east to the south-west with Charters Towers railway station, also known as the Queenton railway station, (20.0772°S 146.2709°E) within the locality. The railway line forms both part of the locality's north-eastern boundary and also part of its western boundary. The Flinders Highway forms a part of the locality's eastern boundary.

The land is predominantly flat (approximately 300 metres above sea level), partly residential, partly old mine ruins, and partly undeveloped bushland.

== History ==
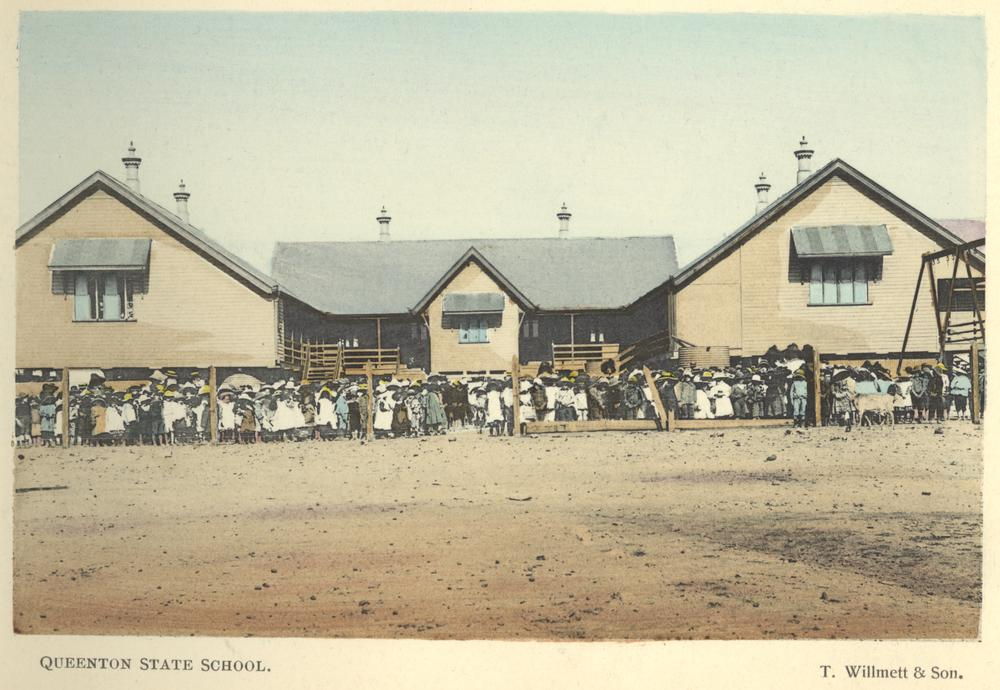
Queenton State School, 1904

Over 5,000 people were buried in the Pioneer Cemetery from 1872 to 1895.

Queenton State School opened on 13 July 1891 and closed on 1 September 1931.

Charters Towers Mental Hospital (also known as Mosman Hall Special Hospital) opened on 1 July 1954 with the first patients admitted on 16 September 1954, having been transferred from the Brisbane Mental Hospital and Toowoomba Mental Hospital. The facility was named after Hugh Mosman, who found gold at Charters Towers.It was operated by the Queensland Government at 35 Gladstone Road (20.0768°S 146.2807°E). The hospital closed circa 2001. It was replaced on the site by a new mental health facility, the Charters Towers Rehabilitation Unit, at the front of the site and the Kernow master-planned residential community and hotel at the rear of the site.

Tors Drive-In Cinema opened in 1966.

On 3 August 2012, a part of Queenton was excised and made part of the new suburb of Charters Towers City.

== Demographics ==
In the 2011 census, Queenton had a population of 1,702 people.

In the 2016 census, Queenton had a population of 1,285 people.

In the 2021 census, Queenton had a population of 1,236 people.

== Heritage listings ==
Queenton has a number of heritage-listed sites, including:

- Signals, Crane and Subway, Charters Towers Railway Station, Enterprise Road
- Charters Towers mine shafts
- Stone kerbing, channels and footbridges of Charters Towers

== Education ==
There are no schools in Queenton. The nearest government primary schools are Millchester State School in neighbouring Millchester to the south, Charters Tower Central State School in neighbouring Charters Towers City to the west, and Richmond Hill State School in neighbouring Richmond Hill to the north. The nearest government secondary school is Charters Towers State High School in Charters Towers City.

== Amenities ==
Charters Towers Indoor Sports Centre is at 11-17 New Queen Road (20.0726°S 146.2733°E). It provides a variety of sports in an indoor setting including netball, cricket, volleyball and soccer.

Charters Towers Tors Drive-in Cinema is an outdoor movie theatre at 110-120 New Queen Road (20.0650°S 146.2907°E). It is the oldest continuously-operating drive-in theatre in Queensland.

== Facilities ==
Charters Towers Rehabilitation Unit is a residential facility for people with complex mental health needs at 35 Gladstone Road (20.0764°S 146.2808°E).

Charters Towers Pioneer Cemetery is on a block bounded by North, South, East and West Streets (20.0856°S 146.2697°E).
