= Aldborough, Charters Towers =

Aldborough
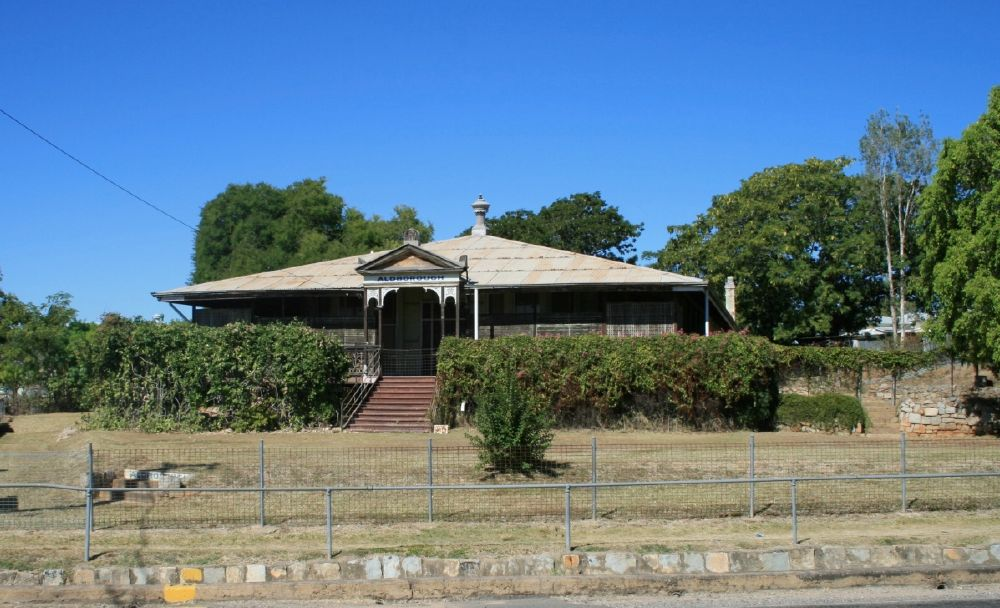
- Aldborough, 2006

- Location within Queensland Location within Australia
- 20.0778°S 146.2585°E
- Location: 25 Deane Street, Charters Towers City, Charters Towers, Charters Towers Region, Queensland, Australia

History
- Design period: 1900–1914 (early 20th century)
- Built: 1900

Site notes
- Architect: William Henry Allan Munro

Queensland Heritage Register
- Official name: Aldborough
- Type: state heritage (built)
- Designated: 14 August 2008
- Reference no.: 602668
- Significant period: 1900
- Significant components: fernery, shed/s, store/s / storeroom / storehouse
- Builders: Thomas Barry O'Meara

Aldborough is a heritage-listed villa at 25 Deane Street, Charters Towers City, Charters Towers, Charters Towers Region, Queensland, Australia. It was designed by William Henry Allan Munro and built in 1900 by Thomas Barry O'Meara. It was added to the Queensland Heritage Register on 14 August 2008.

== History ==
Aldborough, a large timber residence at the corner of Deane and Hodgkinson streets, one block south of the main business street of Charters Towers, was built in 1896 for the successful draper and merchant Alfred Edwin Daking-Smith. The house is a well-known landmark in the town. Aldborough demonstrates characteristics typical of housing in Charters Towers, and is a good example of a house built for a successful Charters Towers businessman. Between 1872 and 1917 Charters Towers was one of the most important goldfields in Queensland. At its peak in 1899 it accounted for more than a third of Queensland's entire gold production, and by 1901 it was Queensland's second largest town.

Gold was discovered at the foot of Towers Hill in December 1871, the find was reported to Warden WFCM Charters at Ravenswood in January 1872, and the Charters Towers Goldfield was proclaimed on 31 August 1872. Charters Towers was proclaimed a municipality on 21 June 1877, and the town embraced 1 square mile (2.6 km^{2}), centred on the intersection of Gill Street and Mosman Street. The gold was found in reefs of gold-bearing ore, and as the mines deepened the smaller mining operations were replaced by larger companies. A heightened phase of prosperity was entered after the great wealth of the Day Dawn reef was discovered in 1878. The completion of the Great Northern railway from Townsville to Charters Towers in December 1882 also boosted the town's prosperity, by lowering the cost of supplies and building materials.

Charters Towers boomed throughout the 1880s, overshadowing all other mining centres in North Queensland. A display of Charters Towers Gold in the Queensland Court at the Colonial and Indian Exhibition in London in 1886 in turn led to an influx of capital from English speculators, and in 1889 the famous Brilliant Reef, the richest on the field, was discovered. During this time many of the 1870s timber commercial buildings on Mosman and Gill Streets were rebuilt in brick. Charters Towers continued to prosper throughout the depressed economy of the 1890s with a peak production of 319,572 ounces (9,059,700 g) of gold in 1899, and a population of around 26,500 the same year. At the turn of the century Charters Towers, with its multi-cultural population, was known colloquially as "the World".

After 1899 there was a steady decline in gold production. In 1912 the Warden reported that the extreme depth for profitable mining had been reached, and most mines had been abandoned by 1916. The last of the big mines, the Brilliant Extended, closed in 1917, but small mining operations continued to be serviced by the Venus battery, which was owned by the Queensland Government from 1919. By 1921 Charters Towers' population had decreased to 5,682, and many timber buildings were moved to Townsville after World War I. Some villas were reused as schools as Charters Towers adapted to becoming an educational centre for North Queensland.

When Daking-Smith arrived in Charters Towers in 1891 the town was still booming. Born in 1866, he had lived with his grandmother at Aldeburgh on the coast of Suffolk, England, after the deaths of his parents. At the age of 21 Alfred Daking-Smith decided to seek a new life in Australia, and he arrived in Melbourne in 1887, before moving to Brisbane. He was employed by the drapery firm Overell and White as a departmental manager in Brisbane, and he later opened and managed a branch for the firm in Laidley. In 1891 Daking-Smith moved to Charters Towers in North Queensland and established himself as a draper in his own right in "humble premises" in Mosman Street. He moved into larger premises on the corner of Gill and Mosman around 1895. This building was described in 1898 as a two-storeyed warehouse with prominent window displays with a staff of thirty-five working in eight departments.

Daking-Smith built his home Aldborough, named in honour of his years with his grandmother, close to the main business street of the town. In June 1896 three allotments at the south east corner of Deane and Hodgkinson streets were transferred from Louis Hamann to Daking-Smith.

On 21 October 1896 The North Queensland Register reported that Daking-Smith's new residence, one of the finest in the town, was approaching completion. The position of the building, facing the corner, was apparently designed to secure an expansive outlook, while increasing privacy. The building's style, the bungalow, was seen as the most suitable for the local climate, and features mentioned at the time included: a handsome flight of front steps; a spacious verandah with cast iron railings; glass front and rear doors, both with sidelights; an arch in the hallway and one between the dining and drawing rooms; cedar cornices and an embossed stamped paper frieze in the dining and drawing rooms; two floor-to-ceiling bay windows to the front verandah; varnished interior woodwork; three large bedrooms in the main building; ventilation tubing from the ornamental panels in each ceiling, with an iron ventilator on the roof; and bedrooms on either side of the latticed back verandah, separated from the main building. There was also a separate pantry, on piles set in vessels of water, off the rear verandah; and the kitchen wing included the kitchen, a bathroom and three bedrooms (counting the bedroom on the south end of the rear verandah). The contractor for the residence was TB O'Meara, the architect was WHA Munro, and the plumber was Charles Fraser.

Part of the site was fenced off for a stable (three stalls with stone floor, carriage shed, harness and feed room) and a bulk store, the latter being a two-storey building measuring 40 by 20 feet (12.2 by 6.1 m). This store fronted Deane Street, and was later retained by Daking-Smith when he sold Aldborough.

The Queensland Post Office Directory (QPOD) first lists Daking-Smith as living on the site in 1900. In 1901 the Charters Towers City Council Valuation Register listed Alfred Daking-Smith, draper, as occupying allotments one, two and three of section eleven with a capital value of £600. Initially he is listed in the postal directories on Deane Street, and then from 1906 he is listed on Hodgkinson Street.

Aldborough is aligned to the northwest, facing the corner, which is also roughly in the direction of the intersection of Gill and Mosman streets, where Daking-Smith had opened his 1895 shop. The most common houses in Charters Towers were two or four-room timber cottages, and in plan Aldborough is an expanded version of these simple buildings, many of which were prefabricated to standardised plans. Aldborough's style and fabric, including the light timber stud frame, reflect construction techniques common in Charters Towers. In a technique well-suited to the climate of North Queensland, the walls of houses in Charters Towers were lined with horizontal boards, and the timber frame was left exposed externally. From c. 1900 vertical boards were more likely to be used.

Aldborough shares other features in common with Charters Towers housing, such as sheet metal acroterions on the corners of its guttering; a sheet metal ventilator at the crown of its roof; and shades and screens around its verandahs to reduce the effect of the hot climate - such as latticework, timber louvres, canvas blinds and drop-down timber blinds. Aldborough's extended verandah eaves are also characteristic of Charters Towers housing.

In 1906 Alfred Daking-Smith married Beryl Maud Hooke, and the couple soon moved to Sydney, where Daking-Smith attained even greater wealth. He built the mansion Berith Park at Wahroonga, North Sydney in 1909. That same year Daking-Smith erected the Daking-Smith Building as a purpose built department store in upper Gill Street, Charters Towers. Although Charters Towers already had a number of drapery stores, Daking-Smith believed that a more modern, "genteel" shop was needed. Between 1860 and 1920, with the industrialised world's rising level of affluence and leisure time, the "art of shopping", once the prerogative of the wives of the wealthy, was adopted eagerly by the wives of the emerging middle classes. The impressive architectural style of the brick Daking-Smith building was unique for a remote North Queensland town. From his new building Daking-Smith advertised himself as a draper, furnisher and boot merchant. Through this business activity, he made an important contribution to the commercial development of Charters Towers.

In 1913 Daking-Smith built the office block Daking House in Sydney. He also purchased, rebuilt and re-equipped the old Parramatta Woollen Mills in 1913, under the name of the Sydney Woollen Mills. He became a director of the Automatic Breadbaking Co. of Sydney, and The Jungle Ltd of Innes Springs. His mining investments and interests were extensive as were his active memberships of many public institutions. By now Alfred's preferred name was Dakingsmith. He lived for some time after 1923 at the Astor, Sydney's first co-operatively owned residential flats, but he retired to his country home Beraldor in Bowral. He died in Sydney on 7 August 1943 aged seventy-seven years.

Although living in New South Wales from 1909, Dakingsmith maintained his business in Charters Towers, and he returned on regular visits for some years. He was an unsuccessful National candidate for the seat of Queenton in the Queensland state elections of March 1918. From 1909 Dakingsmith rented out Aldborough before it was sold in 1919 to a medical practitioner, Thomas Roy Edmeades, on a reduced parcel of land.

At the time of the 1919 sale allotments one and two were resurveyed into subdivisions one and two. Dakingsmith retained subdivision two (20.6 perches (520 m^{2}) just southwest of Aldborough, facing Deane Street) while Edmeades took possession of the land on which Aldborough stood, subdivision one of allotments one and two (1 rood 20.4 perches (1,530 m^{2})) and allotment three (1 rood (11,000 sq ft; 1,000 m^{2})). Dakingsmith continued to operate his store on subdivision two, and "D Smith and Co. Stores" is listed at this location in the postal directories from 1912 to 1923 inclusive.

Dr Edmeades used Aldborough as a surgery and residence, the bedroom at the corner of the north-east and south-east verandahs reputedly serving as his waiting room. Edmeades became a highly respected and long serving medical practitioner to the people of Charters Towers. The park beside City Hall in Mosman Street is named in his honour.

In October 1922 Aldborough was transferred to Jessie Mary Beach, from Muttaburra. Jessie's husband had drawn a selection at Julia Creek in a land ballot, but Jessie lived in Aldborough so that their three children could be schooled in Charters Towers. Jessie died in September 1954, but the property remained in the Beach-Steele family until auctioned in 2008. Local interest in the fate of this landmark building attracted 300 people to the auction, and the sale made the front page of The Northern Miner.

Sometime in the 1920s or the 1930s the main section of the house was painted internally, with stencilled patterns over the base colours. Accounts differ as to whether it was painted during the ownership of Edmeades, or the Beaches. As the paint was applied over the varnished timber walls and ceilings of the hallway, living room and dining room, it soon cracked into a crazed pattern, which remains a feature of Aldborough's interior to this day. In the bedrooms, which did not have varnished walls, the stencilled designs are more intact. The house was also reputedly the first in Charters Towers to have electric lighting, run by a 32 volt generator under the house.

When Dakingsmith wound up Daking-Smith & Co. in 1925 his property and store in Deane Street, adjacent to Aldborough, was transferred to bakers Herbert Powell Jones and William John Lang in January 1926. After their business folded the land was sold to Jessie Beach in 1947.

== Description ==
Aldborough occupies two allotments at the intersection of Deane and Hodgkinson Streets, within the original C of the town of Charters Towers.

Aldborough is set back from the corner of Deane and Hodgkinson Streets, and faces north-west towards the intersection and a small entrance gate at the corner. The ground rises to a terrace between the road frontage and the house. There is no definable entrance path although there is a small set of concrete steps up to the terrace. The main house entrance comprises a set of wide stairs with steel railings (not original) and a projecting gabled porch, which has metal acroterions and a decorative finial at its apex. The porch has a decorative pediment with a name board below, and is supported by double timber columns with decorative timber brackets.

The ground to the south-west of the house steps up via two stone retaining walls, and there is also a derelict chicken shed on the southern boundary of the property, with the remains of a possible pond circled by stones nearby. At the rear of the main house, in the angle formed by the kitchen wing, there is a fernery made of rough bush timber framing, covered over the top with wire mesh. There are also two corrugated iron rainwater tanks at the rear of the house, and two corrugated iron sheds along the rear (eastern) edge of the property. Access to the understorey of the house is through a metal gate next to a retaining wall beside the north-east elevation of the house. Access from the road is via a bridge at the north-east corner of the property, over the also heritage-listed stone stormwater channel along Hodgkinson Street.

Aldborough is a large, single-storeyed timber villa that is lowset on a mix of thick timber stumps and round steel stumps. There is a corrugated iron generator shed under the house, with a concrete mount in situ. Aldborough has a corrugated iron pyramid roof with some surviving metal acroterions and a large roof ventilator. The roof extends to cover the verandahs on all four sides. The exterior walls of the main house are single-skinned, with vertical timber boards and exposed timber studs to the verandahs. The hip-roofed, semi-detached kitchen wing, located at the southern end of the south-east verandah of the main house, is clad with horizontal timber boards, with the timber studs exposed inside the rooms, except for the walls along the wing's verandah, which extends south-east from the south-east (rear) verandah of the main house. These walls have the studs exposed to the verandah. The same construction occurs in the former bedroom built at the corner of the north-east and south-east verandahs of the main house.

There are decorative iron balustrades with timber railing on the north-west verandah, with a mix of timber latticework and timber-slat blinds above, while the north-east verandah has the same balustrading with timber-slat blinds above. There is also a timber partition with a door towards the eastern end of the north-east verandah, and a small timber toilet room. The south-west verandah has balustrading, but only a small section of lattice and no timber blinds. The south-east verandah has no balustrading and is screened by timber latticework. The narrow verandah that runs along the north-east elevation of the kitchen wing past the bedrooms and bathroom to the kitchen, has timber balustrading, and a lattice partition and door towards the north-west end. Hedged plants grow to the height of the top balustrading rail in front of the north-west, north-east and south-west verandahs of Aldborough. They are supported by a double galvanised steel pipe frame that is attached to the side of the house.

A central hallway is entered by means of a large door surrounded by sidelights and an opening fan light, and the hall exits through a similar door to the rear verandah. To the north-east of the hall are three bedrooms. The westernmost bedroom is larger than the other two, and has a bay window with three large double-hung windows that can be opened from floor level, overlooking the north-west verandah. This master bedroom also has a set of French doors to the north-east verandah. The centre bedroom also has a bay window set with French doors narrowly protruding onto the north-east verandah, with another set of French doors adjacent to the bay. The easternmost bedroom has sets of French doors to both the north-east and south-east verandahs.

The south-west side of the hallway comprises one large living and dining room, with a middle archway dividing the room into two spaces. Each space has a large ceiling rosette and its own door to the central hallway, and the dining space to the south-east has a set of French doors to the south-east verandah. There is a decorative frieze in both rooms, which appears to be pressed metal. The bay window at the north- west end of the living space has three large double-hung windows, as in the master bedroom. Two sets of French doors provide access to the south-west verandah from the two spaces.

A free-standing pantry/larder is accessed off the south-east verandah of the main house. It is about two metres square, has the same proportioned pyramid roof with metal acroterions and ventilator as the main house, and is reached by stepping over a narrow gap between it and the verandah. The pantry's walls adjacent to the verandah comprise a light fly-screen mesh attached to a timber frame while the outer- facing walls comprise chamferboard topped with fixed louvres. The pantry stands on low concrete stumps which are set inside small concrete water wells, as protection from ants.

The kitchen wing comprises three bedrooms, a bathroom that was remodelled in the 1950s or 1960s, and a large kitchen at the rear. The westernmost bedroom in the kitchen wing has a set of French doors opening onto the east end of the south-west verandah. The kitchen has a large brick fireplace at its south-west end. There is an outside laundry under a skillion roof to the south-east of the kitchen. A built-in copper shares the same brick chimney as the fireplace in the kitchen.

All rooms in the main house have 13 feet 6 inches (4.11 m) high ceilings. There is early linoleum flooring on the floors of all rooms except for the middle bedroom in the main house and the storeroom and bathroom in the kitchen wing. There are a number of original and early fittings in the house, including light switches, decorative metal coat hooks, window catches, rods for opening fanlights above doors, and an electric bell on the wall of the kitchen wing.

== Heritage listing ==
Aldborough was listed on the Queensland Heritage Register on 14 August 2008 having satisfied the following criteria.

The place is important in demonstrating the evolution or pattern of Queensland's history.

The large timber residence Aldborough was constructed in 1896 for Charters Towers businessman and draper Alfred Daking-Smith. Aldborough, in conjunction with the former Daking-Smith Drapery Store in Gill Street, is important in demonstrating the prosperity of Charters Towers at that time. Charters Towers was an extraordinarily rich goldfield which made a major contribution to the economy of Queensland in the late nineteenth and early twentieth centuries, and Aldborough is a product of the wealth generated by a successful retailer in what was then Queensland's second largest town.

The place is important in demonstrating the principal characteristics of a particular class of cultural places.

Aldborough is an example of a large house designed for the North Queensland climate, complete with single-skin timber walls, high ceilings, a central hallway, extended eaves, roof ventilator, and verandah shading in the form of lattice work, timber slat blinds and hedge plantings close to the house. It contains pre-World War II stencilled paintwork, early fittings and early linoleum floor coverings. Its semi-detached kitchen wing, complete with servants' rooms, illustrates the social stratification that existed between the master and servant classes prior to World War I. A freestanding pantry/larder just off the rear verandah demonstrates early means of keeping vermin and insects away from food stores, and the open laundry to the rear of the kitchen contains its copper and fireplace.

The place is important because of its aesthetic significance.

Aldborough stands on a large and highly visible corner block of land close to the main business street of Charters Towers. It is highly intact. Of note are the timber lattices, timber slat blinds and hedge plantings that provide shade in a sub tropical climate. The impressive entrance porch, decorative iron balustrading, roof ventilator, and acroterions also enhance the visual impact of the residence.
