= Aldborough =

Aldborough may refer to:

== Places ==
In Australia

- Aldborough, Charters Towers, a heritage-listed house in Queensland

In Canada

- Aldborough Township, Ontario

In Ireland

- Aldborough House, a building in Dublin, Ireland

In United Kingdom

- Aldborough, Norfolk
- Aldborough, North Yorkshire
  - Aldborough Roman town
  - Aldborough (UK Parliament constituency)
- Aldborough Hatch, in the London Borough of Redbridge
  - Aldborough (ward), in the London Borough of Redbridge
- Aldeburgh, a village in Suffolk where the Aldeburgh Festival takes place
- Aldbury, a village in Hertfordshire

== People ==
- Earl of Aldborough, a title in the peerage of Ireland
- Baroness of Aldborough (1693–1778), daughter of King George I of Great Britain
- Richard Aldborough (1607–1649), English politician

== Ships ==
- HMS Aldborough, the name of several Royal Navy vessels

== See also ==
- Aldbrough (disambiguation)
- Aldeburgh, Suffolk
