= Charters Towers railway station =

Railway station in Queensland, Australia

Charters Towers
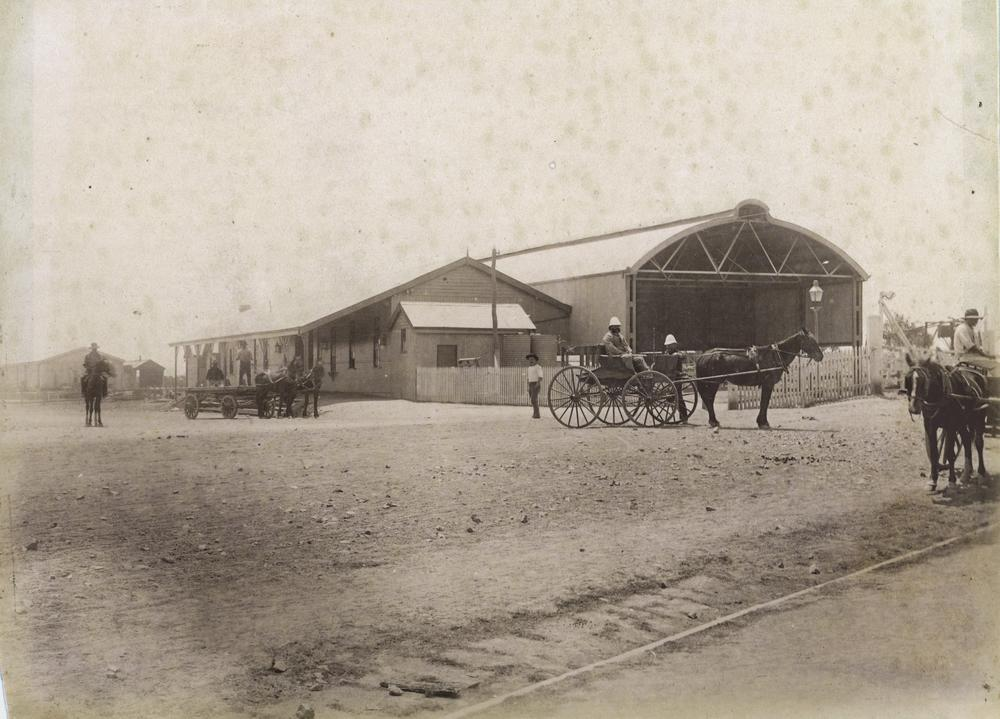
- Outside Charters Towers railway station, circa 1888

General information
- Location: New Queen Road, Charters Towers
- Owner: Queensland Rail
- Operator: Traveltrain
- Line: Great Northern
- Platforms: 1
- Tracks: 2

Construction
- Structure type: Ground
- Accessible: Yes

History
- Opened: December 1882
- Rebuilt: 1983

Services
Preceding station	Queensland Rail	Following station
Long distance rail services
Townsville Terminus	The Inlander	Pentland towards Mount Isa
Location

Charters Towers railway station (also known as Queenton railway station) is at Queenton, Charters Towers, Queensland, Australia. It is on the Great Northern line at Charters Towers, 134 kilometres (83 mi) west of Townsville in North Queensland, Australia.

== History ==
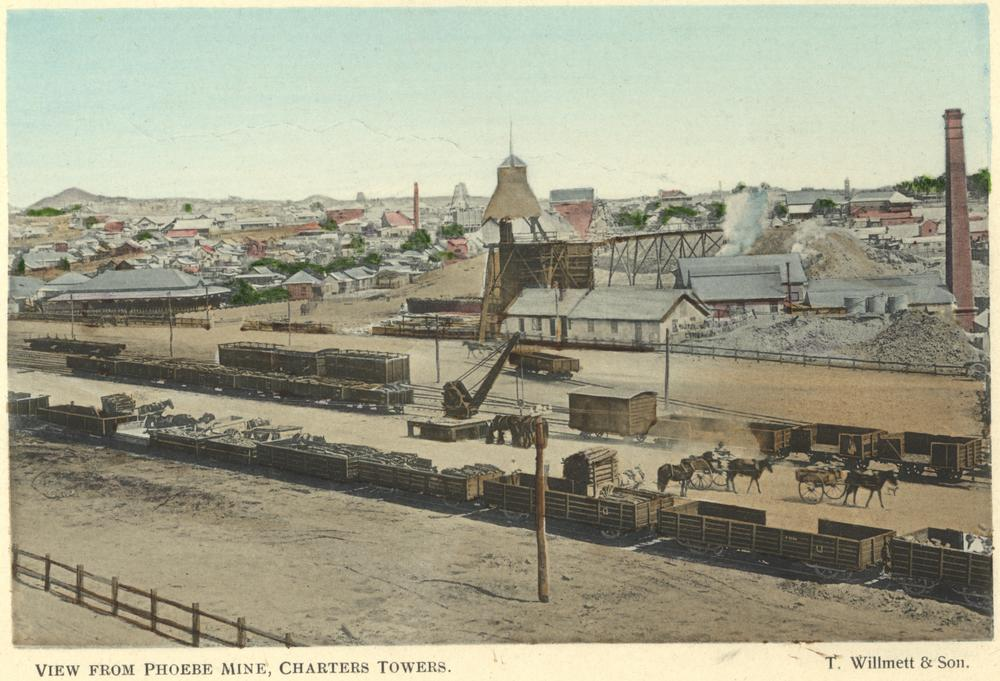
Looking across the railway from the Phoebe mine to the town centre in 1904

The line arrived at Charters Towers in December 1882 and eventually extended west to the city of Mount Isa in 1929. The line was built initially to connect Charters Towers with the Port of Townsville. The spark was the discovery of gold that had taken place in January 1872. Seven years later the rise in gold returns convinced the government to connect the centre to the coast with a more reliable transport conduit. The station was built at Queenton, midway between the two population centres of Charters Towers and Millchester. The station was opened in December 1882 by Premier Thomas McIlwraith.

The signals, crane and subway at the station were listed on the Queensland Heritage Register on 30 October 2008.

== Services ==
Charters Towers is served by Traveltrain's Inlander service

- the westbound service (3M34) stops at the station at 3.30pm Wednesday and Saturday
- the eastbound service (3231) stopping at the station at 7.05am Monday and Friday.
