= Broughton, Queensland =

Broughton
- Suburb
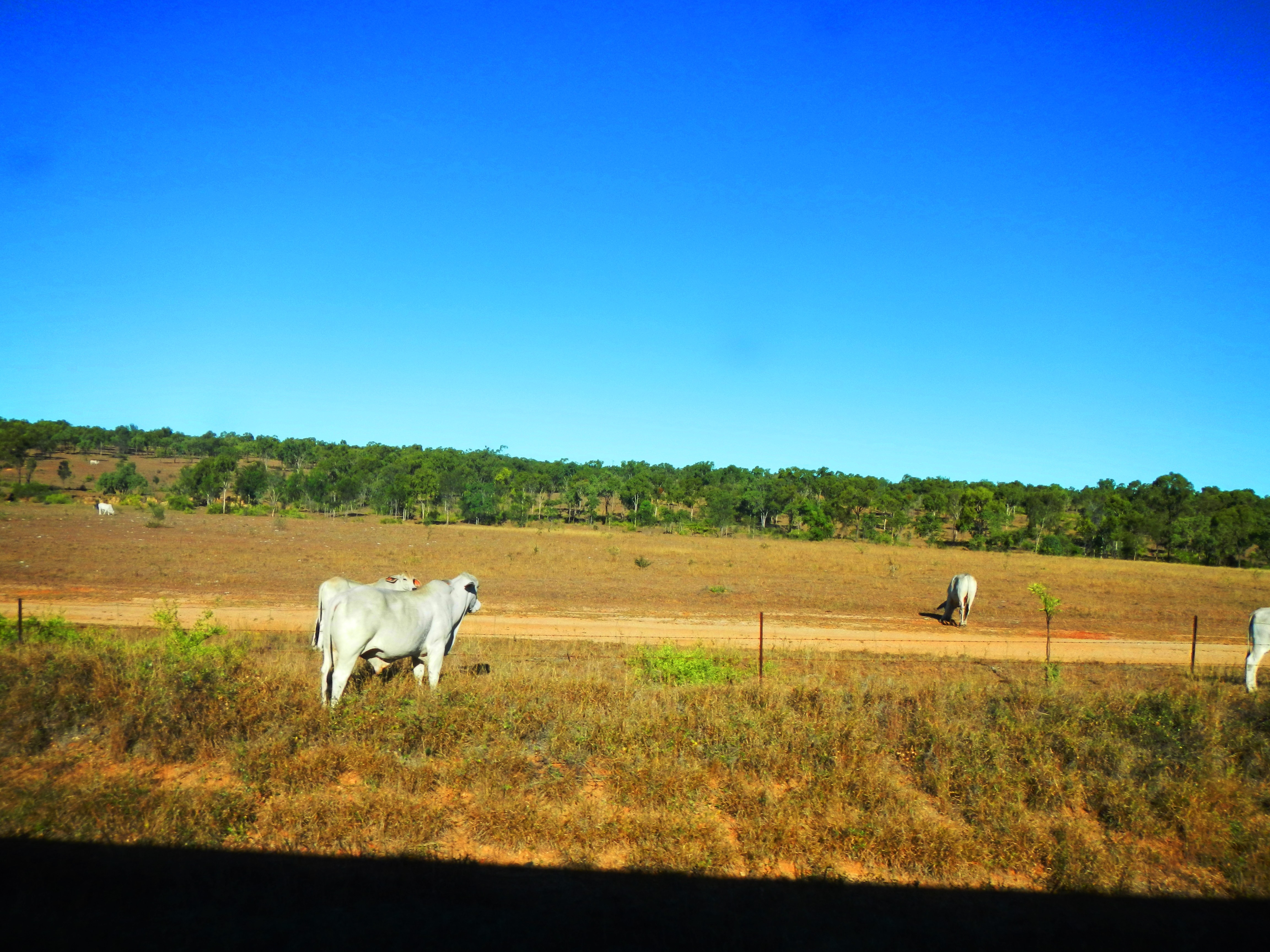
- Cattle in Broughton

- Interactive map of Broughton
- Coordinates: 20.0977°S 146.3255°E
- Country: Australia
- State: Queensland
- LGA: Charters Towers Region
- Location: 6.0 km (3.7 mi) SE of Charters Towers CBD; 140 km (87 mi) SW of Townsville; 1,312 km (815 mi) NNW of Brisbane

Government
  - State electorate: Traeger
  - Federal division: Kennedy

Area
  - Total: 283.4 km^{2} (109.4 sq mi)

Population
  - Total: 714 (2021 census)
  - Density: 2.5194/km^{2} (6.525/sq mi)
- Time zone: UTC+10:00 (AEST)
- Postcode: 4820
Suburbs around Broughton
Columbia; Queenton	Breddan	Dotswood
Millchester; Mosman Park	Broughton	Ravenswood
Black Jack	Seventy Mile	Seventy Mile

Broughton is a rural locality in the Charters Towers Region, Queensland, Australia. In the 2021 census, Broughton had a population of 714 people.

== Geography ==
The locality is bounded to the north-west by the Flinders Highway, to the east by the Burdekin River, and to the south by the Broughton River.

The Great Northern railway passes through the locality, entering from the north-east (Dotswood) across the Burdekin River and exits to the west (Queenton). Sellheim railway station serves the locality (20.0093°S 146.4151°E).

== History ==
Black Jack Provisional School opened on 21 March 1887. It became Black Jack State School on 6 July 1891. It closed in 1949. It was north of the Butler Blocks Mine to the east of Diamantina Road (approx 20.1362°S 146.2182°E), now within Broughton.

Broughton Road Provisional School opened circa 1895 and closed circa 1896 due to low student numbers. Broughton Road runs in a south-west direction from Millchester.

Broughton Provisional School opened in 1905. At the end of the school year in December 1905, the school had been operating for six weeks and there were about 20 students with teacher Miss Murray, estimated to be around half the children in the area. On 1 January 1909, it became Broughton State School. It closed in 1930. In 1934, the building was sold for removal. The precise location of the school is unclear, but the mines which motivated its establishment were located in the Broughton township area immediately north of the Broughton River near its confluence with the Burdekin River (in the vicinity of 20.1118°S 146.4198°E).

== Demographics ==
By 1879 the town had a population of 120.

In the 2016 census, Broughton had a population of 726 people.

In the 2021 census, Broughton had a population of 714 people.

== Education ==
There are no schools in Broughton. The nearest government primary schools are Millchester State School in neighbouring Millchester to the west, Charters Towers Central State School in Charters Towers CBD to the west, and Richmond Hill State School in Richmond Hill to the west. The nearest government secondary school is Charters Towers State High School in the Charters Towers CBD.

== Facilities ==
Sellheim Cemetery is on the south side of junction of the Flinders Highway with Harthorpe Road (20.0095°S 146.4014°E).
