= Stone kerbing, channels and footbridges of Charters Towers =

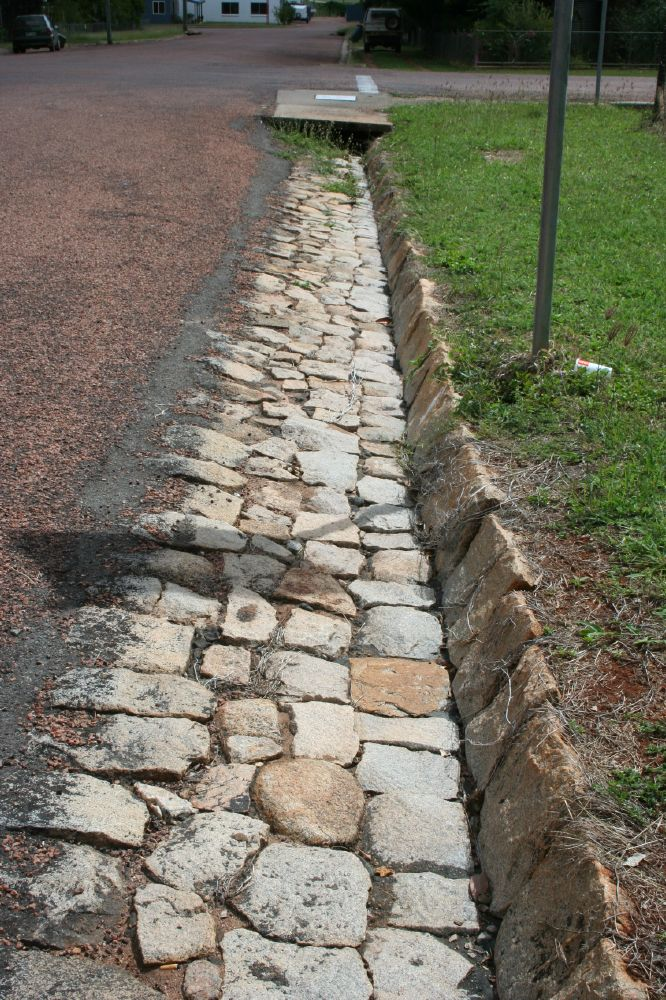
- Stone kerbing, channels and footbridges of Charters Towers

- Location within Queensland Location within Australia
- 20.078°S 146.2723°E
- Location: Various locations throughout Charters Towers, Charters Towers Region, Queensland, Australia

History
- Design period: 1870s–1890s (late 19th century)
- Built: c. 1884–1930s

Queensland Heritage Register
- Official name: Stone kerbing, channels and footbridges of Charters Towers
- Type: state heritage (built, archaeological)
- Designated: 7 February 2005
- Reference no.: 602512
- Significant period: 1880s–1930s (fabric); 1880s–1930s (historical)
- Significant components: bridge – foot/pedestrian, kerbing and channelling, bridge/viaduct – road, drain – storm water

The Stone kerbing, channels and footbridges of Charters Towers is a heritage-listed group of water infrastructure at various locations in Charters Towers City, Millchester, Queenton, and Richmond Hill throughout Charters Towers, Charters Towers Region, Queensland, Australia. It was built from c. 1884 to 1930s. It was added to the Queensland Heritage Register on 7 February 2005.

== History ==
Charters Towers was a principal gold mining centre from 1872 to 1907 and by 1901, it was Queensland's second largest town. The stone kerbs and channels are significant in highlighting the areas of the town that were settled during the town's mining heyday. Most of the early granite kerbing and channeling at Charters Towers was constructed between c. 1884 and c. 1905. Particularly fine examples of this work are evident with the original one square mile of the municipality, namely: Hodgkinson, Church, High, Lee, Bow, Anne, Mary and Deane Streets.

The early granite kerbs and channeling form a unique pattern of drainage that directs water through and out of the town. The early work directed storm-water into Mosman, Deane and St George Creeks. As the creeks themselves were stone-pitched to form drainage channels and then bridged, some of the land was re-claimed and buildings were constructed nearby. The most impressive example of this is the Deane Street kerb and channeling, which directs most of the water out of the city centre.

The masonry work was carried out by either day labour or by contractors. The stone was reportedly quarried nearby, but its exact location is yet to be determined. The network of footbridges that remains in the city today provides details of how early residents of Charters Towers made their way around the city during the wet season, from house yards, across footpaths, over kerbs, channels, and streets to gain access to all parts of the city for work and pleasure.

Gold was discovered in Charters Towers late in 1871 by Hugh Mosman and his 12 year old Aboriginal servant known as Jupiter Mosman, George Clarke and John Fraser. Their claim was registered at Ravenswood in early 1872 and the Charters Towers Gold Field was proclaimed on 31 August of that year. Settlement followed quickly with the arrival of other diggers eager to peg out their own claims, millers and small business operators. As the mines burrowed deeper and deeper into the granite, the small owner-operator mines were replaced by big companies employing wage miners.

Charters Towers was proclaimed a municipality on 21 June 1877 with its first Mayor and aldermen elected two months later. Only a small municipality, it embraces one square mile centred on Mosman Street. Much on the land within the municipality was unsurveyed and was occupied for residential purposes under Miners' Rights. Business life centred on the grid pattern of Gill, Deane, Bow, Ryan, Hodgkinson, Church, Åland, School and in particular, Mosman Street. In the early 1880s committees were in place to oversee council activity and make recommendations including an Improvement Committee. During this boom period many of the initial timber buildings were replaced by more substantial and impressive structures. Several civic improvements were undertaken by the Council including the construction of a water supply system from the Burdekin River, the development of the city's drainage system (i.e. storm-water kerbs, channeling and drains), the construction of footpaths, "metalling" of roads and the erection of bridges over creeks in the city.

By January 1884 a bridge was constructed over Hospital Creek, on a road leading from Charters Towers east to the railway station at Queenton. The contract for these works was won by Mr Walker who stabilised the creek with dry stone masonry and constructed a timber bridge over it. The bridge is reported to have been of great benefit to travelers on the Queenton Road.

In March 1884 the Charter Towers Municipal Council's Foreman of Works, Mr Hugh Swann, reported on the improvements works to roads in the town. Works nearing completion included: the clearing of the road in preparation for "metalling" and undertaking drainage work to the bridge and approaches near Plant's Day Dawn mine in Rutherford Street; repairing part of Elizabeth and other streets, forming part of Mary Street to carry part of the channel water and storm-water from Mosman Street; procuring material and repairing footpaths throughout the city; and repairing the Municipal's portion of Mosman Street that had been previously damaged by water from Plant's Day Dawn.

In September 1884 the Municipal Council's Improvement Committee supervised the construction of the Deane Street improvements works, including construction of a bridge at the intersection of Gill and Deane Street. The Foreman of Works, Mr Hugh Swann, initially suggested that Deane Creek should be considered the principal line for the main drain or sewer, as it drains two thirds of the municipality. However, the Council approved his second recommendation in which the creek was formed into a road with the middle of the street formed high as a carriageway, with footpaths, and stone pitched side channels pitched very wide and deep to create a large water-way. At the intersection of Gill Street a bridge was constructed across the creek that allowed the water in the two side channels to pass under it. The bridge was completed by the end of September 1884. The bridge decking was covered with metal to improve access on to the bridge. The two deep and wide channels in Deane Street were continued below the Gill Street intersection to Lissner Park. The successful crossing of Deane Creek provided for the development of the eastern end of Gill Street, which became the main street for commercial activity in Charters Towers.

There is one reported fatality involving the deep channel in Deane Street. In April 1886, an inquiry was held into the death of Annie Garvan who drowned when she was washed down channeling in Deane Street. Inquiry witness, Sarah Ball, reported that earlier that evening Annie Garvan, a neighbour often seen "under the influence of drink", had begged her for money to buy beer despite being already "quite stupified with drink". On being refused, Garvan said she was heading into town. Ball said that heavy rain started about an hour afterwards. Garvan is believed to have walked out of Jackson Lane into Deane Street where she lost her balance due to the force of the water running down the channel, reportedly two-feet deep at the time. The witness to the tragic accident, Alfred Rule, reported that the woman's body was carried down the channeling along Deane Street. At the inquiry he stated that he tried three times to rescue the woman before her body passed under the footbridge leading to the yard of the Bank of Australasia then under the "big bridge" (presumably the Gill and Deane Street bridge). Her body traveled the full length of Deane Street, past the Defiance Mill, and was found about 100 yards from the main creek.

On 25 October 1884 the Charters Towers Municipality was again calling for tenders for the erection of a bridge, this time over Mosman Creek in Mary Street. Tenders closed at 8 p.m. on Tuesday 4 November. It is not known who won the tender to do these works.

In November 1889 the Municipal Council erected a bridge over the creek below the Show Grounds. The works were supervised by the council's Foreman of Works, Mr Hodges. The contract was let to John McCourt. The masonry work in the creek described as very solid and strong, was laid using the hard bed rock for foundation. The timber bridge was constructed of hard wood. At the time it was constructed the Show Ground Bridge was described as the best bridge ever built in Charters Towers. During the wet season the new bridge provided residents who lived on the north-west side of the Charters Towers access to the commercial centre of the city.

By 1899, the Town Clerk, Mr Henry B Walker, in his Annual Report to Council reported that a variety of civic works had been undertaken during the year to enliven the character of Charters Towers, with the priority being road and pedestrian access. At the same meeting, Mayor Benjamin reported that work undertaken by the municipality in 1899 included parts of High, Mary, Mexican and Stubley Streets being stone kerbed, channeled, and tarred and footpaths formed. He stated that this work added to previous works of the same nature that had already been undertaken throughout much of the town.

As the population of the town waned following the end of the mining boom in 1907 many areas of the town were abandoned however the stone kerbs, channels and footbridge at Charters Towers continued to be maintained by the Charters Towers City Council. During the Depression of 1929 the Charters Towers City Council conducted maintenance work on the Gill and Deane Street intersection. The date 1929 is etched in the concrete. A number of the timber footbridges in Charters Towers were also replaced at this time with pre-stressed concrete. In 1990s the Council widened Deane Street, north of Gill Street, with no effect on the nature of the open channels. A steel safety fence replaced the original timber structure. It is not known when the original timber bridge was replaced.

Over time the street level in Charters Towers has raised and some areas of stone kerbs and channeling are now barely visible underneath soil and grass cover. In recent years new areas of stone kerbing and channeling have been identified. For instance, during the conservation works at the Venus State Battery in 2002 a section of early granite stone kerbing and channeling was uncovered in Jardine Street at the entrance to the Battery. Anecdotal evidence suggests that a similar section of early granite stone kerbing and channeling was uncovered at the base of Towers Hill.

In recent years the Charters Towers City Council has undertaken a program to repair the early granite kerbs and channeling at Charters Towers. For example, in 2003, a section of early dry stone granite kerbing on the northern side of Mosman Street, between Jane Street and Deane Street, was "capped" with another layer of granite stones. The stones were laid on top of the original granite kerbing using concrete. The new section of kerbing is easily distinguished from the original section as the stones have been set into concrete, similar to laying bricks, rather than using the traditional method of dry stone wall.

A section of Anne Street, between Boundary Street and Vulture Street, in which the early granite kerbing and channeling had been removed and replaced with eight concrete "Besser" blocks, was reconstructed with granite kerbing and channeling in August 2004.

== Description ==
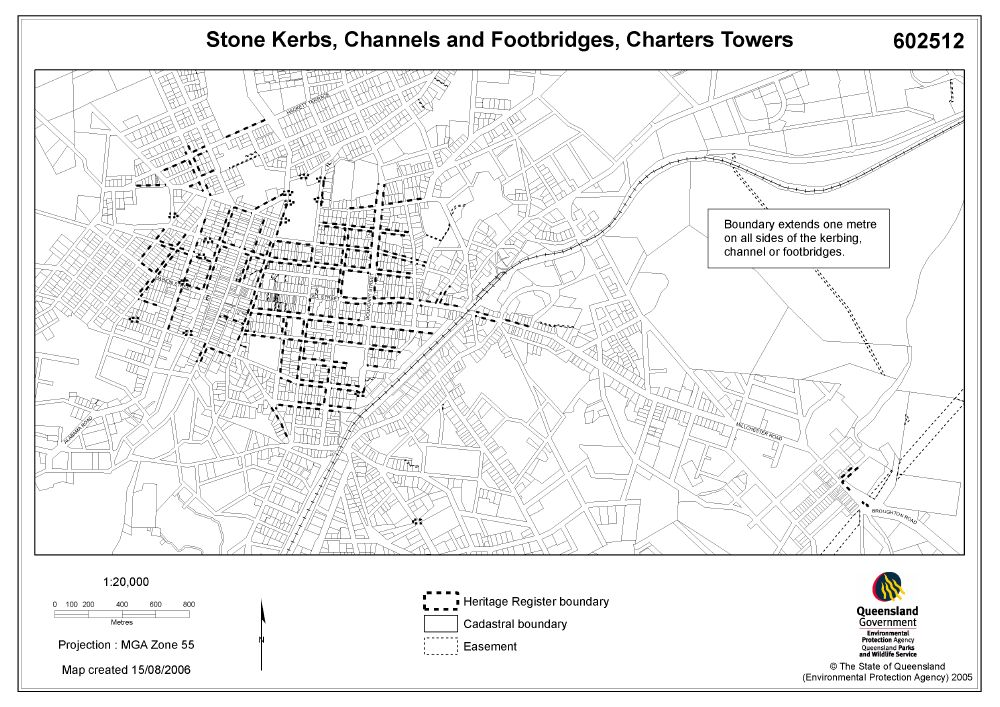
Map, 2006

The early kerbing and channeling at Charters Towers is constructed of granite, an igneous rock of coarse grain and consisting essentially of quartz together with feldspars and a mica. Granite is an excellent building stone because of its hardness and resistance to erosion.

The early granite kerbs and channeling at Charters Towers is constructed as dry stone masonry. It is visible in a number of streets throughout the city, with the boundary being from Hackett Terrace in the north, Jardine Street in the east, Daydawn Road in the south and Oxford Street in the west.

The kerbs have been constructed to several different depths, possibly dependent on the extent of storm-water run off in specific areas. The granite stone used to construct the kerbs are irregular in size, depending upon where they are located. For the most part, within the one square mile the stone used to construct the kerbs is approximately 200 by 300 millimetres (7.9 in × 11.8 in), with straight sides and a flat face. They are laid on an angle of approximately 75 to 80 degrees i.e. Deane Street, Church Street and High Street. Other kerbs on the eastern and southern side of the city have been laid on an angle of 50 to 65 degrees i.e. Marion Street and King Street. In other areas the granite stones are laid almost flat forming an early stone-pitched dish drain i.e. King Street.

In Gill Street, which has become the main centre for commercial activity within the city, most of the early granite kerbing and channeling has been removed and replaced with concrete kerb and channeling. However, there is a small section of stone kerb and channeling between High Street and Vulture Street. In these areas, the early granite kerbs and channeling has been covered with a layer of concrete, however it is still visible in places where the concrete capping has cracked or worn thin.

The granite channels vary in width throughout the town. Channels are between three and five stones in width, approximately 800 to 900 millimetres (31 to 35 in) wide. The stones are more irregular in shape and have a flat face.

In some areas individual stones have been removed, either dislodged and lying in the channel adjacent or missing. For example, on the southern side of Anne Street, between Deane Street and Church Street one stone had become dislodged and was lying in the channel. At the southern end of Mosman Street, in front of St Paul's Playhouse, four stones were lying in the adjacent channel. In other areas the early granite stone channel was covered with either bitumen or a thin layer of concrete, which has cracked to expose the stones underneath.

In recent years concrete slabs have been used to provide vehicular and pedestrian access to people's homes and businesses within the city. The concrete slabs, known locally as "cross-overs", have been placed across the early granite stone kerbs and channeling. Numerous cross-overs are located throughout the city.

The channeling to the streets from the slopes of Towers Hill directs storm-water runoff down the granite kerbs and channels along Deane Street. At the intersection of Deane and Gill Street, a large stone- pitched underground drain carries the water underneath Gill Street. The storm-water then flows along a steep stone-pitched open drain the length of Deane Street to the western boundary of Lissner Park. This opens into a wide stone-pitched open drain along the northern boundary of Lissner Park, formerly Mosman Creek. This northern end of town receives a large quantity of storm-water from the elevated areas of the town and was the original confluence of Deane Creek and Mosman Creek.

On the north, east and west boundary of Lissner Park there are five pedestrian footbridges and one road bridge that provide access across the open stone-pitched drain into the Park.

A pedestrian footbridge (No 1) is located on the northern boundary of Lissner Park. The footbridge is a simple beam bridge with a pair of steel girders supporting a timber deck spanning the 10.2-metre (33 ft) wide gap between the two concrete piers on either side of stone pitched drain, with a north–south orientation. A 15-centimetre (5.9 in) thick slab of pre-stressed concrete approximately 1.13 metres (3 ft 8 in) wide has been laid over the timber deck. Originally Mosman Creek, the drain contains the remains of the original dry stone wall on the northern side, however the southern side has been covered with concrete. There are round steel handrails on both sides of the footbridge.

A second pedestrian footbridge (No 2) is located on the north-east boundary of Lissner Park. The footbridge forms an extension of the footpath on the western side of Church Street. The footbridge is a beam bridge with a pair of steel girders supporting a 15-centimetre (5.9 in) thick concrete slab spanning the 18 metres (59 ft) wide gap between the two concrete piers on either side of the stone pitched drain. The bridge is orientated north–south. Etched into the western side of the concrete slab are the words "H.P. POOLE. MAYOR. 15.3.29". There are steel handrails on either side of the footbridge.

A third footbridge (No 3) is located on the eastern boundary of Lissner Park. The bridge provides pedestrian access through the Charters Towers City Council's Animal Enclosure, which is located on the eastern side of the Park. It is a beam bridge with steel girders supporting a 15-centimetre (5.9 in) thick concrete slab spanning 29.6 metres (97 ft) long x 1.7 metres (5 ft 7 in) wide. The piers are constructed on concrete. The bridge is orientated east–west. Access to the bridge on the western side is via a concrete ramp. Inscribed into the concrete ramp is the date "30.10.91". Access to the bridge on the eastern side is via four concrete steps, which have small granite stones inlaid in them. A plaque inside the animal enclosure notes that the site was upgraded in 1988 and was officially recognized by the Mayor, Alderman D E Birgan on 10 June 1988.

The fourth bridge (No 4) is a road bridge located on the western side of Lissner Park, which provides access for Charters Towers City Council staff into the Lissner Park Depot. It is a beam bridge with a pair of steel girders supporting a 3.3-metre (11 ft) wide timber deck on top of which has been laid a base of black plastic that has been covered with a 20-centimetre (7.9 in) thick concrete slab. The bridge spans 4.8 metres (16 ft) between two concrete piers and is orientated east–west. The bridge spans the Deane Street drain (originally Deane Creek), which contains the remains of the original dry stonewall on the northern side, however the southern side has been covered with concrete. There is park rail fence on both sides of the bridge. The fence is approximately 85 centimetres (33 in) high and consists of three steel posts and two steel rails, which have been painted white.

The fifth bridge (No 5) is a pedestrian footbridge located on the western side of Lissner Park at the intersection of Mosman and Deane Streets. This beam bridge is a simple bridge constructed by placing a pair of steel girders on two concrete piers on either side of the Deane Street drain. The steel girders support a 1.5-metre (4 ft 11 in) wide timber deck on top of which has been laid a 10-centimetre (3.9 in) thick concrete slab, which is approximately 6.1 metres (20 ft) long. The date "28.10.1940" has been etched into the concrete pier adjacent to Deane Street. There is a timber park rail fence comprising three posts and one rail (approximately 9.2-by-9.2-centimetre (3.6 in × 3.6 in) square posts) that have been painted white.

The sixth bridge (No 6) is a pedestrian footbridge located on the western side of Lissner Park opposite the intersection of Jane Street. The footbridge is a beam bridge that spans the Deane Street drain. It comprises a pair of steel girders on two concrete piers and supports a timber deck (timber slabs are approximately 20 centimetres (7.9 in) wide x 127 centimetres (50 in) long x 5 centimetres (2.0 in) thick) on top of which has been laid a 15-centimetre (5.9 in) thick concrete slab. The bridge is 5.5 metres (18 ft) long x 1.3 metres (4 ft 3 in) wide and is orientated east–west. There is a round iron post handrail on both sides of the bridge. They have been painted dark green and are an extension of the railing that is evident along the western boundary of Lissner Park, which is constructed of the same type and style of material and is also painted dark green.

The seventh bridge (No 7) is the 1889 Show Street Bridge, a single lane road bridge that is located on the southeastern corner of the Charters Towers Show Grounds. The original timber bridge has been replaced. Today the bridge is a beam bridge and consists of a 40-centimetre (16 in) thick slab of pre-stressed concrete approximately 6 metres (20 ft) wide and 6.6 metres (22 ft) long on three concrete piers. The Show Bridge is orientated north- south. The original granite stone-pitched open drain and approaches are still evident underneath the bridge. A single round steel post safety rail, painted white, has been placed on either side of the bridge. The eighth bridge (No 8) is the Mary Street Bridge, which is a pedestrian footbridge located on the north side of Mary Street between King Street and Stubley Street. It is a simple beam bridge that is constructed from a steel deck supported by two concrete piers. Inscribed into the western pier is "EAT 95". The bridge is orientated east–west. A single round steel post safety rail is located on either side of the bridge. The handrail is 104 centimetres (41 in) high. The drain underneath the footbridge has been lined with concrete, however there are stone pitched kerbs and channels on the southern side of the footbridge.

The ninth bridge (No 9) is the Elizabeth Street footbridge, which is located on the southern side of Elizabeth Street between King Street and Stubley Street. This beam bridge has been constructed by placing a pair of steel girders on two concrete piers on either side of a stone pitched drain. The steel girders support a 1.5-metre (4 ft 11 in) wide timber deck, which is 4.5 metres (15 ft) long. There is a park rail fence comprising three steel posts and one steel rail. Posts and rails are approximately 7-by-7-centimetre (2.8 in × 2.8 in) square posts that have been painted white. The handrails are 105 centimetres (41 in) high.

The tenth bridge (No 10) is located on the corner of Marion Street and Stubley Street. It is a pedestrian footbridge that provides access across a stone pitched drain. It is aligned east–west. The beam bridge has been constructed by placing a 15-centimetre (5.9 in) thick slab of pre-stressed concrete approximately 1.5 metres (4 ft 11 in) wide and 6.1 metres (20 ft) long on two concrete piers. There is a park rail fence comprising three steel posts and one steel rail. Posts and rails are approximately 7-by-7-centimetre (2.8 in × 2.8 in) square posts that have been painted white.

The eleventh bridge (No 11) is located on the northern side of Towers Street, between Rutherford Street and Stubley Street, opposite the Charters Towers and Dalrymple Family History Library. It is a pedestrian footbridge that provides access across a stone pitched drain. It is aligned east–west. The beam bridge has been constructed by placing a slab of pre-stressed concrete approximately 6.3 metres (21 ft) long on two concrete piers. The date "1.2.29" has been inscribed in the concrete on the northern face of the east pier. A safety rail constructed of a round steel post is located on the northern side of the footbridge.

The twelfth bridge (No 12) is located on the northern side of Towers Street at the terminus of King Street. It is a pedestrian footbridge that provides access across an earth and concrete creek. It is aligned east–west. The beam bridge consists of a pair of steel girders supporting an 11-centimetre (4.3 in) thick slab of pre-stressed concrete on two concrete piers. The date "23.8.37" has been etched into both concrete piers. The concrete slab has been poured onto sheets of galvanized steel. There is a label stuck on the steel sheeting, which is visible from underneath the bridge, which states: "Bondek I1 BMT Galvanised Z350 Coating. 2/12/2002 - Delivery Date".

The thirteenth bridge (No 13) is located on the northern end of Boundary Street. It is a pedestrian footbridge that consists of a simple beam bridge over a dry creek bed. The bridge includes a pair of steel girders supporting a slab of pre-stressed concrete on two concrete and stone piers. The bridge is 7.4 metres (24 ft) long and 96 centimetres (38 in) wide. There are steel handrails on either side of the footbridge.

The fourteenth bridge (No 14) is a pedestrian footbridge located on the western side of Brisk Street across a dry creek bed, which is adjacent to the School of Distance Education. The bridge is orientated north–south. The beam bridge includes a pair of steel girders supporting a 16-centimetre (6.3 in) slab of pre-stressed concrete on two concrete piers, which are approximately 1.5 metres (4 ft 11 in) high. The bridge is approximately 10 metres (33 ft) long x 1 metre (3 ft 3 in) wide. The concrete slab contains numerous paw prints, the date "25.7.85" and other dates that are not discernable, and the names "MARC" and "HECTOR".

At the eastern end of Mexican Street there is a small granite culvert with early granite kerbing and channeling located on both sides of it.

== Heritage listing ==
The stone kerbing, channels and footbridges of Charters Towers were listed on the Queensland Heritage Register on 7 February 2005 having satisfied the following criteria.

The place is important in demonstrating the evolution or pattern of Queensland's history.

The early granite kerbs, channels and footbridges at Charters Towers is important in demonstrating the pattern of Queensland's history, especially the important role of Charters Towers, once a prosperous gold mining centre and the second largest town in Queensland, in the development of far north Queensland in the late 19th and early 20th centuries.

The work was initiated in the mid-1880s after the Charters Towers Municipal Council, which was declared in 1877, commenced a number of other civic improvements, including a water supply from the Burdekin River, street formation and bridge construction.

The early granite kerbs and channels at Charters Towers are important in demonstrating the development of early drainage methods in mining towns in far north Queensland in the late 19th century.

The early pedestrian footbridges at Charters Towers demonstrate the evolution of Queensland's history, in particular, the role of pedestrian footbridges in the late 19th and early 20th centuries in providing access to residents and visitors at Charters Towers to their places of work, schools, churches, shops, banks, homes and recreational activities prior to the introduction and wide spread use of the motor vehicle.

The place demonstrates rare, uncommon or endangered aspects of Queensland's cultural heritage.

The early granite kerbs and channeling at Charters Towers is important in Queensland's history for its rarity value. Such extensive use of granite kerbs and channeling, illustrating the confidence and optimism of local business and civic leaders in the future of Charters Towers in the late 19th century, is known only in the far north Queensland town of Cooktown, where granite kerbs and channels were constructed between the period 1884 and 1910. Together they are significant as a rare and uncommon aspect of Queensland's cultural heritage.

The place has potential to yield information that will contribute to an understanding of Queensland's history.

The early granite kerbs and channeling at Charters Towers have the potential to yield information that will contribute to an understanding of Queensland's history. As the population of the town waned following the end of the mining boom in 1907 many areas of the town were abandoned.

Over time, the street levels have been raised. There is the possibility that sub-strata kerbing and channeling exist with the potential to extend the current body of knowledge about this early civic work of the Charters Towers Municipal Council.

The place is important because of its aesthetic significance.

The granite stone kerbs, channels and footbridges at Charters Towers contributes to the overall aesthetic quality of the historic streetscapes of Charters Towers and provides a high degree of unity to the townscape in its material and design. It contributes also to the distinctiveness of Charters Towers, and as such is valued by the local community and visitors to the historic mining town as an important element of Charters Tower's history and identity.

That the community values the early granite kerbing and channeling is evident in the actions of the Charters Towers City Council, which since the 1990s has been reconstructing areas of granite kerbing and channeling to complement the earlier work.
