= Millchester, Queensland =

Millchester
- Town
- Interactive map of Millchester
- Coordinates: 20.0876°S 146.2905°E
- Country: Australia
- State: Queensland
- City: Charters Towers
- LGA: Charters Towers Region
- Location: 3.8 km (2.4 mi) SE of Charters Towers CBD; 138 km (86 mi) SW of Townsville; 1,312 km (815 mi) NNW of Brisbane

Government
  - State electorate: Traeger
  - Federal division: Kennedy

Area
  - Total: 5.0 km^{2} (1.9 sq mi)

Population
  - Total: 543 (2021 census)
  - Density: 108.6/km^{2} (281.3/sq mi)
- Time zone: UTC+10:00 (AEST)
- Postcode: 4820
Localities around Millchester
Mosman Park	Queenton	Queenton
Mosman Park	Millchester	Broughton
Broughton	Broughton	Broughton

Millchester is a rural residential town and suburb in the Charters Towers Region, Queensland, Australia. In the 2021 census, the suburb of Millchester had a population of 543 people.

== Geography ==
Although historically the town centre is on Jardine Street Street (between Macdonald Street and Palmer Road) opposite the Venus State Battery, most of that area is currently used for grazing.

The land use is a mix of residential, grazing and some quarrying.

== History ==
Millchester State School opened on 21 September 1874.

Charters Towers School of Distance Education opened on 27 January 1987 as part of Australia's School of the Air. When the school opened, it relied on HF radio (using six 1000 watt transmitters) to speak with the students (with one person speaking at a time), the postal system to deliver printed materials, with occasional face-to-face opportunities in the field or at "camps" held in a major town. In 2002, the school replaced radio with teleconferencing, enabling simultaneous conversations between teacher and student. From 2010, it became possible to incorporate video-conferencing.

== Demographics ==
In the 2011 census, the suburb of Millchester had a population of 581 people.

In the 2016 census, the suburb of Millchester had a population of 543 people.

In the 2021 census, the suburb of Millchester had a population of 543 people.

== Heritage listings ==
Millchester has a number of heritage-listed sites, including:

- MacDonald Street: Venus State Battery
- Charters Towers mine shafts
- Stone kerbing, channels and footbridges of Charters Towers

== Education ==
Millchester State School is a government primary (Prep–6) school for boys and girls at on the corner of Bluff and Phillipson Roads (20.0891°S 146.2753°E). In 2018, the school had an enrolment of 162 students with 15 teachers (12 full-time equivalent) and 11 non-teaching staff (8 full-time equivalent).

Charters Towers School of Distance Education is a government primary and secondary (Early Childhood to Year 12) distance education school for boys and girls in outback locations without access to conventional schools. The school's motto is "Distance is no barrier". The teachers are at 15-23 Brisk Street (20.0894°S 146.2682°E) in Millchester. In 2018, the school had an enrolment of 2,137 students with 70 teachers (69 full-time equivalent) and 20 non-teaching staff (18 full-time equivalent). It includes a special education program (Prep–12).

There is no mainstream secondary school in Millchester. The nearest mainstream secondary school is Charters Towers State High School in Charters Towers City to the north-west.

== Attractions ==
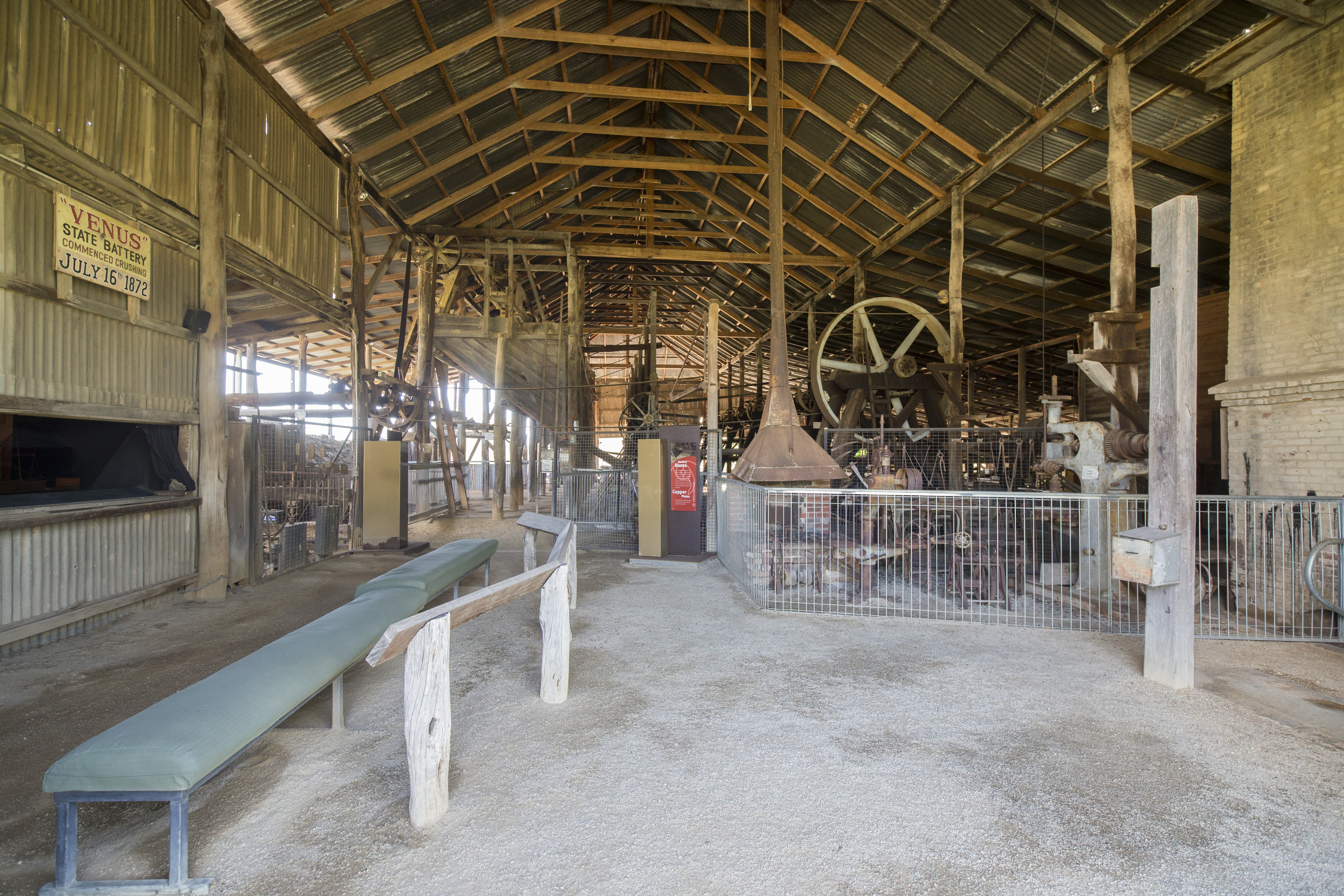
Venus State Battery, 2015

Venus Gold Battery is a tourist attraction showcasing the gold mining history of the area (20.0865°S 146.2934°E). It has guided tours and video-presentations.
