= Aldbrough =

Aldbrough could be the name of two places in England

- Aldbrough, East Riding of Yorkshire
- Aldbrough St John, North Yorkshire

== See also ==
- Aldborough (disambiguation)
- Aldeburgh, Suffolk
