= Signals, Crane and Subway, Charters Towers railway station =

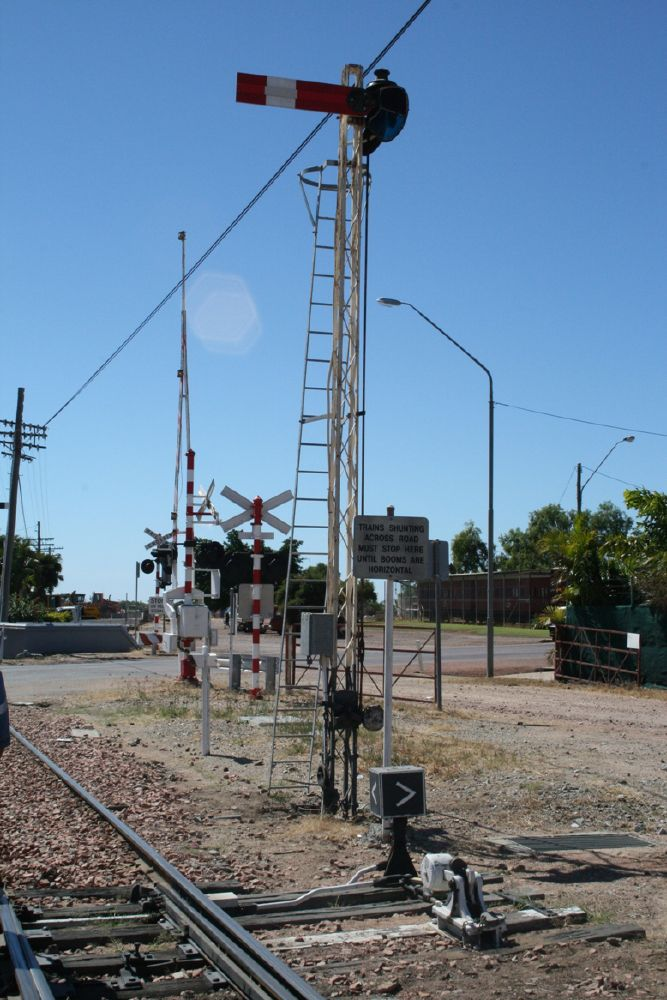
- Semaphore signal, south-west of Millchester Road, 2006

- Location within Queensland Location within Australia
- 20.0768°S 146.2714°E
- Location: Enterprise Road, Charters Towers, Charters Towers Region, Queensland, Australia

Queensland Heritage Register
- Official name: Signals, Crane and Subway, Charters Towers Railway Station
- Type: state heritage (built)
- Designated: 30 October 2008
- Reference no.: 602627
- Significant period: 1890s

The Signals, Crane and Subway are heritage-listed railway infrastructure at Charters Towers railway station, Enterprise Road, Charters Towers, Charters Towers Region, Queensland, Australia. They were added to the Queensland Heritage Register on 30 October 2008.

== History ==
The Charters Towers railway station was established in 1882 as the terminus of the Great Northern railway from the port of Townsville to the high-yielding Charters Towers Gold Field (proclaimed in 1871). Although the early buildings on the site have been replaced by late twentieth-century structures, the railway yards retain three elements important in illustrating the functioning of this place as the transportation hub of what was Queensland's largest and wealthiest gold-mining town at the turn of the nineteenth and twentieth centuries: a rare surviving operational mechanical safety system for managing railway traffic; An uncommon 1890 pedestrian underpass; and a large 10-ton crane (c. 1900) also now considered to be rare.

Surveying for a railway inland from Townsville to Charters Towers began in 1875; construction commenced in 1879; and the line to Charters Towers was opened on 4 December 1882. Subsequently extended, the line reached Hughenden in 1887, Cloncurry in 1907, and Mount Isa in 1929. A south-west extension from Hughenden reached Winton in 1899.

The railway to Charters Towers boosted the town's prosperity by lowering the cost of supplies and building materials. Branch lines and sidings radiated out from the railway station to the various gold mines around the municipality, which boomed during the 1880s. Charters Towers continued to prosper throughout the depressed economic conditions of the 1890s with a peak production of 319,572 ounces of gold in 1899, and a population of around 26,500 the same year. After 1899 there was a steady decline in gold production. In 1912 the Warden reported that the extreme depth for profitable mining had been reached, and most mines had been abandoned by 1916. The last of the big mines, the Brilliant Extended, closed in 1917, but small mining operations continued to be serviced by the Venus battery, which was owned by the Queensland government from 1919. By 1921 Charters Towers' population had decreased to 5,682.

The history of the Charters Towers railway station reflects the rise and fall of the city, and the station was once a substantial complex. In 1901, the railway yards north of Gill Street included an office and refreshment room with a carriage shade over the tracks; a carriage shed and two engine sheds; a coal stage, workshops, kerosene store, sheep yards, several residences and a number of sidings. There were two sets of railway gates across Gill Street. South of Gill Street by 1905 there was a goods shed, another engine shed, a 2-ton crane, a pedestrian overbridge, and more sidings. By 1985 there were also two signal cabins, located at each end of the old station building, plus a signalling hut near the pedestrian underpass. The signal frame once operated in two parts, and was relocated from elsewhere in the yard when the new station building was constructed in the mid 1980s, and the new signal cabin was commissioned in 1987. All of the early buildings and the sidings to various gold mines have been removed.

Although the railway station complex is much smaller than in its heyday, evidence of its former importance survives in the form of a multitude of short sidings in the yards, and the mechanical interlocking system. In addition, an 1890 concrete subway for pedestrian traffic, constructed adjacent to the south-west end of the station building at what was then known as the Queenton Crossing, still exists. The station has also operated a 10-ton crane at various times. The existing 10-ton crane, with a small timber platform, stands south-west of the Gill Street crossing and is similar to a smaller Ransomes and Rapier 5-ton crane supplied to Yuleba in 1902 (not extant). The Charters Towers crane may date from the same period. Hand operated, it was one of heaviest cranes used by Queensland Railways, and it is a rare example of its type and capacity, comparable to other large cranes at Jandowae, Trinity Wharf in Cairns, and Cloncurry.

Before railway "safeworking" systems were computerised and centralised in Queensland, mechanical signals were controlled from signal cabins, which dealt with the traffic on a particular block of railway line. Signal cabins coordinated signals that indicated whether or not a section of track was clear of other traffic. Early signals were mechanical, while later signals were operated electrically. The most common form of mechanical signal was the semaphore signal. These consisted of a metal framed tower with one or more arms that could be inclined at different angles, with the arm at the horizontal signalling "danger", or do not proceed. Mechanical signals were usually worked by a wire cable running from the signal box, although electrical or hydraulic operation could be used for more distant signals. At night, lights were necessary, and kerosene lamps with movable coloured spectacles displayed different colours, including green (proceed), yellow (prepare to find next signal red), and red (stop). Later, electrical coloured lights were used. Smaller points indicator signals, which confirmed whether or not points had been switched, could be used for shunting within a railway yard, and the most common form was the rotating disc signal. These could also contain a kerosene lamp for night operation.

To coordinate signals so that is impossible to give a "clear" signal to a train unless the route is actually clear, the signals could be interlocked. An interlocked yard is a railway yard where semaphore or coloured light signals are controlled in such a way that the signals will not allow a train to proceed unless the points that operate in conjunction with the signals are correctly set. A mechanical interlocking device, located under a mechanical signal frame, is a system of rods, sliding bars and levers that are configured so that points cannot be changed in conflict, thus preventing movements that may cause a collision or other accident. For example, unless two levers for a section of main line running past a loop siding are set to "stop" (clearing that section of main line), then a third lever controlling the points for the loop siding cannot be moved, and any train on the siding cannot enter the main line.

Large levers on the signal frame enabled operators to manually move points, signals or crossing gates. The earliest designs used various ingenious and patented methods to interlock the levers. In later electro-mechanical interlocking, where the points and signals were moved by electricity or electro-pneumatically, the signal frames had much smaller levers. Every interlocking installation is individual and unique to the location controlled, and the location and configuration of signal frames at a particular train station may vary over time, as needs change.

McKenzie and Holland (originally McKenzie, Clunes & Holland) were one of the earliest signalling contractors in Britain and supplied many railway companies. In 1873 they introduced a new design of lever frame that would set the style of all frames to come. A dogleg on the shape of the levers allowed them to stand upright in the frame when in the normal position, which made them easier for a signalman to reach. The style of locking mechanism used by McKenzie and Holland from 1873 was known as cam and soldier locking, but cam and t-bar locking was introduced in 1886, and in the early 1890s McKenzie and Holland adopted tappet locking.

At the International Exhibition in Sydney in 1880, Arthur Orpen Herbert, the Commissioner for Queensland Railway, was impressed by a display of McKenzie and Holland interlocking machines. Queensland ordered equipment for Roma Street and Ipswich stations and this arrived in October 1881. Charters Towers initially needed a complex interlocking system because of its gradient, and the system of tram tracks that used to run to the station from various mine sites. A number of dead-end lines or "traps" were necessary as "roll away" protection for loose wagons. Although 169 Queensland railway stations had interlocking by 1918, mechanical interlocking technology eventually became obsolete, as electrical interlocking or electro- pneumatic systems replaced it. Centralised Traffic Control (CTC) signalling systems now control most of the network. This is an electronic version of interlocking where the signals and points controlling movement, and the allocation of a block of track to a particular train, are operated from a remote location by computer.

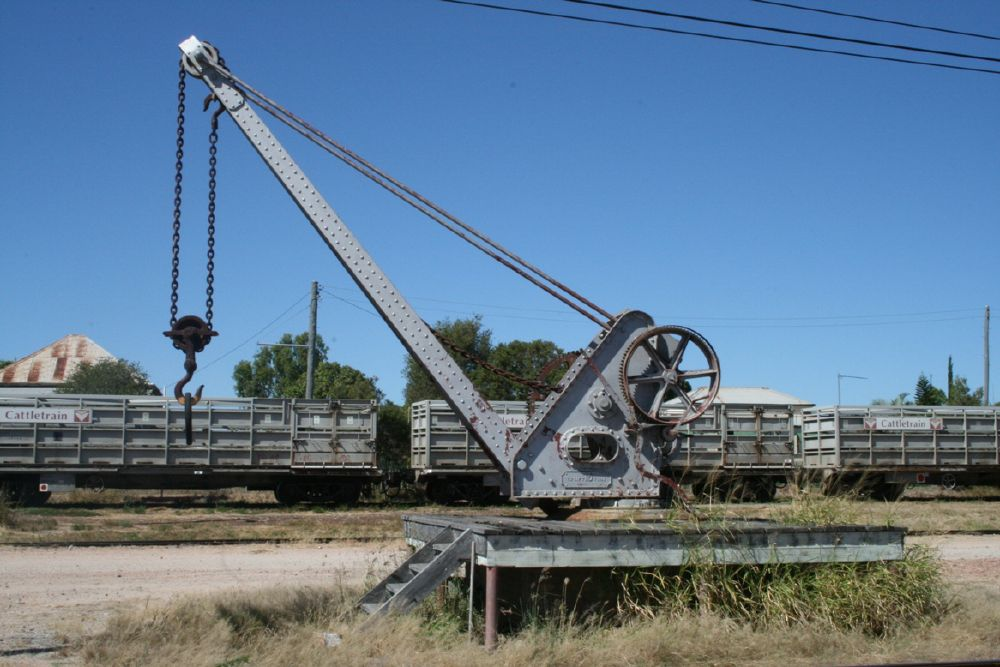
Crane, south-est of Millchester Road, 2006

== Description ==
The railway station is located near the intersection of Enterprise Road and Gill Street (the main street of Charters Towers) and a pedestrian underpass runs under the railway line where it crosses Gill Street. The Charters Towers railway station now consists of a flat-roofed 1980s office building and bitumen paved concrete platform, located north-east of the east end of Gill Street. There are other modern structures around the railway yards, but these and the 1980s office building are not considered to be of cultural heritage significance. However, located with the office building is the signal cabin, and located within the signal cabin is a mechanical signal frame of cultural heritage significance.

The fully interlocking McKenzie and Holland 20-lever mechanical signal frame in the signal cabin at the Charters Towers railway station is a rare surviving example of an operational mechanical safety system for managing railway traffic. The levers on the signal frame work an underfloor interlocking mechanism which is linked to points (tapering rails, used to transfer the train from one set of tracks to another), points indicators, crossing lights and signals around the railway station. The signalling equipment is located both sides of the Gill Street crossing, and a 10-ton crane south-west of the crossing also remains as a reminder that Charters Towers was once a thriving gold-mining town.

Although most of Queensland's railway signalling is controlled by computers, the interlocking system at Charters Towers is still controlled from a McKenzie and Holland low-level duplex tappet signal frame, numbered 21, which was manufactured in Melbourne. Its underfloor mechanism uses the duplex tappet system, with 5 inches (130 mm) between levers, similar to the frame at Ascot railway station in Brisbane, whereas the frame at the Kuranda railway station uses t-bar interlocking. The current 20-lever signal frame manipulates the points and signals of the station. Warning bells sound as a train approaches the station, and staff set the required levers to guide a train through the station or into a siding. The levers operate the points either manually, by long metal pull rods, or by activating an electric motor to change the points, while the semaphore signals are controlled by wires connected to the signal frame. Electric light signals and crossing lights are also operated from the signal frame.

A metal key, in the shape of a small metal rod, can be removed from a lock attached to the signal frame. This immobilises the signal frame levers, and the key can be used to unlock a smaller mechanical ground frame to the north-east of the station. This key lockout system is rare. The ground frame at Charters Towers, north-east of the station, has two levers on a small metal platform, and is used to control access to a siding.

The significant elements within the heritage boundary are as follows:

=== Signal frame, interlocking mechanism, and connecting rods and cables ===
Located in the signal cabin of the station, the McKenzie and Holland mechanical signal frame consists of 20 large red, blue and black levers, each tagged with a metal plate listing its number and function. The levers pivot between forward and back positions in a curved metal frame, with slots for each lever. Each segment of the frame between the levers is embossed with the words "McKenzie & Holland Melbourne". The interlocking mechanism is concealed under the floor of the cabin. Long metal rods with metal guides run north-east alongside the platform from the signal cabin to a set of points near the end of the platform. These rods mechanically link the signal cabin to the points, and to the nearby semaphore and points indicator. Cables also run to two semaphore towers south-west of Gill Street.

=== Points, points indicators, and semaphore towers ===
At the north-east end of the platform is a metal semaphore tower with a lantern, a set of points, and a points indicator. The points indicator is a lamp contained in a red and white painted metal box, and wire cables and a chain connected to the points activate the semaphore arm. Further along the track to the north-east are two sets of points, both controlled by electrical motors activated by lever 11 of the signal frame in the signal cabin. To the south-west of Gill Street are three sets of semi-trailable points - which either can be manually operated or can allow trains through before resetting themselves; three points indicators (black box with white chevrons); and two cable-operated semaphore towers.

=== Electric light signals ===
There are two signal poles north-east of the platform. These originally carried signal arms and kerosene lanterns, but they now display electrical lights. The lights at the level crossing are also controlled from the signal frame.

=== Ground frames ===
North-east of the platform, beyond the two electric light signals and the first set of electrically operated points, is a mechanical ground frame with two large levers. This activates two points for a dead-end siding south of the main lines. The most southern of these points, activated by a metal rod running from the ground frame, is attached to a points indicator consisting of a revolving red disk and a lantern.

=== Pedestrian underpass ===
Just to the south-west of the station building, but north of Gill Street, is a concrete pedestrian underpass (1890). Stairs descend at each end to an ovoid tunnel, which is truncated along its base by a pathway. Concrete walls with capping mark either entrance.

=== Crane ===
The large metal crane (c. 1900), on a concrete base, stands south-west of Gill Street, south of the main railway lines. It is surrounded by a small timber platform. A metal plate on the bottom of the crane reads "To Lift 10 tons".

== Heritage listing ==
The Signals, Crane and Subway at Charters Towers railway station were listed on the Queensland Heritage Register on 30 October 2008 having satisfied the following criteria.

The place is important in demonstrating the evolution or pattern of Queensland's history.

The fully interlocking McKenzie and Holland 20-lever mechanical signal frame (established c. 1890s and now located in a modern signal cabin) at the Charters Towers railway station, along with its associated underfloor mechanism, linkages, points, points indicators, and signals, both mechanically and electrically operated, is evidence of the evolution of signals technology and railway safety systems in Queensland. The manually operated two-lever ground frame, signals and points are also significant as examples of mechanical signalling technology.

The system of interlocked signals is surviving evidence of the former size and complexity of the Charters Towers railway station and yards. The multitude of sidings, which required interlocked signals, was a product of the extensive mining and commercial activity in Charters Towers during the late nineteenth century. The presence of a pedestrian underpass (1890), usually a feature of large metropolitan railway stations, also is evidence of the extent of activity at the Charters Towers railway station when Charters Towers was Queensland's largest and wealthiest gold-mining town.

The place demonstrates rare, uncommon or endangered aspects of Queensland's cultural heritage.

The interlocking and signalling equipment at the Charters Towers railway station is a rare surviving example of a mechanically operated railway safety system. The 10-ton crane (c. 1900) is a rare example of a large crane formerly used by Queensland Railways, and the concrete pedestrian tunnel is also an uncommon nineteenth century example of its type.

The place is important in demonstrating the principal characteristics of a particular class of cultural places.

The interlocked signalling system is a good surviving example of how train safety was managed prior to the advent of computerised systems. Each aspect of the system, from the signal frame's levers and its key lock-out system, through its linkages to the various points, points indicators and signals, demonstrates the functioning of early signals technology and its safety mechanisms. The interlocking system enabled humans to mechanically manipulate the signals, while precluding the possibility of collisions caused by human error.
