= Charters Towers mine shafts =

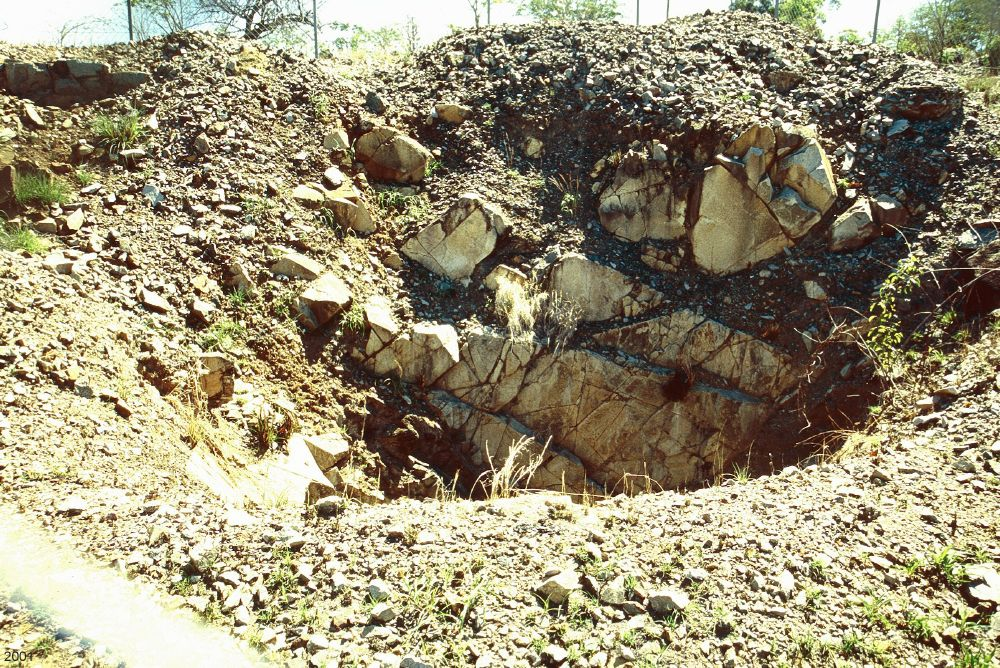
- Charters Towers gold mine shaft remains, 2001

- Location within Queensland Location within Australia
- 20.084°S 146.2642°E
- Location: Charters Towers, Charters Towers Region, Queensland, Australia

History
- Design period: 1870s–1890s (late 19th century)
- Built: 1883–1916

Queensland Heritage Register
- Official name: Charters Towers Gold Mine Shafts and Remains
- Type: state heritage (archaeological)
- Designated: 29 April 2003
- Reference no.: 602221
- Significant period: 1883–1916 (fabric, historical)
- Significant components: shaft, mounting block/stand, mullock heap, slab/s – concrete

Charters Towers mine shafts are a heritage-listed group of mine shafts and ruins at Charters Towers, Charters Towers Region, Queensland, Australia. It was built from 1883 to 1916. It was added to the Queensland Heritage Register on 29 April 2003.

== History ==
These eight vertical mine shafts are to be found amongst the suburban streets of Charters Towers and were developed during the period of intense gold mining that occurred on the Charters Towers Goldfield from 1872 to 1917. During this forty-five-year period, Charters Towers became one of the most important goldfields in Queensland, and in Australia, attracting heavy investment interest from overseas companies. At its peak it accounted for more than a third of Queensland's entire gold production. The success of the goldfield led to the permanent establishment of the town of Charters Towers and had a major impact on the continued settlement of North Queensland and the economy of Queensland as a whole.

Gold was discovered at the foot of Towers Hill in late 1871 and in August 1872 the Charters Towers Goldfield was officially proclaimed. There was little alluvial gold at Charters Towers, the major payable gold to be found in downward sloping reefs of gold-bearing ore. Gold mining in Charters Towers was characterised by deep underlie shafts with levels striking the various reefs that ran through the field. Vertical shafts were also a feature of the goldfield however not as common as the underlie shafts. (There are approximately 200 kilometres (120 mi) of mine shafts under Charter Towers.)

Because Charters Towers Goldfield was a reefing field it required capital and equipment for its development. Underground mining of this nature led to the development of more stable settlements as opposed to some of the fleeting settlements that developed and then disappeared around short-lived alluvial gold fields.

The gold mining leases (GMLs) that were taken up during the late 19th and early 20th centuries covered the entire area of Charters Towers in a patchwork fashion. Mining companies who held the leases would often sink several shafts on their land to cut the reefs, with unsuccessful prospecting being a common aspect of mining as well as the spectacular successes.

A heightened phase of prosperity was entered when the great wealth of the Day Dawn Reef was discovered in 1878. It was to become one of the highest producers of gold on the Charters Towers field. Charters Towers boomed throughout the 1880s, overshadowing all other mining centres in North Queensland. Increased speculation was triggered by the floating of companies on the London stock market from 1886 following a display of Charters Towers Gold at the Colonial and Indian Exhibition in London in 1885 and changes to investment law. British investors poured wealth into Charters Towers during this period providing the capital which gave rise to the substantial nature of the city and the continued large scale mining.

By 1886, thirty-three shafts had been sunk to below the 152-metre (499 ft) level and gold production had doubled since 1883. In 1889 the famous Brilliant Reef, the richest on the field, was discovered and Charters Towers continued to prosper throughout the depressed economy of the 1890s with its peak production of 319,572 ounces (9,059,700 g) of gold in 1899, and the population peaking to approximately 27,000 in 1900. The great numbers of wage-earning miners employed by the mining companies in Charters Towers also created an environment conducive to the growth of an industrial union which made a vital contribution to the Queensland labour movement.

Charters Towers was so full of confidence during its peak that its inhabitants referred to it as "The World". No other mining town in North Queensland came close to its prosperity and diversity.

The early 20th century was marked by a steady decline in gold production. Menghetti suggests that "... already an unhealthy amount of the return was coming from the re-treatment of the residues with the cyanide process which had arrived in Charters Towers in 1892". In the three years after 1910 the number of employed miners on the field fell from 2,631 to 985. Government subsidies were granted to some mines for further exploration, however this yielded little and the population of Charters Towers began to drift away.

Most mines had been abandoned by 1916 with the last of the big mines, the Brilliant Extended, closing down in 1917. By the end of this peak gold mining period, Charters Towers Goldfield had produced about 7 million ounces of gold.

Throughout World War I, most of the infrastructure around the mines (e.g. headframes, poppet heads and machinery) was dismantled for recycling purposes during the war effort. In many cases the infrastructure was simply moved to new mines.

During the 1960s the Charters Towers City Council constructed fences around the remaining mine shafts. In recent years a program of capping many old mine shafts has been in place. The Department of Natural Resources and Mines currently maintain the mineshafts.

=== Day Dawn Block and Wyndham ===
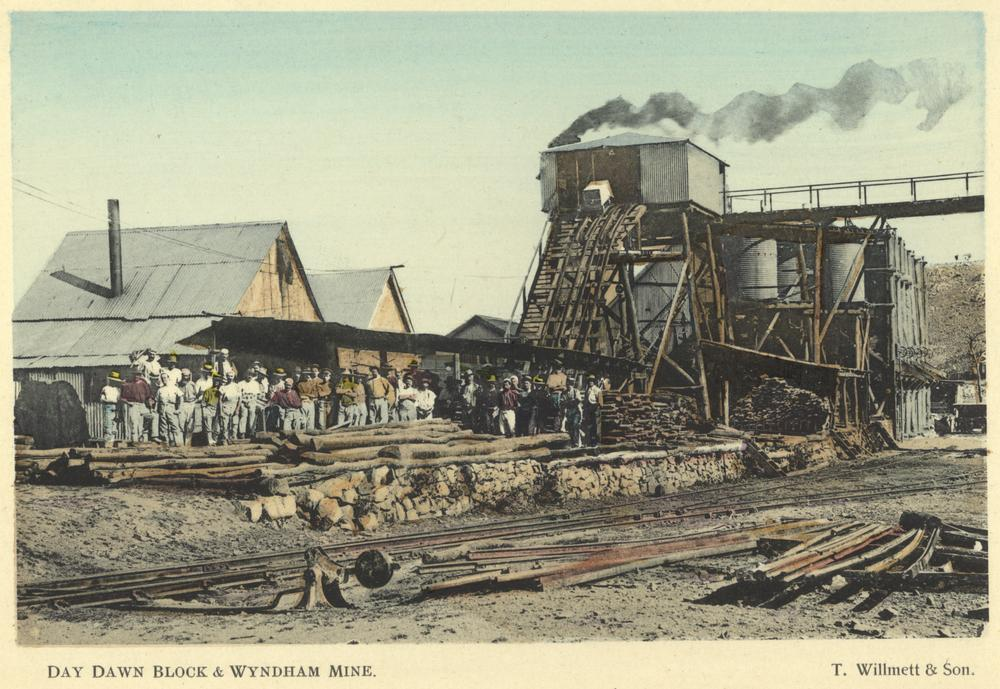
Day Dawn Block and Wyndham Mine, 1904

The Day Dawn Block and Wyndham Company worked three shafts on the Day Dawn reef continuously from 1883 to 1912 and was one of the three great mines on the Day Dawn lode. It had the greatest yield of any mine on the Charters Towers goldfield: 589,531 long tons (598,991 t) of ore was raised for 546,531 ounces (15,493,900 g) of gold. The mine was situated on Gold Mining Leases 1807, 1808, & 1809 on an area of 100 acres (40 ha).

Tom Mills took up the Day Dawn Block in 1880 to complement his lease on the Wyndham mine alongside in the west. This "Block" lease, as it was known, was forfeited and then taken up by J. Malone and A. Young who formed the Day Dawn Block Company and started a vertical shaft to cut the Day Dawn lode. Litigation over this lease instituted by Mills against the company resulted in a compromise where the Wyndham lease was amalgamated with the Day Dawn Block and the Day Dawn Block and Wyndham Company was formed in 1882. The No. 1 shaft was on the former Day Dawn Block lease and was on the eastern boundary of the Day Dawn Block and Wyndham lease. In June 1883 a straight shaft was sunk and it cut the Day Dawn reef at 475 feet (145 m). The Northern Mining Register Christmas Number of 1891 said, "Never before in the history of the field or perhaps in Australia, has a block shaft bottomed on such a show" The shaft was a small one but from it between the walls was taken 32 ton of stone which yielded 187 ounced 16 dwt 6 gr (of gold)." (P.51). By 1897 the No.1 shaft was abandoned.

The No. 2 shaft was an underlie shaft and was sited on the original Wyndham lease on the eastern side of Upper Mosman Street.

The No.3 shaft in the west was a vertical shaft to a depth of 560 feet (170 m). An underlie shaft then followed the lode and intersected a shoot at a depth of 1,200 feet (370 m). It was when this shaft was connected to the No.2 shaft at the No. 14 level that rock drills were first used with success on the goldfield: The North Queensland Register's Mining History of Charters Towers remarked that '... the ground was terrifically hard and the contractor Mr Beith, lost money.'

In 1886 the mine was sold to a British company which in 1897 had paid- up capital of £500,000. The three mines were connected by tramway to the main rail line where the ore was transported to the company's mill at Selheim. (The mill at Selheim is extant). This was 14 miles (23 km) to the east on the Burdekin where 60 head of stamps made it the largest reducing plant of the goldfield. In 1900 the company employed 225 men.

With reserves depleted, work started on the Talisman reef with reasonable returns from 1904 to 1906. There was a gradual decline and the company entered voluntary liquidation in 1909 with tributors working the mine until it closed in 1912.

=== Day Dawn Freehold Extended ===
This shaft was identified as part of the Day Dawn Freehold Extended Mine on Jack, Rand and Maitland's map of 1898. It was sunk at the western end of the Day Dawn reef and in 1898 had a vertical depth of 1,079 feet (329 m).

From the early days of the goldfield nothing payable was found on the surface in this vicinity. Around 1887 the Day Dawn Consols Company, with shares principally held in Melbourne, was floated to prospect the area at greater depth. A two-chamber shaft was sunk to a depth of 500 feet (150 m) at the southern end of the common boundary of the company's two leases, GML 1685 & 1684 comprising 25 acres (10 ha). Soon after the ground was virtually abandoned.

The Day Dawn Freehold Extended Gold Mining Company was floated locally around 1896–97 to take over the rights and the machinery of the first company. The company had capital of £50,000 in 100,000 shares at 10/- each. The new company sank a shaft cutting the Day Dawn reef at 1,100 feet (340 m). It was then taken to 1,250 feet (380 m) with an underlie shaft opened and sunk a further 50 feet (15 m). The No.1 west level was driven 550 feet (170 m) with only poor stone being found. The No.1 East level was driven 495 feet (151 m) with two levels being opened and fair quality ore being reported in 1897.

In 1898 the mine was taken over by the Dawn Gold Mines on GMLs 1882, 1883 & 2052 on over 69 acres (28 ha) with capital of £100,000. Prospecting work was undertaken on the Talisman reef from 1905 to 1907 without success, followed by the acquisition of the Wallis Day Dawn lease to the west in 1910 which also failed to produce payable ore. The mine was closed in 1911.

=== Plant's Day Dawn ===
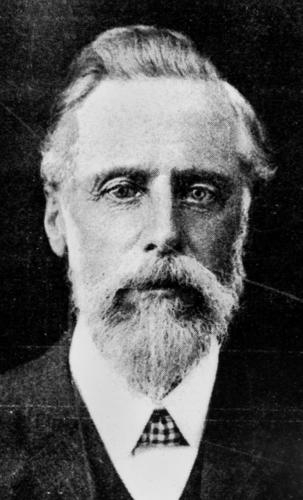
Edmund Plant

Plant's Day Dawn Gold Mines Ltd held land north of the Day Dawn Block and Wyndham lease on GMLs 1702 & 1703 on an area of 50 acres (20 ha). In 1902 a deep shaft was sunk to cut the Day Dawn reef. The shaft reached a depth of 1,200 feet (370 m) by 1906, after which work was ceased.

This shaft is associated with Edmund Plant the influential mining magnate of Charters Towers who was responsible for the construction of the Venus Battery and Thornburgh House and is credited with making a major contribution to the industry and life of Charters Towers.

=== Brilliant Deeps ===
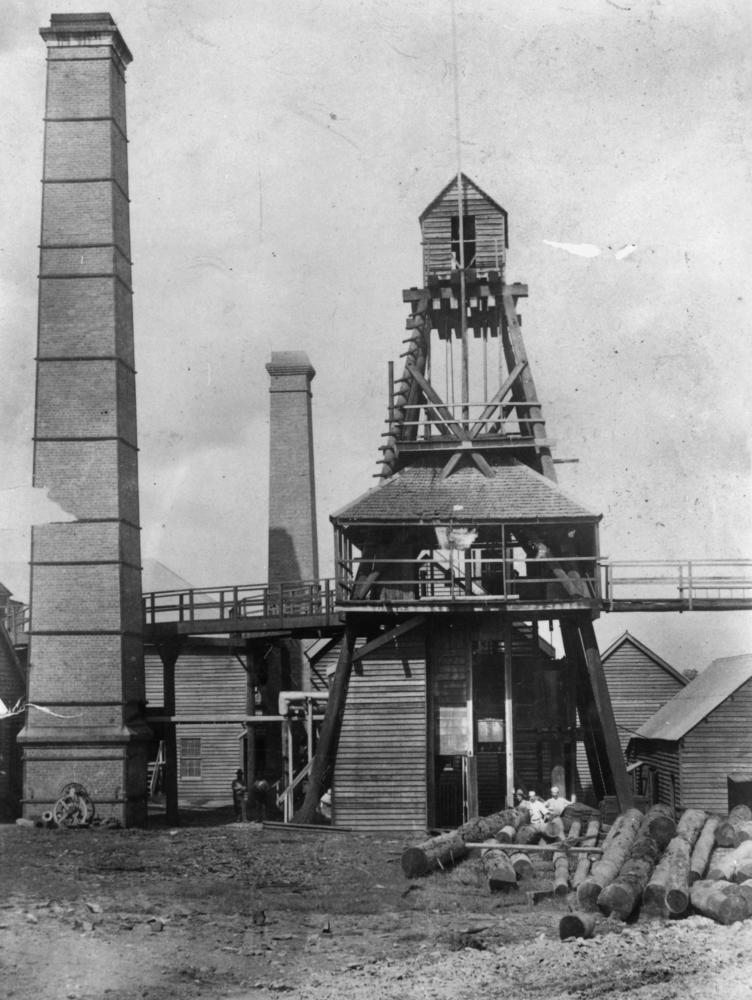
Pithead at the Brilliant Deep Mine, circa 1891

According to the Sydney Mail of 17 August 1895, 'The most important event of the past ten years from a Charters Towers point of view was the striking of what is now known as the Brilliant Reef...'(p337). The discoveries on the Brilliant Reef ensured the field's survival during the depression of the 1890s and in the excitement that followed the discovery the Charters Towers Stock Exchange was reconstructed, opening for business in Mosman Street in 1890.

Numerous mines developed to exploit the Brilliant Reef in the Queenton area of Charters Towers lying to the east of the city. The Brilliant Deeps shaft was sunk on a 31-acre (13 ha) gold mining lease. It was taken up in 1891 as the Brilliant Extended Block when the company sunk a three compartment vertical shaft to over 2,000 feet (610 m) in depth.

Because of a lack of capital, the company was reconstituted in 1896 as the Brilliant Deep Levels Gold Mining Company. The shaft was then carried to 2,250 feet (690 m) where the lode was intersected, but it was not payable. An explosion of dynamite of Christmas Day 1896 damaged the shaft collar throwing 30 men out of work. An underlie shaft had been driven to 2,615 feet (797 m) but no payable ore was found and operations were suspended in 1904 due to difficulty in ventilating the shafts.

Until 1907, returns from the Brilliant Deeps shaft were minimal. From 1897 to 1899 a mere 69 ounces (2,000 g) of gold was produced and from 1900 to 1907 there were no returns at all.

In 1907 the company was reconstituted as the Brilliant Deeps Ltd and the western ground was prospected with greater success when the "hanging wall" reef was struck in the No.2 west level and from 1908 regular crushings were obtained. In 1911 the "footwall" reef was found in extending the No.4 level west at a depth of 2,811 feet (857 m). In 1914 the "hanging wall" workings were connected to the Brilliant Block workings for ventilation purposes.

From 1908 to 1916, 22,843 ounces (647,600 g) were returned making it a mediocre producer. The Brilliant Deeps was the mine with the deepest vertical descent on the Charters Towers Goldfield.

Prospecting has been resumed on this site with the Charters Towers Gold Mining Company digging immediately adjacent to the old shaft, aiming for the reserves on the Brilliant Reef which are reputed to still lie beneath.

=== Queen Cross Extended ===
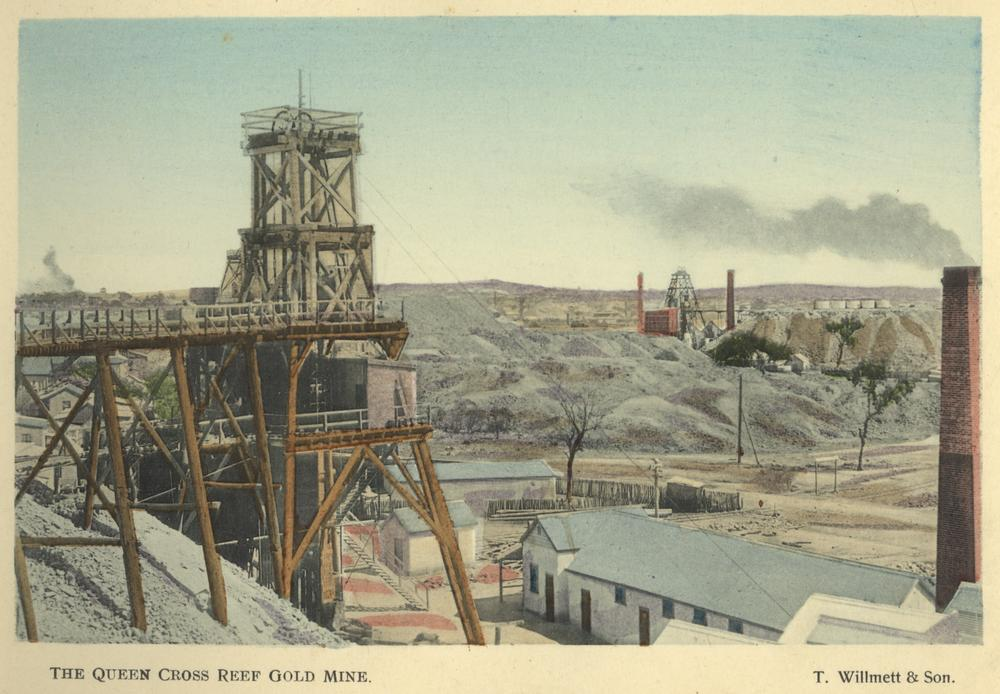
Queen Cross Reef gold mine, 1904

While many of the mines in Charters Towers experienced a gradual decline after the turn of the century, one last rich find was made in 1902 with the discovery of the New Queen Cross Reef. In 1902, GML 1913, then named the East Victoria, was surveyed to the east of the Victoria and Queen reefs. By 1905 it was renamed the Queen Cross Extended and comprised 2 acres (0.81 ha) of land. It was at this time that the shaft for the Queen Cross Extended Mine was sunk on this lease. Returns from the mine were first reported in late 1905 with July's crushings giving a yield of 51 long tons (52 t) of ore for 19 ounces (540 g) 15 pennyweights (0.82 oz; 23 g). The amount of ore raised was very small and the mine was soon closed. As the history of neighbouring mines would indicate, this mine probably held no great promise for high returns.

=== New Queen Central ===
The New Queen Central Mining Company operated from 1892 to 1916 with very little success. Two vertical shafts were sunk on GML 1602 and five reefs were worked including the Just-in-time, "Old" Queen Cross, 'New Queen Cross, Victory and the Brilliant but even though other surrounding mines had rich pay shoots, very little ore extended onto this ground.

The No.2 shaft was at the eastern boundary of the lease and cut the Just-in-Time reef at 600 feet (180 m) and the "New" Queen Cross reef at 846 feet (258 m) at which depth levels were driven with little success. The vertical shaft was continued with formations being opened up at 1,453 feet (443 m) (approximating the Brilliant reef) and 1,868 feet (569 m).

By 1916 the company held GMLs 2478 and 2483 and had raised 7,626 long tons (7,748 t) of ore with a yield of 8,157 ounces (231,200 g) of gold and dividends of £1500. The mine closed in June 1916.

=== St George and Moonstone ===
In 1917 Reid reported this shaft as that of the St George and Moonstone Gold Mining Company on GML 2457. This shaft was sunk in 1915, subsidised by the government to 798 feet (243 m), intending to intersect the Moonstone reef.

The Moonstone reef was one of the earliest to be worked in Charters Towers on the southern side of Towers Hill in 1872. In the 1890s Millet's Wellington, which was an amalgam of claims on the Wellington and Madeline reefs, dominated mining activity on this side of the hill with the Moonstone reef on the higher ground to the north being worked by various "Moonstone" companies. When Maitland carried out his survey in 1898, the Havelock Block on GML 1509 to the north of Millet's Wellington, was abandoned giving some suggestion that prior to 1898, the St George and Moonstone Shaft was on a claim previously taken up to work the Havelock Reef.

The prospecting in 1915 was unsuccessful and operations were suspended and the mine was closed.

== Description ==
=== Day Day Block and Wyndham No 1 Shaft ===
The shaft is located close to the western side of Upper Deane Street, on vacant land. It is surrounded by a 10 by 6 metres (33 ft × 20 ft) chain wire safety fence and is visible from the street. The shaft opening is 3 metres (9.8 ft) across with a predominantly rock collar. The eastern and northern side of the shaft openings however, show some small evidence of collapse in recent times. The ground within the fence is lightly grassed and free of debris. There are no other mine remains in evidence but evidence of the tramway which connected this, the No.2 and no.3 shafts of the Day Block and Wyndham Co. to the main railway lines lies beside the shaft.

=== Day Day Block and Wyndham No 3 Shaft ===
The shaft, machinery foundations and mullock heaps are located on vacant land on the eastern side of Stubley Street and are visible from the road. The area is accessed by a drivable track off Stubley Street, diagonally opposite Day Street.

The shaft is open and well defined behind a 12 by 13 metres (39 ft × 43 ft) chain wire safety fence erected in the 1960s by the City Council. The vertical shaft has a rock collar and is claimed to have a vertical depth of 568 feet (173 m). Within the fence there are the remains of two of the mine's head frame leg footings.

The fenced area of the shaft is flanked on either side by small mullock heaps which rise to high ground behind the shaft.

Opposite the shaft, (across the track) are the remains of large concrete and brick, machinery and building foundations. Slightly to the west of these large foundations is a large rectangular concrete slab close to the curb of Stubley Street.

Houses sit close to this area on the northern side.

=== Day Dawn Freehold Extended ===
The shaft is located at the southern end of Oxford Street on vacant land. Access can also be gained by Faull Street, (a dirt track), off Cambridge Street.

The vertical shaft sits directly behind a house and is open and well defined within a chain wire safety fence 18 by 18 metres (59 ft × 59 ft). The entrance to the shaft is very wide and overgrown and is claimed to have a vertical depth of 1,185 feet (361 m). Three of the mine's concrete footings for the head frame legs are visible inside the fence.

Across the track, opposite the shaft are the concrete and brick remains of a settling pond. Some small mullock heaps are visible to the east of this structure and a large excavation is in evidence further again to the east.

A natural ridge runs east west to the south of this area.

=== Plant's Day Dawn ===
The shaft is located near the corner of Marion and Oxford Streets in Charters Towers and consists of a fenced shaft with some small concrete slab foundations around the outside of the fence.

An altered landscaped in the form of a small plateau towards the Elizabeth Street side of the block with minor concrete foundations in the escarpment, could also be associated with the former mine site, possibly where the machinery and auxiliary buildings stood.

The shaft has a concrete cover and is in meed of some repair. A conical concrete footing structure lies on the ground inside the fence.

=== Brilliant Deeps ===
The shaft and foundations of surface infrastructure are on land in between Anne and Park Streets with access via Park Street. Of significance here is the shaft, with the remnants of a brick exhaust chimney on the rim of the shaft, and the large concrete and brick remains of machinery and building foundations. The shaft is open and well defined to a depth of 2,552 feet (778 m) and is enclosed by a 14 by 14 metres (46 ft × 46 ft) chain wire safety fence. The land surrounding the shaft is flat with no evidence of mullock heaps.

On the eastern side of the shaft is a new mine currently being worked by Charters Towers Gold Mines.

Housing surrounds the land on which the two mines sit.

=== Queen Cross Extended ===
The mineshaft and brick machinery foundations are located on vacant land at the top of Gladstone Road, at the junction of Arthur Jones Avenue. Access is gained by Deanes Street which manifests itself as a dirt track running through scrubby terrain behind a residential area. The site is not visible from the road but is accessible.

The shaft is wide with no evidence of a rock collar and does not appear to be of great depth. It is enclosed in a 14 by 14 metres (46 ft × 46 ft) chain wire safety fence. Directly opposite the shaft on the western side are the reasonably small foundations of the mine machinery constructed entirely of brick.

=== New Queen Central ===
The shaft and infrastructure remains are located on vacant land bounded in part by Sayers Street to the south, Norman Dungavell Dr to the east, and Cross Street to the west. The site lies nearest to the southeast corner of the lot and is accessed by Sayers Street. The shaft and remaining infrastructure are visible from the street.

The shaft is open and well defined behind a chain wire fence of 14 by 14 metres (46 ft × 46 ft). It is vertical to a depth of 1,900 feet (580 m). Two poppet head footings stand outside the fence on the north and south sides and minimal concrete foundations are in evidence on the other sides of the fence.

Opposite the shaft, towards Sayers Street, are the remains of brick and concrete machinery foundations, the largest structure being in the centre with a concrete slab on the eastern side and a smaller brick structure on the western side. Another concrete slab lies between the shaft and the foundations on the western side.

=== St George and Moonstone ===
The shaft is located on the southern side of Towers Hill with access via Chloride Street. The shaft lies at the intersection of upper Chloride Street and Percy Street but as both of these streets are unformed, access to the shaft is through open bush commencing from the private road to the Microwave Repeater Station. The shaft itself is open and well defined behind a chain wire safety fence (14 by 14 metres (46 ft × 46 ft)). The opening to the shaft is 6 by 4 metres (20 ft × 13 ft) wide and is filled with water to approximately 1.5 metres (4 ft 11 in) from the surface. Within the fence there are the remains of one of the mine's head frame leg footings, and outside the fence on the eastern side are some small mullock heaps. Remains of concrete foundations are found scattered around the shaft, but none are intact.

== Heritage listing ==
Charters Towers Mine Shafts were listed on the Queensland Heritage Register on 29 April 2003 having satisfied the following criteria.

The place is important in demonstrating the evolution or pattern of Queensland's history.

The mineshafts and their surrounding remains are important in demonstrating the development of the mining industry in Queensland. They reflect the immense gold mining activity that occurred in Charters Towers from 1872 to 1917, which saw it become the second largest city in Queensland during this time period and the third largest gold field in Australia. Gold from Charters Towers made a powerful contribution to the economic development of Queensland and the settlement patterns of North Queensland.

The place demonstrates rare, uncommon or endangered aspects of Queensland's cultural heritage.

From the hundreds of mines that were active in Charters Towers during its peak, these eight mineshafts and their surrounding remains are among the few tangible links left to the mining activity that was so prevalent in a town which had a substantial impact on Queensland's development.

The place has potential to yield information that will contribute to an understanding of Queensland's history.

The mine shafts, the remaining foundations of surface infrastructure and their surrounding cultural landscapes have the potential to yield information about the nature and scope of mining activity which dominated life in Charters Towers from 1872–1917. As a group, the mineshaft sites give an insight as to how the town of Charters Towers developed in the midst of massive gold mining operations.

The place is important in demonstrating the principal characteristics of a particular class of cultural places.

The eight mineshafts and the remaining infrastructures surrounding them are good examples of mines and vertical shafts developed for deep reef gold mining during the period.
