= The North Queensland Register =

Australian newspaper published until 1984

The North Queensland Register was a newspaper published in Charters Towers, Queensland, Australia from 15 June 1892 to 30 March 1905.

The paper was formerly known as the North Queensland Herald and Northern Mining Register. It was also nicknamed the Bushman's Bible.

== Digitisation ==
The paper has been digitised as part of the Australian Newspapers Digitisation Program of the National Library of Australia.
