= Venus State Battery =

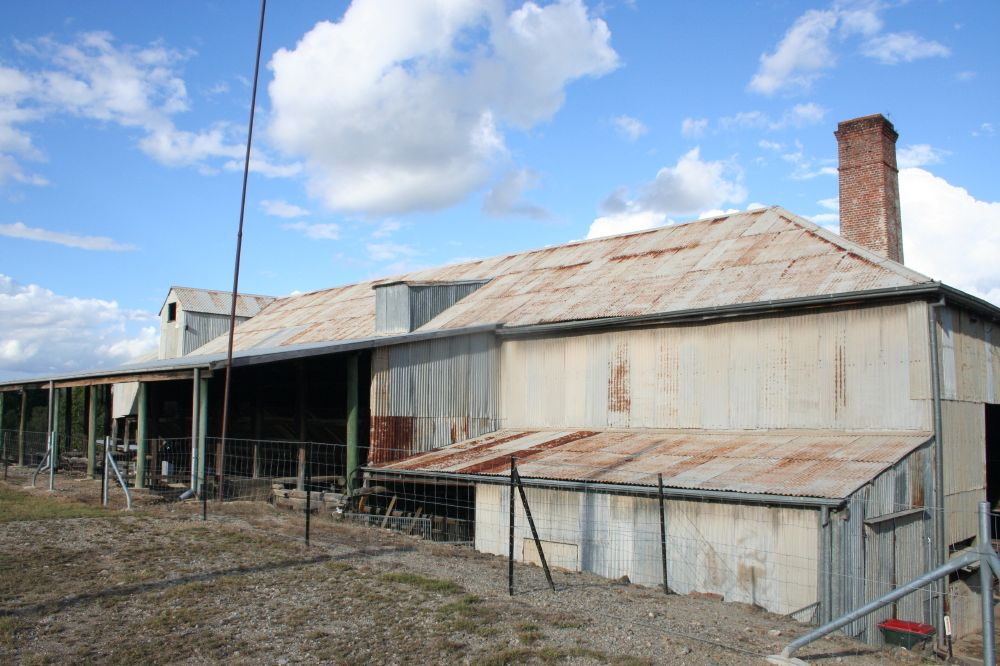
- Venus State Battery, 2011

- Location within Queensland Location within Australia
- 20.0859°S 146.2927°E
- Location: MacDonald Street, Millchester, Charters Towers, Charters Towers Region, Queensland, Australia

History
- Design period: 1870s–1890s (late 19th century)
- Built: 1872

Queensland Heritage Register
- Official name: Venus State Battery, Venus Gold Battery, Venus Mill
- Type: state heritage (built)
- Designated: 21 October 1992
- Reference no.: 600413
- Significant period: 1972–1950s (fabric); 1872–1919, 1919–1975 (historical)
- Significant components: shed – machinery, battery/crusher/stamper/jaw breaker, forge/blacksmithy, battery shed, chimney/chimney stack, residential accommodation – housing, tailings dump, machinery/plant/equipment – mining/mineral processing, office/s, weir, flue, toilet block/earth closet/water closet, weighbridge/weigh station, workshop, cyanide plant/cyanide vat

Venus State Battery is a heritage-listed stamper battery at MacDonald Street, Millchester, Charters Towers, Charters Towers Region, Queensland, Australia. It was built in 1872. It is also known as Venus Gold Battery and Venus Mill. It was added to the Queensland Heritage Register on 21 October 1992.

== History ==
The Venus was one of the earliest stamp batteries to be erected on the Charters Towers gold field as it was operating by July 1872. The first owners were Mr Edmund Harris Thornburgh Plant and Mr G. Jackson. Bricks were made on site for its construction. Initially the mill processed ore from a deep lead to the south-east of Millchester. When first erected the battery had only five head of stamps, but a second five was quickly added, then a third five in August 1872 and a fourth five in September 1873 making 20 head of stamps.

By 1897 the battery was described in The North Queensland Register as having 20 head of stamps, 80 berdans, one wheeler, four settlers, three buddles, all driven by a 30h.p. engine. By this period the mill was owned by Messrs Whitehead, D. Rolleston and J. Tilley and managed by Mr J. Barrett. It was one of seventeen then operating on the Charters Towers gold field. (The term "mill" was commonly used on the Charters Towers gold field in the nineteenth century to refer to a stamper or crushing battery, and later the term included all the concentrating and processing works at the place.)

Although the Charters Towers reefs were exhausted by 1917, the town remained the centre for small mining operations which were serviced by the Venus Battery, which was owned by the Queensland Government from 1919. Ore came from as far away as Chillagoe, Woolgar River and Iron Range on Cape York Peninsula.

There is reasonable evidence to indicate that the Venus battery changed quite dramatically some time before the Queensland Government assumed ownership in November 1919; local residents date this at 1907. The number of stamps increased from 20 to 35 and the building was altered to accommodate the increase. The Inspector of Mines on 10 July 1919 stated that: "...the mill is very well laid out for public crushing, each of the seven batteries being a complete unit in themselves from the feed hoppers to the sand pits." (By 1982, this could be said of only two batteries of five head of stamps).

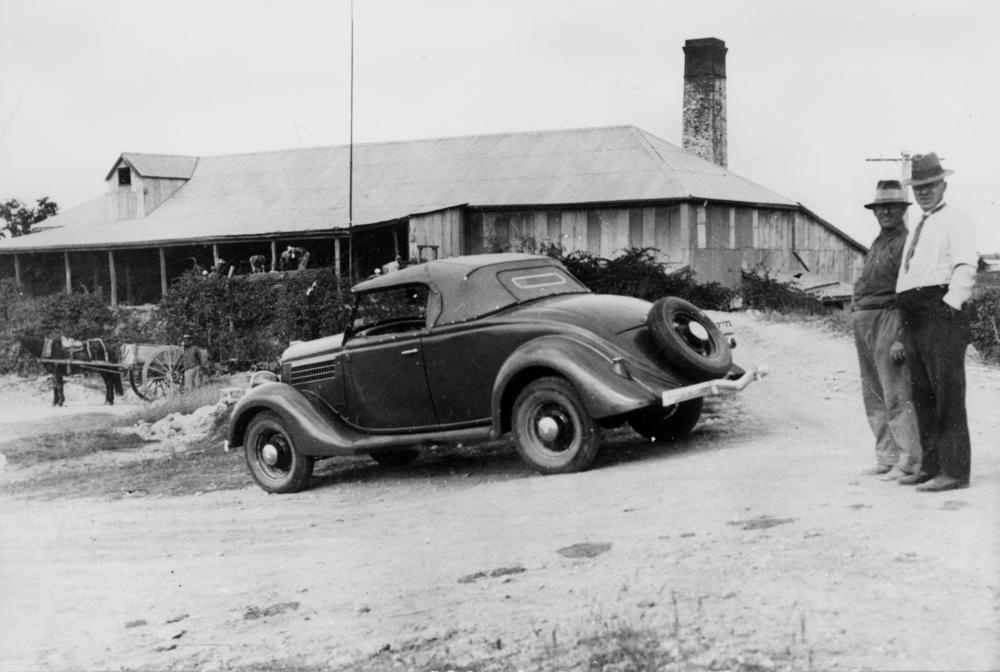
Venus State Mill, circa 1935

In 1935 only three batteries of stamps were working and No.2 boilers' brick foundation was crumbling. The Inspector of Mines stated that "a State Mill must be kept here even if it only averages 100 tons per month...the Venus has never yielded the Department any profit, in fact a steady loss on working expenses and no return on capital account". He proposed relocating the plant to the old Brilliant Extended Mill site alongside the railway station, which had advantages of a railway connection and cheaper power. However this did not happen.

In January 1941 a major flood damaged the weir and the Venus State Battery was to receive large scale repairs when crushing operations were suspended in 1942, presumably because of World War II disruptions. Electricity was installed in 1946 and the battery was updated and kept under repair. In May 1951 the cyanide plant was increased in size to its current configuration, although a new agitator was added in April 1954 to enable treatment of different quality ores from the Carrington mines at Liontown.

In December 1952 the roof above the old crusher had to be replaced because of white ant damage. In late 1958, five new stamps were ordered from the original suppliers, Walkers Brothers of Maryborough.

In 1971 the battery operated for only thirteen weeks. The Mines Department was concerned to preserve the historic value of the site and offered it to the Charters Towers City Council, who refused it. The National Trust of Queensland took over responsibility for the battery on 5 April 1975.

== Description ==
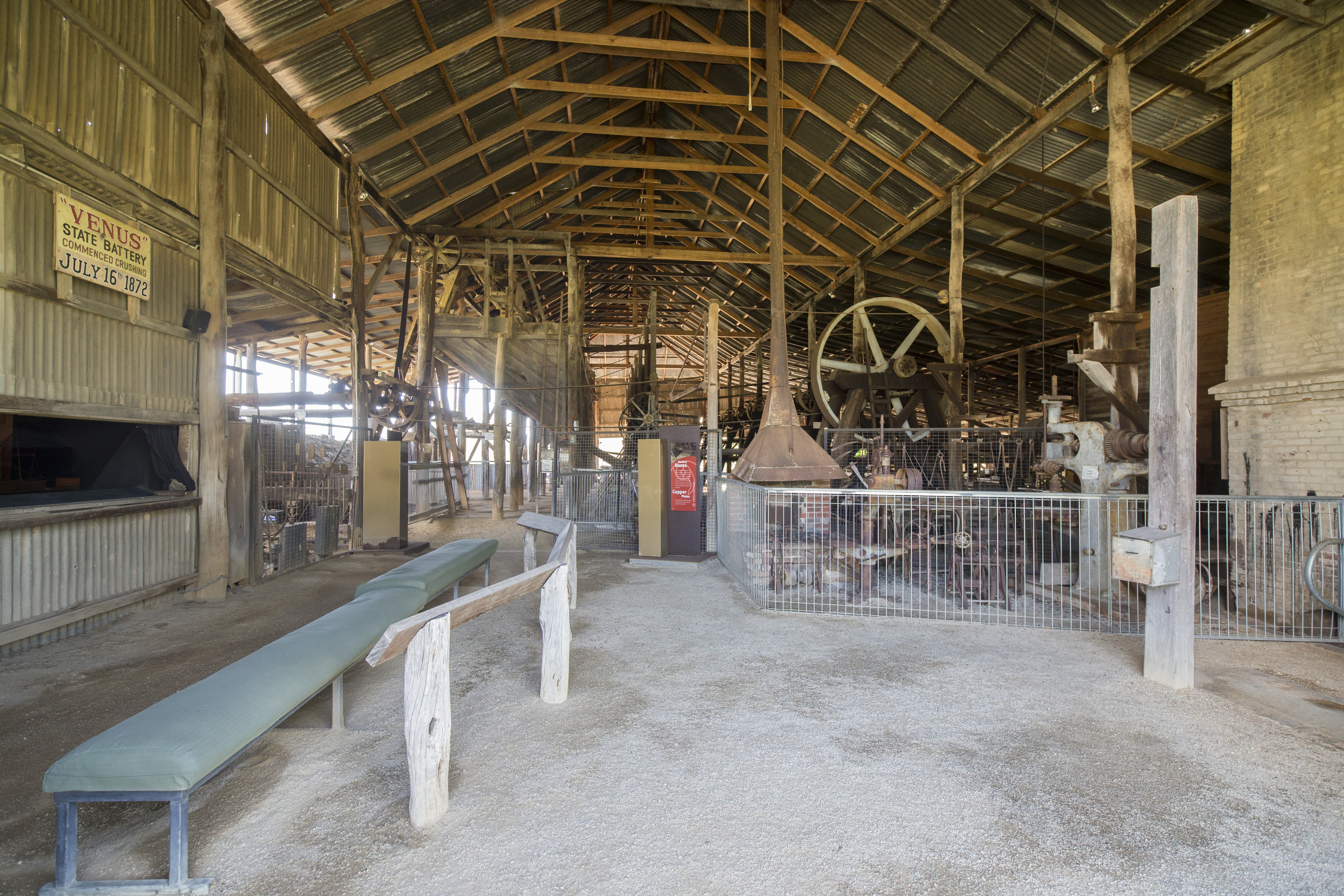
Interior of the Venus State Battery, 2015

A group of timber frame, corrugated iron clad buildings comprising an almost intact crushing and treatment plant. The battery shed contains four ore bins, a rockbreaker, four 5 head stamp batteries including three with timber blankets draining to three wilfley tables, and six berdan pans. The battery shed also houses a forge, workshop and office. Brick flues connect with the base of a square brick chimney, the boiler having been removed in favour of electric mains power in 1946.

Cyanide plant sheds immediately north of the battery shed house seven agitator vats, clarifier vats, solution tanks a Forward Down grinding pan, two motor sheds and a gold room. The place also contains three groups of concrete and brick rendered tailings tanks, a fibro clad assay office, corrugated iron toilet, and a weighbridge and corrugated iron office. A Cornish boiler has been adapted upside down as an elevated water tank. A concrete weir is located on Gladstone Creek. An abandoned house on Lot 1\MPH1536 New Street is adjacent to and associated with the battery.

Surviving plant includes:

- Forward Down grinding pan
- Five-head battery & frame, mortar box – Walkers Limited No 156
- Five-head battery & frame, mortar box – Walkers Limited No 168
- 2 Five-head batteries and frames – no brands
- 6 Berdan pans
- 7 Cyanide vats
- Rock breaker
- 3 Wilfley tables
- Weighbridge
- Cornish boiler (converted to an elevated water tank)

== Heritage listing ==
Venus State Battery was listed on the Queensland Heritage Register on 21 October 1992 having satisfied the following criteria.

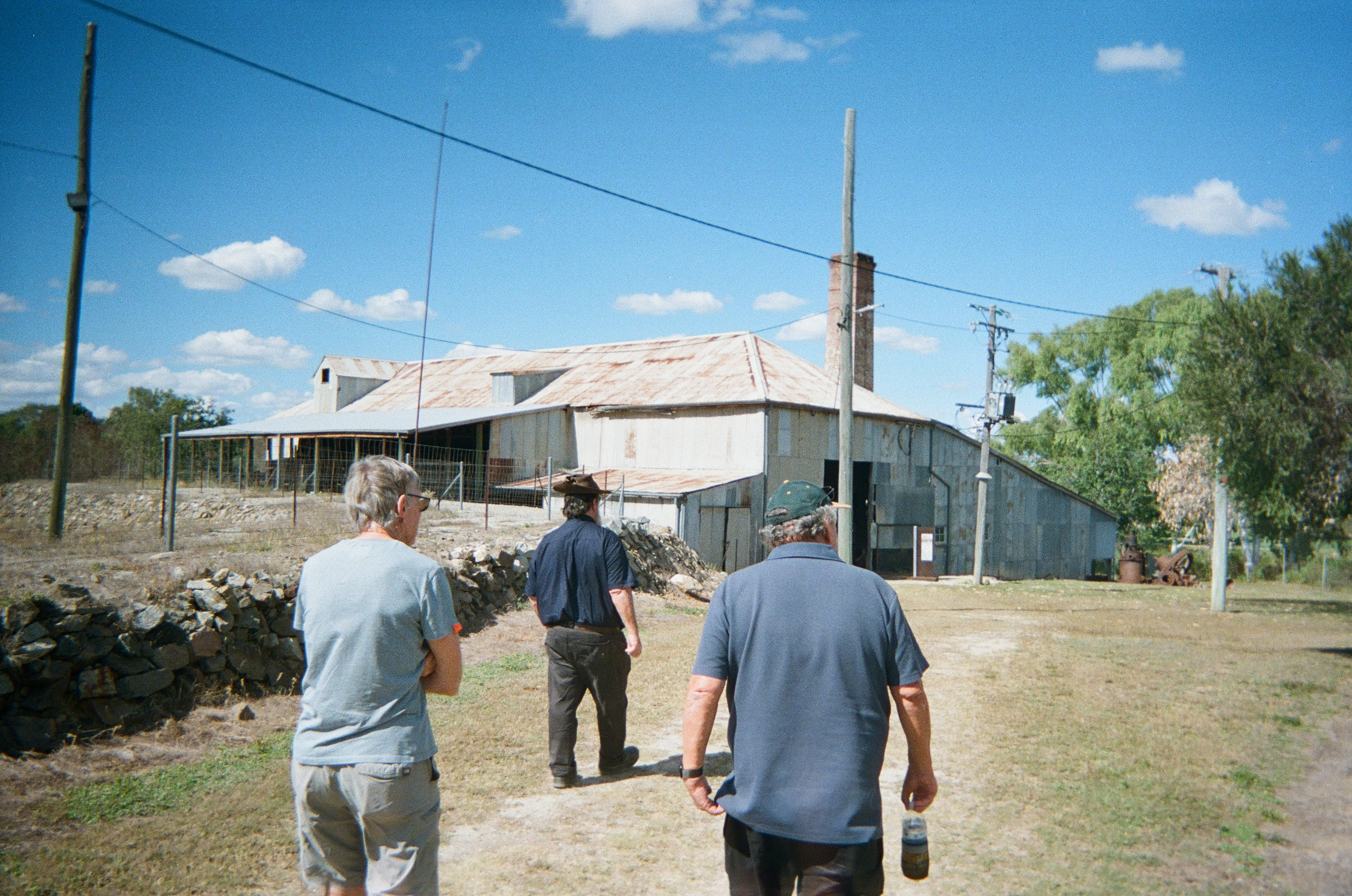
Visitors on a guided tour of the battery in 2025

The place is important in demonstrating the evolution or pattern of Queensland's history.

The Venus State Battery is important in demonstrating the evolution of Queensland's mining history. It is the earliest surviving battery in Queensland having been first constructed in 1872 although the machinery and power plant has been reconstructed at least four times.

The place demonstrates rare, uncommon or endangered aspects of Queensland's cultural heritage.

The Venus State Battery is unique as the only intact battery and cyanide plant in the Charters Towers Mining District. The grouping of battery, cyanide plant, assay office, weighbridge, weir and cottage is a unique grouping in Queensland. The place contains rare brick chimneys and the largest number of stamps (20) of all surviving batteries in Queensland. Its intactness of machinery and plant layout is rare in Queensland and Australian mining heritage and its history of continuing use, as an example of State Enterprise in the 1920s maintained for the benefit of small miners in North Queensland, has potential to yield information that will further contribute to an understanding of the Queenslands's social and economic history.

The place has potential to yield information that will contribute to an understanding of Queensland's history.

Its intactness of machinery and plant layout is rare in Queensland and Australian mining heritage and its history of continuing use, as an example of State Enterprise in the 1920s maintained for the benefit of small miners in North Queensland, has potential to yield information that will further contribute to an understanding of the Queenslands's social and economic history.

The place is important in demonstrating the principal characteristics of a particular class of cultural places.

The Venus State Battery is important in demonstrating the principal characteristics of a crushing, concentrating and cyaniding mill and its setting on the banks of Gladstone Creek in the once flourishing suburb of Millchester exhibits aesthetic characteristics that are valued by sections of the community.

The place is important because of its aesthetic significance.

The Venus State Battery is important in demonstrating the principal characteristics of a crushing, concentrating and cyaniding mill and its setting on the banks of Gladstone Creek in the once flourishing suburb of Millchester exhibits aesthetic characteristics that are valued by sections of the community.

The place has a strong or special association with a particular community or cultural group for social, cultural or spiritual reasons.

The survival and conservation of the Venus State Battery is due to its social and economic value for and strong association with the local mining community and the National Trust of Queensland.
