= Bank of New South Wales building, Charters Towers =

Heritage listed building in Queensland, Australia

Bank of New South Wales, Charters Towers
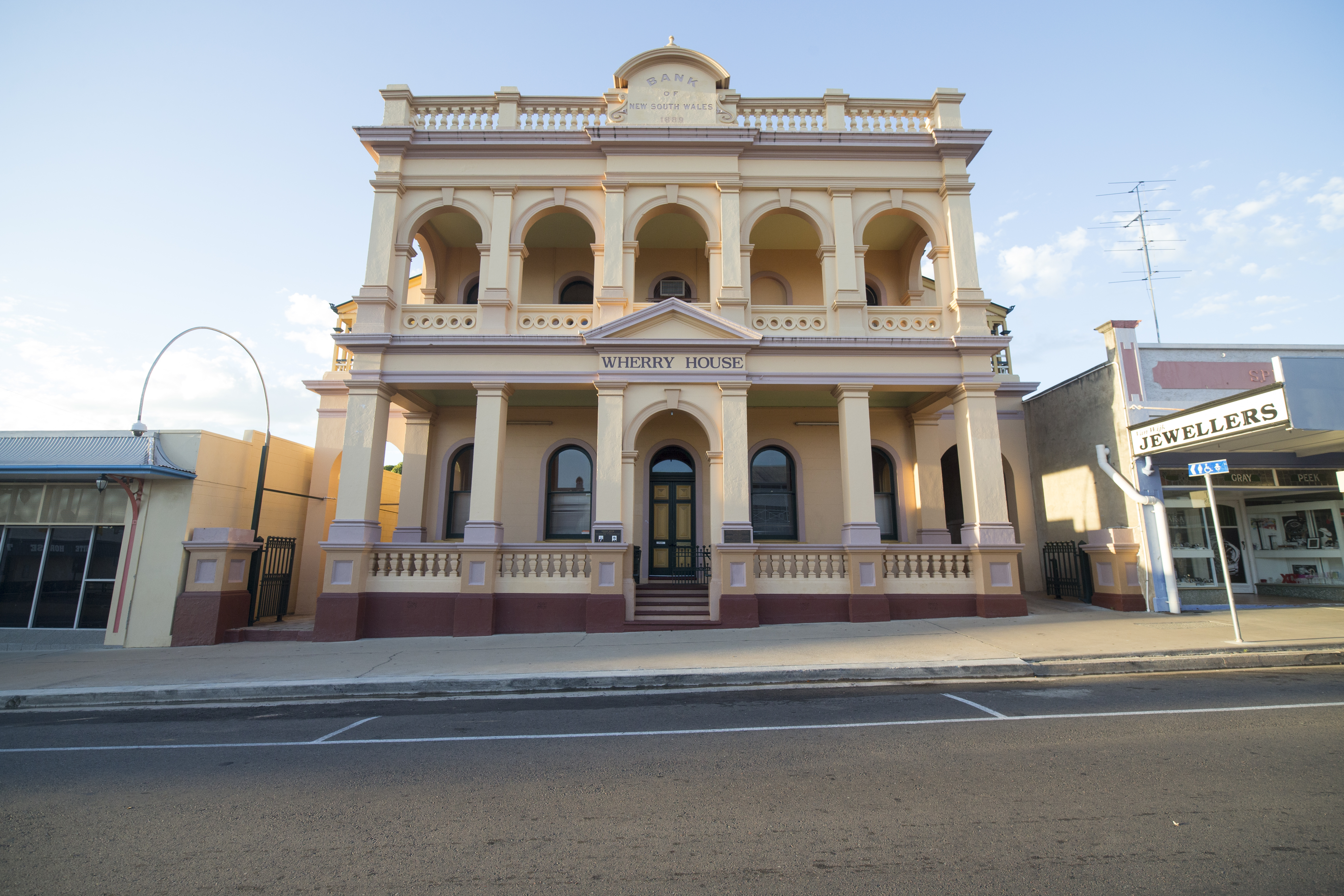
- Bank of New South Wales (now Wherry House), 2015

- Location within Queensland Location within Australia
- 20.0765°S 146.2581°E
- Location: 34–36 Gill Street, Charters Towers City, Charters Towers, Charters Towers Region, Queensland, Australia

History
- Design period: 1870s–1890s (late 19th century)
- Built: 1889

Site notes
- Architect: Eyre & Munro
- Architectural style: Classicism

Queensland Heritage Register
- Official name: Bank of New South Wales (former)
- Type: state heritage
- Designated: 9 November 2012
- Reference no.: 602804
- Significant components: banking chamber, strong room, banking chamber, residential accommodation – manager's house/quarters, bank
- Builders: Kelleher

Bank of New South Wales is a heritage-listed former bank building at 34–36 Gill Street, Charters Towers City, Charters Towers, Charters Towers Region, Queensland, Australia. It was designed by Eyre & Munro and built in 1889 by Kelleher. It is also known as Wherry House. It was added to the Queensland Heritage Register on 9 November 2012.

== History ==
The former Bank of New South Wales building was built in Gill Street, Charters Towers in 1889, replacing a number of earlier timber bank buildings on other sites in both Charters Towers and nearby Millchester. This two-storey masonry building addressing Gill Street also has a number of additions to the rear which demonstrate the evolution of the banking industry in the town over time. It complements other significant bank buildings in nearby Mosman Street, including the former Australian Bank of Commerce, now The World Theatre, and the former Queensland National Bank building which later served as the City Hall.

Charters Towers' gold was first discovered in December 1871, by an Aboriginal boy named Jupiter who tended the horses for prospectors Hugh Mosman, George Clarke and John Fraser. A storm frightened the horses into a gap in the hills, and while retrieving them, Jupiter found a rich vein of gold laden quartz. Mosman travelled to Ravenswood in early January 1872 to register the claim which he named Charters Towers, honouring the Gold Commissioner for the Broughton gold fields. By March 1872, Commissioner Charters had issued 25 prospecting area permits in the vicinity of Mosman's claim, and the rush began.

The earliest settlement grew around diggings at the confluence of Buchanan's Gully and Gladstone Creek and was known as Millchester. About 2 miles (3.2 km) north-west of Millchester, another settlement evolved which became Charters Towers. It included a number of stores, hotels and a butcher shop along a track that was to become Mosman Street. The population of Charters Towers was reputedly 3000 by August 1872. There was rivalry between the two settlements, particularly after the courthouse was erected at Millchester in 1873.

In the meantime, it had become evident that the procurement of gold from the deep seams of Charter Towers required substantial machinery to crush quartz and sink shafts. This required working capital to finance machinery and to pay the wages of workers employed on these time-consuming processes. The Queensland Gold Fields Act 1874 and Gold Mining Companies Act 1875 allowed for combinations of leases, claims and syndicates in order to work their leases at great depths. The legislation also underpinned the establishment of permanent settlement which would attract capital investment to the field. The influx of money and the resultant yield of gold were reflected in the growth of the township and the establishment of banks, mining companies and mining agencies and exchanges. Two banking companies, the Australian Joint Stock Bank and the Bank of New South Wales established offices on the goldfields by July 1872, only six months after the registration of the first claims.

The Bank of New South Wales was the first bank established in Australia (February 1817) but it was restricted to trading in Sydney until 1850. After restructuring, it opened its first branch outside Sydney, in Brisbane, on 14 November 1850, also being the first bank established in Queensland. It continued to expand rapidly with the rush of gold discoveries in New South Wales and Victoria. The bank set up agencies and gold-buying agents at every new mining venture in order to spread its network and consolidate its position. Bank officers were urged on by their superiors to be the first to a new location to set up a gold-buying agency. By 1861 the Bank of NSW had grown from a single Sydney office to a network of 37 branches in Australia and New Zealand.

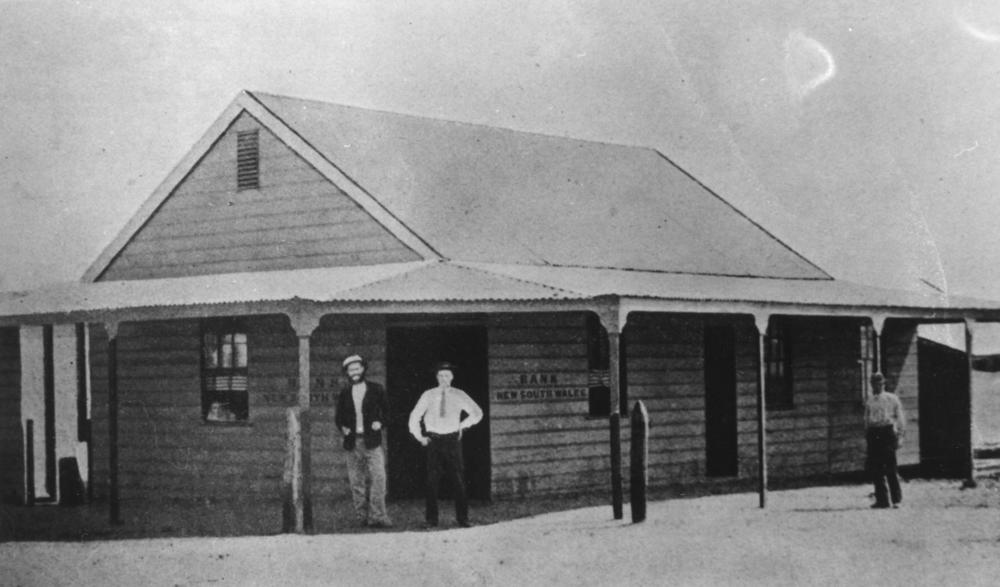
Earlier timber building of the Bank of New South Wales in Charters Towers, circa 1875

The expansion of the Bank of NSW into North Queensland was driven by Robert Towns, one of its directors. Bank establishment followed both pastoral development and mineral discoveries. Port Denison, established to serve pastoralists, became the municipality of Bowen in 1863. By 1864 there was Bowen branch of the Bank of NSW, followed by one in Townsville in March 1866, where Towns and his partner John Melton Black had established a boiling down works. Another branch opened on the Ravenswood goldfields in 1870, one at Cardwell, (the terminus for the gold escort) in 1871 and in Charters Towers and Georgetown in 1872. The Cooktown branch, servicing the Palmer River fields opened in 1876, then Thornborough in 1877 on the Hodgkinson goldfields, followed by Cairns and Port Douglas. The Charters Towers Bank of NSW had opened only two days after the Australian Joint Stock Bank, which had opened on 2 July 1872. Then in October 1872, both banks relocated to nearby Millchester.

In Millchester, land on the northern corner of Jardine and Macdonald Streets was formally transferred to the Bank of NSW in April 1875, but the actual sale is likely to have occurred prior to the title documentation. The Joint Stock Bank owned land opposite in Macdonald Street, and the Queensland National Bank opened in 1873 adjacent. Then in July 1874, a cottage was reported to have been relocated to Mosman Street, Charters Towers, to be used as an agency of the Bank of NSW. Presumably the main branch remained in Millchester. At the time Charters Towers was described as: "solidifying rapidly and is giving undeniable proof that it means to stand. New shops and stores are going up. Buildings are being renovated and painted..."

Charters Towers soon dominated. A town survey was undertaken in November 1874, and marked out allotments in a "T" formation, with the mines and provision stores of Mosman Street on one axis, and the road to Millchester marked by Gill Street on the other. In January 1876, the Bank of NSW was relocated to Charters Towers, with Millchester becoming the agency office. This relocation was touted by the Northern Miner newspaper, as "the beginning of the end" for Millchester. Charters Towers was declared a municipality in 1877 encompassing 1 square mile (2.6 km^{2}) centred on Mosman Street. It included new churches, the Oddfellows and Good Templar Lodges, and 21 hotels and 57 shops. The Bank of NSW moved into new premises in March 1877, described as a five roomed banking house, bringing solidarity to the top end of Mosman Street.

The wealth of the Charters Towers goldfields grew in the following years, particularly following the 1886 Colonial and Indian Exhibition in London where specimens of Charters Towers Gold were featured. Almost immediately English investors seized the opportunity to be part of the Charters Towers gold riches. Mining companies were formed, managed by Charters Towers' mining agents and share-brokers, and while some shares were held by English interests, many local people prospered through their investments, which then led to an expansion of banking facilities and mining exchanges. Banks and gold buyers purchased the gold, minted it into sovereigns in Australia and England, which were held in the vaults of banks in Melbourne, London, Berlin, and New York and then shipped to pay international debt. According to the Northern Miner newspaper, there were five banks in Gill Street in mid 1887: the Bank of NSW, Bank of Australasia, London Chartered Bank, Union and Royal Banks. The Queensland National Bank and the Australian Joint Stock Bank remained in Mosman Street.

The Bank of NSW gradually improved banking facilities during the 1880s when many new branches opened in Queensland. Most directors were keen for bank premises in country towns to emphasise dignity, size and solidity in the design of their buildings demonstrating the bank's capacity to survive and consolidate. Consequently, well known architects were employed to design bank buildings in New South Wales, and throughout Australia and New Zealand.

This was the case in Charters Towers. The Bank of NSW purchased an allotment in February 1887, diagonally opposite the post office in Gill Street, on which to erect a new substantial brick building. Architects Eyre and Munro called for tenders in the local newspaper in April 1888. The firm had offices in Townsville and Charters Towers. The Charters Towers office was run by William Henry Allan Munro, who had been previously employed in Townsville by architects and builders Rooney Brothers. After winning a competition for the design of the Queensland Hotel, he was taken into partnership with Walter Morris Eyre. In 1887 he became the junior partner, managing the Charters Towers office. Eyre, brother-in-law of architect FDG Stanley, had managed Stanley's Maryborough office between 1882 and 1885 before relocating to Townsville, where he supervised the construction of the Bank of NSW building in Flinders Street. The Eyre and Munro partnership designed many north Queensland buildings including the 1889 Holy Trinity Church of England in Herberton, the 1890 Bank of North Queensland in Cooktown, the 1890–1 Townsville School of Arts, and the 1892 Burns Philp Building, later part of Bartlam's Store in Charters Towers (now Zara Clark Museum). They also designed the building on the corner of Deane and Gill Streets for auctioneers Ackers, Wilson, Ayton and Ryan, built in 1888 which later housed the Royal Bank of Queensland.

Construction of the new bank was by contractor Mr Kelleher under the supervision of Eyre and Munro. It opened for business on Monday 13 May 1889, and was described as "handsome and very pleasing, an imposing structure, superior to anything north of Brisbane" and overshadowing the adjacent Bank of Australasia (no longer extant). While the Northern Miner newspaper reported the cost at £9,000, the bank's archives indicated £6,040. The new building was seen as the way forward in both structure and location. The inclusion of a commodious manager's private apartment was usual for regional banks.

On the ground floor the building comprised banking chamber, fitted handsomely in polished cedar, the upper part of the various partitions being in ornamental ground glass...ample room for the public in front of the counter for the transaction of business, and a table... placed there for the accommodation of those who may desire to fill in deposit slips, requisitions for drafts, &c; a counter...14 ft long by 4ft 6 in [4.2 x 1.4m] wide, with the bill department on the right, and the exchange clerks' office on the left; ledger desks...placed at the back of the counter. To the left of the main entrance to the public hall is the manager's room, ...and opening out of that is the accountant's office... which has a raised floor, so that the official, by simply standing up, can get a good view of all that is going on. There is a passage leading from the manager's room to the dining-room, which, with the exception of the kitchen and servants' offices is the only one of the private apartments on the ground floor. At the rear of the ledger-desks are the strong room (fireproof), a lavatory and a stationery-room. Leaving the dining-room, we come to the private hall, which is approached from the passage to the left of the building. The upper floor is reached by a staircase from this hall...and contains a handsome drawing room...communicating by folding doors with another large room...which will be used by Mr Beattie for his own bedroom. There are three other bedrooms and a dressing room, all of large dimensions, with linen closet and a bathroom. The upper part of the building has a balcony running around three sides...and the internal passages are all proportionately spacious. The servants' quarters on the ground floor comprise kitchen, pantry, wash-house and sleeping apartment, and are furnished with the usual appurtenances for cooking and washing. Stabling has yet to be erected. Gas is laid on in every room and provision is made: for the Burdekin water supply when that scheme is complete. In the meantime there are three 1000 gallon [45 litres] tanks all full. The chimney-pieces and other fittings are in cedar, and are in excellent taste. All the rooms are ceiled, with mouldings, &c., of elegant design, and ventilation and drainage have been specially attended to.'

An economic downturn occurred in 1888, during the construction of the bank, due to a decrease in overseas investment and a continuing drought which led to the closure of crushing machines due to lack of water. The slump was short-lived after the development of the Brilliant Reef, which when mined to a depth of 3,000 feet (910 m), became the biggest producer in the field.

Charters Towers was at its economic peak in the late 19th century. According to Government Geologist Robert Logan Jack, Charters Towers was the third largest gold producing area in Australia, after Ballarat and Sandhurst (Bendigo). Many new buildings were completed in this period in Charters Towers. The "T" junction of Mosman and Gill Streets became the financial district of Charters Towers. For one block to the east, north, and south were eight banks, the post and telegraph office, two assaying offices, and four solicitor's offices. Share-brokers occupied the Royal Arcade, and other offices were located in Mosman and Bow Streets. The Royal Arcade was built in 1888 for Alexander Malcolm and by 1890 the Stock Exchange operated from the building. Other significant buildings of this era include the 1887–92 Masonic Lodge and the 1892 Post Office (Commonwealth Heritage List 105523). Banks of this era include the 1881 (lowset timber) Bank of Australasia, the London Chartered Bank (which purchased the two-storey masonry building from local builder Hugh Ross in 1887), the former Australian Joint Stock Bank (later the Australian Bank of Commerce) and the Queensland National (QN) Bank, both designed by FDG Stanley and both built in 1891. The Union Bank then occupied the former QN Bank premises in Mosman Street. All of these buildings remain, apart from the Bank of Australasia. The Bank of NSW was considered the first financial institution to erect premises worthy of the town and the business conducted there. The North Queensland Register claimed it was the largest banking institution in Australasia in the 1890s.

The banking crisis of 1893, when the Queensland National Bank and the Australian Joint Stock Bank, both suspended trading, led to an increase in business for the Bank of NSW in Charters Towers, when successful mining companies transferred their accounts. At that time there were eight banking businesses operating in Charters Towers; the Australian Joint Stock Bank, Bank of Australasia, Bank of NSW, Bank of North Queensland, London Chartered Bank, Queensland National Bank, Royal Bank and the Union Bank, and all were still operating after the crisis had passed.

In 1899, Charters Towers was the second most important city in Queensland with a population of over 26,000, and an internationally noted goldfield. The gold yield for the state rose dramatically following the development of the Brilliant Reef, and in 1891, rose from 123,000 ounces (3,500,000 g) to 218,000 ounces (6,200,000 g). It reached its all-time peak of 319,572 ounces (9,059,700 g), yielding over £2,000,000 by 1899. Gold production contributed between 21.61 and 35.53 percent of Queensland's export income during the 1880s and 1890s. These enormous amounts of gold were purchased by banks, which played a vital role in this process of wealth creation and distribution.

Gold production had been the mainstay of the Queensland mining sector in the 1890s, amounting to 85 per cent to 92.8 per cent of mining production during the decade. Apart from a brief spike in production at Mount Morgan in 1888–1889, Charters Towers consistently out-produced the other major gold mining areas of Ravenswood, Gympie and Mount Morgan between 1880 and 1913. While Gympie peaked between 1901 and 1906, generally figures for all centres declined in the early 20th century. Charters Towers' production of 96,046 ounces (2,722,900 g) in 1912, fell to 42,777 ounces (1,212,700 g) in 1916 and was reduced to 8,095 ounces (229,500 g) by 1919.

Despite Charters Towers being declared a city in 1909, the downturn in mining from 1914 and its virtual cessation by 1917 contributed to a steady decrease in population during this time. A town that had boasted a population of 25,000 in 1900, when it was the second largest in Queensland, was reduced to just 13,000 by the end of World War I (WWI). Between 1914 and 1918 more than 900 homes and business premises were removed from Charters Towers. Many were dismantled and transported by train to Townsville or Ayr where they were re-erected. Others were relocated to various places in Western Queensland. Nevertheless, banking institutions remained in town to service the regional rural economy and included the Bank of NSW, Bank of Australasia, London Chartered Bank, Queensland National Bank, Union Bank and the Bank of Commerce in the early 1920s. The Bank of NSW took over the Western Australian Bank in 1927, and then absorbed the Australian Bank of Commerce in 1931.

The Bank of NSW occupied the building in Gill Street until 1970 and during this time a number of repairs and small modifications were made. Renovations were undertaken in 1910 included plastering, painting and general repairs, with further unidentified alterations occurring in 1921 and 1940. A post-1900 photograph of the rear of the bank shows rendering to the face-brick walls of the bank core and service wing; lattice panels fixed to the western verandahs of the manager's apartment and service wing; horizontal battens on the wash house and stables and a lavatory in the far south- western corner. It is likely that the female toilets attached to the northern western corner of the bank were built during WWI when women were employed to make up for the shortfall of men. Following the 1931 merger with the Australian Bank of Commerce, the amalgamated business was carried on in the Bank of New South Wales premises in Gill Street. The former Bank of Commerce building (originally the Joint Stock Bank) was used as accommodation for bank officers. It was sold in 1937.

The Charters Towers Bank of NSW played an important role in the Pacific Campaign of World War II, as the New Guinean Bank of NSW branches in the towns of Wau, Samarai, Rabaul and Port Moresby were successively evacuated in January and early February 1942, due to bombing or threat of bombing. The transportable business effects including records, cash and bullion were taken by boat to Townsville, and a custodian branch was set up in Charters Towers, while the reconstruction of the business was undertaken in Brisbane.

The Charters Towers City Council acquired the Queensland National Bank building in 1949 and relocated its administrative operations there. The building was then known as the Charters Towers Town Hall. A library was established in the old town hall building. The Charters Towers City Council acquired the former Bank of Commerce (AJS Bank) in 1992 and converted it into The World Theatre.

In 1967 a property exchange was made with the Charters Towers City Council, whereby the Bank of NSW acquired the old town hall site owned by the council. The old timber Town Hall was demolished in August 1968. The bank continued to occupy its original building during the construction of a new building on this site, which opened on 16 March 1970. The Bank of NSW acquired the Victorian-based Commercial Bank of Australia Ltd in 1982 and then changed its name to Westpac, reflecting the Western Pacific region in which it now operated.

From 1982, the former Bank of NSW building was used as the council library and child care centre. The property was formally transferred to the Council in 1984. The council erected women's toilets to the rear of the western side of the building sometime prior to 1980. During the 1980s a restaurant occupied the first floor of the building. In the 1990s it housed the offices of Skill West and Skill Share, as well as school support services provided by Education Queensland. The semi-detached building at the rear has undergone a number of renovations over time. The library was relocated in 2003 and the day care centre ceased operation. The former Bank of NSW building has had a number of tenants since that time including a real estate agent and a Bendigo Bank Agency. The Australian Association of Distance Education Schools utilised space on the first floor for training purposes in the 2000s, however it has been vacant since 2010. The building was renamed Wherry House in 2006 to honour a former mayor Paul Wherry and his wife Molly who served the city from 1952 to 1964. Plaques commemorating their community work were installed in the building in November 2006.

== Description ==
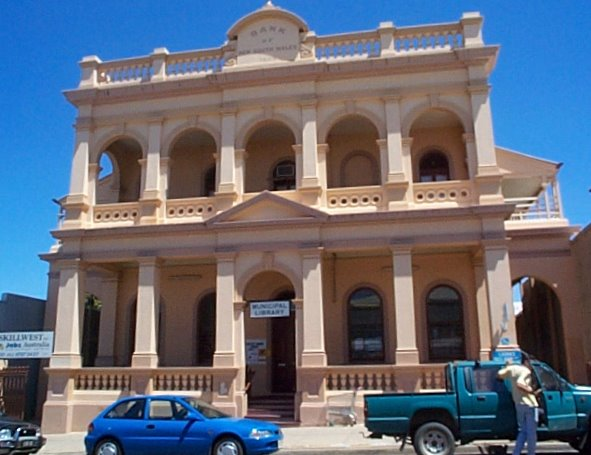
In use as Charters Tower's Library, 2002

The former Bank of New South Wales is a substantial building in the heart of the commercial district of Charters Towers and is an important element in a largely late 19th century townscape. Facing north, the bank is located on Gill Street where it rises to meet Mosman Street. The bank is a dominant element in its immediate setting amidst smaller, less pretentious buildings and has a visual relationship with other former banks and important civic buildings in scale and style, including Charters Towers Post Office and the former Queensland National Bank (later the City Hall).

The rendered brick building with timber framed floors and large hipped roof clad in corrugated metal sheeting has an elaborate, classically detailed two-storey masonry arcade fronting Gill Street. Behind, timber verandahs on the east and west sides of the first floor shelter the core of the building and provide access lanes at ground level to the rear of the site.

The building comprises the former bank on the ground floor approached from Gill Street; the former residence on the first floor accessed from the eastern lane, and an attached single-storey service wing at the rear with access from Powell Lane to the south. The former Bank of New South Wales retains a large proportion of its early fabric and displays a high standard of craftsmanship and detail. The principal interior spaces are spacious and highly decorative, contrasting with the simplicity and practicality of the service spaces. Notable features include the generous ceiling heights, substantial and handsomely detailed cedar joinery, ventilated plaster cornices and ceiling roses and hand-pressed brick walls and barrel-vaulted ceiling in the strong room.

The original layout of the building is clearly discernible. Approached from the footpath, the centred main entrance opens from the arcade into the spacious banking chamber. The manager's office and accountant's alcove are located to the left along its eastern side and strong room, toilet and stationery room along the rear to the south. A door in the rear of the western wall leads out to the lane. The dining room is located in the south-east corner. Adjacent, at rear of the bank, is an impressive stair hall which provides separate external access to the first floor manager's apartment together with through access from the service wing to the dining room. There is a storage room under the stair and linen store on the first floor. Opening off the stair hall, the apartment has an L-shaped hall leading to the western verandah where there are bathrooms clad with chamferboards located on the south-western corner. Two large principal rooms across the front (originally the drawing room and principal bedroom) and four smaller rooms (dressing room and three bedrooms) toward the rear open off the hall. The former, connected by bi-folding doors, have substantial joinery and all rooms opening onto the front and side verandahs have French doors.

Attached by a secondary, timber-framed stair hall to the rear of the apartment stair hall is a single-storey service wing. A rendered brick building with hipped roof clad in corrugated metal sheeting, it comprises two rooms (originally a servant's bedroom and kitchen) separated by a pantry with verandahs on its eastern and western sides. A brick chimney is located in the south east corner of the kitchen which has a coved ceiling lined with flat sheeting and at the rear of the kitchen is a bathroom housed in a timber-framed, skillion roofed structure. The stair from the service wing to the mid-level landing of the main stair has been removed.

Public toilets are located beside the former banking chamber at the end of the western side lane. One is a detached structure of concrete blocks that is not of cultural heritage significance. The other is a timber-framed lean-to. The interior fittings and fixtures are not of cultural heritage significance. The rear yard is surfaced with concrete and contains a number of structures including steel framed carports (that are not of cultural heritage significance) and a timber-framed garage with flat sheet walls and a gabled roof of corrugated metal sheeting.

== Heritage listing ==
The former Bank of New South Wales building was listed on the Queensland Heritage Register on 9 November 2012 having satisfied the following criteria.

The place is important in demonstrating the evolution or pattern of Queensland's history.

The Bank of New South Wales in Charters Towers is important in demonstrating the history of gold mining, a major contributor to Queensland's wealth. Built in 1889, the bank symbolises the vital need for the provision of financial services to the burgeoning deep reef gold mining industry of Charters Towers, the largest gold producer in Queensland and the third largest in Australia by the 1890s.

It contributes significantly to our understanding of the important operations of the bank, the first banking institution in Australia, and the first in Queensland, which expanded its interests in north Queensland concurrently with the growth of pastoralism and mining from the 1860s. It was the second banking organisation to establish a branch on the Charters Towers gold field, providing financial services since 1872.

The 1889 Bank of New South Wales was the first substantial two-storey masonry bank building in Charters Towers, and served as bank and managers' residence for over 80 years. It symbolises the desire of bank management to have buildings in regional towns demonstrating the dignity, size and solidity of the bank's wealth and prosperity in a prime location in the business centre of town.

The place is important in demonstrating the principal characteristics of a particular class of cultural places.

Designed by prominent North Queensland architects Eyre and Munro, the bank building is an important example of their major commercial work. Highly intact, it is an exceptional demonstration of a substantial, regional 19th century bank - its two-storey masonry construction; elaborate classical styling make it a prominent element in the streetscape of the central business district and its large elaborate banking chamber; strong room; offices; discreet, commodious manager's residence; and semi-detached service wing are key features. The building retains its original layout illustrating the interrelation between the functions of the rooms.

The place is important because of its aesthetic significance.

The bank building is important for its expressive attributes, conveying the concept of financial stability and permanence sought by financial institutions of this era through its imposing, classically detailed arcaded facade. Finely composed, it is a major contributor to the streetscape and one of a suite of large masonry bank buildings in the central business district in Charters Towers, a largely intact and important nineteenth century gold era town.

It is notable for the variety of high quality decorative treatments and interior joinery illustrating the hierarchy of the former functions within the building and demonstrating the tastes of the nineteenth century.
