= Charters Towers Stock Exchange Arcade =

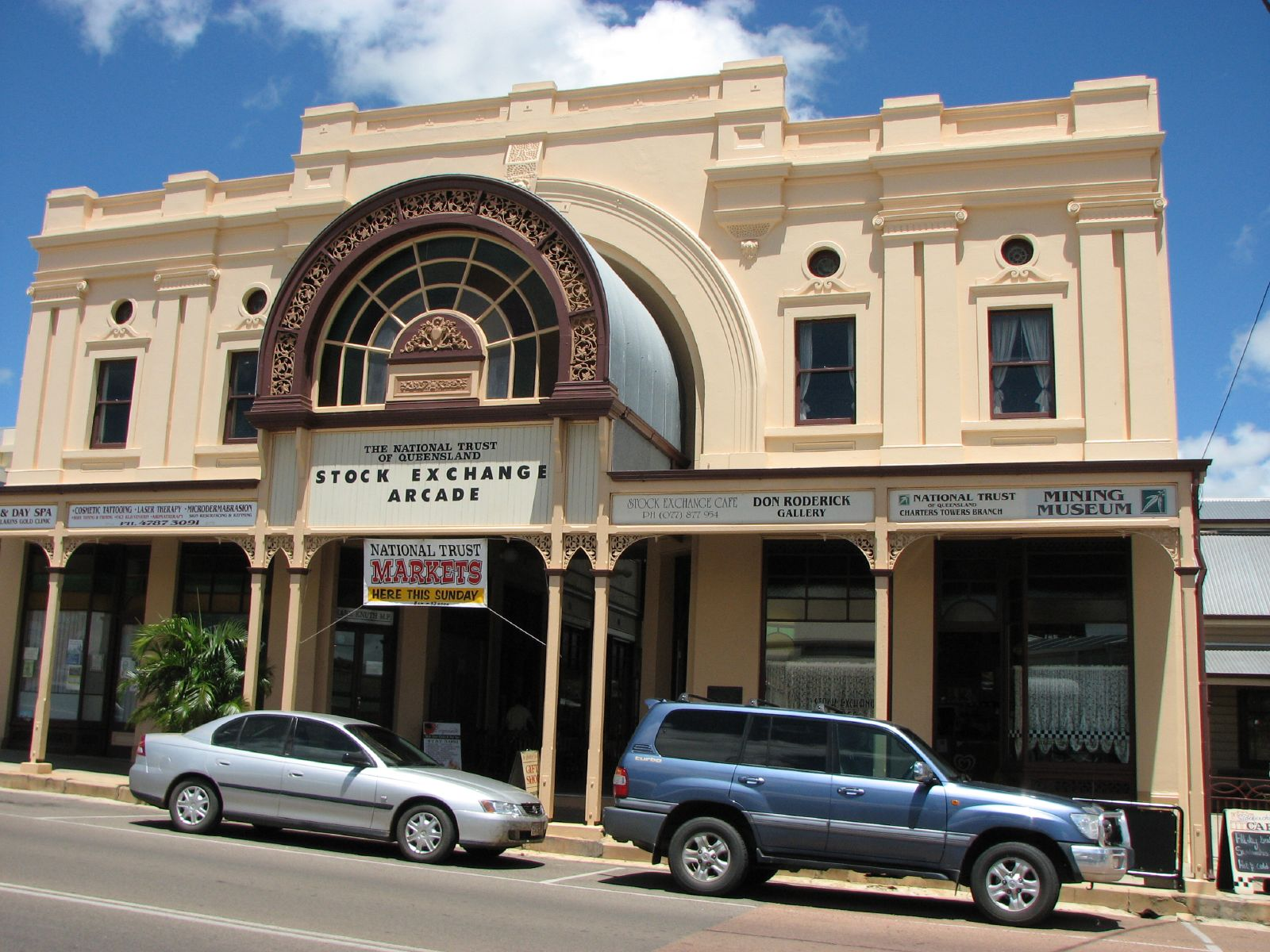
- Stock Exchange Arcade

- Location within Queensland
- 20.0759°S 146.2567°E
- Location: 76 Mosman Street, Charters Towers City, Charters Towers, Charters Towers Region, Queensland, Australia

History
- Design period: 1870s–1890s (late 19th century)
- Built: 1888–1888
- Built for: Malcolm Alexander

Site notes
- Architect: Mark Cooper Day

Queensland Heritage Register
- Official name: Stock Exchange Arcade, Royal Arcade
- Type: state heritage (built)
- Designated: 21 October 1992
- Reference no.: 600406
- Significant period: 1880s (fabric); 1888–ongoing, 1890–c. 1916 (historical uses)
- Significant components: assay office, shop/s, gate – entrance, office/s, fence/wall – perimeter
- Builders: Sandbrook Brothers

Charters Towers Stock Exchange Arcade is a heritage-listed shopping arcade at 76 Mosman Street, Charters Towers City, Charters Towers, Charters Towers Region in Queensland, Australia. It was designed by the Sydney architect Mark Cooper Day and built in 1888 by Sandbrook Brothers of Sydney. It was originally known as the Royal Arcade. It was added to the Queensland Heritage Register on 21 October 1992.

It was originally designed for the local civic leader Alexander Malcolm and was connected to the rest of the world via telegraph. It operated until 1916, when it had to be shut down due to the rapidly diminishing returns from the gold mines and population.

== History ==
The Stock Exchange Arcade was built in 1888 to the design of Sydney architect, Mark Cooper Day for Alexander Malcolm as a shop and office arcade and named the Royal Arcade. In 1890, the Stock Exchange took up its offices in the arcade which became the focus of gold-mining investment during the peak period of Queensland's most important goldfield.

Gold was discovered at the site of Charters Towers in late 1871 by a prospecting party composed of Hugh Mosman, George Clark, James Fraser and an Aboriginal boy called Jupiter who worked for Mosman. By early 1872 a rush was in progress with an estimated 4,500 on the field by the end of the year. In 1874, following goldfield regulations, a business area was marked out in an area believed to be non-auriferous. In 1877, when Charters Towers petitioned for incorporation as a municipality (the Borough of Charters Towers), this business area was defined as covering one square mile, measured as a half mile in each compass direction from the intersection of Gill and Mosman Streets. This area was the key business and social centre of the town.

The economics of Charters Towers were closely bound up with the geology of the field. The gold was not alluvial, but in the form of reefs of gold-bearing ore. This meant that equipment to extract it and to dig shafts was needed from the start. There were several major reefs and they sloped downwards with loops and branches. The ore near the surface was extracted first. Later, deeper and deeper shafts were necessary to find and extract the gold. At first, small syndicates of miners, crushing mills and local business men financed the mines. As the lodes ran deeper, more capital was needed to exploit them than was available locally.

In 1885, several mining agents formed themselves into a Mining Exchange. This made speculation through the buying and selling of mine shares possible. In 1886, a display featuring ore samples from the Charters Towers mines was set up at the Colonial and Indian Exhibition in London. At the time, some mines were producing extraordinary quantities of gold. The response from British investors resulted in a speculation boom. This did not hold, collapsing in 1888, but as the fabled Brilliant Reef was discovered in the following year, the fortunes of the field were not depressed for long.

The boom had encouraged a number of local businessmen to replace their timber buildings with more substantial brick structures. Alexander Malcolm, who had been on the field since the early 1870s was one of these, replacing his Malcolm's Buildings in Mosman Streets with an elegant arcade of shops and offices. The arcade was designed for him by Sydney architect Mark Cooper Day and was named the Royal Arcade.

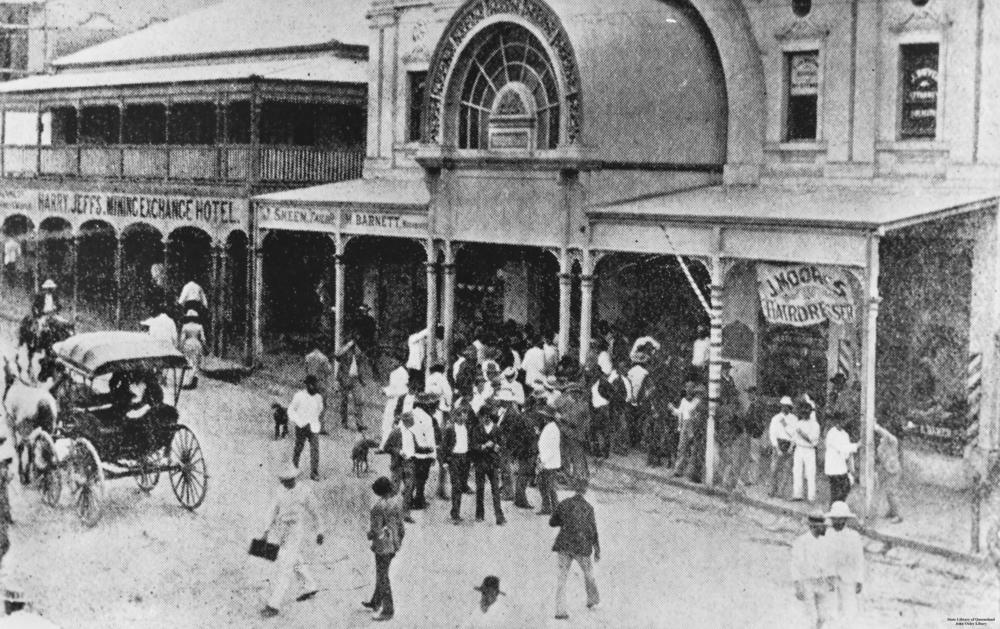
The Stock Exchange in 1891

In 1890, the Stock Exchange reformed along better organised lines and looked for new premises. The Royal Arcade was a wise choice, being centrally placed in the main business area and close to agents and banks. The Exchange signed an initial three-year lease for the use of an office and the courtyard for their evening call at a rent of ten pounds a month. To begin with, two calls a day were made, one at noon and another, open to the public, in the evening. Public interest was such that this evening call was attended by crowds.

In 1892, the introduction of the McArthur-Forrest cyanide process boosted gold production for the field which peaked in 1899 at 319,572 ounces (9,059,700 g). The population also peaked in this year at around 26,500. Charters Towers was now the second most important city in Queensland and an internationally noted goldfield.

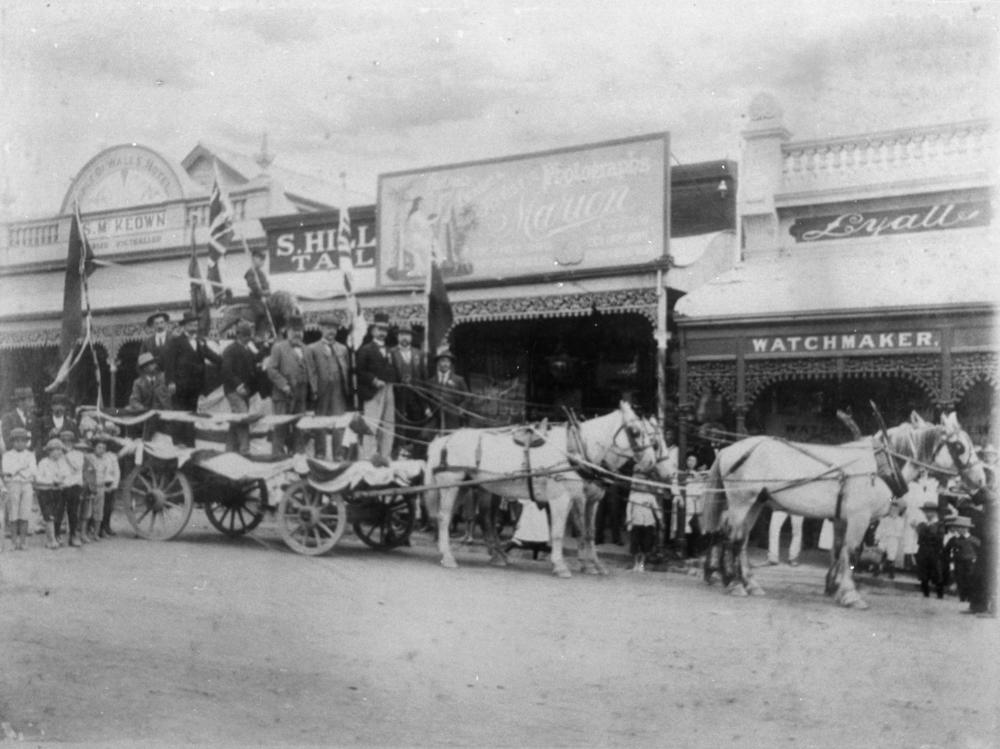
Outside the Stock Exchange in 1900

After 1899, the yield of Charters Towers mines gradually diminished and increasing costs, due to the great depths at which gold was being mined, saw the return to investors falling. In 1912, the warden reported that the extreme depth for profitable mining had been reached. The population fell sharply, as many people moved to coastal towns. In 1916, with little interest in new ventures from investors, the stock exchange closed.

Falling real estates values and vacant buildings allowed a number of private schools to establish themselves, providing a new economic life for Charters Towers as an educational centre. Lack of pressure for expansion and development in Charters Towers meant that many of the buildings dating from the period when it was a world famous goldfield survived remarkably intact. However, the arcade was too large and grand for the reduced population and the type of business that they supported. The cost of maintenance eventually exceeded income from the building and it fell into disrepair.

In 1971, it was acquired by the Charters Towers City Council as trustee for the Charters Towers and Dalrymple Historical Society. It was restored in conjunction with the National Trust of Queensland and when a National Trust Branch was formed in Charters Towers, ownership of the arcade was transferred to the National Trust. The first stage of the conservation repaired the section facing the street, completed in 1972. The second stage conserved the rest of the building in 1975.

The building is now used for offices and shops. The art gallery which occupies the upper floor is named for the architect Don Roderick, who has strong associations with Charters Tower and worked on a voluntary basis with the builder, Bob Aitken, to carry out the urgent work which saved the building and made it usable again.

== Description ==
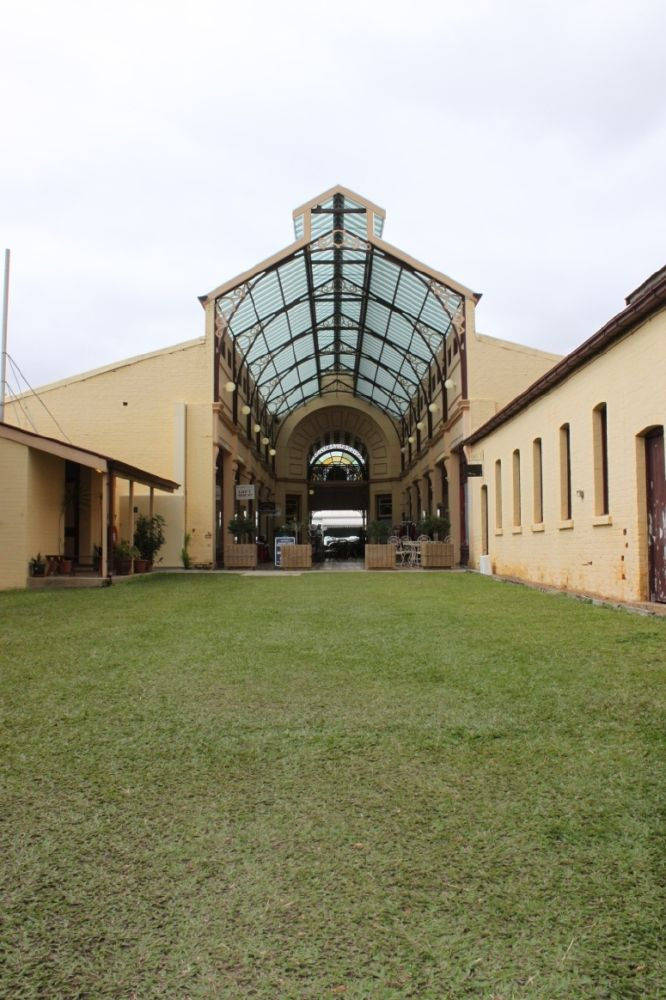
Glazed vaulted roof (seen from the rear of the building), 2012

The Stock Exchange Arcade is a masonry arcade of small offices on both sides of a central court covered with a glazed vault which is supported by steel trusses with decorative inset webs. It is now glazed with modern wired glass. The arcade floor is tessellated tiles. It is entered through a two-storey structure which has offices on the upper floor and shops at street level. The central entrance is protected by a barrel-vaulted portico which projects out from the second storey over the pavement and is supported on timber posts.

The vault is clad with galvanised iron and glazed in at the front with a variety of coloured glass incorporating cast iron panels. It is flanked on the upper storey by pairs of windows and by a metal awning supported by posts to the street on the lower floor. The facade is topped by a stepped, balustraded parapet.

The shop fronts facing the street and within the arcade incorporate large timber framed windows with coloured glass above and cast iron vents above and below. Most of the joinery to the shop fronts is reconstructed. The original timber stairs lead up to the rooms at first floor level which are linked by a bridge with a cast iron balustrade. The wrought iron fence thought to have originally been at the rear of the arcade is now located at the front.

A large, single storey brick assay house with a galvanised iron roof which contains a small collection of mining artefacts is attached to the rear on one side and a modern toilet block to the other.

The back of the property is grassed with a chain wire fence to the land behind. The lamp standard is not original.

== Heritage listing ==
Stock Exchange Arcade was listed on the Queensland Heritage Register on 21 October 1992 having satisfied the following criteria.

The place is important in demonstrating the evolution or pattern of Queensland's history.

The Stock Exchange Arcade is emblematic of the importance of the discovery of gold to the development of north Queensland. It was one of only two stock exchanges outside the capital, both of which were on goldfields (the other being the Gympie Stock Exchange). Its grand architecture illustrates the wealth and confidence of Charters Towers in the nineteenth century. The abrupt finish to the arcade, which appears to be uncompleted, evokes the rise and fall of fortunes typically connected with goldfield towns.

The place demonstrates rare, uncommon or endangered aspects of Queensland's cultural heritage.

It is an early example of an arcade in Queensland and has aesthetic value as a work of architecture that is well liked by the community for its scale, landmark barrel vault entrance, traditional shop fronts, material and detail.

The place is important in demonstrating the principal characteristics of a particular class of cultural places.

Its construction demonstrates the adaptation of the architectural forms of its period to the north Queensland climate by improved ventilation.

The place is important because of its aesthetic significance.

It is a rare, early example of an arcade in Queensland and has aesthetic value as a work of architecture that is well liked by the community for its scale, landmark barrel vault entrance, traditional shop fronts, material and detail.

The place has a strong or special association with a particular community or cultural group for social, cultural or spiritual reasons.

It is a rare, early example of an arcade in Queensland and has aesthetic value as a work of architecture that is well liked by the community for its scale, landmark barrel vault entrance, traditional shop fronts, material and detail. It is associated with the establishment of the Charter's Tower's branch of the National Trust of Queensland.
