= William Henry Allan Munro =

Scottish-Australian architect (1856–1913)

William Henry Allan Munro (1856 – 23 February 1913) was an architect in Queensland, Australia. Some of his works are now heritage-listed.

== Early life ==
Munro was born in Inverness, Scotland, in 1856, the son of tailor George Munro and his wife Mary (née Allan). He trained under Matthews & Lawrie.

== Architectural career ==
In 1886, he emigrated to Queensland and worked as an architect for Rooney Brothers of Townsville. There, he won the competition for the Queensland Hotel and was taken into partnership by Walter Eyre in 1887. After the firm ceased trading in 1892, Munro worked for the government but also undertook private contracts.

== Death ==
Munro died on 23 February 1913 in Brisbane. The following day, he was interred at the South Brisbane Cemetery.

== Significant works ==
- 1889: Bank of New South Wales Building, Charters Towers
- 1889: Holy Trinity Anglican Church, Herberton
- 1890: Ferrari Estates Building, Cooktown
- 1891: Townsville School of Arts
- 1910: The Grand Hotel, Hughenden
