= Eyre & Munro =

Eyre & Munro was an architectural partnership in Townsville, Queensland, Australia. A number of their works are now heritage-listed.

== History ==
Walter Morris Eyre was an architect, engineer and surveyor. He was born in 1858 and trained in England. He was immigrated to Queensland and in 1880 was appointed as the first Shire Clerk and Superintendent of Works for the Toowong Shire Council. He worked in the office of his cousin, Francis Drummond Greville Stanley, from 1881 until he was appointed City Engineer of Townsville in 1885. In 1887 he left to set up in practice as an architect and soon gained enough work to take on William Henry Allan Munro as a junior partner.

William Henry Allan Munro was born in Inverness, Scotland in 1856 and trained under Matthews & Lawrie. In 1886, he emigrated to Queensland and worked as an architect for Rooney Brothers of Townsville. There he won the competition for the Queensland Hotel and was taken into partnership by Eyre.

The firm supervised the work of southern architects as well as designing buildings and were responsible for a number of major works in North Queensland before the firm ceased operations in 1892.

== Significant works ==
Their partnership produced a number of significant works, including:

- 1889: Holy Trinity Anglican Church, Herberton
- 1890–1891: Ferrari Estates Building (formerly the Queensland National Bank), Cooktown
- 1891: Townsville School of Arts
