= Charters Towers Post Office =

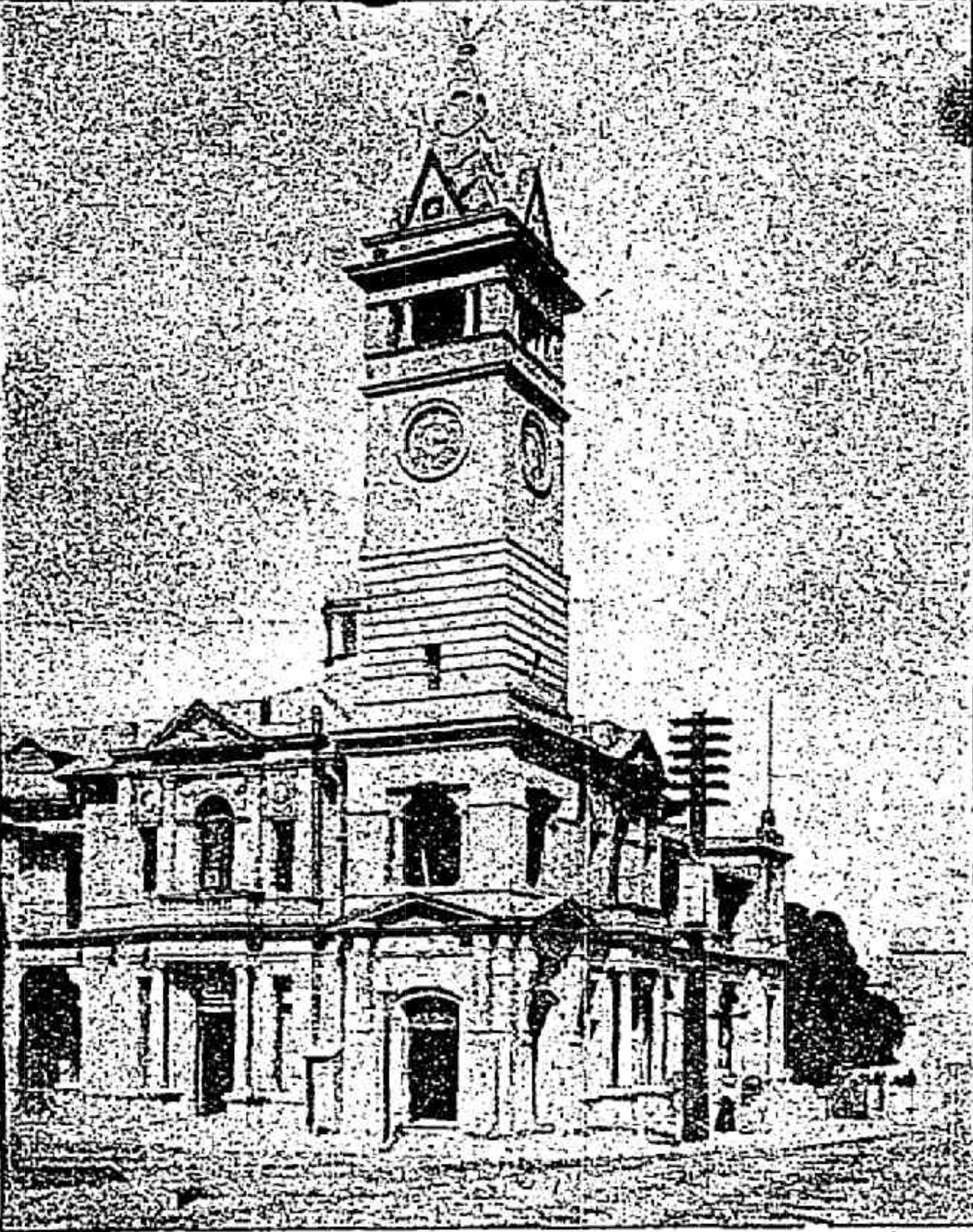
- Charter Towers Post Office, 1910

- Location within Queensland
- 20.0758°S 146.2580°E
- Location: 17 Gill Street, Charters Towers City, Charters Towers, Charters Towers Region, Queensland, Australia

Commonwealth Heritage List
- Official name: Charters Towers Post Office
- Type: Listed place (Historic)
- Designated: 8 November 2011
- Reference no.: 105523

Charters Towers Post Office is a heritage-listed post office at 17 Gill Street, Charters Towers City, Charters Towers, Charters Towers Region, Queensland, Australia. It was added to the Australian Commonwealth Heritage List on 8 November 2011.

== History ==
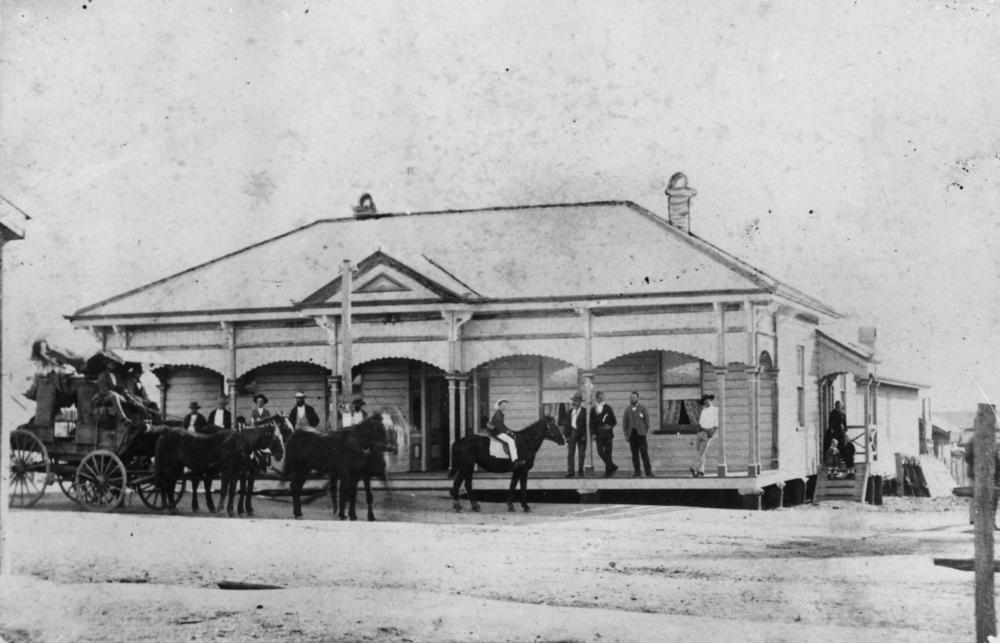
The former post office, circa 1880

A postal service was established at Charters Towers in 1872 following the discovery of gold in 1871. Jupiter Mosman is credited with finding gold near Towers Hill, with the goldfields proclaimed in 1872, and Charters Towers rapidly proclaimed a municipality in 1877, and a city in April 1909.

The initial discovery of gold in the greater Charter Towers area was followed by a peak mass migration of 30,000 miners, investors and entrepreneurs. Extraordinary amounts of gold were initially discovered and by 1898 the Charters Towers district was producing more than 320,000 ounces of gold per annum, establishing it as the richest major goldfield in Australia as well as an internationally noted goldfield for many years.

Production levels soon began to decline, however, in the early twentieth century and in the absence of dividends or reinvestment, gold mining on the Charters Towers gold field eventually (albeit temporarily over the long term) ground to a halt in 1917.

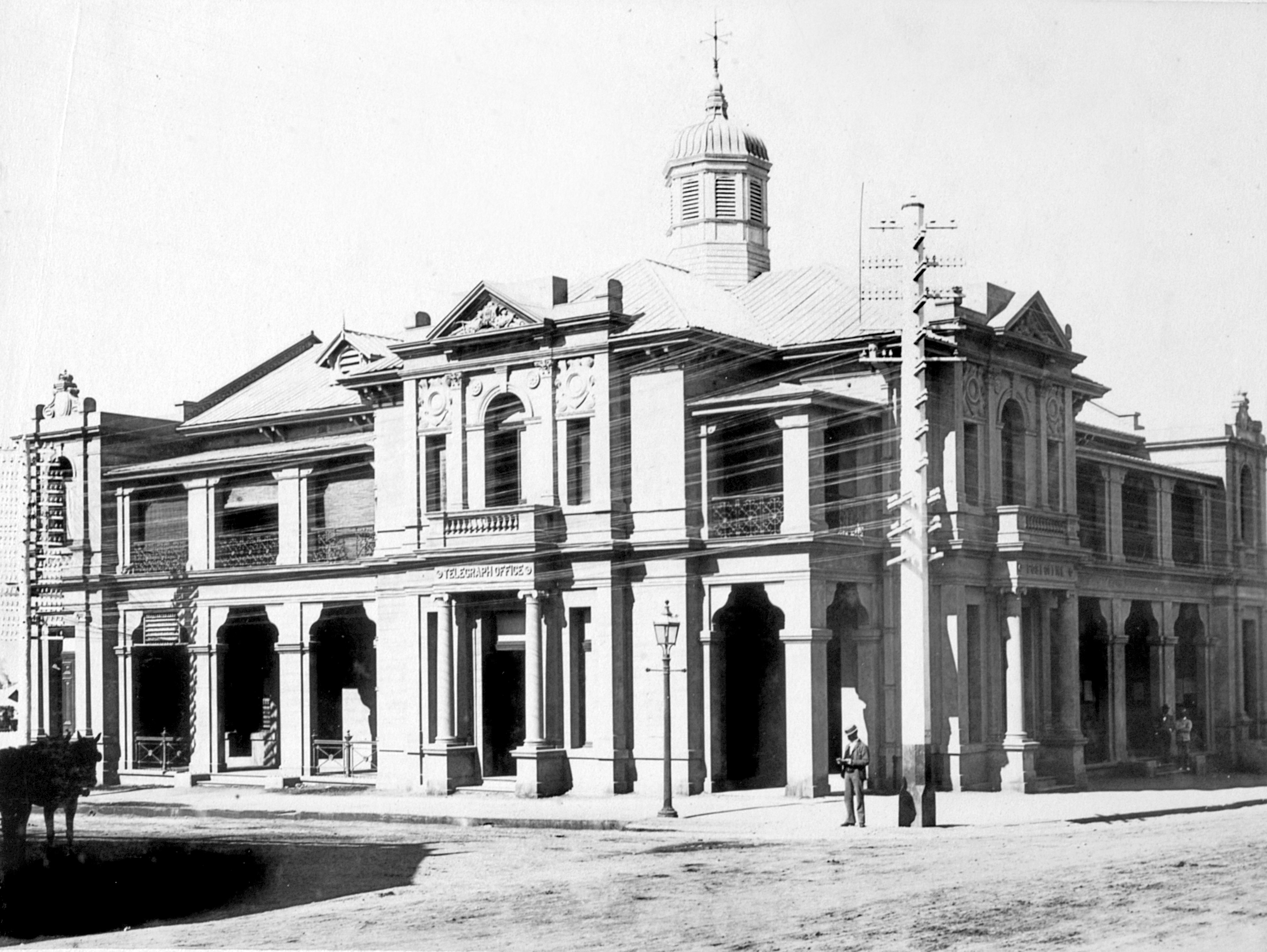
Charters Towers Post Office (prior to the addition of the clock tower), circa 1890

The first post office was constructed in 1879–80, during the peak migration period and expansion of the town. This was later replaced by the current building in 1892, which was a large double-storey building, with post and telegraph facilities at ground floor, and residential quarters at first floor level. The clock tower was added in 1898 and alterations to the rear of the building were undertaken in 1900. Subsequent repairs and maintenance was carried out in 1905–06 and additions in 1906–07.

Once the second largest city in Queensland, due to the gold mining boom, Charters Towers has a rich collection of heritage buildings, and a current population of about 8,000.

The building was designed in the Queensland Government Architect's office during the changeover of leadership from George St Paul Connolly to Alfred Barton Brady with Thomas Pye and possibly also John Smith Murdoch involved with the project.

== Description ==
Charters Towers Post Office is at 17 Gill Street, corner Bow Street, Charters Towers, comprising the whole of Lot 2 RP 732390.

It is a two-storey masonry building with public areas on the ground floor and the original two flats incorporated on the upper level now converted to working space.

The post office is located on a prominent corner site to Gill Street and Bow Street, a block back from the main road in Deane Street. This places it in the heart of Charters Towers' conservation area, a mixture of buildings from the late Victorian and Federation periods, including the former DS General Store at 18 Gill Street, of c. 1900, possibly Charters Towers' best-known building, just opposite (now a Target store).

The first form of the Post Office was as a symmetrical verandahed building facing Gill Street, with a cast-iron double-storey verandah, deep latticework friezes and a hipped roof clad in corrugated galvanised iron. In the manner of Queensland stump houses, the upper verandah was centred compositionally with a pediment, and balustraded with cast iron lacework. The three chimneys were stuccoed Italianate in detail, with large moulded caps. The central structure at the roof top is a lantern. The symmetrical front is then backed by a long spine of smaller rooms linked by an L-shaped verandah. The apartment windows on the first floor were French full-height paired doors, and the lower windows were broad double hung sashes. The building was, arguably, indistinguishable from any number of pub designs, such as those at nearby Ravenswood.

The 1892–1898 alterations made this elevation asymmetrical, replacing the original central door with an elongated porch area to the right side, and a large corner tower. These changes reflect aspects of the (then) new Baroque Revivalism just appearing in Britain. It is not clear from the drawings whether the original front door had an arched top, but it gained one in these alterations, having a large thermal fanlight over a broad three-part setting of door and flanking hall windows. Next to that came the new porch, treated as a two-stepped breakfront with stuccoed flanking piers and paired Corinthian columns at the centre bay. This arrangement framed a central door and two tall flanking casements on the ground floor, with 1:2 "Norman Shaw" light divisions; on the upper floor an arched central window with paired casement was set between two tall flanking windows with glazed roundels overhead, resembling a Serlian arch or transformed triumphal arch. The central window is also fronted by a waisted balustrade framing a balconette.

The vigour of this breakfront largely submerged the former elevation, which was masked further by the replacement of its cast iron columns with a set of astylar pilasters backed by piers, and topped with scroll consoles supporting the upper verandah. This verandah floor was profiled by a frieze running across through the breakfront and then on around the base of the clock tower. The roof was converted to a transverse gable form with the breakfront across it, balanced asymmetrically by a gabled dormer vent. The largest roof feature, though, was the new lantern, an octagonal, heavily layered design with an ogival metal-clad roof and weather-vane finial. A gabled parapet terminated the roof at the west end, and below that was a bay repeating the central bays on the breakfront and counterbalancing the mass concentrated at the other end of the elevation. The early chimneys appear to have been removed.

The five-storey clock tower of 1898 is separated from the ground floor by a broad, low pediment moulded into the frieze on each elevation. Inside each is the inscription "A1898D", the year of the tower's completion. Above the first floor is another frieze, this time plain, and a storey of rusticated stuccoed banding, punctuated by a single vent window. Above that comes the clock face storey, completely plain apart from the clock, and above that is the lookout, more Romanesque than Baroque in its flavour, with colonnettes, a roundel balustrade, parapet gables to east and west, and a four-sided metal-clad extruded pyramid spire, patterned in descending chevrons and fronted on the Gill street side by an equilaterally triangular pediment with circular vent.

The building is two storeys with a five-storey tower with some single-storey additions to the rear.

=== Condition ===
With regard to subsequent (post 1898) works and changes, the early 1900s included changes/additions to the rear and internal works. The next phase of additions and alterations may have been for larger telephone exchange accommodation in the 1920s or 1930s, and the sheds to the rear, documented in 1937, were primarily for servicing the telephone network. A double-height lean-to verandah has been added to the sing-bay pavilion at the west end of the Gill Street elevation. This appears to have a mixed frame of timber posts and steel tubing, and the balustrades appear to have been filled in with cement sheeting. The long "bunkhouse" chain of service rooms behind the early design appears to have gone, replaced by a shorter two-storey trailing wing, running back along the Deane Street elevation behind the clock tower. By the mid-1990s the post office had a remodelled retail area, lunch room, locker room, two storerooms, a partitioned manager's office, and a PO box lobby running around the corner under the tower, and filling one and part of another of the breakfronts on their ground floor. Much of the original interior has now been destroyed. The upstairs flat area retains its separate entrance.

== Heritage listing ==
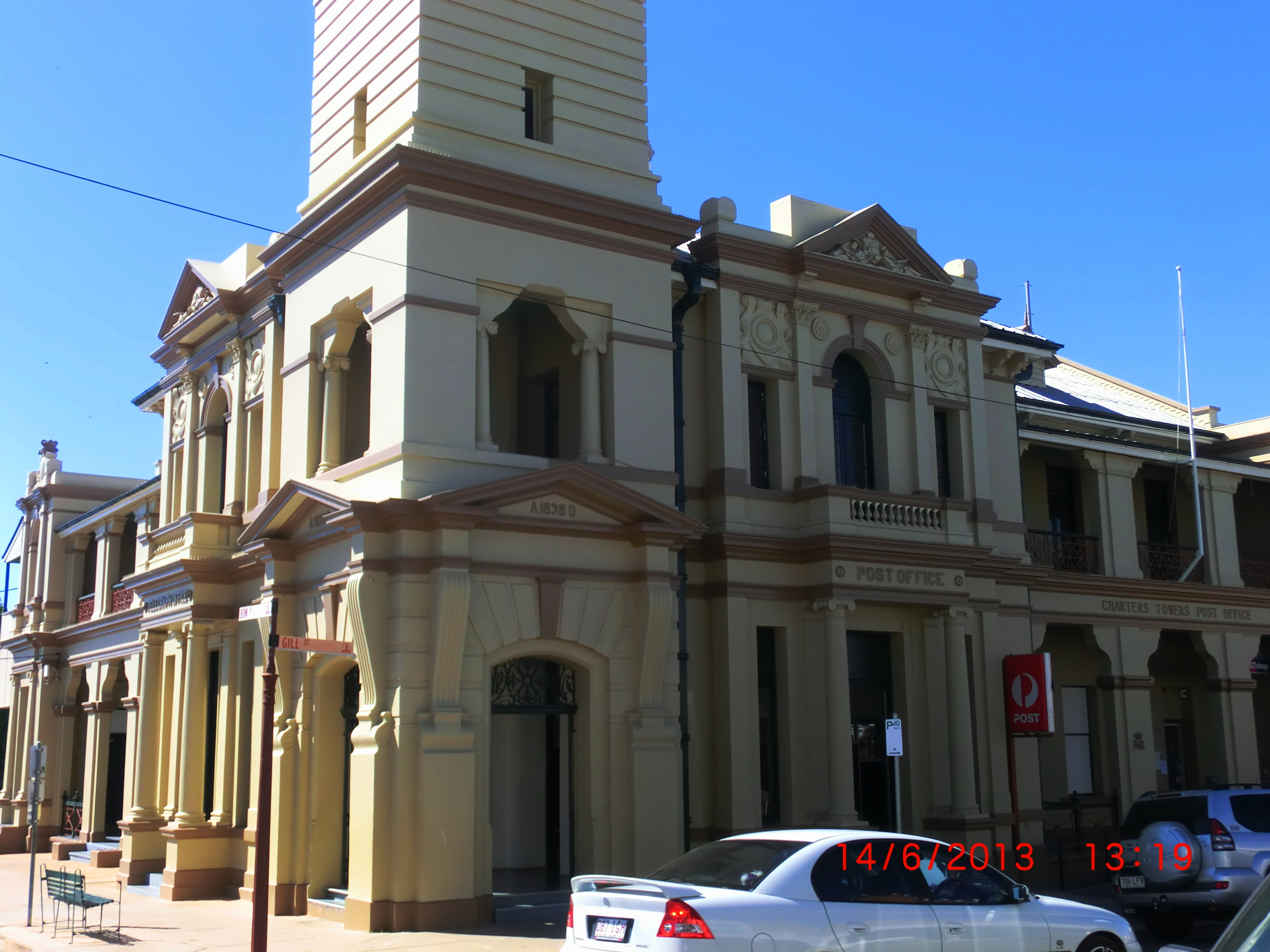
Lower floors, 2013

Charters Towers Post Office was listed on the Australian Commonwealth Heritage List on 8 November 2011 having satisfied the following criteria.

Criterion A: Processes

Charters Towers Post Office, constructed and extended in the 1890s, is an important regional post office building which has been associated with postal services for over 110 years. Through its scale and late Victorian/Baroque Revival architectural treatment, it is demonstrative of the extraordinary prosperity of Charters Towers, and the associated gold field, in the latter decades of the nineteenth century.

The significant components of Charters Towers Post Office include the evolved main postal building and clock tower dating from 1892 to 1898. The additions of 1906–07 are also of significance.

Criterion D: Characteristic values

Charters Towers Post office is an example of:

- a post office and telegraph office with quarters (second generation typology 1870–1929)
- a mixed late Victorian style, early Baroque Revival style with Queen Anne Free Style detailing
- the work of the Queensland Government architects Alfred Barton Brady, Thomas Pye and possibly also John Smith Murdoch

Typologically, Charters Towers Post Office originally combined post and telegraph facilities at ground floor, and residential quarters at first floor level. The clock tower was added in 1898 along with other significant alterations to the building exterior, with further alterations to the rear of the building in 1900. The next phase of alterations in the 1920s or 1930s are believed to have expanded the telephone exchange accommodation, with sheds added to the rear in 1937 to service the telephone network. By the mid-1990s the post office had a remodelled retail area, lunch room, locker room, two storerooms, a partitioned manager's office, and a PO box lobby running around the corner under the tower, and filling one and part of another of the breakfronts on their ground floor. While these alterations changed the internal planning and arrangements, the exterior of the building was not so affected, at least to its 1898 form and detailing. The first floor residential component also remains evident.

Stylistically and architecturally, the post office is an important fusion of late Victorian and Baroque Revival genres in Queensland, with some Queen Anne Free Style detailing (such as ogee consoles on the ground floor, and equilateral triangle-pediments on the clock tower). The vigorous reworking associated with the breakfront, entry porch and clock tower of 1898, are part of an early essay in the Baroque Revival grand manner, by one of its most important practitioners in Australia, the Queensland Government Architect Alfred Barton Brady.

Criterion E: Aesthetic characteristics

Charters Towers Post Office is a prominent late nineteenth century public building in the city, with landmark qualities and aesthetic characteristics which contribute greatly to the heritage character of Gill Street. It is valued for its prominent corner siting; five-storey corner clock tower with friezes, rusticated stuccoed banding, colonnettes, parapet gables and four-sided metal-clad extruded pyramid spire; two-stepped breakfront porch entrance with flanking piers and paired Corinthian columns; and verandah with astylar pilasters topped with scroll consoles. The roof also sports a prominent octagonal roof lantern with an ogival metal-clad roof and weather-vane finial lantern.

Criterion G: Social value

Charters Towers Post Office is of social significance to the community of Charters Towers and the surrounding region, as a prominent and valued public building dating to the era of nineteenth century gold prosperity in the city, and as the focus of postal services and communication in the town for over 120 years.
