= The Grand Hotel, Hughenden =

Grand Hotel, Hughenden
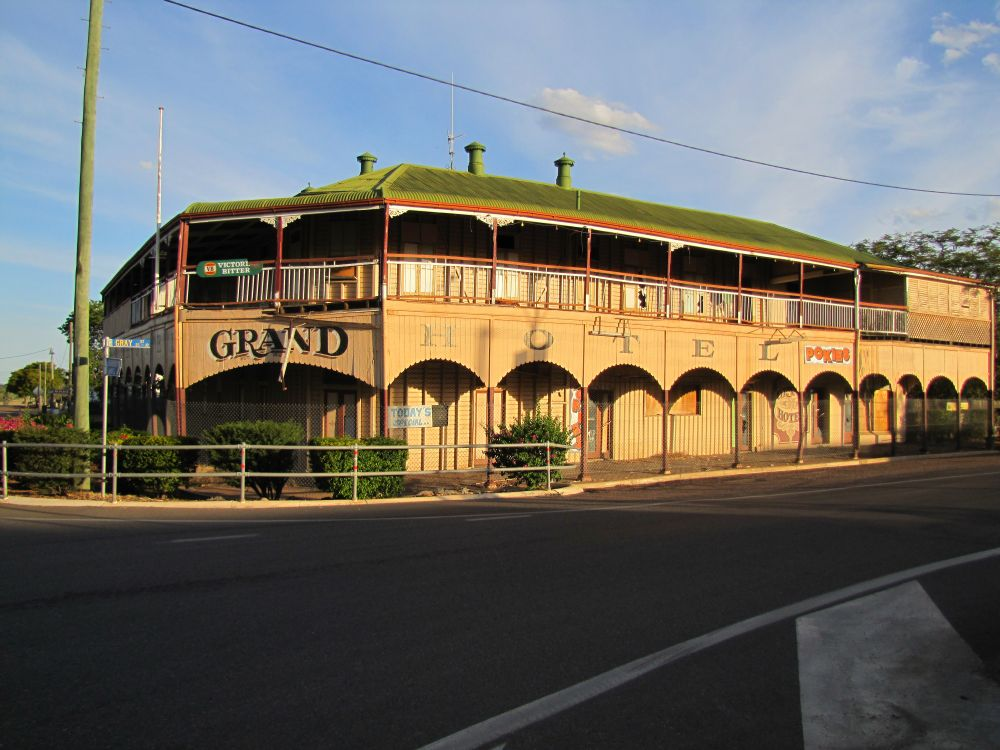
- The Grand Hotel, 2014

- Location within Queensland Location within Australia
- 20.8443°S 144.2007°E
- Location: 36 Stansfield Street, Hughenden, Shire of Flinders, Queensland, Australia

History
- Built: 1910
- Demolished: 16 November 2018 (fire)

Site notes
- Architect: Munro and Co

Queensland Heritage Register
- Official name: The Grand Hotel, Grand Hotel, Hughenden
- Type: state heritage (built)
- Designated: 27 April 2007
- Reference no.: 602608
- Significant period: 1910 (fabric); 1910–2000s (historical use)
- Builders: Richie and Doig

The Grand Hotel was a heritage-listed hotel at 36 Stansfield Street, Hughenden, Shire of Flinders, Queensland, Australia. It was designed by Munro and Co and built in 1910 by Richie and Doig. It was added to the Queensland Heritage Register on 27 April 2007. It was destroyed in a fire on 16 November 2018.

== History ==
Constructed in 1910, The Grand Hotel was a good example of a two-storeyed, timber, corner hotel once typical of rural Queensland towns. It was established at a time of growth and the development of Hughenden as a service centre and railhead for the surrounding pastoral properties and mineral fields. The hotel was prominently sited at the intersection of Hughenden's two principal streets and was regarded as the district's premium hotel. Constructed from timber and iron, the hotel had a number of characteristics of the vernacular Queensland style.

Hughenden is situated on the banks of the Flinders River, 383 kilometres (238 mi) southwest of Townsville. With a population of about one thousand, it is the largest town in the area and is an important road and rail centre. Pentland and the smaller towns of Prairie and Torrens Creek are the only other sizeable settlements in the district.

Frederick Walker traversed the Hughenden district in October 1861, leaving a blazed tree where Hughenden is today. William Landsborough explored the region the following year. Both parties had been searching for evidence of the ill-fated Burke & Wills expedition. Although the search itself was not successful, the real success lay in Landsborough's investigation of the Gulf of Carpentaria and the inland rivers. The discovery of the importance of the Flinders and Gregory Plains for stock, and of the Albert River as an export and supply port led to the opening up of Western Queensland.

Ernest Henry of McConnell Station on the Burdekin River was not only the founder of Hughenden but also Cloncurry. Hughenden was named after the Tudor Manor House of Henry's grandfather in Buckinghamshire, England. Henry's claims for the pastoral leases of Hughenden and other runs were the first to be entered in the Commissioner for Crown Land's register. In 1863 Henry travelled to the Burdekin with his cousin Robert Gray to purchase livestock that would become the founding stock of Hughenden Station.

In 1865, Henry sold Hughenden Station to Gray. As the pastoral industry grew, so did the stock route network. Hughenden station was used as a drovers' camp. In 1876, Gray allowed William Marks to build a hotel on the station to cater for travellers passing through to the Cloncurry mining area. Hughenden's first hotel, the Great Western, opened in 1877, the same year in which the town was surveyed.

By the 1880s, stock routes were used extensively and the Hughenden-Winton and Hughenden-Cloncurry route were the major routes of northwestern Queensland. The town continued to expand as a service centre for the district with the commencement of regular Cobb and Co coach services. In 1887, the Great Northern railway reached Hughenden after having been extended from Prairie. Prior to the railway being extended towards Winton and Cloncurry, the town depended on the carrier trade with up to fifty teams unloading at the railway station. In 1888, Wilmetts Almanac described Hughenden as being on the direct route to Cloncurry, a district rich in minerals, including gold reefs, copper lodes and opals. Hughenden continued to prosper due to the richness of the soil and its close proximity to the Flinders River. The addition of a dumping company where wool from the surrounding district was pressed before being railed to Townsville also ensured the town's survival. It was also the main trucking place for stock and for central meat works. As a transport hub for stock, supplies and as a service centre for the northwestern district, Hughenden had no equal at the end of the nineteenth century.

The town gained further significance with the Shearers' Strikes of 1891 and 1894. This occurred because of the use by pastoralists of non-union and Chinese labourers. In 1891, a tree on the banks of the Flinders River was blazed to commemorate the strike.

The decade in which The Grand Hotel was constructed (1910) was a progressive time: an ice works was constructed along with a skating rink, a showgrounds grandstand and the town's first motor garage. Economically, Hughenden prospered and companies such as Cummins & Campbell's Pty Ltd which had been trading in the area since 1899 established an agency in Hughenden in 1909.

In common with so many other Queensland country towns, a large number of timber hotels in Hughenden were destroyed by fire. Just prior to opening both The Grand Hotel and the Shamrock Hotel were subject to an arson attempt. In 1903, ten public houses existed in Hughenden. The Railway Hotel burnt down in 1903 along with several businesses. In 1923 the Royal Hotel, Commercial Hotel and several other businesses including a bank and the post office, were destroyed and in 1925 the Metropole Hotel and Cafe were consumed by fire. The Shamrock Hotel was destroyed by fire in 1967. The c. 1890 Great Western Hotel burnt to the ground on Christmas Eve 1976 and the rebuilt Royal Hotel was destroyed by fire in 1980. This then left The Grand Hotel as the last remaining 20th century timber hotel in Hughenden.

The Grand Hotel was designed by Munro and Co with Townsville builders Richie and Doig responsible for construction. William Munro had arrived in Queensland in 1886 and was employed as an architect by Rooney Bros of Townsville. After winning a local competition for the design of the "Queensland" Hotel in Townsville, Munro joined Walter Eyre in partnership in 1887. After the firm ceased trading in 1892, Munro worked for the government however continued with private contracts. The owner and first publican of The Grand Hotel was Mary Robinson. The North Queensland Herald reported on 12 September 1910 that Mrs Robinson's new hotel would be named "Imperial", but after narrowly escaping destruction by an arsonist, the new hotel officially opened as the "Grand Hotel" on 7 October.

The North Queensland Herald described the hotel as a symmetrical two-storied structure on the main thoroughfare from the railway. On the ground floor there was a bar with four parlours, hall entrances from both streets, an office, billiard room and dining room. It was framed with hardwood and silky oak chamfer boards and beneath the bar there was an extensive cellar with street access. The first storey contained 11 double bedrooms and four single rooms. A large sitting room featured a discreet private sitting room for ladies at the eastern end of the balcony. Guest amenities were provided by the three upstairs bathrooms. French lights, ornamental bracket scroll louvres and coloured glass panels with ornamental margin lights featured at the end of each hall. The hotel was lighted throughout by aerogen gas; a pressurised mixture of air and petrol vapour. This method was described as being a "novel system" of lighting in the west.

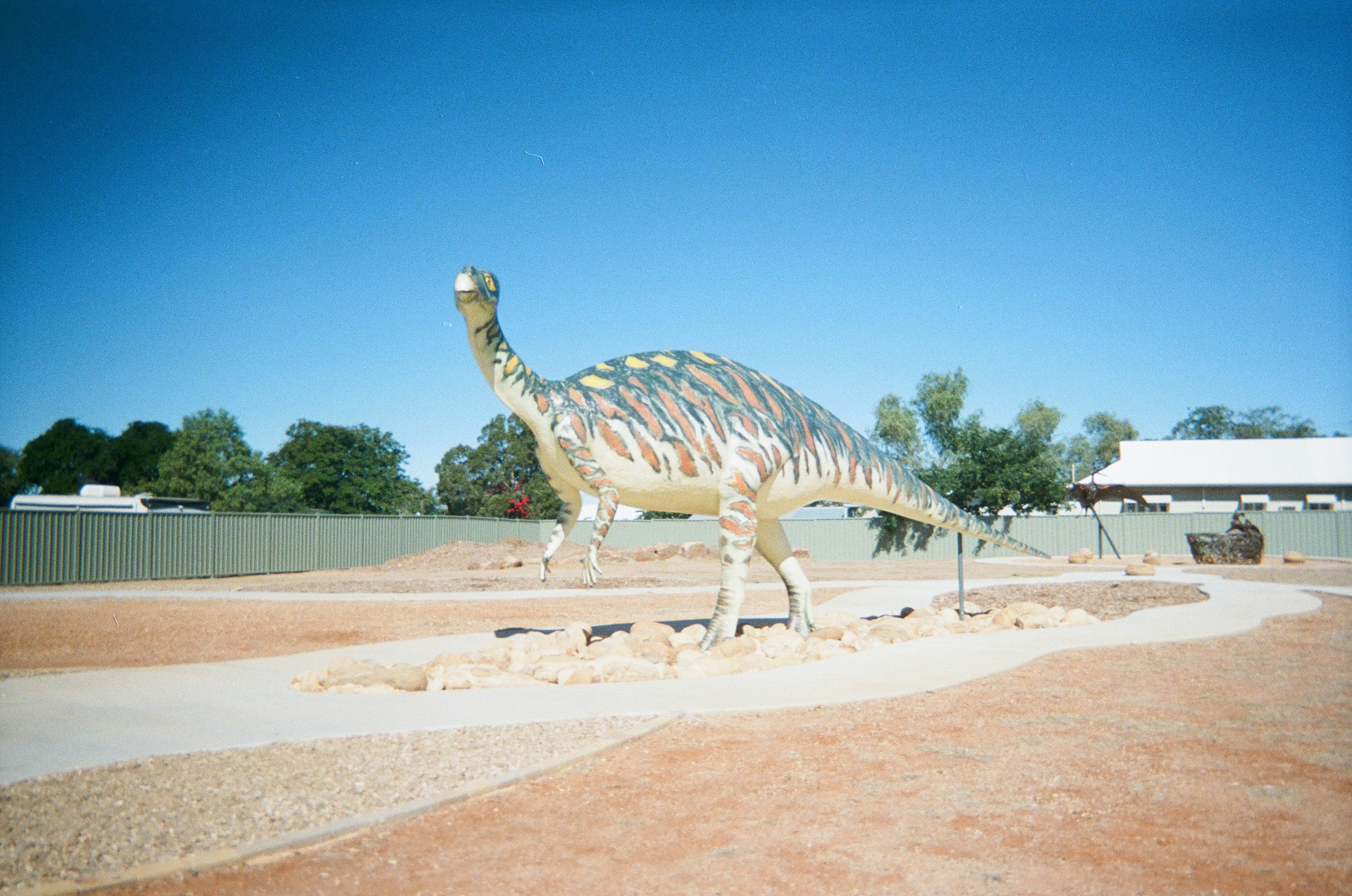
Mutt, the replica Muttaburrasaurus, occupying the site of the former Grand Hotel, in 2025

In September 1912, Mrs Robinson leased The Grand Hotel to Patrick O'Neill, a former representative of James Stewart and Co in Rockhampton. In 1924, William John Gillespie bought The Grand Hotel. It remained in the Gillespie family until 1945 when it was purchased by Burns Philp and Company Ltd.

The Grand Hotel was touted as the towns' premiere hotel from its inception and by 1927 it was being advertised as a Commercial Travellers Association (CTA) approved house. A CTA approved House was regarded as the finest hotel in town and The Grand Hotel was the only CTA house in Hughenden. Located two minutes from the Post Office, its attractions included first class cuisine, Allcock's latest Billiard Tables and plunge and shower baths. At this time a licence was required to have a billiard table on commercial premises. Good stabling and sample rooms where members could display their goods was a feature of the hotel. Not only did the Grand provide accommodation and meals for boarders and visitors to the town, but it also acted as an informal club. Public and lounge bar facilities catered for different types of clientele. These functions made it very important in the life of a town.

The Hotel's furniture and fittings were of high quality. Its silky oak furniture was manufactured by Rooney Bros. of Townsville and was probably built around the time of the Grand's construction in 1910. The fanlight panels above the doors are identical to a pattern used by Rooney's indicating that the Company made them. The facilities and ambience of the upper common room were regarded as the finest of any hotel in the north-west. It was furnished with a ping-pong table, palms and ferns in floor planters and hanging ferns. The furniture consisted of lawyer cane chairs and tables. A large room on the first storey was known as the "Bull Ring" and was used as accommodation for shearers. When the Hughenden show occurred the hotel was at full capacity. Extra accommodation was provided through the use of canvas stretchers which were stored on site and were only used at times of increased demand.

During the 1930s and 1940s The Grand Hotel and the Central Hotel vied for competition as the town's premium accommodation. The Grand Hotel was used to billet the wives and children of Australian Army and Air Force Officers during 1942–1945. The Japanese threat of aerial attack or a land invasion on coastal areas meant many people relocated to western areas. Hughenden with its large number of hotels was used as accommodation for families. A RAAF Aerodrome was located at Hughenden and the US Army Air force had an airfield under construction at the nearby town of Torrens Creek by 23 March 1942.

Around 1952 a two-storey masonry section was added to the rear of the hotel, which involved the demolition of two adjacent small shops unconnected to the hotel. This masonry section extended the Grand's bar facilities.

Hughenden remains an important business centre for families on outlying stations and is increasingly being used by motor tourists as a rest stop. Images of The Grand Hotel feature in tourist information for the area and it is also visible in a series of television advertisements for the north-west promoting the "Dinosaur Trail" fossil exhibits of the region. The hotel closed in July 2004 due to new fire regulations and increased insurance costs. However, the Grand still displays many of its original design features. It is the last of the town's many early hotels and is the largest and most ornate two storey timber hotel in northwestern Queensland.

On Friday 16 November 2018, the Grand Hotel burnt to the ground during the night.

== Description ==
The Grand Hotel is located on the corner of Gray and Stansfield Streets facing north and west and is one of the larger buildings in Hughenden. The main entrance to the bar is typically located at the corner. The hotel is double-storey and has a roughly rectangular plan. It was originally L-shaped with a kitchen wing forming a courtyard at the rear, which subsequent additions have enclosed. Although a relatively plain building it achieves some prominence through its size compared to its neighbours and the effect of the deep, scalloped valance below the first floor veranda balustrade.

The hotel is of timber frame construction with exposed studding and horizontal chamferboard walls with internal beading. These materials have been overlaid or replaced in several areas. There is a substantial, rendered masonry (probably concrete block) extension to the south wing.

The main roof is hipped and covered with painted corrugated iron. This has been continued over the masonry extension to the south. There are four roof ventilators conspicuously ranged along the line of the ridge. The verandahs are bull nose. Where the courtyard has been enclosed the roof is in separate sections linked together with box gutters. At the rear the veranda roof, although enclosed is still legible and consists of convex curved corrugated iron.

There is a substantial double-storey outbuilding behind the hotel on the western boundary. It has a timber framed chamferboard upper floor supported on reinforced concrete columns. The roof is hipped and covered with painted corrugated iron.

The north and east elevations are dominated by the double storey verandah. The posts are timber although those on the extremities have been replaced with steel columns. At first floor level there is a two-rail dowel balustrade over a deep, scalloped, valance formed from tongue-and-groove matchboards and decorative fretwork brackets. Four bays of the balustrade have been replaced with galvanised iron sheet and most of the fretwork brackets are missing. Where the building has been extended the veranda is fully enclosed with adjustable timber louvres.

The south elevation reflects the additions that have occurred over time. These are illustrated in changes of roof pitch, joint lines in the chamferboard and various window types. The masonry section has a painted render finish with side-hung casement windows. There is a single flight, steel and timber stair leading to the first floor. The remaining walls reflect several additions.

The north elevation similarly illustrates the changes that have been made to the building, particularly alterations to the windows. There are four relatively ornate window hoods to first floor windows.

=== Interior ground floor ===
==== Dining room ====
The dining room is located in the northwest corner of the building and is in more or less original condition. The west wall has been panelled over and the windows blocked. Three sets of double doors to the service corridor have been widened at some stage and then sealed. The remaining walls have their original boards. The ceiling is intact, with two decorative fretwork vents. The floor is covered with carpet.

==== Entrance hall ====
The entrance hall is a simple space with a non-original door and sidelights. The walls are horizontal boards and the ceiling is tongue and groove matchboard. The staircase is comparatively elaborate with very large newel posts and contrasts with the general plainness of the building. The window at the landing is glazed with decorative glass.

==== Bar area ====
This is a large space and presumably combines several earlier rooms. Almost no original fabric is visible, the walls being panelled in plywood and the ceiling covered in fibro. Over the bar area air conditioning ducting has been enclosed in a lowered ceiling finished with acoustic tiles. An irregular concrete slab has been laid across about half of the floor.

==== Masonry extension ====
At ground floor level this extension to the building includes part of the Bar, the ladies and gents toilets and a small shop, opening off the veranda footpath.

==== Kitchen area ====
There is a service corridor between the kitchen and the dining room that may originally have been an open veranda. The kitchen is presumably in its original location. Walls and ceiling are panelled over and the wood stove, which is in a masonry alcove, has been completely sealed off. A small pantry and cold room are located on what was presumably an open veranda alongside the kitchen.

A store, laundry and a flight of stairs leading to the first floor are adjacent to the kitchen. Veranda posts and valance alongside the stairs indicate that this was part of an open veranda.

==== Gaming, bar area, and garage ====
These spaces have been introduced into the original courtyard area over time in a fairly haphazard way with a variety of materials. The original veranda posts remain in position either incorporated into the walls or freestanding.

=== First floor ===
==== Hotel rooms ====
All rooms are in largely original condition, the only changes being to external fanlights to accommodate air conditioners and the internal fretwork fanlights being covered over. The rooms on the outside corner are larger than the others while the room on the inside corner is totally enclosed but has a central skylight (now covered).

==== Managers flat ====
The flat occupies the upper floor of the masonry extension to the building. It is essentially a two bedroom flat with a large portion of the veranda enclosed with adjustable timber louvres. While there is a sink in the living area there is no kitchen. The floor is timber covered with carpet.

==== Store and other rooms ====
Several rooms are located over the kitchen area. It is possible that these rooms may have been added later with a veranda connecting with that of the main building.

==== Toilets and bathrooms ====
These are all relatively recent and have been built over the original courtyard area in several stages.

=== Courtyard ===
The central area of what was the courtyard has been covered over with a boarded floor forming a common room for hotel guests. The roof is raised above that of the original veranda roof to allow the insertion of clerestory windows to all sides.

==== Beer garden ====
This is a large concreted area with two freestanding pavilions of recent construction.

==== Outbuilding ====
The outbuilding has several service enclosures and a laundry area located at ground floor level. The upper floor has two small rooms and one large room opening off a wide veranda. A bathroom and toilet also open off the veranda.

=== The site ===
The road frontage boundaries have a paling fence while the southern boundary has a post and wire fence. The western boundary is unfenced. An L-shaped concrete slab is located in the southeastern corner of the site. This was the veranda floor for two transportable buildings since removed. A few pepper trees are located adjacent to the west elevation and some mature trees and shrubs along the Gray Street boundary. There is little indication of a formal garden.

== Heritage listing ==
The Grand Hotel was listed on the Queensland Heritage Register on 27 April 2007 having satisfied the following criteria.

The place is important in demonstrating the evolution or pattern of Queensland's history.

Constructed in 1910, The Grand Hotel is one of a number of timber hotels erected in Hughenden in the late 19th and early 20th centuries. As a provider of food, accommodation and entertainment, the number and size of hotels in a town were used as an indicator of the prosperity of a district. The Grand, as the earliest surviving hotel in Hughenden, illustrates the unprecedented growth then occurring in the Flinders Shire, when Hughenden was the flourishing centre of a substantial pastoral and mining district. It was also a major transport node in the important east–west route to the coast, and was often considered the gateway to the pastoral West. This traffic needed hotels, of which the Grand was one of the more select. The hotel is significant as a substantially intact example of western Queensland hotel architecture.

The place is important in demonstrating the principal characteristics of a particular class of cultural places.

The building demonstrates the principal characteristics of a large timber hotel built on a prominent corner to attract regular custom. It was built as superior accommodation to attract business and family visitors. It remains substantially intact, and is a good example of its type in both design and function. It is important in illustrating the principal characteristics of a two-storeyed, single-skin timber hotel of the 1910s in rural Queensland.

The Grand Hotel is an example of the work of architect William Munro who was a notable architect in North Queensland and in its detailing, such as decorative fretwork and fanlights, displays elements characteristic of his architectural style.

The place is important because of its aesthetic significance.

The Grand Hotel with its verandahs and arched valances demonstrates the aesthetic qualities usually associated with Queensland hotels. As the largest and most visually dominant building in the town of Hughenden, The Grand Hotel has a landmark quality that helps to define not only the township, but the western region.
