= George Clarke (prospector) =

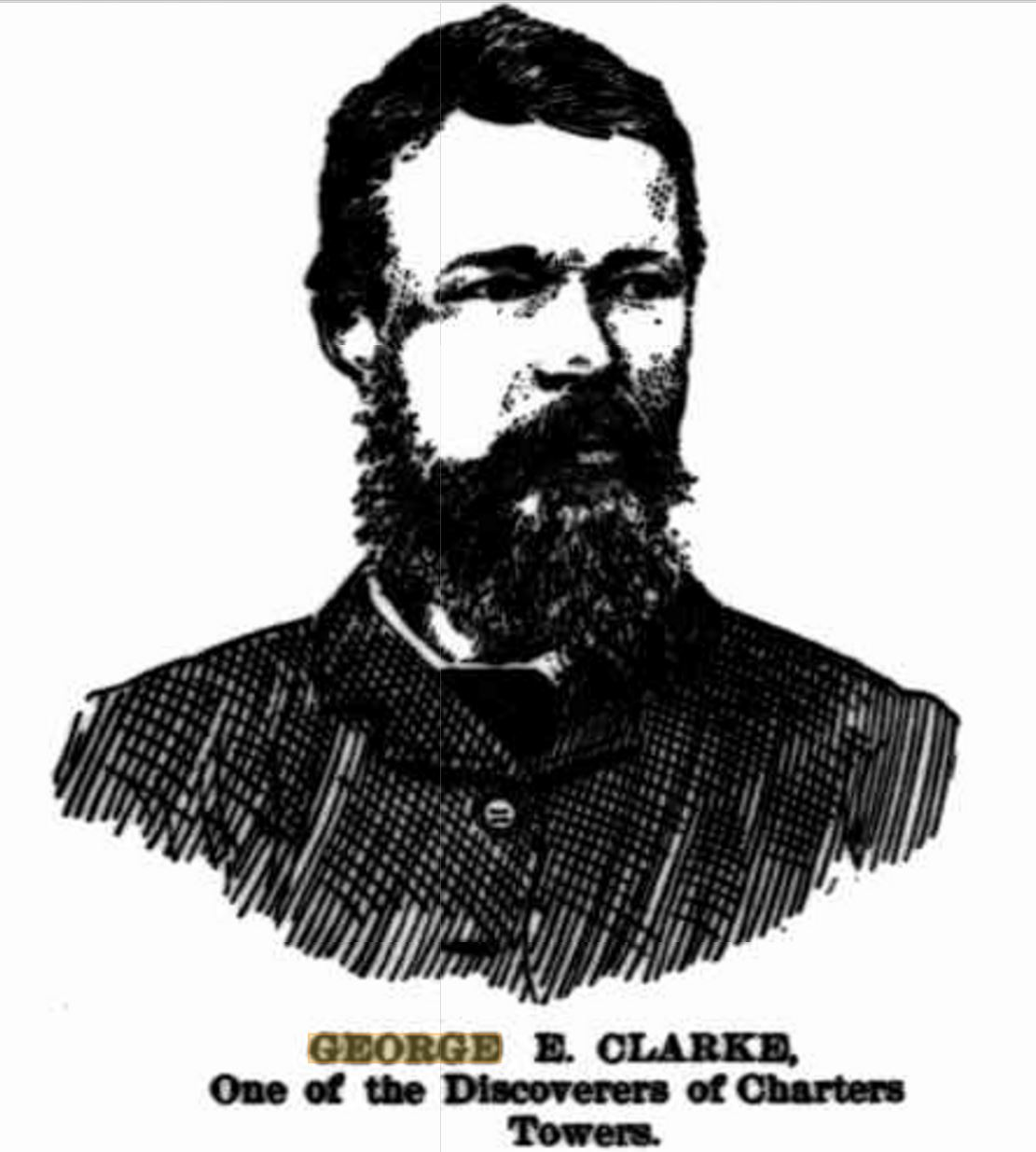
George E. Clarke, 1895

George Edward Clarke (1846–1895) was a prospector in Queensland, Australia. He was a member of the expedition that found gold at Charters Towers.

== Early life ==
George E. Clarke was born near Camden, New South Wales, in May 1846.

Clarke left for the Riverina when he was 17 years old, where he was engaged in pastoral pursuits for five years. In 1868, he left for Rockhampton attracted by the opportunities of a new colony of Queensland, where he engaged in pastoral pursuits until 1871. During these three years, he took considerable interest in the copper mining in the Mackenzie district.

== Discovery of the Charters Towers gold field ==
Upon hearing glowing reports of the newly opened gold mining district of Ravenswood, he abandoned pastoral pursuits for mining. Midyear, Clarke met Hugh Mosman (who had been engaged in pastoral pursuits on the Mackenzie River) near Broadsound. Mosman had come down through Ravenswood, and his description of the potential of the Ravenswood district intrigued Clarke, so the two agreed that they should work together and meet at Ravenswood in two months time. This arrangement was made over 400 miles away from Ravenswood. Mosman also wanted to include his friend Frazer from Rockhampton. Clarke travelled to Ravenswood, via Clermont, and met Mosman and Frazer at Mount McConnell, 60 miles south of Ravenswood. The party then went on to Ravenswood and prospected that part of the district, but without finding anything encouraging. After prospecting for some time at Ravenswood, the party went westward, prospecting the country. A little gold was obtained, but not as much as they had expected. Both sides of the Burdekin River were carefully examined to no avail.

In December 1871, the party discovered gold at the then-unnamed Charters Towers, camping on what is now known as the North Australian reef. They found payable gold in this reef. Several other reefs were also discovered: Mary, Wyndham, Moonstone, Ophir (afterwards called Contest), Rainbow, St. Patrick, and Day Dawn. The group then discovered other reefs in the area including Washington, Alexandra, and Old Warrior. After a careful surface examination, the party decided to focus on the North Australian, Ophir, and Washington reefs. In January 1872, they applied successfully to the Mining Warden at Ravenswood for three prospecting claims, thus revealing the discovery of gold in the district and triggering a gold rush. A reward of £100 for the discovery of the field was paid to the group. The area was named Charters Towers, after William Skelton Ewbank Melbourne Charters, the Mining Warden at Ravenswood, and "towers," a corruption of the West English word "tors" meaning "small hills."

The surface stone from their claims alone yielded 1600oz of gold. The first parcel of 50 tons was crashed at the Broughton, and yielded over 5oz to the ton. This crushing was one of the first three that came off the field. The North Australian for a long time crushed regularly from 4oz to 5oz to the ton. The Washington was a more disappointing reef, but still a lot of gold was obtained from it.

== Mining in the Herberton district ==
Clarke remained in Charters Towers for several years after its discovery, holding considerable interests, but in the 1880s he shifted his focus to mining in the Herberton district. About 1896, he was part of group (which included Willie Joss, the discoverer of gold at Eureka Creek) to take up the first claim on the Russell River goldfield. This was very difficult terrain, rough and broken with almost impenetrable scrub with almost continuous rain, but Clarke persisted.

== Prospecting expedition to Papua New Guinea ==
In 1895, Clarke led a prospecting party to Papua New Guinea. They left from Cairns and arrived at the Mambare River mouth around the start of July. Having befriended some natives and purchased canoes, the party set off up the river accompanied by friendly natives in their own canoes who helped the party to pass through the rapids. On 12 July, while approximately 40 miles upriver, they passed through another set of rapids. Clarke was alone in the boat when the natives cut the tow rope and the force of the water pushed Clarke's boat down the river where he was encircled by natives who threw spears at him. Clarke responded by firing his revolver as did other members of his party on the shore. Clarke then dove off the boat to escape, but was hit over the head with a paddle and then speared through his body. The natives looted Clarke's boat, taking his rifles, and then disappeared. The others in Clarke's party went back downstream and met another prospecting group with whom they joined forces in a search for Clarke's body but, due to the rapid currents, his body was never recovered.
