= Holy Trinity Anglican Church, Herberton =

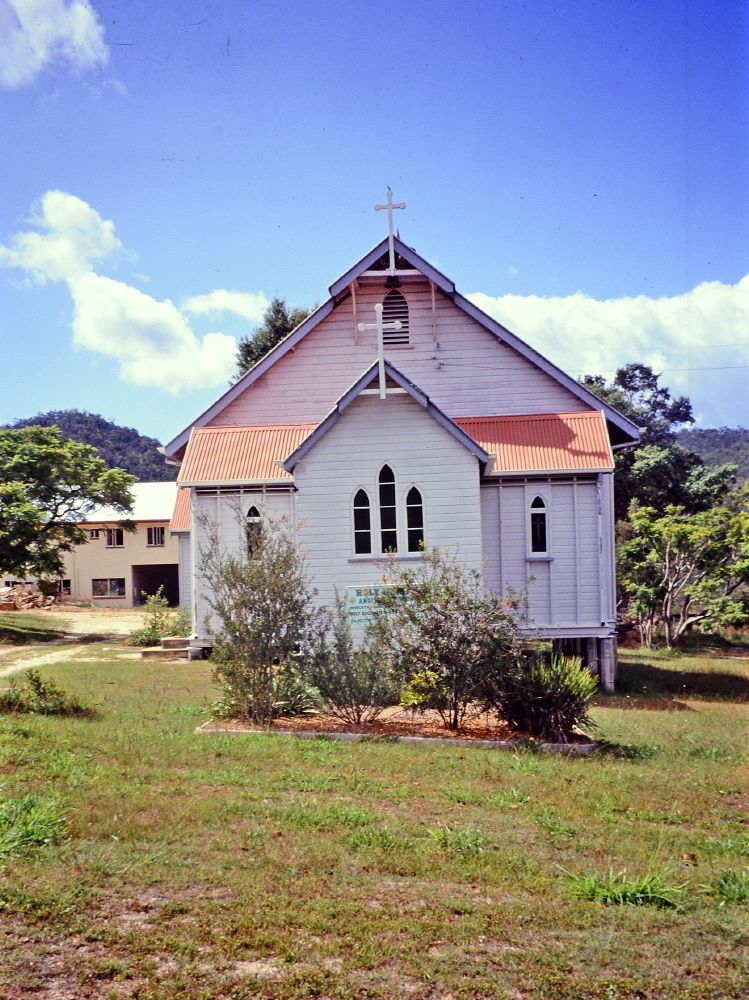
- Holy Trinity Anglican Church, 1992

- Location within Queensland Location within Australia
- 17.3802°S 145.3846°E
- Location: 38 Broadway Street, Herberton, Tablelands Region, Queensland, Australia

History
- Design period: 1870s–1890s (late 19th century)
- Built: 1889

Site notes
- Architect: Eyre & Munro

Queensland Heritage Register
- Official name: Holy Trinity Anglican Church, Holy Trinity Church of England
- Type: state heritage (built)
- Designated: 21 October 1992
- Reference no.: 600538
- Significant period: 1889, 1907 (fabric); 1902–1935 (historical)
- Significant components: memorial – chamber/room, furniture/fittings
- Builders: H Petersen

Holy Trinity Anglican Church is a heritage-listed church at 38 Broadway Street, Herberton, Tablelands Region, Queensland, Australia. It was designed by Eyre & Munro and built in 1889 by H Petersen. It is also known as Holy Trinity Church of England. It was added to the Queensland Heritage Register on 21 October 1992.

== History ==
Holy Trinity church was built in 1889 to serve the Anglican community in the rapidly developing mining town of Herberton and in the surrounding district.

Herberton developed following the 1880 discovery of a substantial tin reef in its vicinity. A rush followed almost immediately and by August 1880, when the town of Herberton (named because of its proximity to the Wild River, the head of the Herbert River) was laid out, it already had a hotel, a butcher's shop, and three stores. The tin fields around Herberton and the other towns which sprang up in the district in the early 1880s proved to be the richest discovered on the Australian mainland.

The first Church of England incumbent in Herberton was the Reverend G. White, who arrived in 1887. Services were held in the small towns of Herberton, Watsonville and Irvinebank and occasionally in other places in the district. A "ruinous" iron building already on church land was repaired for use as a Sunday School and in 1888 plans for a church were drawn up by the Townsville architectural firm of Eyre and Munro. Walter Eyre was an architect, engineer and surveyor. He trained in England and worked in the office of his cousin, FDG Stanley, from 1881 until he was appointed City Engineer of Townsville in 1885. In 1887 he left to set up in practice as an architect and soon gained enough work to take on William Henry Allan Munro as a junior partner. The firm supervised the work of southern architects as well as designing buildings and were responsible for a number of major works in north Queensland before the firm ceased operations in 1892. The contractor for the work was H Petersen and the completed church was dedicated on Trinity Sunday, 30 June 1889. It was a simple rectangular building with a small entry porch on the western end.

In 1898 the Herberton parish included the towns of Herberton, Atherton, Watsonville, Montalbion, Irvinebank and Thornborough. Coolgarra and Mount Garnet were added in 1900, although Holy Trinity remained the only church in the parish. The area was isolated, roads poor and transport was by horse. This placed a difficult burden on the rector and the church had many changes of incumbent in its first years. The problem of providing pastoral care to a large and sparsely settled area led to the foundation of the Brotherhood of St Barnabas (one of the orders of the Bush Brothers). The Brotherhood was established on 11 June 1902 by Aneurin Vaughan Williams, Rector of Herberton. Originally consisting only of Vaughan Williams and one other priest, it was modelled on the Brotherhood of St Andrew founded in central Queensland a few years earlier. The Brothers travelled where they were needed and remained unmarried during the two years of their term of service. They gained considerable respect for their work and in 1908, George Frodsham, Bishop of North Queensland, gave the movement impetus by recruiting in England with the appeal "O for a band of men that will preach like apostles, ride like cowboys, and having food and raiment, will therewith be content", appealing to the sense of adventure in many who became Brothers. Herberton was the Brotherhoods's headquarters and they built a small community house there which has since been removed.

In 1907 a vestry was built and in 1919 a new porch was added to the church and electric light installed. In 1914 the work of the Brothers was extended by the establishment of a school for boys at the instigation of Bishop John Feetham, himself once a Bush Brother and an immensely popular bishop who was locally canonised after his death. This school closed in 1916 and became a refectory for the now vanished St Mary's School, founded in 1918 by Miss Amelia Grace Eckley Philpott. In the 1920s a number of improvements were made to the church and it gained several fine pieces with carving by Miss Philpott, including the baptismal font, altar and a sanctuary chair and table. Miss Philpott later professed as a Sister of the Sacred Advent and was known as Sister Rosa. She died in 1928 and a Children's Corner chapel was created in 1929, in a section of the porch opposite the main entrance of Holy Trinity, as a memorial to her.

The Brotherhood relinquished care of the Herberton church around 1935 and were replaced by a married rector. The parish is now centred on Atherton and the rector lives there serving several small centres in the district, including Herberton. Renovations to Holy Trinity were carried out in 1989 to mark its centenary.

== Description ==
Holy Trinity Church is located next to Woodleigh Residential College, a Uniting Church complex, and diagonally across the road from the Roman Catholic church at Herberton.

The church is a single-storeyed timber building with exposed framing and is set on concrete stumps. The gabled roof is clad with corrugated iron and a small projection at the front shelters a bell hung below the eaves. The building has a large central nave, with a lower T-shaped plan entry at the front, and the front gable walls have chamferboard cladding. A detached vestry, entered through an arched door, is located at the rear corner of the church. In recent years, a toilet has been inserted in the space between this and the sanctuary.

The church has lancet windows, with a triple lancet assembly in the front wall, ridge ventilators, and decorative timber work to the gable ends.

Internally, the church has king post trusses with diagonal struts and the roof is lined with timber boarding on the rake. Walls are lined with horizontal boarding, and a shallow pointed arch frames and separates the raised sanctuary from the nave. The church retains its pews and the baptismal font, altar and a chair and table in the sanctuary feature richly carved panels.

== Heritage listing ==
Holy Trinity Anglican Church was listed on the Queensland Heritage Register on 21 October 1992 having satisfied the following criteria.

The place is important in demonstrating the evolution or pattern of Queensland's history.

Holy Trinity church illustrates the development of Herberton and of the Anglican Church in Queensland. It was the foundation church for the Brotherhood of St Barnabas, which was formed to address the problem of reaching small and isolated communities which could not support a resident priest.

The place is important in demonstrating the principal characteristics of a particular class of cultural places.

Holy Trinity church is a good example of a rural timber church and in its form, scale and detail makes a substantial contribution to the built character of Herberton.

The place is important because of its aesthetic significance.

Holy Trinity church is a good example of a rural timber church and in its form, scale and detail makes a substantial contribution to the built character of Herberton.

The place has a strong or special association with a particular community or cultural group for social, cultural or spiritual reasons.

Holy Trinity church has a strong connection with the Anglican community of Herberton and the surrounding area. It also has a special association with the work of the Brotherhood of St Barnabas in providing pastoral care to the developing Tablelands.
