= Townsville School of Arts =

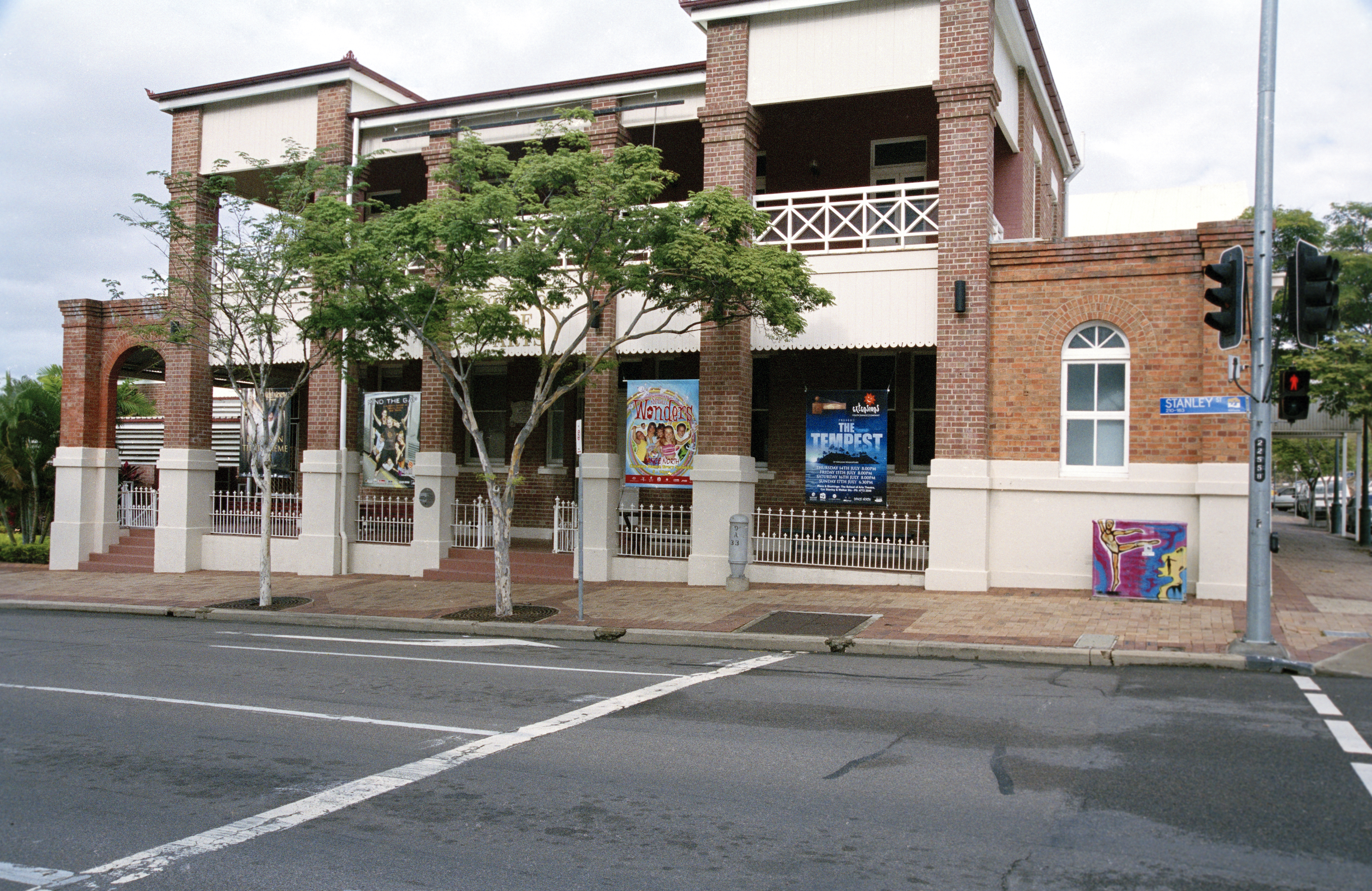
- Townsville School of Arts, 2005

- Location within Queensland Location within Australia
- 19.2603°S 146.8137°E
- Location: Stanley Street, Townsville CBD, City of Townsville, Queensland, Australia

History
- Design period: 1870s–1890s (late 19th century)
- Built: 1891

Site notes
- Architect: Eyre & Munro
- Architectural style: Classicism

Queensland Heritage Register
- Official name: Townsville School of Arts, Dance North, Townsville Arts Centre
- Type: state heritage (built)
- Designated: 21 October 1992
- Reference no.: 600925
- Significant period: 1890s–1930s (historical); 1890s–1900s (fabric); 1890s–1930s (social)
- Significant components: School of Arts
- Builders: James Smith

Townsville School of Arts is a heritage-listed former school of arts (Note: Schools of Arts were known throughout much of Australia, outside Queensland, as Mechanics' institutes. In Britain too, where they originated, most were called Mechanics' institutes. The names varied in many places, however. The founding institute of the movement, formed in 1821, was called the Edinburgh School of Arts.) and now community cultural centre at Stanley Street, Townsville CBD, City of Townsville, Queensland, Australia. It was designed by Eyre & Munro and built in 1891 by James Smith. It is also known as Dancenorth Theatre and Townsville Arts Centre. It was added to the Queensland Heritage Register on 21 October 1992.

== History ==
The School of Arts building was designed by Townsville architects Eyre and Munro. It was constructed by local builder James Smith and opened in May 1891. The first Mechanic's Institutes or Schools of Arts were established in Britain in the early 1800s and were intended to assist self improvement and to promote moral, social and intellectual growth, by providing lectures, discussions and lending libraries to a rising middle class. At the time there were no free public libraries and books were expensive, so that access to books by borrowing as subscribers provided an important service. The first School of Arts committee in Queensland was established in Brisbane in 1849 with the aim of "the advancement of the community in literary, philosophic and scientific subjects". As towns and districts became established, local committees were formed to set up schools of arts, which became one of the principal sources of adult education. The government recognised this by making land available, subsidising books and assisting with building costs. Most Schools of Arts also had a hall with a stage which could be hired, thus encouraging the arts as well as providing a source of revenue.

The first School of Arts committee met in Townsville in 1866 and comprised a number of leading citizens including the town's founders, Captain Robert Towns and John Melton Black. Townsville had been established only two years previously as a port and commercial centre for the pastoral industry north of the Burdekin. It was gazetted as a port of entry in 1865 and grew quickly. The School of Arts began modestly in a small rented cottage with a foundation library of 30 books. It soon moved to larger premises, but did not acquire a permanent home until 1877 when a substantial building was constructed on a reserve granted for the purpose on Melton Hill. Gradually the business heart of the city moved westward so that by 1889 it was believed that the School of Arts on Melton Hill was too far from the centre of town.

The Melton Hill property was sold to the Queensland Government for conversion to a court building and a new site was purchased on the corner of Stanley and Walker Streets. A design competition was held for the new building and was won by Townsville architects Eyre and Munro. Walter Eyre was an architect, engineer and surveyor. He trained in England and arriving in Brisbane in 1880, worked in the office of his cousin, FDG Stanley, from 1881 until he was appointed City Engineer of Townsville in 1885. In 1887 he left to set up in practice as an architect and soon gained enough work to take on WHA Munro as a junior partner. The firm supervised the work of southern architects as well as designing buildings and were responsible for a number of major works in north Queensland before the firm ceased operations in 1892. Their design for the School of Arts was constructed by local builder James Smith and was opened in May 1891 with a debutante ball on opening night and a concert on the 27 May.

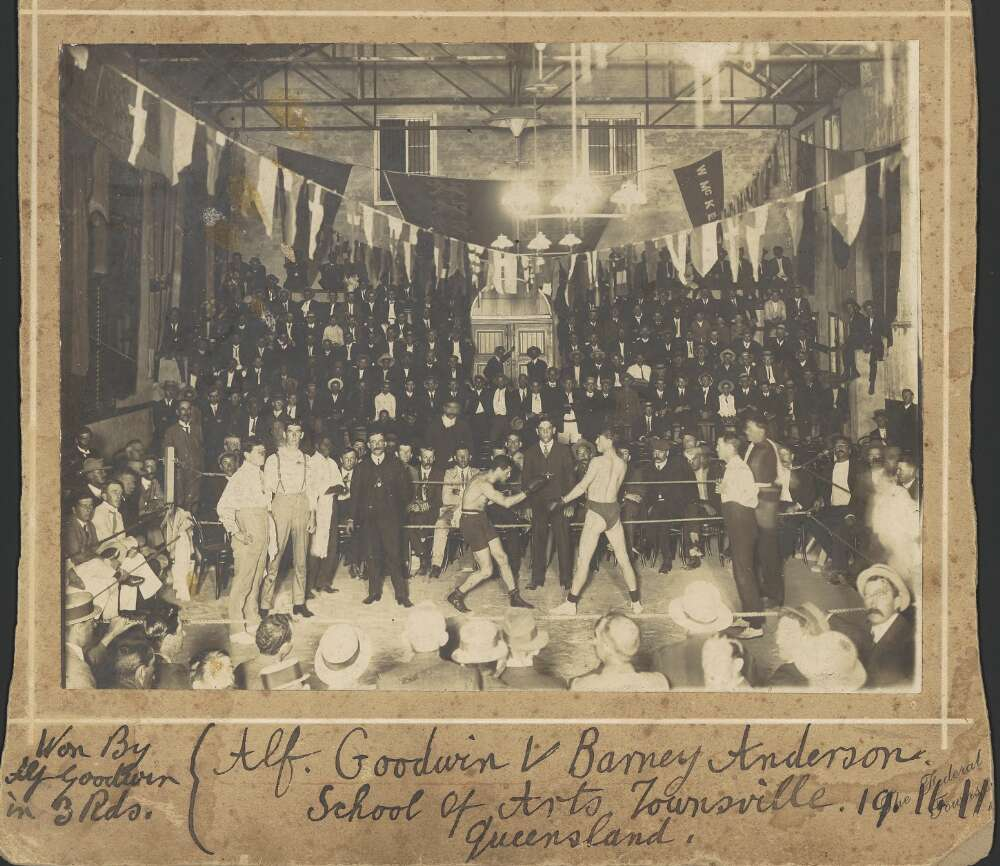
Boxing match of Alf Goodwin versus Barney Anderson at the School of Arts, 1911

The new building had meeting rooms and class rooms on the ground floor with a large library above. Classes were held in such subjects as drawing, singing and woodwork. The first gas cooking classes in Townsville were held here in 1895 utilising a specially installed Darren gas cooker. Connected to this building was a theatre building, originally called Her Majesty's, which could seat 600 people. This was a large rectangular space rising to 2 storey height with a stage flanked by extensions housing dressing rooms. It was used by many visiting theatrical groups and performers, including a Chinese Opera company in 1894. It was the town's leading theatrical venue until the second Theatre Royal opened in 1900, although it continued to be popular after this, Nellie Melba appearing at the theatre in 1909. His Majesty's (as it was later renamed when King Edward VII succeeded Queen Victoria) was also the venue for the first Aboriginal stage performance in Townsville when a variety company, formed by local Aborigines performed there in 1907. Boxing matches were also held there.

The building suffered cyclone damage from Cyclone Sigma in 1896 and again by Cyclone Leonta in 1903 when the offices were unroofed and the theatre was partially demolished. This damage was repaired in 1904 by the architects Tunbridge and Tunbridge. By this time it had become obvious that the theatre was too small and in 1913 the size of the auditorium was increased by an extension at the Walker Street end.

During the Depression the cessation of government subsidies to Schools of Arts spelt the end for many of them. The Townsville School of Arts remained in use until the 1930s, although the verandahs were enclosed and a single storey office building was attached on the Walker Street side between 1929 and 1934. Alternatives for education and leisure activities and the Libraries Act of 1943, which provided for free lending libraries, all contributed to the gradual closure of Schools of Arts around the state.

This change was slightly anticipated Townsville in 1938 when the Trustees resigned and vested the assets of the School of Arts in the Townsville City Council as Trustee, creating the first free public lending library in Australia. In 1941 the building was requisitioned by the Defence authorities and became the main RAAF postal office for the Pacific region. After the war it became the offices of the newly formed Townsville Regional Electricity Board. They vacated the building in 1963 and the Northern Electricity Authority occupied the building, moving out in 1968. The building then remained vacant for some time.

In the late 1960s the Townsville Arts Centre Association formed and in 1976 the building underwent extensive renovation. It became an arts centre, used as the office of the Pacific Festival (1970–1995) and a base for the Townsville Little Theatre and a community radio station, 4TTT. It is home to the North Queensland Ballet and Dance Co Ltd commonly known as Dance North. Further work to the building was carried out in the 1990s during which the upper verandah was reinstated.

In 2016, the building is known as the SOA (School of Arts) Theatre and is home to Dancenorth.

== Description ==
The Townsville School of Arts building is located on the corner of Stanley and Walker Streets and comprises a two-storey structure with an adjoining theatre building running parallel to its rear and accessed from Walker Street and from within the School of Arts building.

Both buildings are constructed of exposed face brick and are roofed in corrugated iron. The former School of Arts building is two storeys high and is fronted on the Stanley Street elevation by brick columns, square in plan, rising from rendered plinths through both storeys to create deep verandahs. The verandah at street level is reached by low steps and has decorative iron railings and matching gates. The front entrance is through double doors flanked by sash windows. The upper floor has cross-braced timber balustrading to the verandah above a deep timber valance. The verandah is accessed by French doors with transom lights above. The ground floor houses offices, toilet facilities, lobbies and the main foyer. A timber staircase gives access from the foyer to the first floor which is divided into two sections by an arch and which it is intended to use as dance space.

The single storey extension at the corner of Stanley and Walker Streets is also brick and is similar in style and finish to the main building. The opposite side of the Stanley Street elevation has a brick arch which leads onto a passageway.

The theatre is a large rectangular building divided into bays externally by shallow brick piers. There is an entrance onto Walker Street and the rear has large doors which were designed to allow for the movement of scenery and large props. Inside, the building has a large auditorium with a timber floor and a stage area which has a basement beneath. On the northern side of the building, the dressing room bay has been extended by the construction of a 1960s brick amenities block. This has been modified as dressing rooms and a performers area. On the southern side an extension runs the length of the building and houses the studios and offices of the 4TTT radio station.

== Heritage listing ==
Townsville School of Arts was listed on the Queensland Heritage Register on 21 October 1992 having satisfied the following criteria.

The place is important in demonstrating the evolution or pattern of Queensland's history.

The School of Arts building is important as part of the network of Schools of Arts which sprang up in any town of consequence in Queensland during the 19th and early 20th centuries and were a measure of prosperity and progress. The scale, material and form of the building amply demonstrate the wealth and importance of Townsville as a regional centre at this period. Schools of Arts were community based and played a valuable educational and social role in the dissemination of information and the provision of facilities for lectures and meetings and the staging of events such as balls, plays and concerts. They were an important stage in the development of adult education in Queensland.

The place is important in demonstrating the principal characteristics of a particular class of cultural places.

It is a good example of a School of Arts building in a major regional centre, originally comprising a library, meeting rooms and a theatre designed to provide the facilities for a wide range of community cultural events and needs.

The place is important because of its aesthetic significance.

As a prominent and well designed building, the Townsville School of Arts makes an important contribution to the built character of Townsville in form, scale, material and because of its location close to the town centre.

The place has a strong or special association with a particular community or cultural group for social, cultural or spiritual reasons.

The School of Arts building is important for its connection with the community of Townsville and the surrounding district as an integral part of the social and community life of the town.

The place has a special association with the life or work of a particular person, group or organisation of importance in Queensland's history.

The Townsville School of Arts building is a major work of the North Queensland architectural firm of Eyre and Munro.
