= Jupiter Mosman =

Aboriginal Australian prospector (1861–1945)

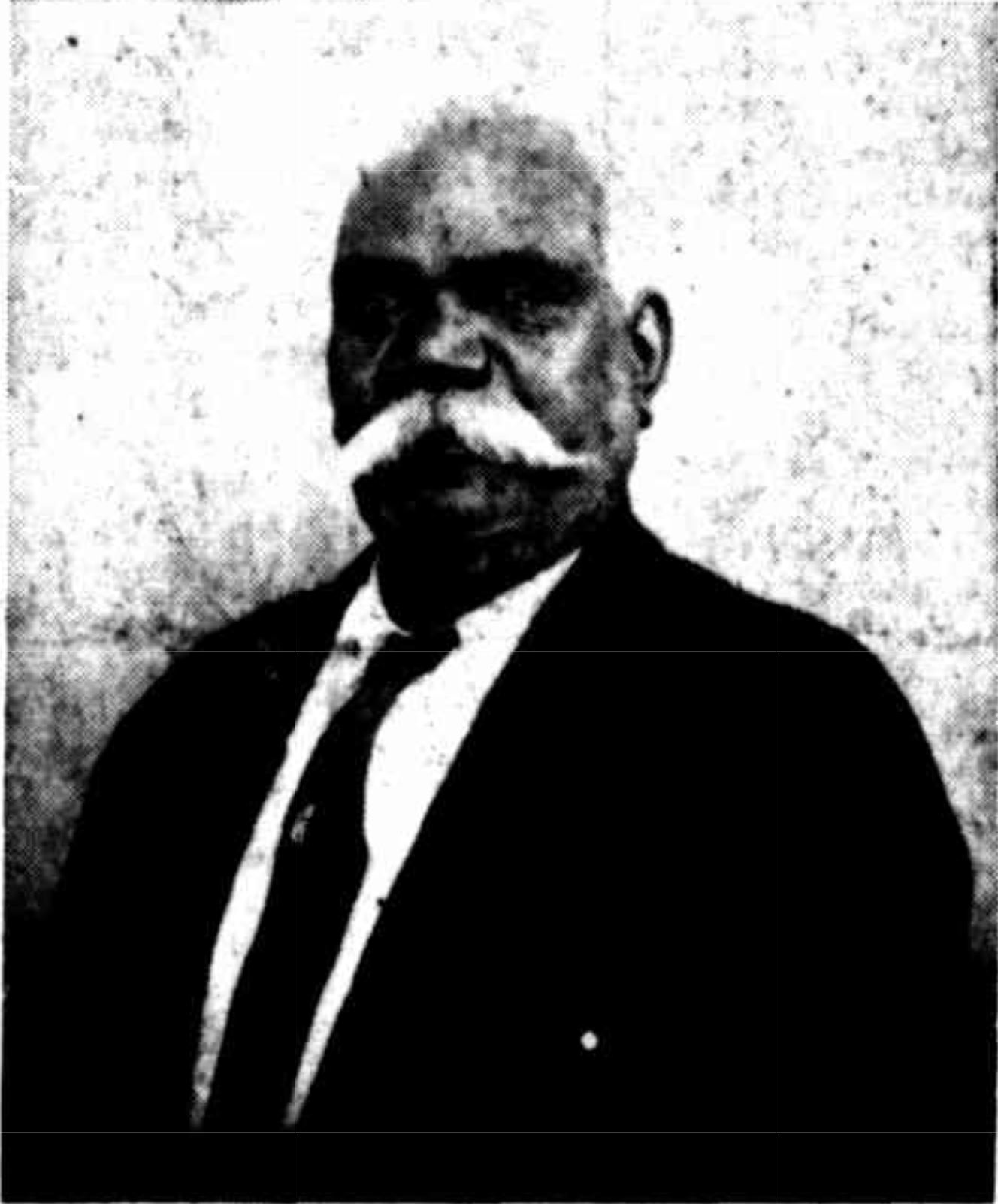
Jupiter Mosman, a few months prior to his death in 1945

John Joseph (Jupiter) Mosman (1861–1945) was an Aboriginal Australian prospector, one of the group of four who discovered gold at Charters Towers, Queensland, Australia. It became one of the premier goldfields of Australia, yielding £23,000,000 worth of gold. Mosman is credited with having found the first gold-bearing stone.

== Early life ==
Mosman was born about 1861 in North-Western Queensland. His tribal name is unknown. As a small boy, he came to Kynuna Station. In the late 1860s, pastoralist Hugh Mosman of Tarbrax Station visited Kynuna and liked the boy so much that Hugh Mosman arranged for the boy to come to live at Tarbrax with him. He was named Jupiter by Hugh Mosman because his eyes were "large, luminous, and as limpid as a planet". He became known as Jupiter Mosman and acted as Hugh Mosman's servant.

== Prospecting ==
There had been discoveries of gold at Ravenswood and other places in North Queensland. Hugh Mosman decided to search for gold, selling Tarbrax to Duncan McIntyre of Dalgonally. Having travelled to Ravenswood with Jupiter, Hugh Mosman became acquainted with the prospector George Clarke and together with a Mr Fraser commenced a prospecting expedition in 1871. The party left Ravenswood working their way toward the Seventy Mile Pinnacle at Mount Leyshon, after which they swung back towards the high bluff, now known as Towers Hill, as it was an easily seen landmark. As they rode through the "Gap", camping on a creek on what is now the town side of the hill, Mosman was attracted by a stone in which he saw "color". The party soon realised that the ground was covered in gold-bearing brownstone quartz. They staked out a mining claim called "The North Australian" and found £6000 worth of gold on the surface. On 2 January 1872 they returned to Ravenswood where they formally registered their claim. This triggered a gold rush to what is now Charters Towers.

== Education ==
Hugh Mosman and his white companions made much money from the Charters Towers gold fields, but soon went their separate ways. Hugh Mosman stayed longest but, after he lost his arm while using explosives, decided to retire to Sydney, taking Jupiter with him. There Jupiter was sent to school in Newtown, and afterwards to Lyndhurst College, Sydney, where he was baptised as Roman Catholic and christened John Joseph. There he did well at sports such as cricket, football and running. At cricket, he was a medium fast bowler, a good fielder, and a sound batsman. He could run 100 yards in 11 seconds. Hugh Mosman was a keen horseman who enjoyed competing in steeplechase races. He taught Jupiter how to ride and about horse racing more generally. They rarely opened a gate, preferring to jump their horses over it.

== Pastoral work ==
After Jupiter had completed his schooling, Hugh Mosman and Jupiter returned to Charters Towers. When Hugh Mosman left Charters Towers in 1891, Jupiter decided he would join Hugh Mosman's nephew as a drover, taking a mob of cattle owned by Messrs Collins and White from Beaudesert near Kynuna to Wodonga in Victoria. The journey took six months and five days and no beasts were lost.

Later Mosman worked for Messrs Rourke and Monroe at Lolwoth Station at Dotswood. He worked at a number of other pastoral stations, including Wombiana, and Stockyard Creek with Messrs Soilleux and Roberts.

When he had the opportunity, Mosman went prospecting and is credited with discovering other mineral-bearing areas.

== Later life ==
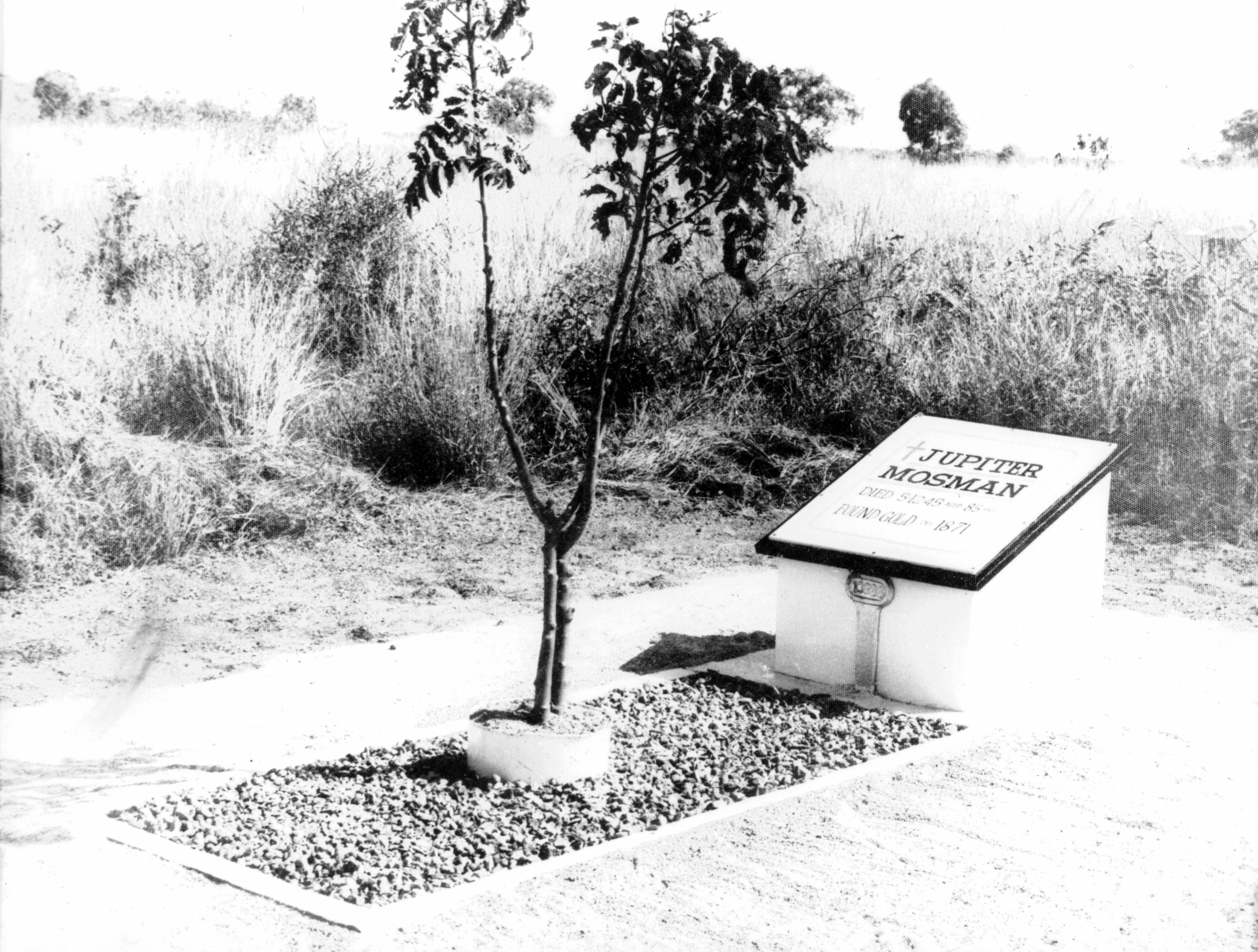
Grave of Mosman, Charters Towers Cemetery

In his final years, Mosman was cared for at the Eventide Home nursing home in Charters Towers. Aboriginal people were not normally admitted to the home, but the people of Charters Towers successfully petitioned the Queensland Government to allow him residence there because of his historic association with Charters Towers.

Mosman died at Eventide nursing home at Charters Towers on 5 December 1945 aged approximately 84 years. His funeral took place on 6 December 1945.

He was one of the only two men remaining alive who were on Charters Towers in its beginnings, the other being Sir Thomas Buckland, who was then an assayer at Millchester.

== Legacy ==
In December 1953, a large rock monument honouring Mosman as the founder of Charters Towers was unveiled in the front yard of Syd N. Williams opposite the Charters Towers Hospital. The unveiling was conducted by local Aboriginal leader King Kiara, son of Barney, of the Dalleburra people, who wore his breastplate for the occasion.

A large boomerang-shaped monument was erected in memory of Mosman in Lissner Park, Charters Towers (20.073586°S 146.260456°E).

The Jupiter Mosman Cooperative Society provide accommodation services for Indigenous people in Charters Towers.

Jupiters Casino, afterwards known as The Star Gold Coast, was named after him.

== See also ==
- List of Indigenous Australian historical figures
