= Hugh Mosman =

Australian politician

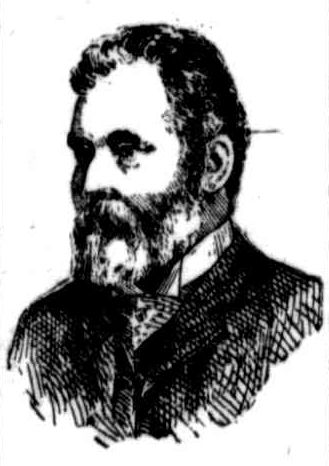
- Hugh Mosman

Member of the Queensland Legislative Council
- In office June 1891 – January 1905

Personal details
- Born: Hugh Mosman; 11 February 1843 Mosman Bay, Sydney
- Died: 15 November 1909 (aged 66) Toowong, Queensland
- Parent(s): Archibald Mosman; Harriet née Farquharson
- Occupation: Mine owner

Hugh Mosman (11 February 1843 – 15 November 1909) was a mine owner and politician in Queensland, Australia. He discovered gold in Charters Towers. He was a Member of the Queensland Legislative Council.

== Early life ==
Mosman was born on 11 February 1843 in Mosman, New South Wales. Merchant Archibald Mosman (1799–1863) was his father, and his mother was Harriet née Farquharson Hugh received his education at The King's School in North Parramatta, New South Wales.

Mosman initially aspired to be a pastoralist, but failed to establish a successful career and was left broke. He visited Queensland in 1860, hoping to acquire properties there; this was also unsuccessful. Mosman decided then to try his hand at prospecting. He spent the next ten years mining, and in 1870 he revisited Queensland, choosing to work in Ravenswood.

== Gold ==
On 24 December 1871, Mosman was travelling with miners George Clark, James Fraser, and his servant, Jupiter Mosman, attempting to locate missing horses. After he found them, Jupiter located some shining gold nestled in a creek. Mosman named the place where the gold had been located Charters Towers (Charters Tors) after the gold mining warden W. S. E. M. Charters. After Jupiter's discovery was reported in January 1872, Ravenswood's population blossomed to around 30,000 people. The discovery prompted a gold rush in north of Queensland.

Mosman's life was largely simple from that point forward. In 1882, Mosman's left forearm was blown off by dynamite, which had exploded earlier than it was supposed to. Mosman remained generally reclusive up until June 1891, when he became a member of the Queensland Legislative Council. He did not give many speeches, and they were noted as being "conservative and unremarkable". He resigned in January 1905.

== Later life ==
In retirement, Mosman pursued his interest in horse racing, owning a number of horses. His horse Balfour won the Queensland Turf Club Derby in 1902. In 1899, Mosman purchased a 300-acre farm in Auckland, New Zealand, where he bred race horses.

In the final months of his life, he was not in good health. However, on Saturday 13 November 1909, Mosman went to Eagle Farm Racecourse for the Derby race, but was forced to return home after the first race feeling ill. On the following Monday 15 November, he was at his residence Easton Gray, Soudan Street, Toowong, Brisbane, when he drank a glass of milk and died. He was buried in Toowong Cemetery on 16 November 1909.

He never married but was well-connected through his sisters Harriette (second wife of Queensland Premier Thomas McIlwraith) and Cecilia (wife of Queensland Premier Arthur Hunter Palmer). He and left over £70,000 to his relatives, much of it to his nephew Cecil Palmer.

== Legacy ==
Mosman's farm in Auckland was sold to investors in December 1910, eventually becoming the modern-day South Auckland suburb of Favona.

A street in Charters Towers was named after him.

Mosman Park, a suburb in Charters Towers, is named after him.

The Mossman River was named by the explorer George Dalrymple on 6 December 1873. Dalrymple wrote "I named this river the Mossman River, after Mossman, an explorer and mining man, member of a very prominent mining family". The town of Mossman takes its name from the river.

The house Easton Gray (home of the Palmer family) and its 18 acres of land was sold in 1944 to construct Toowong High School, now Queensland Academy for Science, Mathematics and Technology.

== See also ==
Contemporaries in the Queensland Legislative Council

- Members of the Queensland Legislative Council, 1890–1899
- Members of the Queensland Legislative Council, 1900–1909

== Sources ==
- Appleton, Richard (1983). The Australian Encyclopaedia. Grolier Society of Australia. ISBN 978-0-9596604-2-5. Archived from the original on 3 January 2014.
- The Australian encyclopaedia. Michigan State University Press. 1958.
- "Charters Towers Story". Citigold. Archived from the original on 4 March 2012.
- Bolton, G.C. (1979). "Mosman, Hugh (1843–1909)". Australian Dictionary of Biography. National Centre of Biography, Australian National University. ISBN 978-0-522-84459-7. ISSN 1833-7538. OCLC 70677943.
- Peach, John (2008). The Biggest Ever Gold-mining Swindle in the Colonies. Interactive Publications. ISBN 978-1-876819-77-4.
- Stephen, M.D. (1979). "Mosman, Archibald (1799–1863)". Australian Dictionary of Biography. National Centre of Biography, Australian National University. ISBN 978-0-522-84459-7. ISSN 1833-7538. OCLC 70677943.
- St. Louis, Regis; Gilbert, Sarah; Le Nevez, Catherine; Pozzan, Olivia (1 March 2012). Lonely Planet Queensland & the Great Barrier Reef. Lonely Planet. ISBN 978-1-74220-654-7. Archived from the original on 3 January 2014.
- "World History". Charters Towers Regional Council. Archived from the original on 6 April 2011.
