= Queensland National Bank, Charters Towers =

Queensland National Bank
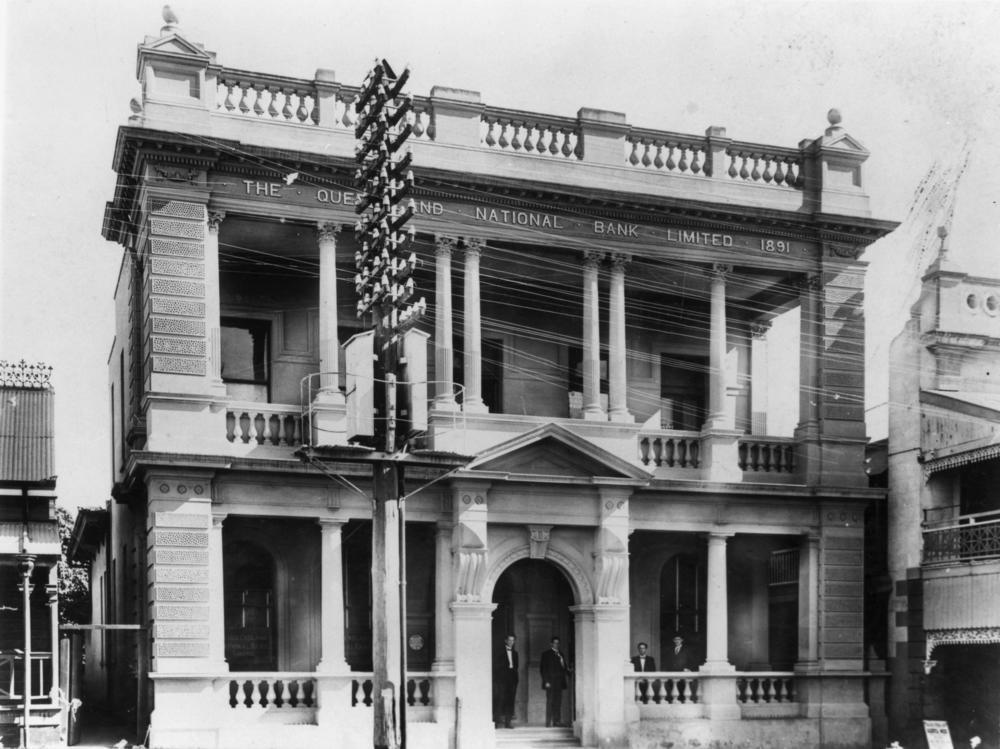
- Queensland National Bank, circa 1920

- Location within Queensland
- 20.0757°S 146.2569°E
- Location: 72 Mosman Street, Charters Towers City, Charters Towers, Charters Towers Region, Queensland, Australia

History
- Design period: 1870s–1890s (Late 19th century)
- Built: 1891–1949, Queensland National Bank (former), Charters Towers (1891)

Site notes
- Architect: Francis Drummond Greville Stanley
- Architectural style: Classicism

Queensland Heritage Register
- Official name: Queensland National Bank (former); City Hall (former)
- Type: state heritage
- Designated: 26 June 2020
- Reference no.: 650251
- Type: Commercial/financial/professional: Bank
- Theme: Developing secondary and tertiary industries: Financing; Maintaining order: Government and public administration

Queensland National Bank is a heritage-listed former bank building at 72 Mosman Street, Charters Towers City, Charters Towers, Charters Towers Region, Queensland, Australia. It was designed by Francis Drummond Greville Stanley and built from 1891 to 1949. It is also known as the Charters Towers' City Hall. It was added to the Queensland Heritage Register on 26 June 2020.

== History ==
The Queensland National Bank building was built in 1891 in Charters Towers, a city located approximately 107 km southwest of Townsville in North Queensland. It replaced an earlier 1880 timber bank building and was designed by prominent Queensland architect, Francis Drummond Greville (FDG) Stanley, at the peak of the Charters Towers gold rush. The grand masonry building expressed the confidence and wealth of Charters Towers at the time. When the bank was closed in the early 1940s, it became a workers' club established by the Trades and Labour Council. This was not a success and in 1948, the property was acquired by the Charters Towers City Council and used as the City Hall, relocating from the earlier town hall in Gill Street. It continues to be a centre for local government administration.

Charters Towers forms part of the traditional land of the Gudjal people. It was established after gold was discovered at the foot of Towers Hill in December 1871 by Jupiter Mosman and Hugh Mosman, leading to the proclamation of the Charters Towers Goldfield on 31 August 1872. The settlement began with a number of shops and hotels along a track, which became Mosman Street, with the population reputedly 3000 by August 1872. In 1877 the 1 square mile (2.6 km^{2}) comprising Charters Towers, centred on Mosman Street, was declared a municipality, the Town of Charters Towers. In 1907 Charters Towers was proclaimed a city.

In the 1880s, Charters Towers continued to prosper and grow, becoming the most productive goldfield in Queensland. The completion of the Great Northern railway line from Townsville to Charters Towers in December 1882 boosted the town's prosperity, by lowering the cost of supplies and building materials. Procurement of gold from the deep seams of Charters Towers required substantial machinery to crush quartz and sink shafts. This required working capital to finance machinery and to pay the wages of workers employed on these time consuming processes. The Queensland Gold Fields Act 1874 and Gold Mining Companies Act 1875 allowed for combinations of leases, claims and syndicates in order to work their leases at great depths. The legislation also underpinned the establishment of permanent settlement, which would attract capital investment to the field.

With the influx of wealth into North Queensland, several financial institutions recognised that establishing banking facilities in these mining centres would prove profitable, including the Queensland National Bank (QNB). The QNB was the first and most successful of the three Queensland-owned nineteenth-century banks. As the colony's most powerful banking institution, the QNB dominated the Queensland economy. It was established in March 1872 by an influential group of prominent Queensland squatters, politicians, lawyers, and businessmen who wished to secure development capital free from overseas or inter-colonial control. It commenced trading on 3 June 1872 at its first office in Brisbane. The bank attracted widespread Queensland patronage and branches opened in quick succession. By early in 1874 the bank had 10 branches. In 1878, the QNB opened a branch in London, while one in Sydney opened two years later. In September 1879 Thomas McIlwraith (Queensland Premier 1877–83, 1888, 1893), a director of the QNB, persuaded the Queensland Parliament to confer on it the whole of the Queensland Government's banking business. By 1880, the bank held 40% of the total deposits and advances in Queensland, a higher proportion than any other bank in any Australian colony. Despite financial scandals and a brief suspension of operation during the 1890s, the bank exclusively held the government's account for 42 years, until 1921.

As early as 1872, requests had been made to the QNB's Board of Directors by Charters Towers' residents "inviting them to establish a branch of their bank at Charters Towers". A petition with 800 signatures was sent to the board, which decided to establish a QNB branch in June 1873. A further two branches would be opened; one in the nearby mining settlement of Millchester, and one in Townsville, which served as the mines' port town. The first to open was Charters Towers in July 1873, closely followed by Millchester and Townsville respectively. Other banks in Charters Towers at this time included the Bank of New South Wales (1872) and the Australian Joint Stock Bank (1872), with the QNB purportedly "the most popular, and deservedly so, as but for its assistance, the field could not have attained, for a considerable time longer, such a state of prosperity".

In the early 1880s, the gold mines in Charters Towers continued to have high yields and the town prospered. In the main streets, more substantial structures were built, reflective of the confidence in the town's success at that time. In July 1880, following the QNB's purchase in 1876, of two adjoining lots with frontage to Mosman Street, a new timber bank building had been completed. It was designed by Colonial Architect, Francis Drummond Greville (FDG) Stanley, and built by local contractors, Fraser Brothers. Although not as grand as the masonry QNB building constructed in Townsville in the late 1870s, also designed by Stanley, the new structure was nonetheless an attractive addition to the Mosman Street streetscape, and the Northern Miner claimed "the permanence and stability of Charters Towers appear to rest on as sure a foundation as those of Townsville".

The wealth of the Charters Towers goldfields grew in the following years, particularly following the 1886 Colonial and Indian Exhibition in London where specimens of Charters Towers gold were featured. Almost immediately English investors seized the opportunity to be part of the Charters Towers gold prosperity. Mining companies were formed, managed by Charters Towers' mining agents and share-brokers, and while some shares were held by English interests, many local people prospered through their investments, leading to an expansion of banking facilities and mining exchanges. Banks and gold buyers purchased the gold and minted it into sovereigns in Australia and England. The sovereigns were held in the vaults of banks in Melbourne, London, Berlin, and New York and then shipped to pay international debt.

By 1889, Charters Towers was producing 1/6th of all of Australia's gold, and Queensland became the most productive gold producing colony in Australia. Enormous amounts of gold were purchased by banks such as the QNB, which played a vital role in this process of wealth creation and distribution. At this time, the QNB had 14 branches on the Queensland mining fields. Charters Towers and Gympie were the premier mining branches transacting more than half of the bank's mining business. Their aggregate deposits and advances exceeded £0.5 million, making them highly profitable branches.

By the early 1890s, Charters Towers (known colloquially as "The World") had grown to be the second largest centre in the colony, after Brisbane, with a population of almost 25,000 people. Amidst this optimism, the QNB desired to better reflect its prominence as one of the town's primary banks by having a new, grand bank building constructed. It was hoped it would rival other stately banks that had been constructed in the centre of town, in particular the Bank of New South Wales building in Gill Street, which had been built in 1889. Stanley was engaged to design the new QNB building.

FDG Stanley was a gifted and prolific architect. He was Queensland Colonial Architect between 1873 and 1881, and in 1888 became the inaugural president of the Queensland Institute of Architects. He designed many large and prestigious public and commercial buildings, including a number of banks. These include the Australian Bank of Commerce building in Charters Towers, the Queensland National Bank building in Cooktown, Ipswich & West Moreton Building Society building in Ipswich, the Commonwealth Bank building in Mackay and the Australian Joint Stock Bank building in Maryborough. In early 1891, Stanley accepted the tender from North Queensland building contractors, Spane and Hansen, to erect the new QNB bank building for £4595.

From November 1890, whilst the construction of the building took place, a temporary bank was set up in commercial premises on the corner of Gill and Deane streets. This position was not ideal and it was stated "that any of the junior officers of the Bank will be able to write a brilliant and interesting essay on the odours that arise from the Deane Street open sewer". The QNB's 1880 timber building was sold to the Union Bank of Australia and moved onto the adjacent lot in 1890, then refitted as their bank building.

In the course of its construction, The Queenslander described the QNB's new bank building as "palatial". By December 1891, the new masonry building had been completed and at the time, it was stated that "the building has just been erected at a cost, with the land, of nearly £9000, and is one of the architectural ornaments of the town. It is situated at the corner of Gill and Mosman streets, and therefore occupies a most central position".

QNB's new two storey bank building was depicted in a c. 1895 photograph as a prominent feature of the street, with a symmetrical street elevation and Classical architectural ornamentation. Its street elevation had a central pediment and entry, and colonnaded ground and first floor verandahs, framed by corner pillars inscribed to appear as ashlar. The entablature over the first floor contained "QUEENSLAND NATIONAL BANK LIMITED 1891" in large lettering, and a balustrade parapet concealed the roof from the street. Early plans show the building provided banking facilities on the ground floor, including entrance hall, gold room, manager's office, main banking chamber, stationery room, and a strong room; and the first floor accommodated a manager's residence comprising two bedrooms, drawing room, and a rear verandah with bathroom enclosure.

In 1891 an opportunity to establish a town hall in Charters Towers emerged when Queensland's Postmaster General's Department (PMG) decided to replace the older timber post office on the corner of Gill and Deane streets, with a grander masonry post office, which would include an impressive clock tower. Negotiations between the PMG and the council concluded with an agreement to have the old post office shifted next door to become the town hall. The original municipal chambers building was sited well back from Gill Street, enabling the former post office building to be re-established on the council's property, and in June 1891 "the work in connection with shifting the present post office building on adjoining allotment in front of the Municipal Council Chambers has been commenced". Once modified to suit the purposes of a town hall, this building served the Charters Towers community for the next 50 years.

The QNB retained its prominence as one of the city's major banks in the early twentieth century. The downturn in mining from 1914 and its virtual cessation by 1917 contributed to a steady decrease in population during this time. A town that had boasted a population of 25,000 in 1900, when it was the second largest in Queensland, was reduced to just 13,000 by the end of World War I (WWI). Between 1914 and 1918 more than 900 homes and business premises were removed from Charters Towers. Many were dismantled and transported by train to Townsville or Ayr where they were re-erected. Others were relocated to various places in Western Queensland. Nevertheless, banking institutions remained in town in the interwar period to service the regional rural economy and included the Bank of New South Wales, Bank of Australasia, London Chartered Bank of Australia, Union Bank of Australia, Australian Bank of Commerce and the Queensland National Bank.

By the early 1940s, however, this demand had waned and the Charters Towers QNB branch was closed. This may have been due to the pending merger of the QNB and the National Bank of Australasia in 1947, which already had a branch in Gill Street. In April 1943, it was announced in The Northern Miner that an auction would be held on 30 April 1943, for the sale of the former QNB's interior furnishings, "the whole of the office and bank chairs, tables, linoleums, on bottom floor, in addition to the whole of the superior and useful furniture ... on the top floor (living quarters) of the bank". In May 1943, the sales agent for the property offered it to the Charters Towers City Council as a replacement for the original town hall in Gill Street, however, the council declined, deeming that there were more pressing priorities for ratepayer's money.

The Trades and Labour Council purchased the property for £2000 in 1945 for the establishment of a workers' club, to be named the "John Curtin Memorial Hall" after former Prime Minister John Curtin who had recently died in July 1945. For an annual membership fee of £1, workers and their families could use the club's facilities, which would include a library, reading and rest rooms, refreshment bar (unlicensed, as it had been refused a club licence), billiard table, and a child-minding service in the backyard. This would enable mothers to leave their children in a safe and supervised environment while they shopped. Servicemen and women could attend the club free of charge. The official opening ceremony was held 3 December 1945 amidst great optimism. Ultimately the workers' club was not a success and in February 1948, the property was acquired by the Charters Towers City Council to be used for a new town hall, which would replace the old and dilapidated 1880s town hall in Gill Street.

No alterations were needed to the building's exterior and only slight alterations to the interior, to repurpose it for council administration uses. By mid-1949, the former bank building had become the centre for the city's local government administration and began to be called "City Hall". The lettering to the first floor entablature was subsequently removed and the words "CITY HALL" were added to the central pediment. The building also played host to many community meetings. Its prominent position on historic Mosman Street, with its intact nineteenth-century streetscape, ensured that the City Hall was featured in Charters Towers' tourism information booklets and postcards.

In 2008, the Charters Towers City Council was amalgamated with the Dalrymple Shire Council to form the Charters Towers Regional Council. Some of the council services, once administered in the City Hall, were moved to the Administration Centre at 12 Mosman Street.

The former Queensland National Bank on Mosman Street has played an important role in the history of Charters Towers from the late nineteenth century to the present day. As a highly prominent and grand masonry building at the heart of the city's commercial centre, it plays a vital role as part of its historic streetscape. It demonstrates the dominance and wealth of the town in the late nineteenth and early twentieth centuries as Queensland's premier gold field. In 2020, the building continues to be used by local government administration.

== Description ==
The former Queensland National Bank (1891) is an elaborately detailed, two-storey former bank building, prominently sited on Mosman Street at the head of its T-intersection with Gill Street, the two main streets in the central business district of Charters Towers. The building faces east, directly fronting the street, and is a conspicuous and attractive contributing element in the surrounding townscape, which is characterised by late nineteenth-century masonry buildings. The site is bounded on other sides by a commercial property (retaining the earlier, timber Queensland National Bank building) to the south, Edmeades Park to the north, and Rutherford Lane to the west.

Features of the place of state-level cultural heritage significance are:

- the 1891 bank building
- views of the bank

=== 1891 bank building ===
The Queensland National Bank Building is an intact, substantial masonry structure. Rectangular in plan, the building's front (east) half is two storeys, the rear (west) half is single-storey, and a small single-storey strong room protrudes from the southwest corner of the rear. A single-storey extension (c. 1990s) has been made at the rear and is not of state-level cultural heritage significance.

The front elevation is symmetrical, with a central pediment and main public entrance into the former bank. It features ground and first floor colonnaded verandahs and is ornamented with Classical details. A private entrance into the former bank manager's residence, on the first floor, is accessed via a narrow lane to the south side of the building.

The original interior layout of the ground floor reflects the bank operations, with separate areas and circulation for bank customers, bank employees, and the bank manager's residence. The main entrance is via an ornate central entry hall into the banking chamber, which is a large and impressive room with high ceilings. Accessed from the chamber are the manager's office, and gold room, each with two entrances – one for bank staff and ones for customers. At the rear of the banking chamber are offices, a verandah (now enclosed), and two strong rooms, one of which retains its early vault door and safe. The manager's residence on the first floor is accessed via a private stair hall, which also has a short private hall directly into the banking chamber. The first floor rear verandah has been enclosed (enclosures to both the ground and first floor rear verandahs are not of state-level cultural heritage significance).

There is evidence of modifications made to the building to accommodate its use as City Hall (c. 1948-49). These include alterations to lettering on the Mosman Street elevation, installation of desks and partitions to the ground floor, and modification of finishes and demolition of partitions to form one large space for council chambers to the first floor.

=== Views of the bank ===
The former Queensland National Bank Building is a distinctive and attractive feature of the Charters Towers townscape, contributing to its commercial character of intact nineteenth century buildings. Views of state-level cultural heritage significance to the building are of the front elevation from both Mosman and Gill streets.

== Heritage listing ==
Queensland National Bank was listed on the Queensland Heritage Register on 26 June 2020 having satisfied the following criteria.

The place is important in demonstrating the evolution or pattern of Queensland's history.

The former Queensland National Bank in Charters Towers (1891) is important in demonstrating the development of mining in Charters Towers, a major contributor to Queensland's wealth and its largest gold producer by the 1890s. In its form, fabric, materials and layout, the place illustrates the vital role of financial institutions in the process of wealth creation and distribution on nineteenth-century Queensland goldfields.

The place is an important representative example of a grand masonry bank constructed during the peak period of gold production, when Charters Towers' prosperity was reflected in the erection of more permanent and elaborate buildings in its central business district.

As Charters Towers' City Hall from 1948, the place is important in demonstrating the provision/evolution of local government in Charters Towers, a major regional centre. This is illustrated through early alterations to lettering on the Mosman Street elevation, installation of desks and partitions to the ground floor, and modification of finishes and partitions to form one large space for council chambers on the first floor.

The place is important in demonstrating the principal characteristics of a particular class of cultural places.

The former Queensland National Bank building, designed by renowned architect Francis Drummond Greville (FDG) Stanley, is an excellent representative example of a late nineteenth-century masonry bank building in regional Queensland. Through its intact form, fabric, materials and layout, the place is important in demonstrating the principal characteristics of its type, including its: location in a central business district; prominent street presence with an elaborate and decorative street elevation; masonry construction; high-quality design with Classical architectural treatments and ornamentation; fine interior materials and finishes; and hierarchical layout of rooms comprising a banking chamber, impressive entry hall with elaborate finishes, strong rooms with safe, offices, and private manager's residence with separate entrance.

The place is important because of its aesthetic significance.

The former Queensland National Bank building has aesthetic importance for its expressive and beautiful attributes, and its streetscape contribution. Through its Classically-styled architectural treatments and ornamentation, symmetrical and elegant composition of the main elevation with central pediment and elaborate colonnade, and high quality exterior and interior materials and decorative treatments, the place conveys the concept of financial stability, permanence and prosperity sought by financial institutions of this era. These expressive attributes have been sustained through its civic use as City Hall, Charters Towers' main local government building since 1948.

Visually distinctive and finely composed, the place is a major contributor to its townscape setting, sharing a similar form, scale and materials to a suite of large masonry nineteenth-century buildings in the central business district of Charters Towers. The place features prominently in views from Mosman Street, and important views of the place unfold from Gill Street towards the intersection with Mosman Street.
