= Queensland National Bank, Townsville =

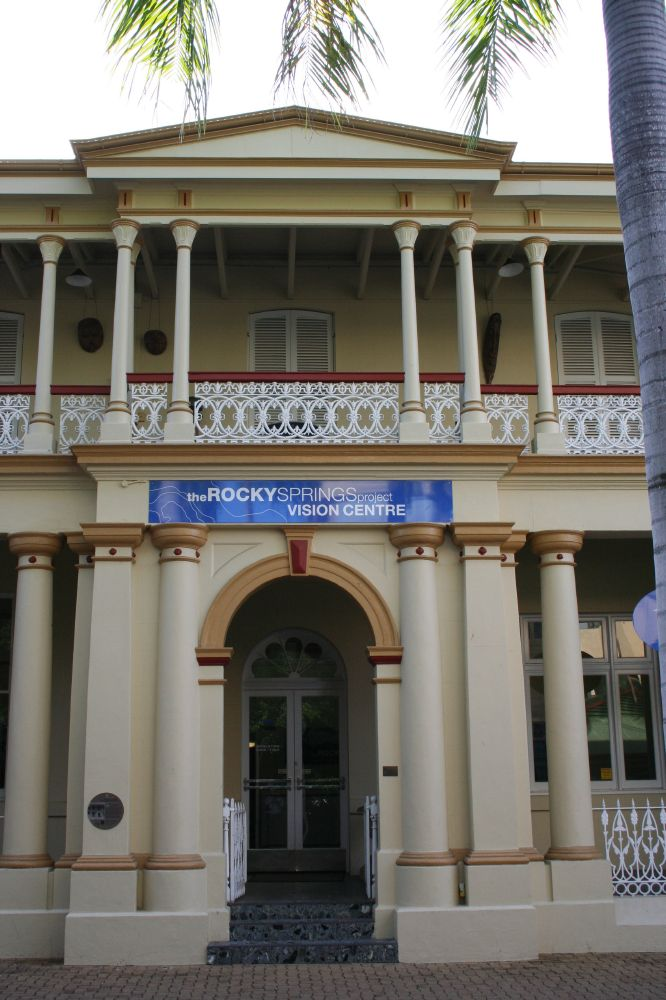
- Queensland National Bank, Townsville, 2009

- Location within Queensland Location within Australia
- 19.2588°S 146.8173°E
- Location: 295–303 Flinders Street, Townsville CBD, City of Townsville, Queensland, Australia

History
- Design period: 1870s–1890s (late 19th century)
- Built: 1878–1879

Site notes
- Architect: Francis Drummond Greville Stanley
- Architectural style: Classicism

Queensland Heritage Register
- Official name: Queensland National Bank (former), Queensland National Bank
- Type: state heritage (built)
- Designated: 28 January 1994
- Reference no.: 600905
- Significant period: 1870s (fabric); 1879–1982 (historical use as a bank)
- Significant components: residential accommodation – manager's house/quarters, banking chamber, strong room
- Builders: C A Ward

Queensland National Bank is a heritage-listed former bank at 295–303 Flinders Street, Townsville CBD, City of Townsville, Queensland, Australia. It was designed by Francis Drummond Greville Stanley and built from 1878 to 1879 by C A Ward. It was added to the Queensland Heritage Register on 28 January 1994.

== History ==
This two-storeyed rendered brick building was erected in 1878–1879 as the Townsville branch of the Queensland National Bank (QNB), on a site acquired by the bank in December 1877. It was erected during the boom which accompanied Townsville's growth in the 1870s as the port for the goldfields centred around Ravenswood and Charters Towers.

The QNB, established in Brisbane in 1872 by a group of prominent Queensland businessmen, flourished during the last quarter of the 19th century. In the 1870s and 1880s it was patronised by Sir Thomas McIlwraith and Sir Arthur Hunter Palmer, and for 42 years, from 1879 until 1921, the QNB held the Queensland Government's banking account. Despite financial scandals and collapse in the early 1890s, the QNB contributed substantially to the development of North Queensland, lending generously to mining, pastoral and sugar interests. It was the third bank to establish a branch in Townsville, in a small timber cottage in 1873. In 1875, the QNB purchased a site in Wickham Street, on which larger premises were erected in 1876. This building was destroyed by fire in 1877, following which the bank operated from temporary rented premises until the present Flinders Street building was completed in 1879.

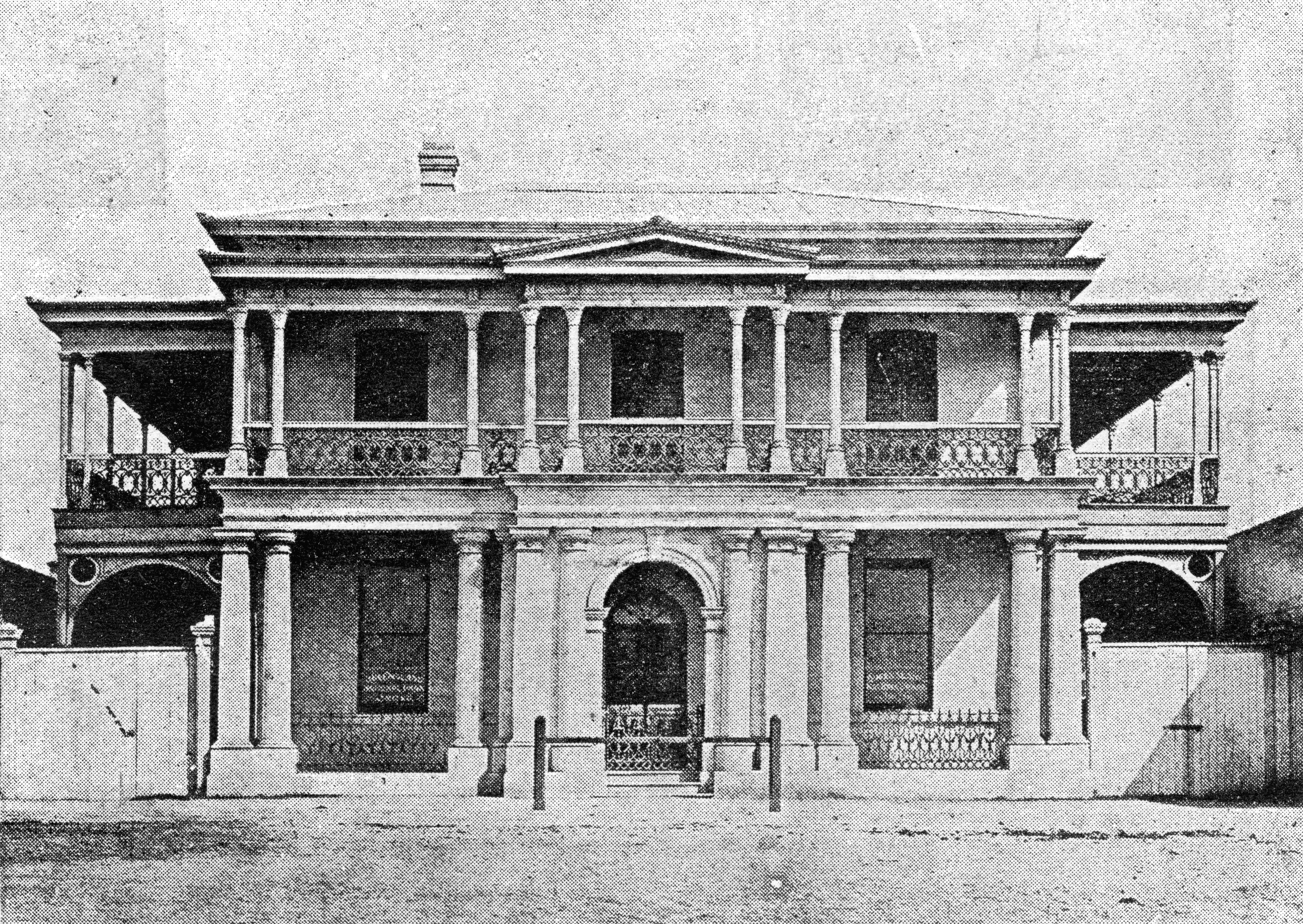
Queensland National Bank, Townsville, 1890s

The new offices were designed by then colonial architect Francis Drummond Greville Stanley, who from the late 1870s to the late 1890s designed a substantial number of bank buildings in Queensland for the QNB, the Australian Joint Stock Bank, and the Union Bank. The contractor was Townsville builder CA Ward. Total cost of the new premises, including land, was just over £6,000. At the time, it was the most substantial building in Townsville. The ground floor offices comprised a large banking chamber, manager's room, strong room, and stationery store. The manager's accommodation on the first floor consisted of a large drawing room, bedrooms and a bathroom. The dining room was located on the ground floor at the rear, with easy access to the kitchen. Verandahs to both levels at the front and sides, demonstrating what appears to be the first use of elaborately decorative cast-iron balustrading in North Queensland, were an important adaptation to the climate.

The building functioned as banking premises for one hundred and three years, first as the QNB, and from 1948 as the National Bank of Australasia Limited, following the merger of the QNB with the NBA in that year. The NBA closed the branch in April 1982, and sold the property in 1983.

In 1984 the building was refurbished and re-opened as commercial offices. The principal lessee in the 1980s was the Queensland Tourist Travel Corporation.

In 2016, the former bank is used as an antiques and vintage shop.

== Description ==
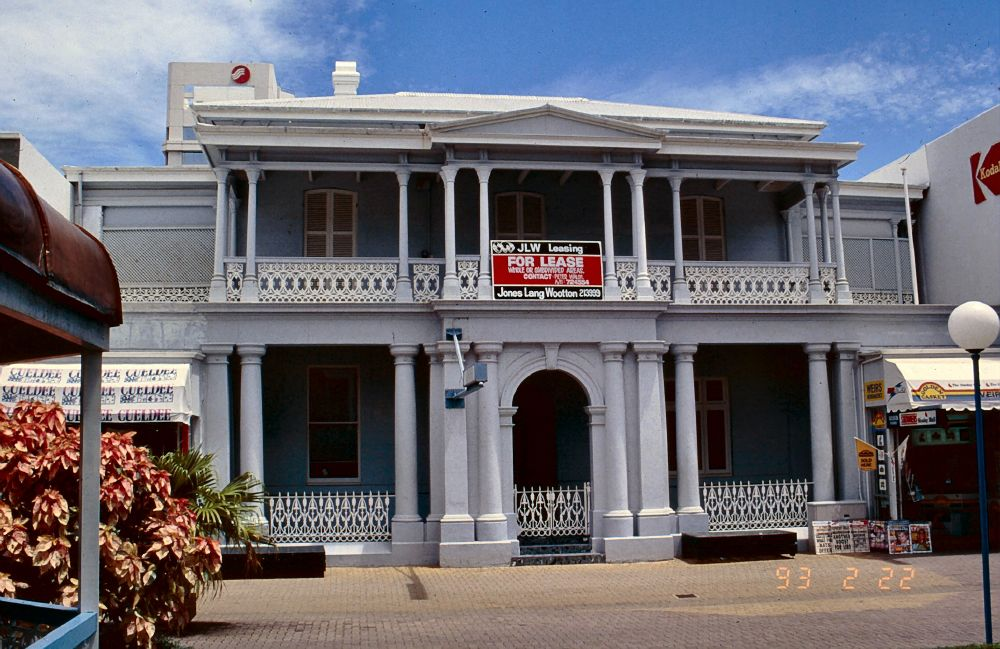
Queensland National Bank, 1993

The former Queensland National Bank, located on the northern side of Flinders Street Mall, is a two-storeyed rendered masonry building with a hipped corrugated iron roof and classical revival facade. The building is built to the site's front and side boundaries, with the side verandahs being enclosed.

The facade, consisting of verandahs to both floors, is divided into three bays. The ground floor features Tuscan Order columns supporting an entablature with cornice, and the first floor features paired Egyptian inspired, Lotus Bud capital, cast iron columns supporting a corrugated iron awning. The arched centre entrance bay projects on both floors, and is surmounted by a gable and both floors have cast iron balustrade, but of a different design. The ground floor has a timber framed glass entrance door with an arched fanlight, with a large sash window on the west and a casement on the east. The first floor has french doors with timber louvred shutters.

Each of the side verandahs have been fitted out as a shop at ground level. The first floor has paired timber posts with the rear being enclosed with glass louvres. The rear of the building has a single- storeyed masonry wing, with a corrugated iron gable roof, which has had recent concrete block additions. The east verandah tenancy has a long single-storeyed concrete block addition with a skillion corrugated iron roof. The rear of the site is concreted and used for car parking.

Internally, the ground floor has a large front office, with a strongroom, some partitioning, false ceilings, floor vents and two steel columns. Windows onto side verandahs have been enclosed. At the rear, a timber stair with turned balustrade leads to the first floor from a rear foyer which has double timber doors with arched fanlight and sidelights. The rear wing has been refitted and extended to house staff amenities.

The first floor contains a kitchen at the rear, large offices opening onto the front and side verandahs, plaster ceilings, painted timber joinery and panelled doors with fanlights.

== Heritage listing ==
The former Queensland National Bank was listed on the Queensland Heritage Register on 28 January 1994 having satisfied the following criteria.

The place is important in demonstrating the evolution or pattern of Queensland's history.

Its location demonstrates the development of Townsville as a port for the Ravenswood and Charters Towers goldfields and as the principal town in North Queensland at that time.

The place demonstrates rare, uncommon or endangered aspects of Queensland's cultural heritage.

The place is important in demonstrating the principal characteristics of a particular class of cultural places.

The former Queensland National Bank, erected in 1878–1879, is a characteristic 1870s regional bank building adapted to a tropical climate, and is one of the few remaining 1870s buildings in Townsville.

The place is important because of its aesthetic significance.

The quality of design and composition of classical elements are of considerable aesthetic value, and it is a fine example of the work of Queensland colonial architect FDG Stanley.

The place has a special association with the life or work of a particular person, group or organisation of importance in Queensland's history.

The building is part of the Queensland National Bank's contribution to the development of North Queensland in the last quarter of the 19th century. The quality of design and composition of classical elements are of considerable aesthetic value, and it is a fine example of the work of Queensland colonial architect FDG Stanley.
