= Federal Hotel, Fremantle =

Building in Fremantle, Western Australia

Federal Hotel
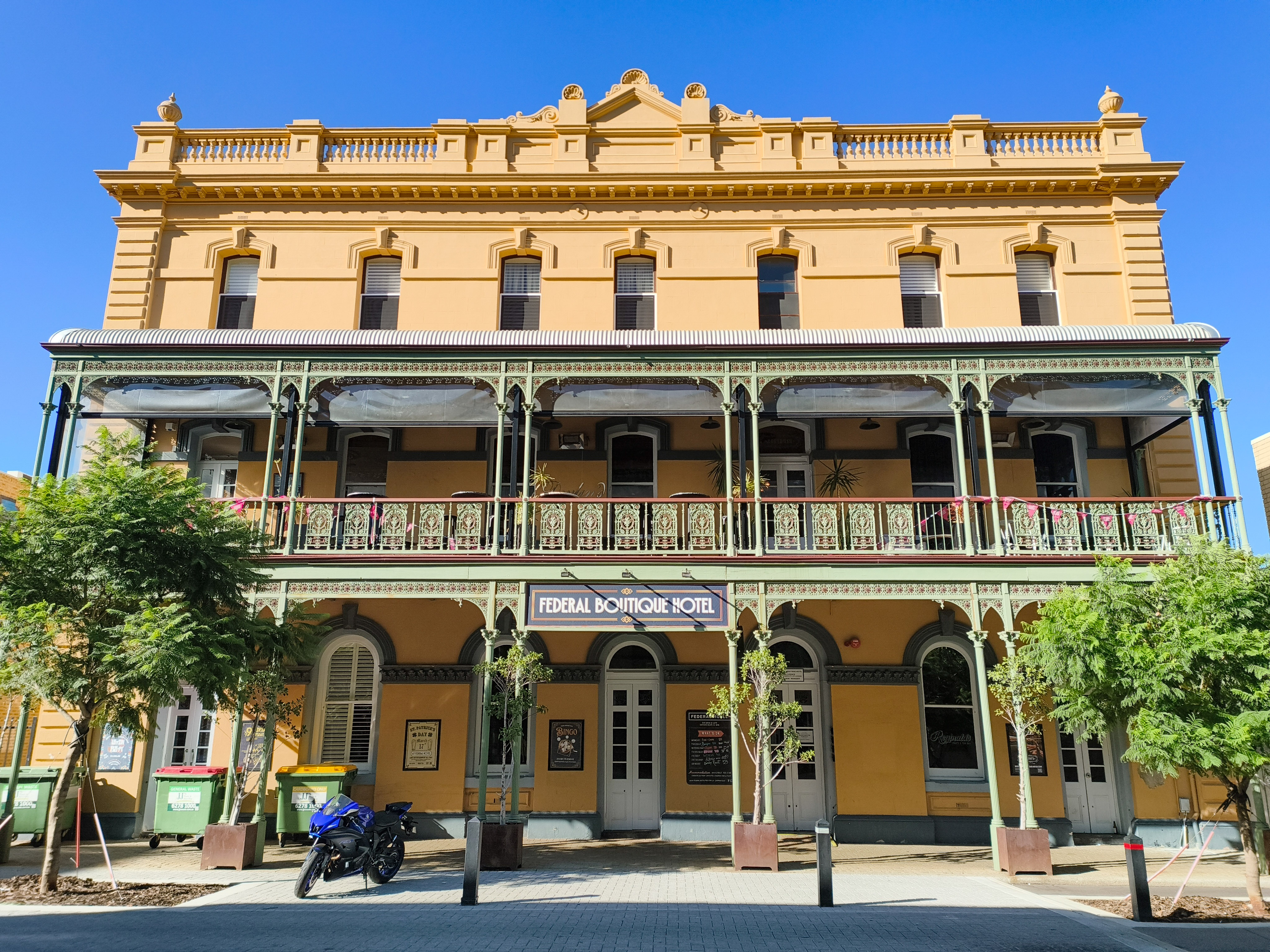
- Alternative names: Rosie O'Grady's

General information
- Architectural style: Victorian Free Classical
- Location: 23–25 William Street, Fremantle
- Coordinates: 32.0548°S 115.7479°E
- Opened: July 1887
- Renovated: 1904, 1995, 2016
- Client: James Herbert Jnr
- Owner: Nikola Jurin

Technical details
- Floor count: 3

Design and construction
- Architect: George Charles Inskip
- Main contractor: Jordine and Ruthven

Renovating team
- Architects: J. H. Eales (1904); Maxwell Cox Architects (1995)

Website
- federalhotelfreo.com.au

The Federal Hotel is located at 23–25 William Street in Fremantle, Western Australia, opposite the Fremantle Town Hall.

== History ==
The three-storey hotel was designed by George Charles Inskip (1840–1931) and built by Jordine and Ruthven for James Herbert Junior (1841–1893). Herbert was the proprietor of the Rockingham Arms and the Freemasons Hotel. Inskip was a Melbourne based architect, who came to Western Australia in 1879 to superintend work on Edmund Blacket's design for St George's Cathedral, Perth. Inskip subsequently was commissioned to design a new Union Bank in Albany in 1884. Inskip also designed the Union Bank buildings in Perth, Fremantle, Roebourne and Geraldton. At the time it was built, the Federal was described in the press as being "equal to the best in the sister colonies and far in advance of anything so far erected in Western Australia".

In August 1888 Herbert filed for bankruptcy and the receivers subsequently arranged for the property to be transferred to Alexander Forrest and John Forrest. In 1904, local architect, Joseph Herbert Eales (1864–1957) was responsible for extensive additions to the Federal Hotel, including the front verandahs and the western wing, which extends towards the rear of the premises.

On 8 February 1927 the hotel was the scene of a double murder, when Lillian Josephine Martin and her four-year-old son Daniel Charles were found dead in an upstairs bedroom of the building. Martin, her son and Jack Thomas had booked into the hotel under the name of Mr and Mrs Martin on 7 February. Thomas left the hotel at 7:30 am the following day and the bodies of Martin and her son were discovered at 11:00 am by a house maid. Martin had been strangled and her son's throat had been cut. An extensive search was then undertaken by the police for Thomas, whose body was later found near the Mends Street Jetty in South Perth on 13 February. The coroner subsequently concluded that Thomas had committed both murders and then committed suicide by shooting himself with a revolver.

In 1989 the hotel was renamed to Rosie O'Grady's, an Irish themed pub. In 1995 the building underwent internal alterations, reconstruction of the two-storey front verandah and repainting of the front façade, with the works being carried out by Maxwell Cox Architects. Further internal changes were made in 2001.

In January 2016 Rosie O'Grady's closed for business and the hotel was re-opened as the Federal Hotel.

== Heritage listings ==
On 21 October 1980 the building was included on the Register of the National Estate and 1 August 1983 it was classified by the National Trust of Australia (WA).

The City of Fremantle included it on their Municipal Inventory on 18 September 2000 and on their Heritage List on 8 March 2007.
