= Australian Joint Stock Bank Building, Townsville =

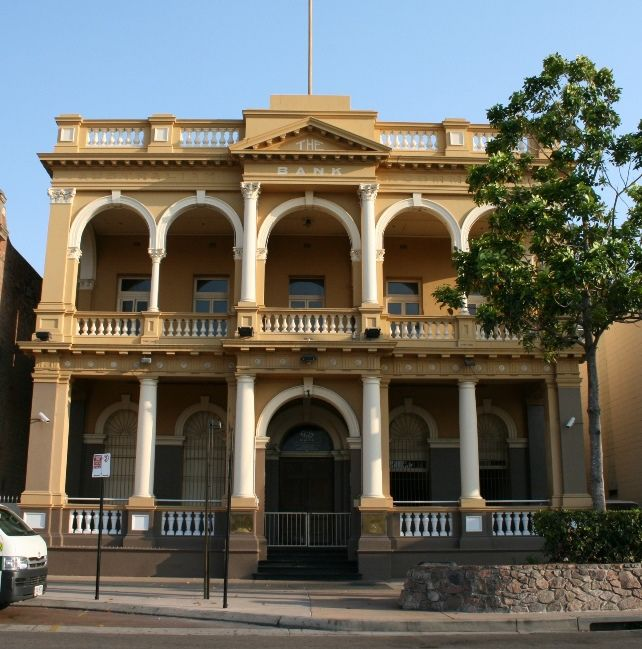
- Former Australian Joint Stock Bank, Townsville, 2011

- Location within Queensland Location within Australia
- 19.2572°S 146.8199°E
- Location: 173 Flinders Street, Townsville CBD, City of Townsville, Queensland, Australia

History
- Design period: 1870s–1890s (late 19th century)
- Built: 1887–1888
- Built for: Australian Joint Stock Bank

Site notes
- Architect: Francis Drummond Greville Stanley
- Architectural style: Classicism

Queensland Heritage Register
- Official name: Australian Joint Stock Bank (former), Australian Bank of Commerce, The Bank Nite Club
- Type: state heritage (built)
- Designated: 21 October 1992
- Reference no.: 600895
- Significant period: 1880s, 1890s (fabric); 1888–1931 (historical use as bank)
- Significant components: residential accommodation – manager's house/quarters, loggia/s
- Builders: MacMahon & Cliffe

Australian Joint Stock Bank Building is a heritage-listed bank at 173 Flinders Street, Townsville CBD, City of Townsville, Queensland, Australia. It was designed by Francis Drummond Greville Stanley and built from 1887 to 1888 by MacMahon & Cliffe. It is also known as Australian Bank of Commerce and The Bank Nite Club. It was added to the Queensland Heritage Register on 21 October 1992.

== History ==
This two-storeyed rendered brick building was erected in 1887–88 as the Townsville branch of the Sydney-based Australian Joint Stock Bank, on land acquired by the bank in 1881.

The AJS Bank was the first financial institution to establish an office in Townsville, in March 1866, in a small timber building on the Strand. In 1875, the bank erected more substantial offices, but these were replaced with the present building in 1887–88. Its construction, at a cost of approximately £7,000, reflected the business and building boom which accompanied Townsville's growth as the port for the Ravenswood and Charters Towers goldfields, and for the North Queensland sugar and pastoral industries.

The new building was designed by former Queensland Colonial Architect Francis Drummond Greville Stanley of Brisbane. Stanley designed a substantial number of North Queensland buildings for the AJS, Union and Queensland National banks in the 1880s and 1890s, and as colonial architect from 1873 to 1881 was responsible for Townsville's more imposing public buildings, including the 1877 Magistrates Court, the first hospital (1870s), the 1878 jail, and the 1879 telegraph office.

Stanley called for tenders for the AJS Bank building in December 1886, and the contract was let to Townsville contractors MacMahon and Cliffe. Elements of both the design and the construction were considered innovative. The colonnaded front elevation was a new concept in Townsville architecture, accommodating to a tropical climate, and rolled wrought-iron beams were utilised in the construction, rather than the cast-iron girders used extensively in Townsville buildings at that period. The floor of the balcony was constructed of cork concrete, a lighter product than the more usual blue metal mix.

On the ground floor, the entrance doors opened into a large vestibule, from which a manager's room opened off to the right, and a stationery store to the left. Beyond the vestibule was the banking chamber, a large room 12.2 by 11.6 metres (40 by 38 ft), with 6 metres (20 ft) high walls and a lantern light, or clerestory, with arched sashes and small engaged columns, reaching nearly 10 metres (33 ft) above the floor of the chamber. Cedar screens divided the main chamber from the bill department and the accountant's office on one side, and the ledger clerks on the other. At the rear of the banking chamber were an ante room for the clerks and a strong room, separated by a wide hall. The first floor comprised residential accommodation, consisting of sitting rooms, bedrooms and bathroom. It was accessed via a hall and stair off the ground floor vestibule. Alterations to the residential accommodation were made in 1898. They were designed by Townsville architect Walter Morris Eyre, who had been employed by Stanley in the early 1880s.

The building remained as banking premises for over forty years - from 1910 as a branch of the Australian Bank of Commerce Ltd, another Sydney-based bank, which took over AJS Bank in that year. In 1931 the ABC in turn was absorbed by the Bank of New South Wales Ltd, which first rented out and then sold the building in 1938. Since 1931 the former bank has functioned as general offices and, more recently, as a night club.

== Description ==
The Bank building, located on the northern side of Flinders Street at the base of Melton Hill, is a two-storey rendered masonry building with a hipped corrugated iron roof concealed behind a symmetrical classical facade. The building is set back from the site's side boundaries with a service lane on the eastern side and a walkway on the western.

The facade, consisting of loggias to both floors, is divided into five bays. The ground floor has Tuscan Order columns and pilasters supporting an entablature with a deep cornice, and the first floor has Corinthian columns and pilasters surmounted by arches with entablature, deep cornice and balustrade above, all of which return the depth of the loggia. The centre entrance bay projects on both floors, and is surmounted by a pediment. The words AUSTRALIAN BANK OF COMMERCE LTD can be seen in relief along the first floor frieze. The ground floor has double timber central entrance doors, with arched sash windows to either side which have been painted out and covered with steel grilles. The first floor has five sets of French doors with fanlights and both floors have rendered balustrades.

The first floor residence is accessed via the western side walkway to an internal staircase with turned timber balustrade. The first floor, consisting of rooms along the loggia with a passage behind, has sash windows to the rear with a bathroom at the western end. A kitchenette has been added above the staircase and is accessed from the loggia.

The ground floor is accessed via a central foyer with painted double timber doors, with etched glass panels and sidelights with a timber pedimented surround, which leads into the nightclub space. This space has a much higher coffered plaster ceiling, the central section of which is raised and blacked-out with a lighting grid below. Above this is a clerestory, possibly with a domed vault. A western side verandah has been enclosed for a seating area and the rear of the building has single-storeyed concrete block staff amenities.

The ground floor interior, with a lurid colour scheme, has a sunken centre dancefloor. A disc jockey booth has been added to the eastern side, toilets inserted to the west of the foyer and a bar to the east.

== Heritage listing ==
The former Australian Joint Stock Bank Building was listed on the Queensland Heritage Register on 21 October 1992 having satisfied the following criteria.

The place is important in demonstrating the evolution or pattern of Queensland's history.

The Australian Joint Stock Bank Building, erected in 1887–88 as a branch of the Australian Joint Stock Bank, is important in demonstrating the pattern of development and evolution of Townsville as the principal town and port of North Queensland in the late 19th century, and is a reflection of the building boom which transformed the town's central business district in the 1880s and 1890s.

The place is important in demonstrating the principal characteristics of a particular class of cultural places.

It is important in demonstrating the principal characteristics of a regional masonry bank building of the Queensland boom era, and of the commercial work of former Queensland colonial architect FDG Stanley.

The place is important because of its aesthetic significance.

It is important in exhibiting a range of aesthetic characteristics valued by the Townsville community, in particular its quality of design and composition of classical elements; its contribution to the streetscape of Flinders Street and to the Townsville townscape; and the quality of its surviving, original internal elements.

The place is important in demonstrating a high degree of creative or technical achievement at a particular period.

It is important in demonstrating creative and technical achievement in an innovative use of design and materials, in particular illustrating important design adaptations to the tropical Townsville climate.

The place has a special association with the life or work of a particular person, group or organisation of importance in Queensland's history.

It has a special association with the Australian Joint Stock Bank and its contribution to the development of Townsville and North Queensland in the latter half of the 19th century, and with former colonial architect FDG Stanley and his contribution to North Queensland architecture in the late 19th century.
