= Old Cooktown Hospital =

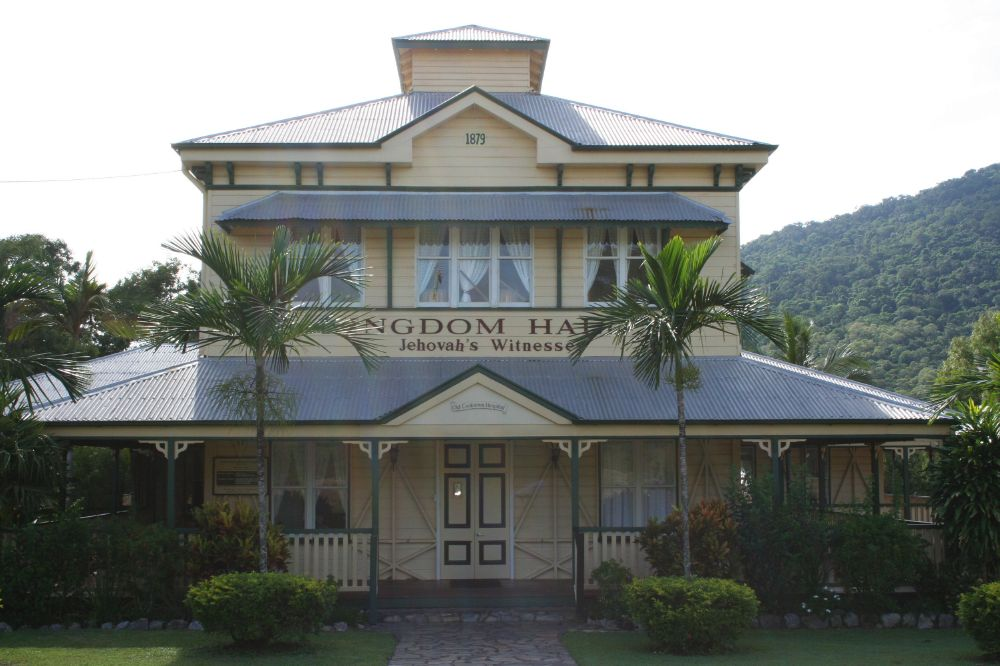
- Old Cooktown Hospital, now Jehovah's Witness Kingdom Hall, 2010

- Location within Queensland Location within Australia
- 15.48°S 145.2517°E
- Location: May Street, Cooktown, Shire of Cook, Queensland, Australia

History
- Design period: 1870s–1890s (late 19th century)
- Built: 1879–c. 1881

Site notes
- Architect: Francis Drummond Greville Stanley

Queensland Heritage Register
- Official name: Cooktown Hospital (former), Cooktown Hospital, Jehovah's Witness Kingdom Hall
- Type: state heritage (built)
- Designated: 21 October 1992
- Reference no.: 600424
- Significant period: 1879–1881 (fabric); 1870s–1980s (historical)
- Builders: Alfred Doorey & Son

Old Cooktown Hospital is a heritage-listed former public hospital and now Jehovah's Witness Kingdom Hall at May Street, Cooktown, Shire of Cook, Queensland, Australia. It was designed by Francis Drummond Greville Stanley and built from 1879 to c. 1881 by Alfred Doorey & Son. It was added to the Queensland Heritage Register on 21 October 1992.

== History ==
The former Cooktown Hospital was erected in 1879–81 to the design of Queensland colonial architect FDG Stanley, replacing an earlier temporary hospital building erected in 1874.

Cooktown was established in October 1873 as the Endeavour River port, supply and administrative centre for the Palmer River goldfields. In the earliest days of Cooktown settlement (the summer of 1873–74), new arrivals to the Endeavour River district faced food shortages, floods and fever, and the establishment of a hospital at Cooktown became urgent. In March 1874 a committee was formed to raise local subscriptions for a temporary hospital building, and the first Cook District Hospital, a small timber structure situated on the ridge above Charlotte Street (between Banks and Green Streets), was erected in April 1874. In the same month a Government Medical Officer was appointed, and the colonial government promised £300 for a permanent hospital, if public subscription of an equal amount was raised.

Cook District Hospital serviced the whole of the Endeavour, Palmer, Daintree and Mossman rivers districts, and the small building soon proved inadequate. In 1878 the Queensland colonial government acceded to local pressure and voted £2,000 for the construction of a permanent hospital at Cooktown. In April 1879 colonial architect Stanley was instructed to prepare plans.

Stanley's original plan was for a hardwood building comprising on the ground floor: 3 large wards (central, accident and female), a day room, dispensary and ophthalmic room. Bathrooms were located at each end of the rear verandah, and earth closets in the backyard were connected by walkways to this rear verandah. The middle section of this long, hipped-roofed building had an upper floor, which comprised one large, light, airy ward. While the original plan does not show any proposed extensions, the fact that "central" ward was located at the eastern end of the main building may suggest that Stanley intended an eastern extension. On the original plan there is a rear service wing, at right angles to the main building, comprising warders' quarters, store, laundry, kitchen and wash house. This appears to have been built as intended, but at a later period, was re-positioned parallel to the rear of the main building.

Stanley's design for the Cooktown Hospital, like almost all hospitals erected in Queensland from the 1860s to the 1930s, was based on the principles of the pavilion plan, which emphasised the importance of good ventilation and sanitation. This reflected current "miasmatic theory" accepted by the medical profession: that disease was transmitted by breathing air contaminated with noxious vapours from decomposing organic matter. The Cooktown Hospital was sited on the crest of the ridge above the main street of Cooktown, contained large, airy wards with access to wide surrounding verandahs on the lower level, and the lighting and ventilation of the upper level ward was augmented by a clerestory.

Tenders were called in June 1879 and that of South Brisbane builders Alfred Doorey & Son, with a price of £1945, was accepted in August. In September Stanley travelled to Cooktown and fixed the site for the hospital on the 11.5 acres (4.7 ha) Hospital Reserve (R.91) surveyed in July 1879 by CA Starcke and gazetted in 1880. The site occupied an entire town block - bounded by Hope, Boundary, May and Ida Streets - its size illustrative of the colonial government's commitment to Cooktown's development at this period. Stanley placed the hospital mid-way along Hope St on the western side of the reserve, but orientated the building to face north.

The hospital appears to have been erected under 2 contracts, one let to Doorey & Son in 1879, and a second contract, to erect kitchen and outbuildings, advertised in September 1880 and let to Cooktown builders Gordon and Menzies in November. It has not been determined in which year the additional ward at the eastern end of the building was erected. Oral history records that at some later date, additional accommodation was provided for "aliens" and Aborigines in blocks to the south of the services wing, and connected to this by covered walkways. At some period in the 20th century, the area between the re-positioned kitchen wing and the main building was enclosed as a staff dining room. Over the approximately 105 years that this building functioned as a hospital, a number of internal alterations were made to accommodate changes in medical, surgical and nursing practice.

The Cooktown Hospital survived the cyclones of 1907 and 1949, and during the Second World War functioned as an Air Force hospital.

In the mid-1980s a new hospital was erected in the grounds, and in 1986 the original building was acquired by the local congregation of the Jehovah's Witness, and moved to its present location in May Street, where it now faces west. The building was re-configured when removed to the second site, and the service wing does not appear to have survived. However, the place is still considered symbolic of Cooktown's goldrush days, and is a tourist attraction.

== Description ==
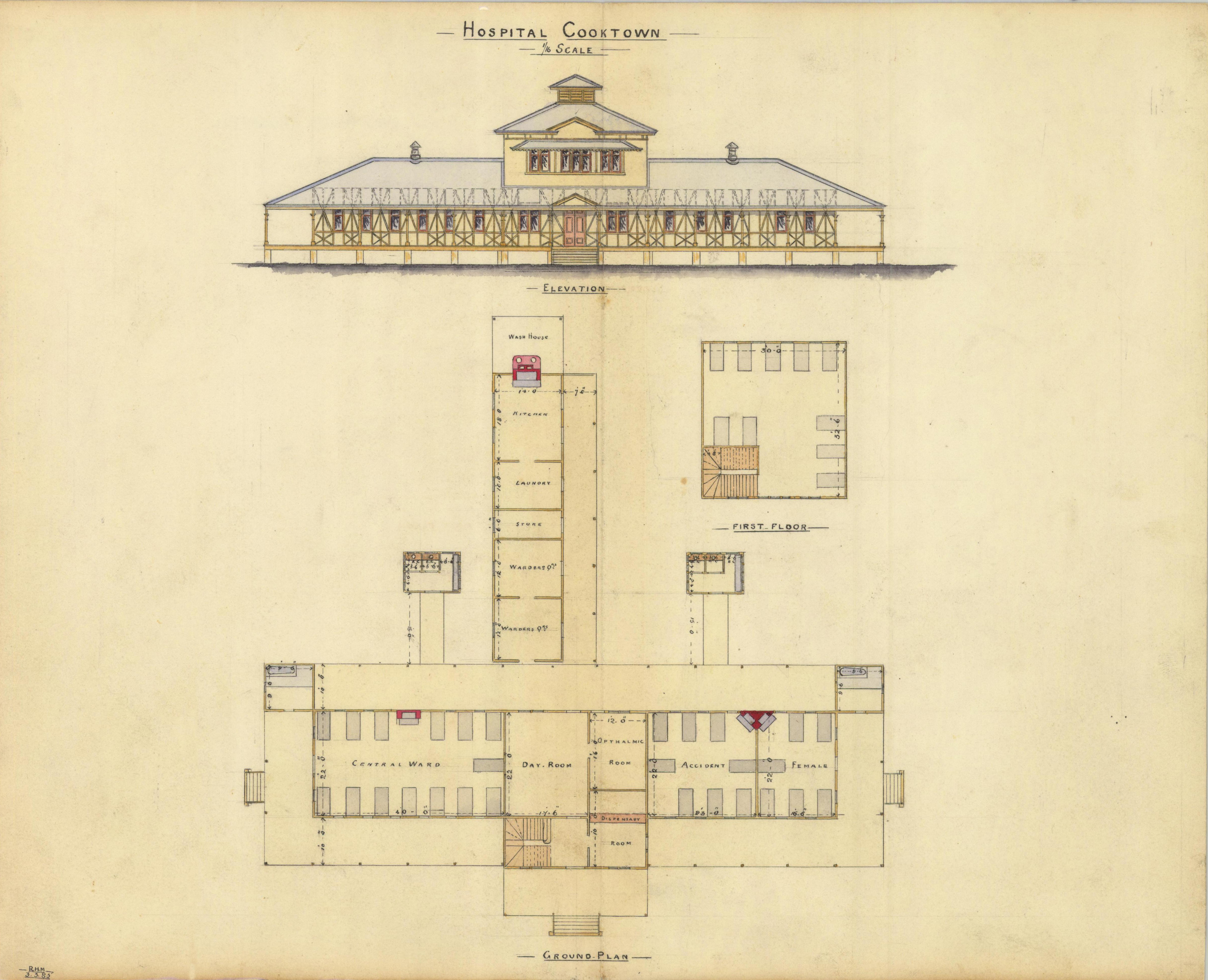
Architectural drawing of the hospital, 3 March 1885

The former Cooktown Hospital is constructed in timber. It has a two-storeyed front section facing west to May Street and a long single-storeyed wing attached at the rear and supported on steel stumps. The relationships of the front and rear sections are not original.

The ground floor level is surrounded by a wide verandah retaining parts of the original structure. It is supported on evenly spaced timber posts which have timber brackets and a simple later battened balustrade. The ground floor has an exposed timber frame with single double-hung windows and French doors in regular positions along each elevation.

The upper storey is clad in rusticated weatherboard (chamferboards). The western elevation has a triple set of double-hung windows with pairs of double-hung windows each side. This bank of windows has a continuous hood which has a decorated fascia and is supported on timber brackets. There are single-hooded double-hung windows on the northern and southern sides. The roof, which is clad in corrugated iron, is a pyramid form with a glazed lantern at the top with the soffits supported on paired timber brackets. Small gabled roofs are positioned centrally at the verandah and the second-storey roof, accentuating the entrance to the building.

Internally at ground floor level the original tongue and groove wall boarding has been covered with plasterboard. Ceilings at this level have been clad in plasterboard in the front section and the original exposed timber truss and tongue and groove boarded ceilings remain in the rear section. The original staircase to the first floor has been retained and the ceiling at this level is an exposed truss system with timber tongue and groove boarding.

== Heritage listing ==
The Old Cooktown Hospital was listed on the Queensland Heritage Register on 21 October 1992 having satisfied the following criteria.

The place is important in demonstrating the evolution or pattern of Queensland's history.

The former Cooktown Hospital, erected 1879–81, is important to Queensland history, being illustrative of the 1870s establishment of Cooktown as the principal port, supply and administrative centre to the important Palmer River goldfields.

The place demonstrates rare, uncommon or endangered aspects of Queensland's cultural heritage.

It is rare as one of Queensland's few surviving 19th century hospital buildings, and even rarer as an 1870s hospital building, based on pavilion plan design, addressing a tropical climate.

The place is important in demonstrating the principal characteristics of a particular class of cultural places.

Although re-located within Cooktown and re-configured, the building retains much early fabric and in the two-storeyed section, illustrates late 19th century concerns with adequate ventilation and light in hospital design for a tropical climate.

The place is important because of its aesthetic significance.

The building, re-sited with Mount Cook as a backdrop, retains its late 19th century aesthetic appeal.

The place has a strong or special association with a particular community or cultural group for social, cultural or spiritual reasons.

The place has an important association for the local community, which regards the building as still strongly associated with Cooktown's late 19th century boom, and which promotes the building as a tourist attraction.
