= Federal Hotel =

Federal Hotel may refer to:

- Federal Group, an Australian Hotel chain (also known as Federal Hotels, or Federal Hotels and Resorts)
- Federal Hotel, Childers, Queensland, Australia
- Federal Coffee Palace, a former hotel in Melbourne, Australia
- Federal Hotel, Fremantle, Western Australia
- Federal Hotel, Kalgoorlie, Western Australia
- The Federal Kuala Lumpur, Malaysia
- Federal Palace Hotel, Victoria Island, Lagos, Nigeria
