= Townsville Magistrates Court =

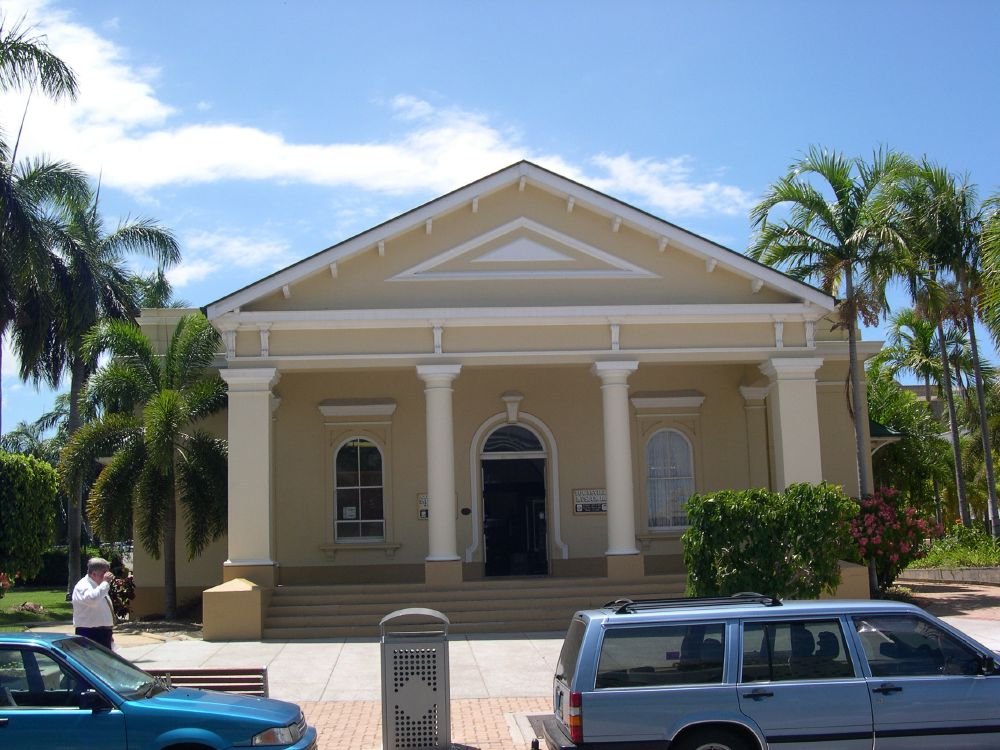
- Townsville Magistrates Court, 2003

- Location within Queensland Location within Australia
- 19.2583°S 146.8157°E
- Location: 81 Sturt Street, Townsville CBD, City of Townsville, Queensland, Australia

History
- Design period: 1870s–1890s (late 19th century)
- Built: 1874–1901

Site notes
- Architect: Francis Drummond Greville Stanley
- Architectural style: Classicism

Queensland Heritage Register
- Official name: Townsville Magistrates Court (former), Townsville Court House, Townsville Museum
- Type: state heritage (built)
- Designated: 21 October 1992
- Reference no.: 600929
- Significant period: 1870s–1880s (historical); 1874–1910s (fabric); 1874–ongoing (social)
- Significant components: court house
- Builders: J & J Rooney

Townsville Magistrates Court is a heritage-listed former courthouse and now theatre at 81 Sturt Street, Townsville CBD, City of Townsville, Queensland, Australia. It was designed by Francis Drummond Greville Stanley and built from 1874 to 1876 by J & J Rooney. It is also known as Townsville Court House and Townsville Museum. It was added to the Queensland Heritage Register on 21 October 1992.

== History ==
This single-storeyed brick building was constructed in 1874–76 as the second Townsville Magistrates Court. It was designed by colonial architect FDG Stanley, and was constructed by Townsville builders J & J Rooney, at a cost £4,463.

The Magistrates Court was the second brick building erected in Townsville, and took two years to complete due to a shortage of suitable brick clay.

The Townsville Magistrates Court held circuit sittings of the Northern Division of the Supreme Court (twice a year), as well as sittings of the Northern District Court (twice a year), the Police Court (daily), and the Petty Debts Court (twice a week) - the latter two presided over by the Police Magistrate. A lockup and quarters for the lockup keeper were associated with the Court House.

The court house was repaired and painted in April 1895 and a verandah on the western side was added in 1897. In 1901 James Brady constructed a strong room on the rear western side.

The building functioned as a court house for almost 100 years. With the construction of new court facilities in Walker Street, the old structure was threatened with demolition. Community agitation saved the building and it was purchased by the Townsville City Council in the early 1970s.

After restoration it was used as a day care facility, then as a tourist information centre and in 1985 it became the Townsville Museum. The building was vacated in November 2003.

In 2016, the building is used by the Full Throttle Theatre Company.

== Description ==
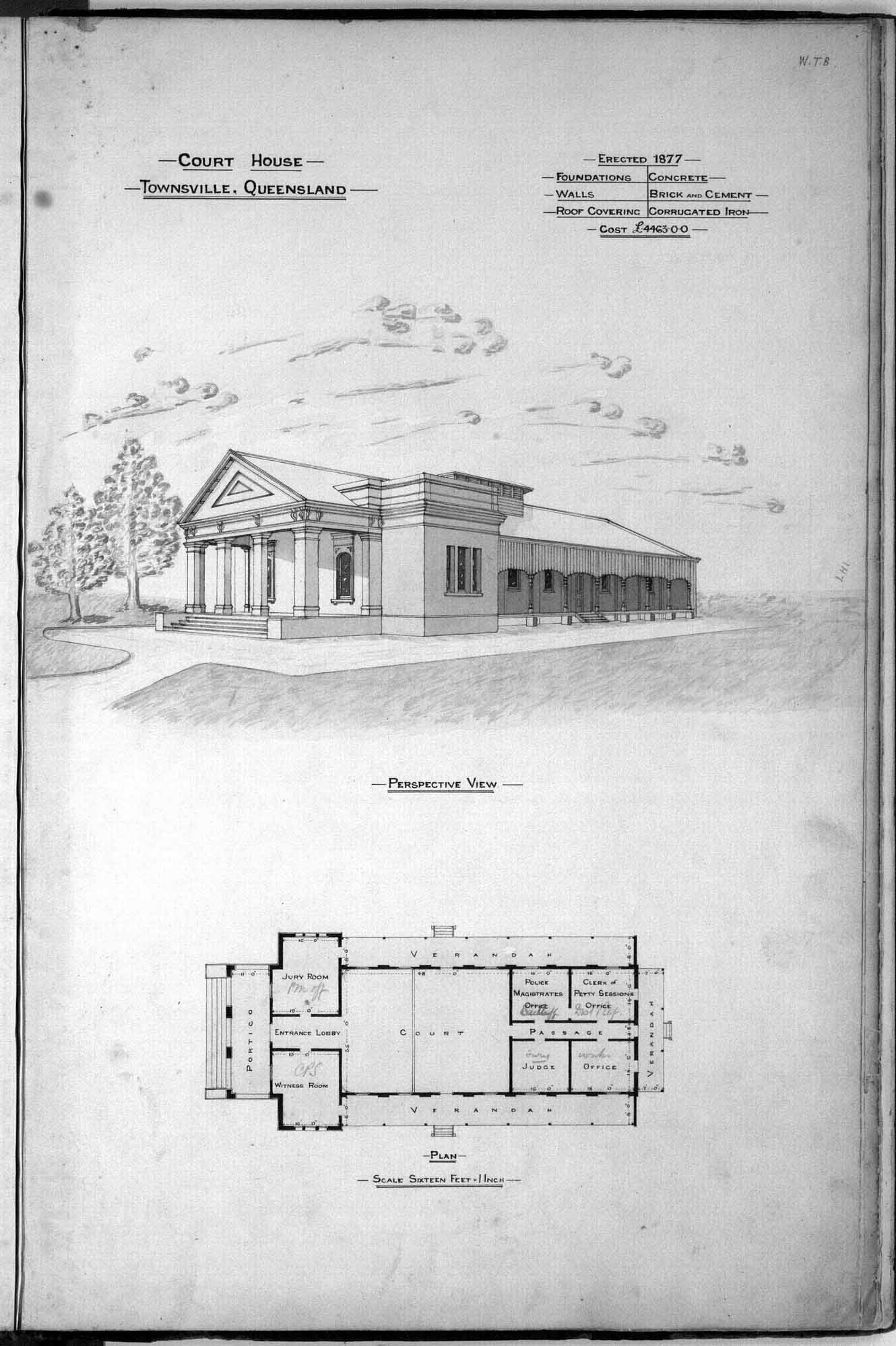
Architectural plan, 1888

This single-storeyed building was constructed in two distinct parts. The front section was made of rendered brick and the rear of timber.

The Sturt Street frontage, which originally housed the magistrate's office, is a symmetrically designed structure. The classical portico, which is reached by a short flight of stairs, features a gabled pediment, columns and round arched door and windows. The restrained nature of this section gives the impression of strength and permanence.

The timber rear of the building, with its wide verandahs and timber valance, is more in keeping with the tropical environment.

A section across the back of the structure has been enclosed with glass louvres, while the 1901 strong room remains intact.

The building has a hipped roof of corrugated iron and a skillion roof covers the original strongroom at the rear.

A modern garden of lawn and shade trees enhances the building.

This structure retains its early facade despite interior alterations.

== Heritage listing ==
The former Townsville Magistrates Court was listed on the Queensland Heritage Register on 21 October 1992 having satisfied the following criteria.

The place is important in demonstrating the evolution or pattern of Queensland's history.

The Magistrates Court, completed in 1876, is significant historically as evidence of the early consolidation of Townsville as a government administrative centre in northern Queensland, and in illustrating the early use of brick in Townsville.

The place is important in demonstrating the principal characteristics of a particular class of cultural places.

It illustrates some of the principal characteristics of its type, with the imposing classical design exemplifying the building's important judicial and authoritative role.

The place is important because of its aesthetic significance.

The Magistrates Court is an aesthetically pleasing 19th century building which sits well in a modern townscape, as well as contributing significantly to Townsville's surviving historical townscape.

The place has a strong or special association with a particular community or cultural group for social, cultural or spiritual reasons.

The place is valued by the local community as an important part of their cultural heritage, as evidenced by the 1970s purchase of the property by the Townsville City Council.

The place has a special association with the life or work of a particular person, group or organisation of importance in Queensland's history.

It is significant as an example of the work of colonial architect FDG Stanley, and of the early work of the Townsville-based North Queensland building firm, J & J Rooney.
