= Australian Joint Stock Bank Building, Maryborough =

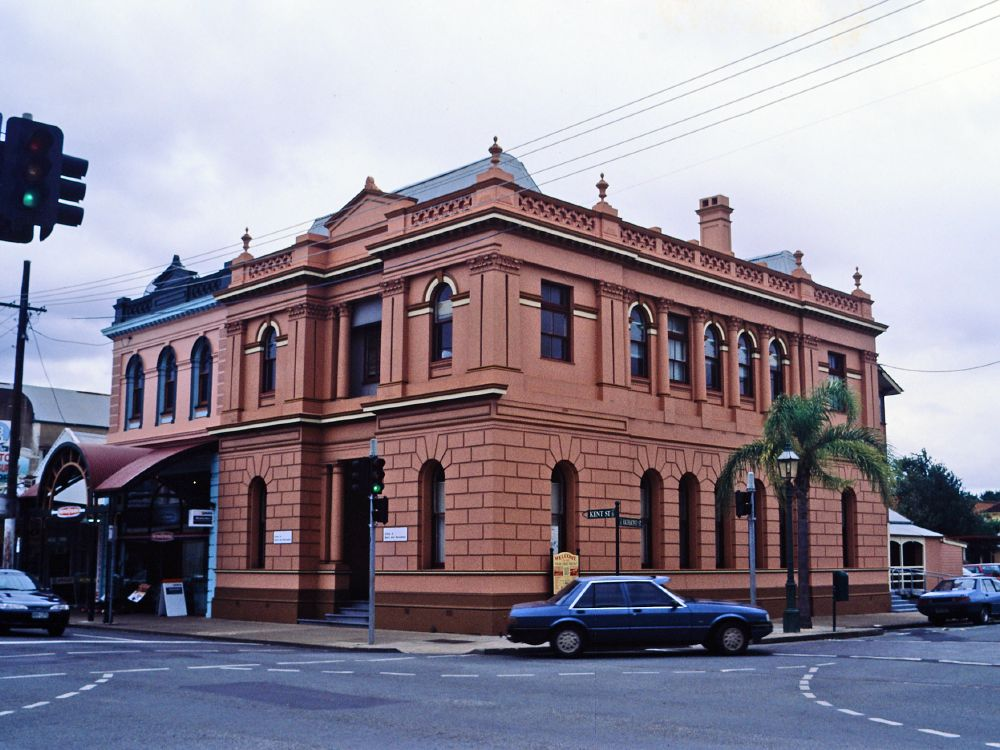
- Australian Joint Stock Bank Building, 1997

- Location within Queensland Location within Australia
- 25.5389°S 152.7044°E
- Location: 331 Kent Street, Maryborough, Fraser Coast Region, Queensland, Australia

History
- Design period: 1870s–1890s (late 19th century)
- Built: 1882

Site notes
- Architect: Francis Drummond Greville Stanley
- Architectural style: Classicism

Queensland Heritage Register
- Official name: Australian Joint Stock Bank (former), Department of Primary Industries Building, Union Bank, Office of Sport and Recreation
- Type: state heritage (built)
- Designated: 21 October 1992
- Reference no.: 600693
- Significant period: 1880s (fabric); 1882–1952 (historical use as bank); 1955–c.2008 (government use)
- Significant components: residential accommodation – staff quarters, banking chamber, strong room
- Builders: French & Crystall

Australian Joint Stock Bank Building is a heritage-listed former bank and now museum at 331 Kent Street, Maryborough, Fraser Coast Region, Queensland, Australia. It was designed by Francis Drummond Greville Stanley and built in 1882 by French & Crystall. It was also known as the Department of Primary Industries Building, the Union Bank building, and the Office of Sport and Recreation. It was added to the Queensland Heritage Register on 21 October 1992.

It is now a museum focusing on the works of P. L. Travers, called The Story Bank.

== History ==
This bank building was constructed in Maryborough in 1882 as the third branch of the Australian Joint Stock Bank to the design of prominent Queensland architect, Francis Drummond Grenville (FDG) Stanley.

Settlement at Maryborough commenced in September 1847 when George Furber established a woolstore on the south bank of the Mary River at the head of navigation. He was followed in June 1848 by ET Aldridge and Henry and RE Palmer, who established their own wharves on the opposite riverbank, at a location now known as the original Maryborough town site at Baddow.

In 1850 a new town site was surveyed to the east, at a downstream position which provided better access for shipping. The first sale of land at this new site occurred in 1852, but most residents did not shift to the current centre of Maryborough until 1855 and 1856. Maryborough was gazetted a Port of Entry in 1859 and was proclaimed a municipality in 1861. During the 1860s and 1870s it flourished as the principal port for the nearby Gympie goldfield and as an outlet for timber and sugar. The establishment of manufacturing plants and primary industries sustained growth in the town into the twentieth century.

During the 1860s and 1870s, many banking institutes established purpose-built premises from where they conducted business. One of the first banks established in this town was the Australian Joint Stock Bank which opened a branch at the corner of Kent and Richmond streets in 1864.

Floods in the 1870s destroyed the first Australian Joint Stock Bank and the building was rebuilt. By 1880 this rebuilt structure was considered uninhabitable and steps were made toward construction of yet another building.

FDG Stanley was the architect for the new building and he is known to have designed branches of the Australian Joint Stock Bank in Gympie, Mackay, Ravenswood and Townsville, as well as additions to the Rockhampton branch. The contractors for the project, local builders, French and Crystall, submitted a tender for £5378 which was accepted and it is thought the construction commenced in mid 1882. In August 1882 reports of the progress of building works appeared in the Maryborough Chronicle: "the AJS Bank premises are currently being pulled down to make way for a larger and finer edifice more in keeping with its rivals, a hint which might be taken by the owners of other somewhat insignificant buildings".

A fine two-storeyed masonry bank was constructed with strong classical influences conveying the values of tradition and strength historically identified with this style of architecture. As part of the project a two-storey extension was constructed along Kent Street to house the local branch of popular Queensland department store, Finney Isles and Co. Along Richmond Street there was a one-storey bank manager's residence.

Maryborough was the birthplace of Helen Lyndon Goff who under the name PL Travers authored the well known Mary Poppins series of books. Her father was Travers Robert Goff, the manager of the Australian Joint Stock Bank at the time of her birth on 9 August 1899. A bronze statue at the front of the former bank commemorates Travers and her literary achievements.

The bank continued in this branch until 1901 when it closed. By 1906 the premises had been leased to the Union Bank with a right to purchase the property, which was exercised in 1912. By 1924 a verandah had been constructed to the Richmond Street side of the building, requiring the removal of cornices and string coursing and the lengthening of several window openings to house French doors.

In 1952 the Union Bank merged with the Bank of Australasia to form the Australian and New Zealand (ANZ) Bank, which operated in Maryborough from the Bank of Australasia's existing premises. The former Union Bank was therefore offered for sale again and the Queensland Government purchased the building for $12,000 to house the local regional office of the Department of Primary Industries. Subsequently, the building became the home of the Office of Recreation and Sport, with the Correctional Services Department leasing space on the upper floor.

The current owner, the Fraser Coast Regional Council, purchased the building in 2015.

It is now a museum focusing on the works of P. L. Travers, called The Story Bank.

In 2019 the building's parking lot was converted into a park, called Mary's Garden, which was officially opened by Fraser Coast mayor George Seymour.

== Description ==
The former Australian Joint Stock Bank is a prominent building in Maryborough, located on the corner of Richmond and Kent streets in the central business district of the town. The building comprises a two-storeyed section to Kent Street with a one storeyed wing to the rear, accessed from Richmond Street.

The brick load bearing building has stuccoed facades to Kent and Richmond Streets. Centrally located on the Kent Street facade is the principal entrance bay, comprising a two-storeyed recessed porch, broken at first floor level by a heavy entablature which lines the two principal facades of the building. Framing this recess are two sets of columns, Doric order at the ground floor and Corinthian order on the first floor. The ground floor has a smooth rendered base, above which the body of the walls are rusticated, with centrally located round arched window openings to both floors. The upper floor has paired Corinthian pilasters which frame the face of the sections flanking the entrance bay. Seemingly supported on the pilasters and the attached columns of the central bay on the first floor, is a dentilled entablature surmounted by a decorative parapet, with central triangular pediment flanked by balustraded sections over the side bays. Terminating the parapets are urns at each end. A steeply pitched, corrugated iron clad, mansard roof is partially concealed behind the parapet.

The Richmond Street facade of the building continues the architectural motifs of the Kent Street elevation, although the construction of a later verandah entailed the removal and replacement of some details on this elevation. Abutting the rear of the two-storeyed section of the former Australian Joint Stock Bank is a two-storeyed timber framed verandah, enclosed at the first floor and with deep scalloped frieze to the ground floor level. A single-storeyed section of the building to the rear of the Richmond Street elevation is constructed of painted and bagged brick and has a simple gabled roof and timber-framed verandah.

Internally the building has timber boarded floors and plastered ceilings and walls. Many internal alterations have occurred.

== Heritage listing ==
The former Australian Joint Stock Bank building in Maryborough was listed on the Queensland Heritage Register on 21 October 1992 having satisfied the following criteria.

The place is important in demonstrating the evolution or pattern of Queensland's history.

Built in 1882 as the local branch of the Australian Joint Stock Bank, this building illustrates the growth of Maryborough during the nineteenth century.

The place is important in demonstrating the principal characteristics of a particular class of cultural places.

The building is characteristic of a two-storey masonry bank, designed with a strong influence of classical architecture manifesting authority and strength, traditionally associated with financial institutes.

The place is important because of its aesthetic significance.

The building is well composed and has considerable architectural merit. It is a landmark in Maryborough, contributing to both the Kent and Richmond Street streetscapes. The building is a good example of the commercial work of FDG Stanley and is associated with him.
