= Commonwealth Bank Building, Mackay =

Heritage listed bank building in Queensland

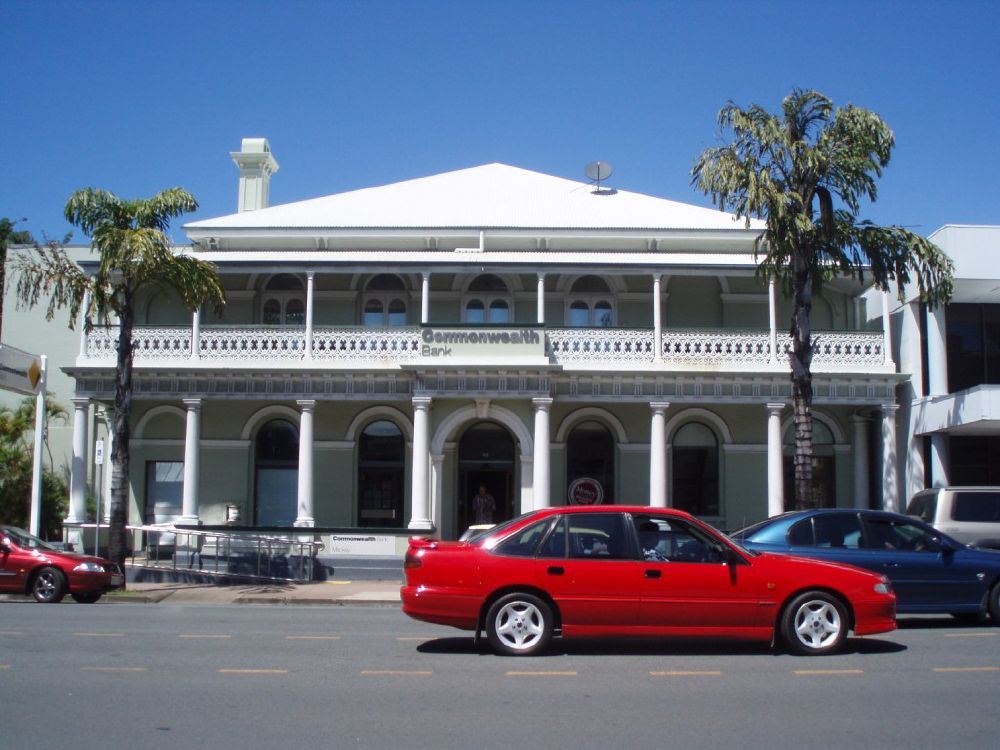
- Commonwealth Bank of Australia, Mackay, 2009

- Location within Queensland Location within Australia
- 21.1417°S 149.1876°E
- Location: 63 Victoria Street, Mackay, Mackay Region, Queensland, Australia

History
- Design period: 1870s–1890s (late 19th century)
- Built: 1880

Site notes
- Architect: Francis Drummond Greville Stanley
- Architectural style: Classicism

Queensland Heritage Register
- Official name: Commonwealth Bank of Australia, Australian Bank of Commerce Limited, Australian Joint Stock Bank
- Type: state heritage (built)
- Designated: 21 October 1992
- Reference no.: 600671
- Significant period: 1880s (fabric); 1881–ongoing (historical use)
- Significant components: residential accommodation – manager's house/quarters, banking chamber, safe
- Builders: Southall & Tracey

Commonwealth Bank Building is a heritage-listed bank building at 63 Victoria Street, Mackay, Mackay Region, Queensland, Australia. It was designed by Francis Drummond Greville Stanley and built in 1880 by Southall & Tracey. It is also known as Australian Bank of Commerce Limited and Australian Joint Stock Bank. It was added to the Queensland Heritage Register on 21 October 1992.

== History ==
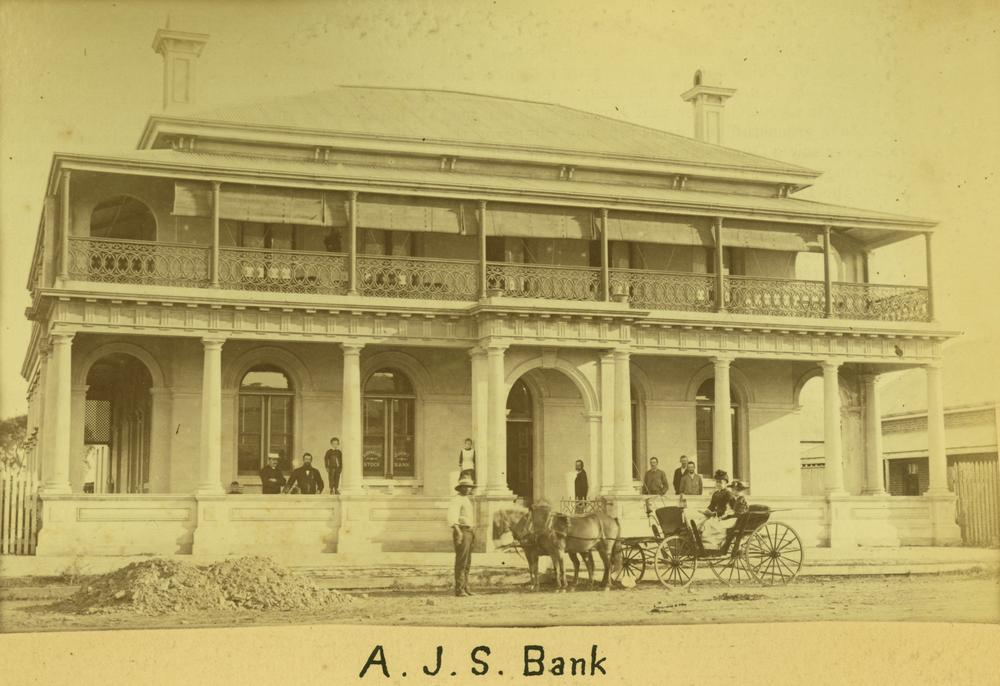
Australian Joint Stock Bank, Mackay, circa 1882

The Commonwealth Bank building was constructed in 1880 for the Australian Joint Stock Bank and is the oldest commercial building in Mackay.

The Australian Joint Stock Bank was established with the discovery of gold in southern states in 1852 and opened branches on Queensland goldfields as they were discovered. It opened a branch on the Broughton goldfield on 23 April 1872 and then established branches in other centres. The Mackay branch was opened in this building in 1881.

The town of Mackay is named for John Mackay who entered the valley of the Pioneer River in 1860 and established a pastoral run there in the following year. In 1862 a settlement was begun on the south bank of the river and by 1863, the township had been surveyed and the first lots of land sold. It was gazetted as a port of entry and a customs house was opened. The town prospered as a port and as a commercial and administrative centre, drawing business from nearby pastoral holdings and the sugar plantations being developed along the river. The 1880s saw an expansion in population as the Queensland economy enjoyed a boom and people poured into the colony. The sugar industry was also booming and Mackay continued to develop as an important regional centre.

The new Australian Joint Stock Bank was one of a number designed by Queensland Colonial Architect F D G Stanley, although the construction was supervised by Brisbane architect Arthur Josling. Stanley undertook a variety of private commissions during his term with the Queensland Public Works Department and knew Josling from his employment by the Department as a temporary draughtsman between November 1878 and June 1879. Brisbane builders Southall and Tracey carried out the work. Construction began in January 1880 and the bank opened on 5 February 1881.

Although suffering a devastating cyclone in 1918, Mackay enjoyed a period of substantial growth through the 1920s and 1930s, when it was the fastest-growing town in Queensland. This was largely because its connection to the railway system in 1924 improved access to markets and reduced transport costs, thus boosting not only the sugar industry but also the developing dairy and tourist industries.

The Australian Joint Stock Bank Limited had become the Australian Bank of Commerce in 1910 and traded under that name until 1931 when it was acquired by the Bank of New South Wales. In 1934 the Commonwealth Savings Bank moved into the building.

The Queensland Government Savings Bank established an agency in the Mackay Post Office on 3 January 1865. The Bank had been established in 1861 and was intended to encourage small deposit saving by working people. In 1864, the Savings Bank Bill provided a government guarantee to protect trustees and deposits and to allow depositors to easily transfer accounts. The Queensland Government Savings Bank merged with the Commonwealth Savings Bank in January 1921. The Mackay branch then leased the Customs House until they moved to the former Australian Bank of Commerce building.

The interior has been considerably changed by a series of refits and renovations carried out over the years.

Since 2014 the building has fallen into disrepair, after the Department of Heritage Protection forced builders to stop work because the owner Mr Arman hadn't applied properly to have repairs carried out. Negotiations since then have gone nowhere and even a 'show cause' notice from the department to Mr Arman was unanswered. As of January 2020 no repair or remedial work to stabilise the building has been undertaken. The buildings outer has been stripped back to bare bricks and is un-protected from the weather. Irreversible damage has now begun and it is feared the building will be lost . The local Regional Council has come under severe criticism from the public for taking no actions to preserve the building.

On 28 March 2024 a fire broke out in part of the building.

== Description ==
The bank building, now occupied by the Commonwealth Bank is, in keeping with other North Queensland bank buildings of the period, a two-storey building with a former residence on the upper floor. An extension has been attached on the east. The ground floor windows are modified within their surrounds with modern glazing and frames. The night safe is located in the front, on the left hand side.

The front consists of a seven-bay colonnade, of which the central bay is slightly narrower, but contains the entry and features a projecting one-storey portal, the entablature of which is free standing. The columns are round and stand on pedestals joined with a low wall. The entablature above the columns is enriched with classical triglyphs. The two central columns are positioned forward of the others as corner posts of the portal, the back of which is formed by square pillars topped by an arch.

The upper storey has more slender cast iron columns above the masonry lower ones, holding up the veranda roof of corrugated iron. The balustrade is formed with cast iron lace with a pattern based on overlapping circles. The main roof is hipped, its ridge at right angles to the street. Arched windows connect the veranda with the upper floor, containing paired glazed doors; the top pane of each is arched also. The roof is clad in corrugated iron and has a decoratively moulded chimney rises on the left side.

The stucco on both levels is ruled to resemble ashlar masonry. The lower veranda is ceiled with boards. The upper floor is also lined with boards. These differ being run on the rake, are narrow and contain a rib mould at each joint.

The bank chamber has a central main door as well as two further doors, which may be former windows with sills removed.

== Heritage listing ==
The Commonwealth Bank of Australia building was listed on the Queensland Heritage Register on 21 October 1992 having satisfied the following criteria.

The place is important in demonstrating the evolution or pattern of Queensland's history.

Mackay, as an important sugar centre, made a major contribution to the economy of Queensland and to the development of the North in the late 19th century The Commonwealth Bank, by the quality of its design and construction, demonstrates the importance of this regional branch and the prosperity of the city at that time. It is now the oldest commercial building in Mackay.

The place is important in demonstrating the principal characteristics of a particular class of cultural places.

The Commonwealth Bank building is a good example of its type and demonstrates the principal characteristics of a regional bank of its era, from the reassuring conservatism of the classically influenced design, to the layout, which provided a residence for the bank's manager on the upper floor.

The place is important because of its aesthetic significance.

It was designed by one of Queensland's most influential architects and has aesthetic value as a prominent and finely detailed building that makes an important contribution to the townscape of Mackay

The place has a special association with the life or work of a particular person, group or organisation of importance in Queensland's history.

The Commonwealth Bank, originally built for the Australian Joint Stock Bank, is important as a major commercial building by F.D.G. Stanley, who made a significant contribution to the development of the built environment in Queensland, both as the Colonial Architect and in private practice. It is also associated with the development of the Australian Joint Stock Bank, at one time the largest bank in Queensland.
