= Ipswich & West Moreton Building Society building =

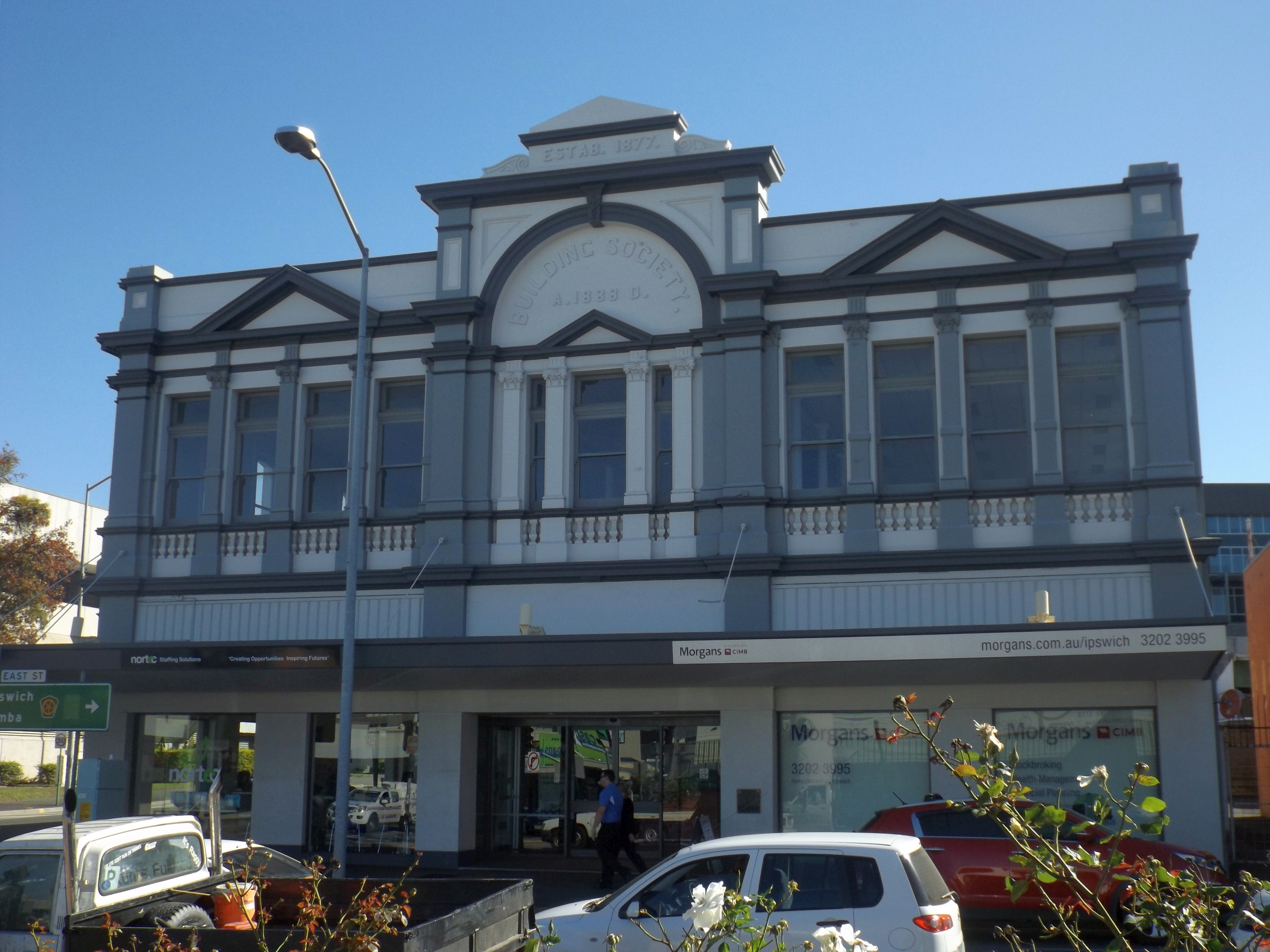
- Front of the building, 2016

- Location within Queensland Location within Australia
- 27.6153°S 152.7604°E
- Location: 45 East Street, Ipswich, City of Ipswich, Queensland, Australia

History
- Design period: 1870s–1890s (late 19th century)
- Built: 1888–1950s

Site notes
- Architect: Francis Drummond Greville Stanley

Queensland Heritage Register
- Official name: Ipswich & West Moreton Building Society
- Type: state heritage (built)
- Designated: 21 October 1992
- Reference no.: 600574
- Significant period: 1880s, 1910s (fabric); 1888–1996 (historical owner)
- Builders: Peter Brown

Ipswich & West Moreton Building Society is a heritage-listed building society office at 45 East Street, Ipswich, City of Ipswich, Queensland, Australia. It was designed by Francis Drummond Greville Stanley and built from 1888 to 1950s by Peter Brown. It was added to the Queensland Heritage Register on 21 October 1992.

== History ==
The former Ipswich and West Moreton Building Society building was constructed in 1888 to the design of the former Queensland Colonial Architect, F.G.D. Stanley. The Ipswich and West Moreton Building Society was the first building society established in Ipswich, and one of the first in Queensland. It was established in 1877 to meet a very real need for housing finance. A board of directors was appointed in July 1877 including chairman Enoch Bostock, directors E.W. Hargreaves, J. Scott and D. McKay, trustees W. Ginn, J. Mcfarlane and R. Tallon, surveyor S. Shenton and secretary T.W. Hoey. As there was no legislation covering building societies, the Ipswich society was registered in September 1877 under the Friendly Societies Act 1876. It was eventually registered again on 5 May 1887 when the Queensland Parliament passed the Building Society Act 1886. The tradition of building societies goes back to the beginning of the Industrial Revolution in England in the late 18th century. They were first formed by local members of working-class communities to help each other finance the building of houses, of which there was a severe lack in the new industrial centres. They were a part of the self-help and mutual aid movement which saw the birth of friendly societies and trade unions as well as building societies in response to the lack of social welfare and protection for working class members of society. The first building society legislation in Australia came about in 1840 and from the beginnings of building societies in Australia in the nineteenth century they became an important part of the financial market during the 20th century. With the turn of the 21st century many of the original building societies have been taken over by larger financial institutions.

At first, the operations of the Ipswich and West Moreton Building Society were carried on in an office shared with Mr Bostock in Brisbane Street, Ipswich. Mindful of future needs, the Society purchased an allotment at the corner of East and Limestone Streets from James Foote in 1887, at the cost of £1,600. The following year, a two storey brick building with a large basement was erected at a cost of £4,052. The architect was FDG Stanley, the former Queensland Colonial Architect, and the building contractor was Peter Brown. Part of the building was initially leased to the Queensland Woollen Manufacturing Co Ltd, and the clothing manufacturer Bishop and Woodward.

The architect, F.D.G Stanley was the former Queensland Colonial Architect from 1872 to 1881 as well being a prolific architect in private practice. He was one of the most prominent and prolific architects in nineteenth century Queensland demonstrating a high level of quality and diversity in his many works. Some of his buildings include The General Post Office, Queen Street, Brisbane (1871–72), The Supreme Court, Brisbane (1874–75) and in Ipswich the Congregational Church (1869–70) and the Governor Blackall Memorial in Toowong Cemetery (1879–80).

The building was enlarged in 1912, due to the expansion of its major tenant, Bishop and Woodward. A further triple-hipped roof brick section, at a cost of £1,245, appears to have been added to the rear. The architect was George Brockwell Gill, and the contractors Hastie and Halliwell.

The architect, George Brockwell Gill, designed many of the grand residences and public buildings in Ipswich from the 1880s to the 1930s. Some of his works include "Brynhyfryd" for Lewis Thomas (1889/90), Ipswich Girls' Grammar School (1890/91), St Paul's Rectory (1895), the Ipswich Club (1916), the Ipswich Technical College (1901), and supervision of the construction of the Walter Burley Griffin Incinerator in 1936. Gill emigrated from London and settled in Ipswich in 1886 where he commenced work as an architect for the firm of Samuel Shenton. Gill took over Shenton's practice in 1889 when Shenton retired. Gill had been elected Associate of the Queensland Institute of Architects in 1904 and Fellow by 1913. He was its Vice-President in 1914–16 and President in 1918–19.

The Ipswich and West Moreton Building Society survived the depression of the 1890s and the building itself survived the flood of 1893 when the water rose to the first floor of the building. It continued to operate during the first and second world wars and the disastrous years of the Great Depression. In the 1970s branches were established in leased premises at Booval and Goodna, and further branches, sub-branches and agencies were subsequently established in other places in the south-east Queensland region.

Bishop and Woodward closed in March 1959, and the Society's premises were altered again. Six ground floor shops were constructed, designed by architect RF Franklin, and built by contractor TP Turner. A further modernisation of the shop fronts was undertaken in 1976–77, as well as extensive interior remodelling by architects Lumley and Tait Pty Ltd.

On 4 November 1996 the Ipswich and West Moreton Building Society merged with the First Provincial Building Society which in turn was taken over by the First Australian Building Society in December 1997 both of which occupied the old East Street building. The building was later owned and occupied by the Bendigo Bank. In 2015, the building is available for lease.

== Description ==
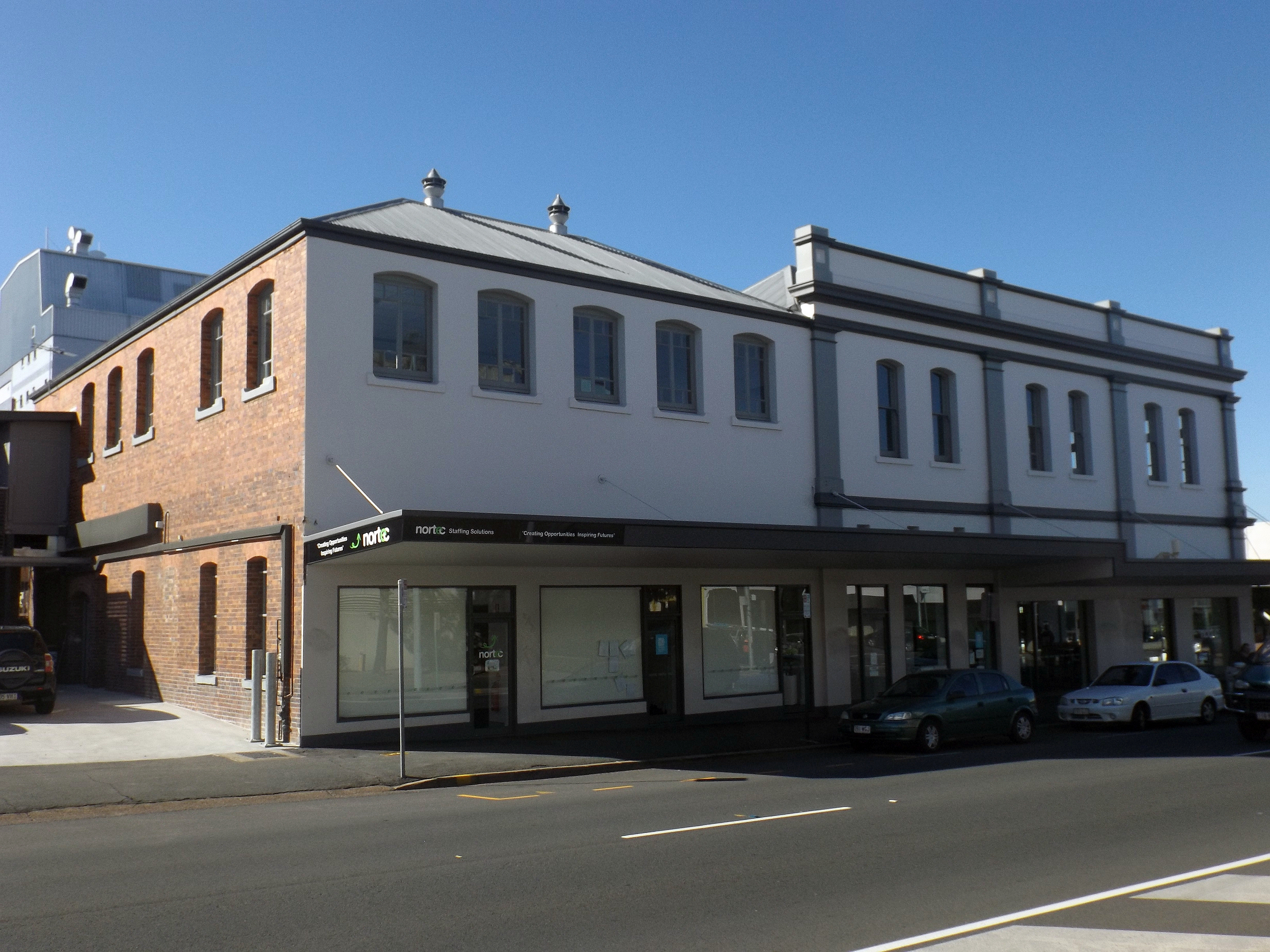
View from Limestone Street, 2016

The former Ipswich and West Moreton Building Society is an imposing two storeyed building set on the corner of Limestone and East streets. It is constructed of brick which has been rendered and painted on two street frontages with face brick on the rear and side elevations. The building was constructed in three separate stages, the front section in 1888, the centre section was built in 1912 and the rear amenities block was probably constructed in the 1950s. The different stages of construction can be clearly seen on each side facade with different roof, brick and window types apparent.

The East Street facade of the building is symmetrical and divided into three parts, with a central section rising above the parapet which conceals the roof line behind. The central section contains a semicircular arch containing the words "Building Society 1888 AD" in relief, crowned with a pediment with "Estab 1877" underneath. The keystone of the arch features a symbol consisting of a wand with entwined snakes which was associated with good luck and commerce. Each side of the central section contains pilasters with composite capitals supporting an entablature and pediment. The awning over the footpath and the shop fronts on the street level are recent.

The Limestone street facade is less elaborate and is of rendered brickwork. The parapet continues around to conceal the roofline of the 1888 section while the hip roof of the 1912 section is exposed. The earlier section contains timber double-hung windows with flat arch window heads, while the 1912 part of the building has timber five- light casement windows.

The interior of the building has been extensively remodelled with new partitioning and suspended ceilings. A mezzanine floor has been inserted into the original banking chamber. Very few original interior elements are visible apart from the window joinery which has been partly concealed by suspended ceilings.

== Heritage listing ==
Ipswich & West Moreton Building Society was listed on the Queensland Heritage Register on 21 October 1992 having satisfied the following criteria.

The place is important in demonstrating the evolution or pattern of Queensland's history.

The former Ipswich and West Moreton Building Society building is important in demonstrating the evolution of Queensland's history being an example of the growth of Queensland's financial institutions, particularly building societies, in response to the need for funding for affordable housing. It also reflected the expansion of Ipswich as a commercial centre in the 1880s and subsequently the increased building activity which was taking place in the city centre.

The place is important because of its aesthetic significance.

The building possesses aesthetic significance for the fine detail of its East Street facade and for its streetscape value, enhanced by its prominent corner position in the centre of the city of Ipswich.

The place has a strong or special association with a particular community or cultural group for social, cultural or spiritual reasons.

It has special association with the Ipswich and West Moreton Building Society which operated in the building from 1888 to 1996.

The place has a special association with the life or work of a particular person, group or organisation of importance in Queensland's history.

It also has special association with the work of former Queensland colonial architect, FDG Stanley, who designed the building, and the architect of the additions, G. Brockwell Gill.
