= First Australian Building Society =

- Type: Public; ASX: FST
- Industry: Banking
- Founded: 1997
- Defunct: 1 September 2001
- Headquarters: Ipswich

First Australian Building Society was a building society that operated in Queensland between 1997 and 2000.

== History ==
The Ipswich & West Moreton Building Society, established in 1877, merged with the First Provincial Building Society on 4 November 1996.

First Australian was established in December 1997 with a merger of First Provincial Building Society, Northern Building Society and Sunstate Credit Union to create Queenslands largest building society.

== Operation ==
The society's main activities were retail investments and mortgages, with other services including commercial lending, consumer lending, credit card facilities and business products.

First Australian operated two brands, "Northern Building Society" in North Queensland and "First Provincial Building Society" in Southern Queensland, with a total of 48 branches and 20 agencies across Queensland, and 430 staff.

The building society was listed on the Australian Stock Exchange as "FST".

On 5 June 2000 First Australian and Bendigo Bank announced a merger and on 1 September 2001 the merger completed. Directors Neal Axelby and Terry O'Dwyer were appointed to the board of Bendigo Bank.
