= Union Bank of Australia Building (Fremantle) =

Heritage building in Fremantle, Western Australia

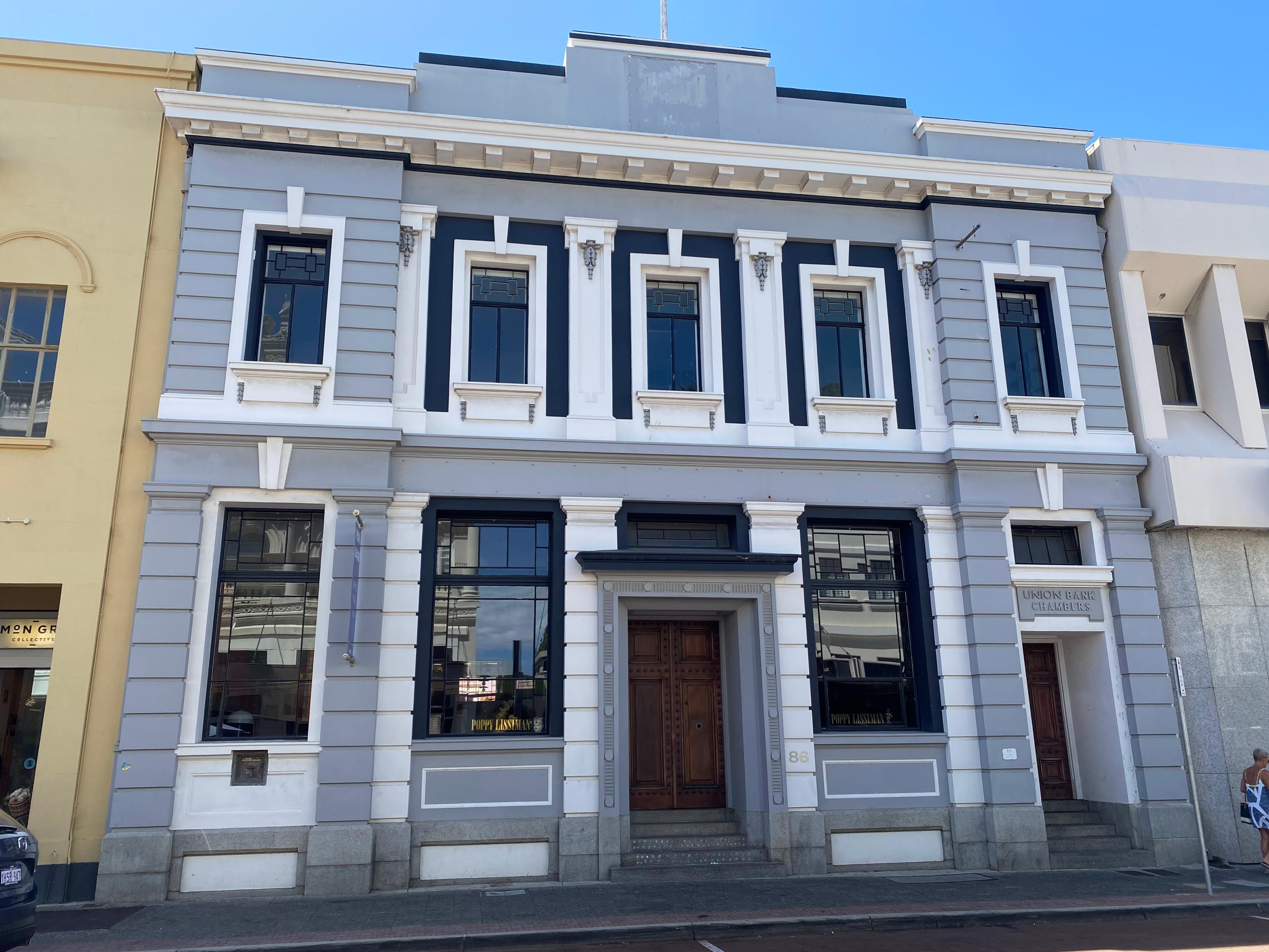
- Union Bank Building in 2023
- Interactive map of the Union Bank of Australia Building area
- Alternative names: ANZ Bank Building

General information
- Architectural style: Inter-War Free Classical style
- Location: 86 High Street, Fremantle, Western Australia
- Coordinates: 32.054521°S 115.745675°E
- Completed: 1930
- Cost: £A 17,000
- Client: Union Bank of Australia

Technical details
- Floor count: 2

Design and construction
- Architecture firm: Hobbs, Smith & Forbes
- Main contractor: R. V. Ritchie

Western Australia Heritage Register
- Type: State Registered Place
- Part of: West End, Fremantle (25225)
- Reference no.: 924

The former Union Bank of Australia Building, also known as the ANZ Bank Building, is a heritage listed building located at 86 High Street in the Fremantle West End Heritage area. It was one of many commercial buildings constructed in Fremantle during the interwar period.

The two storey building was constructed in 1930.

The site was formerly known as 84 High Street and was the address of four shops that occupied the site prior to 1930. The building was designed by Hobbs, Smith and Forbes and built for the Union Bank of Australia by the builder R. V. Ritchie.

Constructed in the Inter-War Free Classical style the building was made from rendered brick with an ashlar effect and has a breakfront where the centre of the building is recessed.

The building has a basement along with the two storeys above and occupies 15 metres (48 ft) of street frontage. the side stairway entrance leads to large offices on the second floor. The cost of the building was estimated at £A 17,000, equivalent to A$1.6 million in 2022.

The bank put its old premises at the corner of Cliff Street and High Street up for sale in July 1930.

In 1951 the Bank of Australasia merged with the Union Bank of Australia to form the Australia and New Zealand Bank Limited The name of the bank remained on the site until between 1952 and 1956 when it was renamed as the Australia and New Zealand Bank. The property was renovated in 1960 and 1969. The bank continued to use part of the building until 1990 when it relocated and put the site up for auction. It was eventually sold in mid-1991 and opened as a market later the same year selling glassware, ceramics and toys. The markets closed down about a year later.

== See also ==
List of heritage places in Fremantle
