= Australian Joint Stock Bank =

Nineteenth century bank in New South Wales

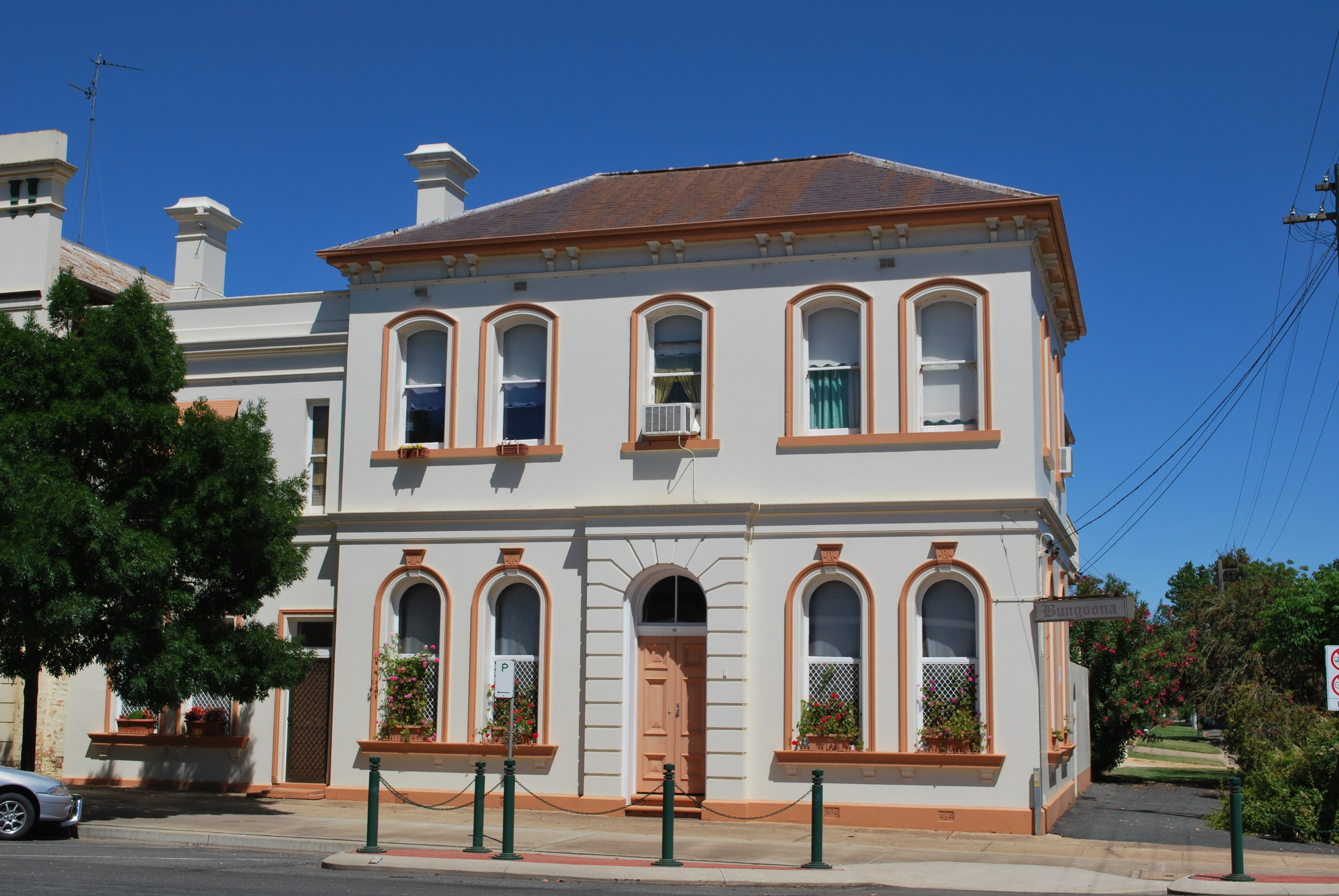
Former Australian Joint Stock Bank at Narrandera, New South Wales

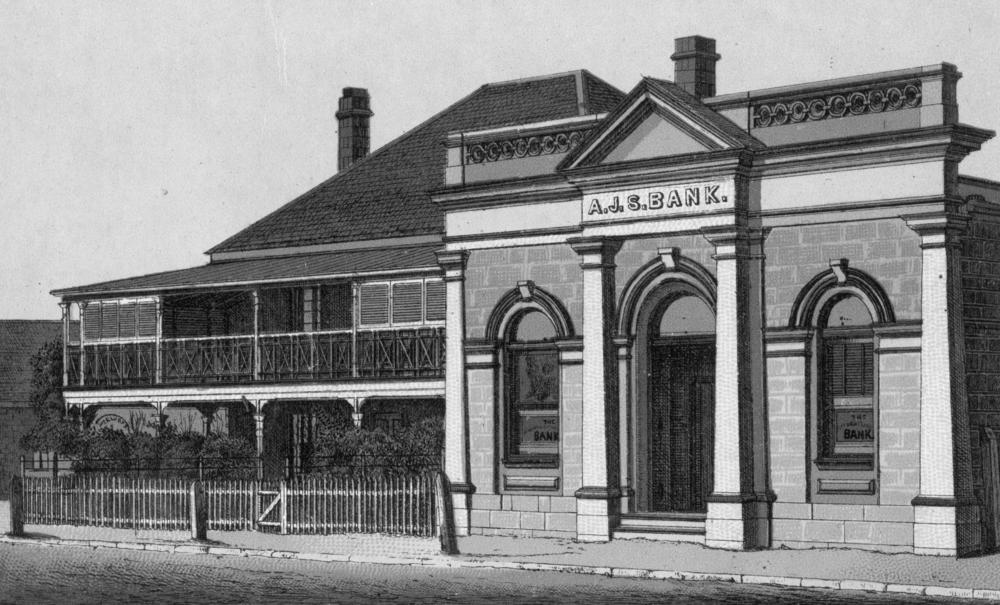
Australian Joint Stock Bank, Warwick, Queensland, circa 1886

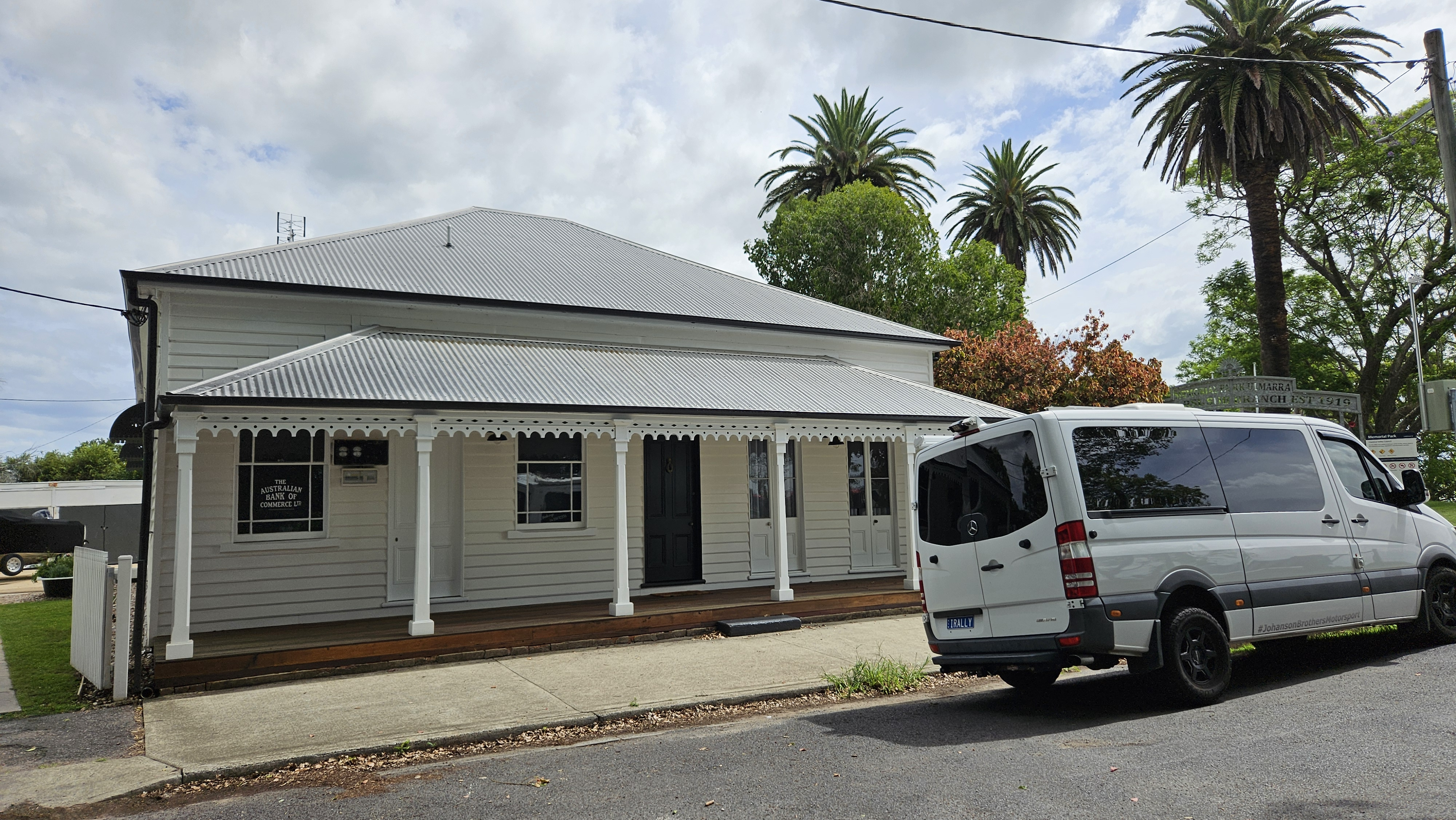
Australian Bank of Commerce, Ulmarra, NSW

The Australian Joint Stock Bank was a bank in Australia. It operated from 1852 to 1910, after which it became the Australian Bank of Commerce and then was taken over by the Bank of New South Wales in 1931.

== History ==
The Australian Joint Stock Bank was created in 1852 by an Act of the New South Wales Parliament. It issued its first banknotes in 1862.

In 1910, the Australian Bank of Commerce was registered in New South Wales under the Joint Stock Companies Act to take over the Australian Joint Stock Bank. In 1917 it acquired the City Bank of Sydney.

In 1931, the Bank of New South Wales (now Westpac) acquired the Australian Bank of Commerce.

== Heritage buildings ==
Some of the former bank's buildings are now heritage-listed, including:

- Australian Joint Stock Bank Building, Maryborough
- Australian Joint Stock Bank Building, Townsville
- Gympie Stock Exchange (originally built for the Australian Joint Stock Bank)
- Commonwealth Bank Building, Mackay (originally built for the Australian Joint Stock Bank)
