= Union Bank of Australia =

Former bank in Australia and New Zealand

Union Bank of Australia Limited
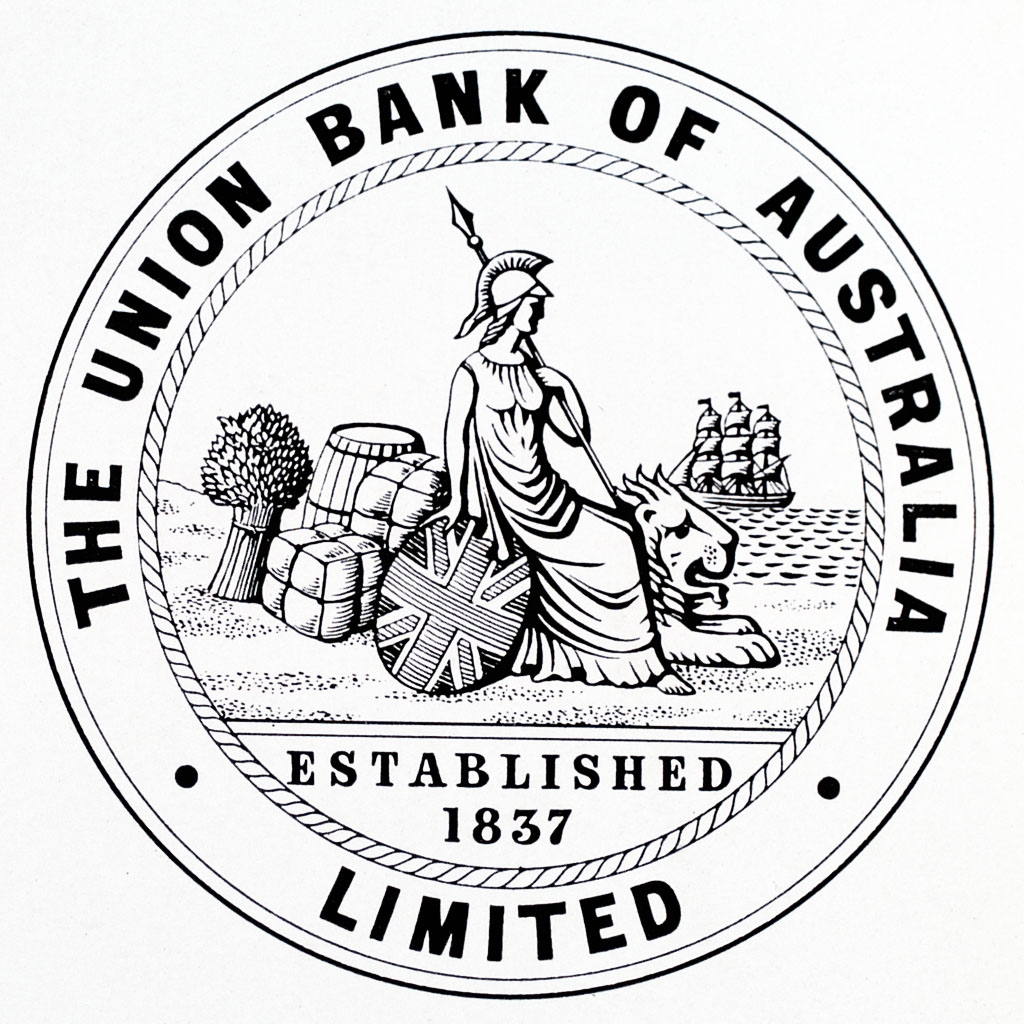
- Type: Bank
- Industry: financial service activities, except insurance and pension funding
- Founded: 1837
- Defunct: 1951
- Fate: Merged with Bank of Australasia to form Australia and New Zealand Bank Limited
- Headquarters: London, England
- Area served: Australia and New Zealand

The Union Bank of Australia was a bank that operated in Australia and New Zealand from 1837 to 1951.

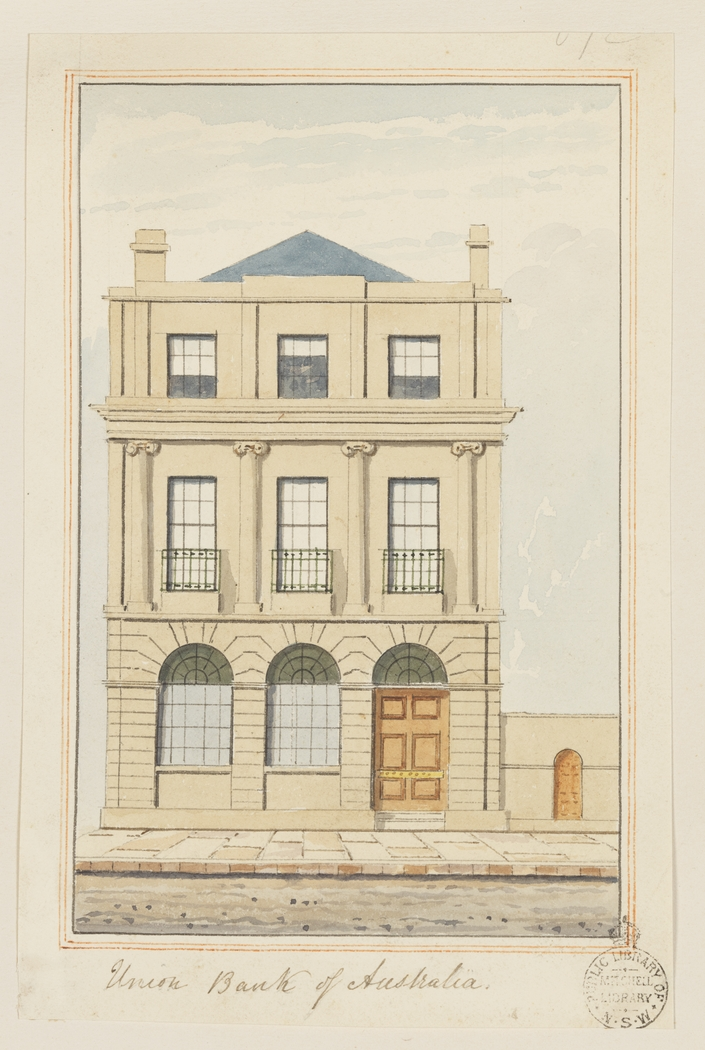
Union Bank of Australia, Sydney branch, 1840s

The Union Bank was established in London in October 1837 with a subscribed capital of £500,000. The foundation of the bank followed a visit to England by Van Diemen's Land banker Philip Oakden, who sought to establish a large joint-stock bank operating across the Australasian colonies. During his visit, Oakden gained the support of businessman and banker George Fife Angas, founder of the South Australian Company. Upon Oakden's return, the new bank absorbed his struggling Launceston-based Tamar Bank and opened its first branch in the Tamar Bank premises on 1 May 1838.

The Union Bank expanded rapidly, establishing a branch in Victoria on 18 October 1838 after acquiring the Melbourne business of the Tasmanian Derwent Bank, the city's first bank. A Sydney branch was opened on 2 January 1839.

The bank expanded internationally, opening its first New Zealand branch in Wellington in 1840. Initially, it agreed with the Bank of South Australia, where Angas was also a director, not to operate in South Australia. However, an Adelaide branch was eventually established in 1850. The bank opened a Brisbane branch in 1858 and a Perth branch in 1878.

The Union Bank of Australia became a limited liability company in 1880. The bank remained solvent during the economic crises of the 1890s, acquiring the Bank of South Australia in 1892.

By its centenary in 1937, the bank operated 267 branches and agencies across Australia and New Zealand.

In 1951, the Union Bank merged with the Bank of Australasia to form the Australia and New Zealand Bank Limited, now known as ANZ.

== Historic former branches ==
A number of the bank's former branches are now heritage-listed. These include:

- the Orange, New South Wales branch
- the Albany, Western Australia branch
- the first Fremantle, Western Australia branch
- the second Fremantle, Western Australia branch
- the Maryborough, Queensland branch
- the Rockhampton, Queensland branch
- the Townsville, Queensland branch
