= Francis Drummond Greville Stanley =

Australian architect (1839 - 1897)

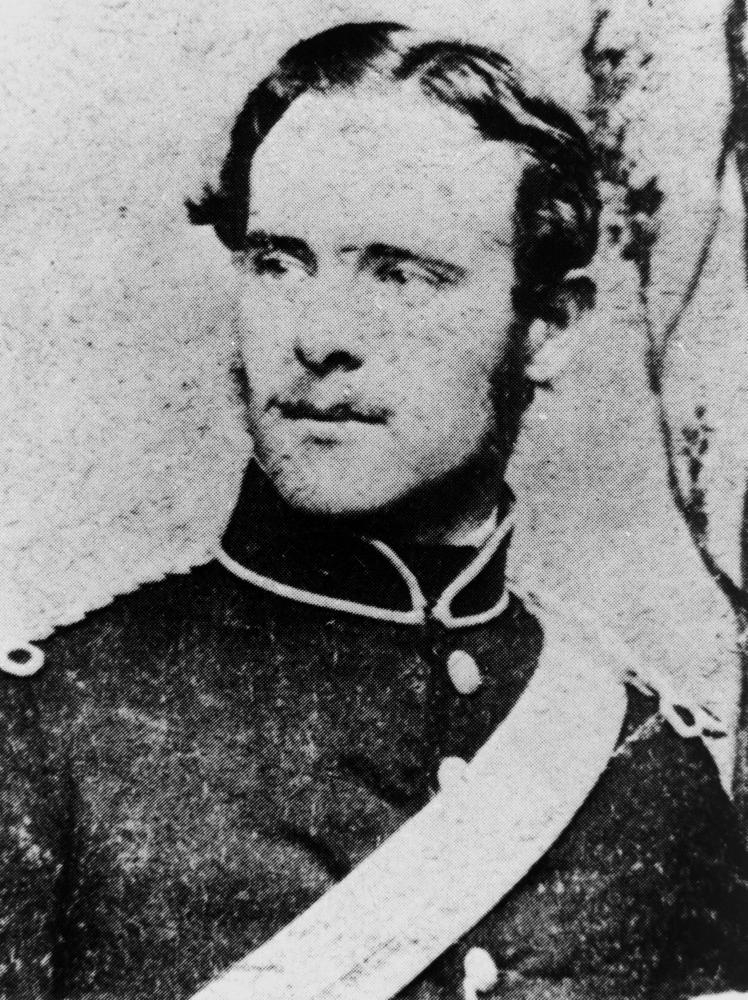
Francis Drummond Greville Stanley

Francis Drummond Greville Stanley (1839–1897) was an architect in Queensland, Australia. He was the Queensland Colonial Architect. Many of his designs are now heritage-listed buildings.

== Early life ==
Stanley was born in Edinburgh, Scotland, on 1 January 1839, the son of actor and painter Montague Talbot Stanley and his wife Mary Susan (née Eyre).

Stanley studied and practised architecture in Edinburgh, prior to emigrating to Brisbane in 1861–62. There, he joined the Lands Department in 1863 and became the chief clerk of works, under the Colonial Architect Charles Tiffin.

On 27 April 1865, he married Margaret Bennet at Toowoomba.

His younger brother, Henry Charles Stanley, was also an early immigrant to Queensland, becoming the Chief Engineer of the Queensland railways. His niece, Gwendolyn Stanley was an artist.

== Career ==
Stanley was himself appointed to the post of Queensland Colonial Architect in July 1873. He held the post until 1881.

== Works ==
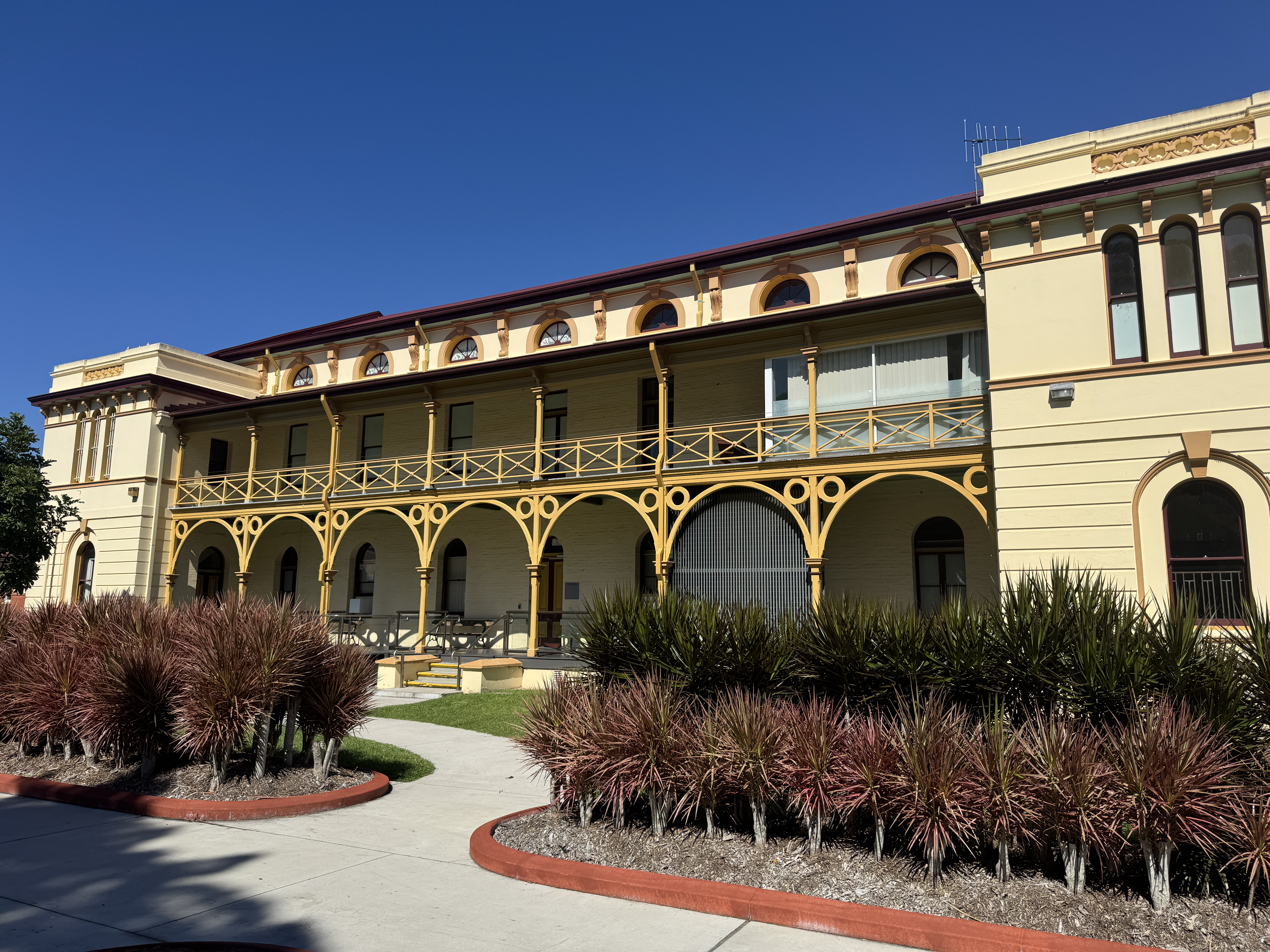
Maryborough Court House, viewed from Queen's Park, 2025.

- 1872: General Post Office, Brisbane
- 1873: Roma Street railway station, Brisbane
- 1874: the first Cape Capricorn Light, near Rockhampton
- 1877: Maryborough Courthouse
- 1879: Supreme Court of Queensland, Brisbane
- 1879: St Paul's Anglican Church, Maryborough
- 1879: Queensland National Bank (former), Townsville
- 1880: Toowoomba Post Office
- 1882: Australian Joint Stock Bank Building, Maryborough
- 1882: Queensland Club
- 1883: the rectory of Christ Church, Milton, Brisbane
- 1884: Union Bank of Australia (now Perc Tucker Regional Gallery), Townsville
- 1884: first Lennons Hotel in Brisbane
- 1888: Australian Joint Stock Bank Building (former), Townsville
- 1889: Tighnabruaich, Indooroopilly, a residence built for his brother, Henry.
- 1893: St Ann's Industrial School, now part of All Hallows' School, Brisbane

== Later years ==
Stanley was interested in astronomy and built an observatory at his home. It was equipped with a powerful telescope, housed under a retractable roof. He used this to observe the transit of Mercury, in November 1894.

In August 1896, Stanley took up government employment again as an Inspector of Works.

Stanley died of tuberculosis on Friday 28 May 1897, at his home Ardencraig in Church Street - later Jephson Street - in the Toowong district of Brisbane. With classic symptoms of extrapulmonary TB, he had caught a chill three weeks previously, which developed into a paralysis of his lower body. He was buried in Toowong Cemetery.

His widow Margaret died on 14 September 1921 at Witherslack, Chelmer and was buried in the Anglican Cemetery of St. Matthews, in neighbouring Sherwood.
