= George Gill =

George Gill may refer to:

== Sports ==
- George Gill (cricketer) (1876–1937), English player for Somerset, Leicestershire and London
- George Gill (Australian footballer) (1892–1967), Australian rules footballer
- George Gill (English footballer) (1894–?), English footballer
- George Gill (pitcher) (1909–1999), American baseball player
- George Gill (first baseman) (fl. 1930s), American Negro leagues baseball player

== Others ==
- George M. Gill (1803–1887), American attorney, businessman, and politician
- George Reynolds Gill (1828–1904), English portrait painter
- George Brockwell Gill (1857–1954), architect in Queensland, Australia
- George W. Gill, American anthropologist

== See also ==
- George Gill Green (1842–1925), American entrepreneur and soldier
