= Hotel Metropole, Ipswich =

Hotel Metropole
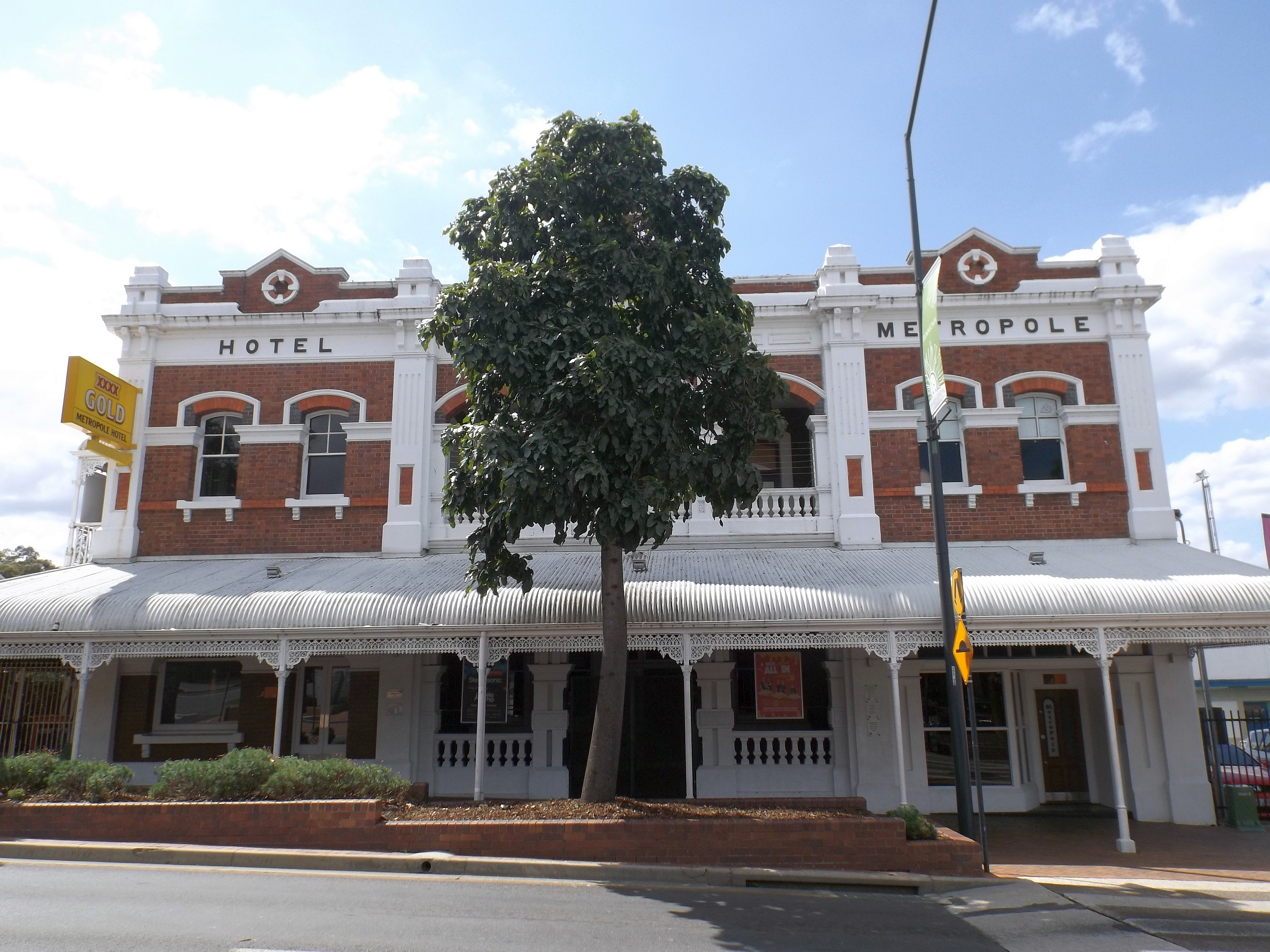
- Front of building, 2015

- Location within Queensland Location within Australia
- 27.6146°S 152.7542°E
- Location: 253 Brisbane Street, West Ipswich, City of Ipswich, Queensland, Australia

History
- Design period: 1900–1914 (early 20th century)
- Built: 1906

Site notes
- Architect: George Brockwell Gill
- Architectural style: Federation

Queensland Heritage Register
- Official name: Hotel Metropole
- Type: state heritage (built)
- Designated: 21 October 1992
- Reference no.: 600567
- Significant period: 1900s (fabric); 1906–ongoing (historical use)
- Significant components: loggia/s, lead light/s, cellar

Hotel Metropole is a heritage-listed hotel at 253 Brisbane Street, West Ipswich, City of Ipswich, Queensland, Australia. It was designed by George Brockwell Gill and built in 1906. It was added to the Queensland Heritage Register on 21 October 1992.

== History ==
The two storey brick hotel was constructed in 1906 to the design of prominent Ipswich architect George Brockwell Gill. In 1915 part of the surrounding property was resumed by the Queensland Railways Department. In 1925 the brewers Perkins & Co took over the lease until 1935 as part of a widespread accumulation of hotels by the company throughout Queensland. When Perkins & Co merged with Castlemaine in 1928 to form Castlemaine Perkins the brewery held licences for 19 freehold hotels and 50 leasehold hotels including the Hotel Metropole in Ipswich.

The architect, George Brockwell Gill, designed many of the grand residences and public buildings in Ipswich from the 1880s to the 1930s. Some of his works include "Brynhyfryd" for Lewis Thomas (1889/90), Ipswich Girls' Grammar School (1890/91), St Paul's Rectory (1895), the Ipswich Club House (1916), The Ipswich Technical College (1901), and supervision of the construction of the Walter Burley Griffin Incinerator in 1936. Gill emigrated from London and settled in Ipswich in 1886 where he commenced work as an architect for the firm of Samuel Shenton. Gill took over Shenton's practice in 1889 when Shenton retired. Gill had been elected Associate of the Queensland Institute of Architects in 1904 and Fellow by 1913. He was its Vice-President in 1914–16 and President in 1918–19.

The building has been used as hotel since opening in 1906 and continues as a hotel and nightclub today. In 1997, it was renamed The Harp of Erin, and later as the Silver Fern, but reverted to the Hotel Metropole name by the mid-2000s. In 2015, it contains the Waghorn gastropub and Club Metro nightclub, but retains the overall Hotel Metropole branding.

== Description ==
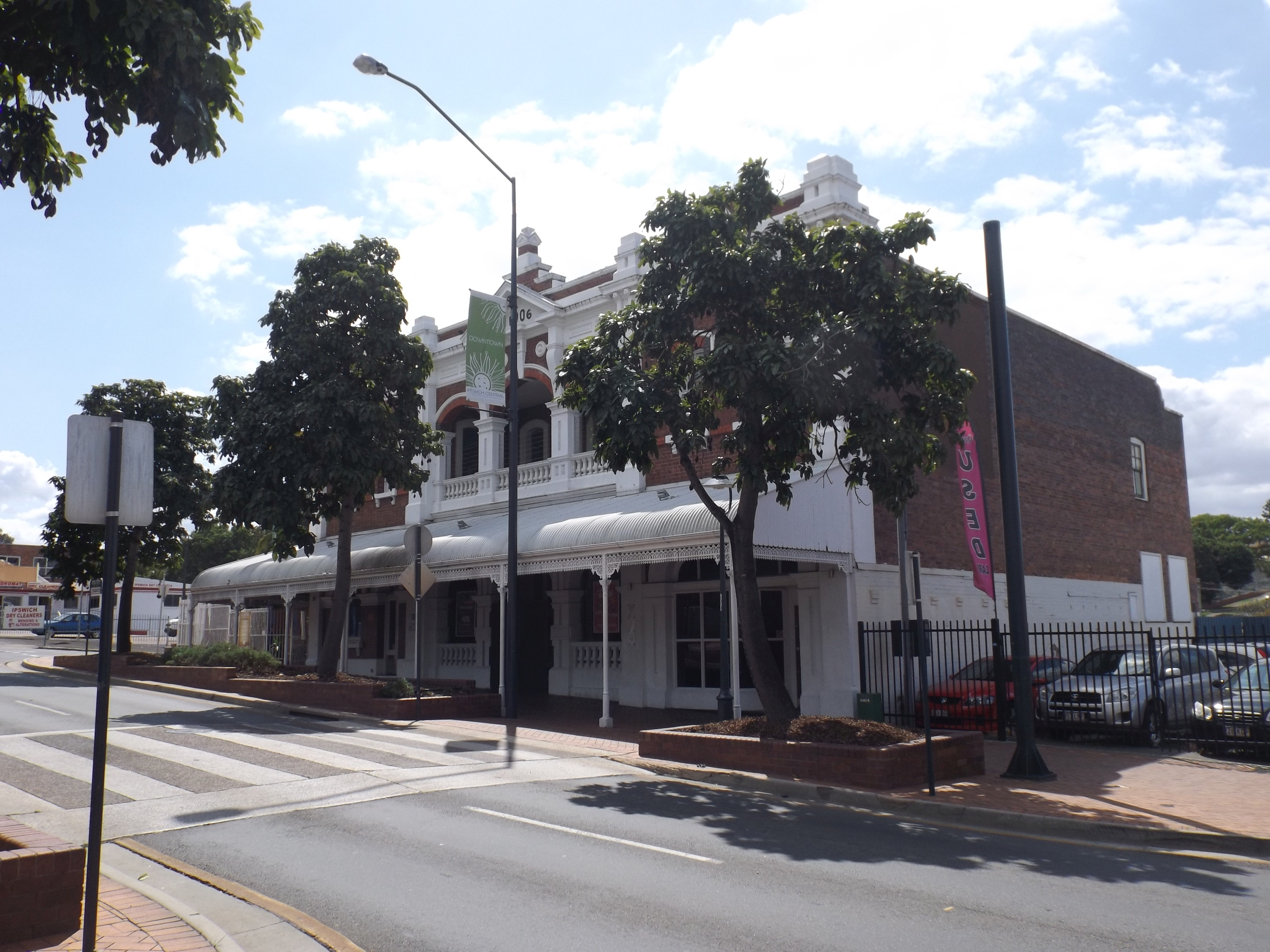
Building in 2015

The Hotel Metropole is a substantial two storeyed hotel with basement located on the north-eastern corner of Brisbane and Waghorn Streets at Ipswich. Built in 1906, the hotel is constructed of tuck pointed red brickwork of flemish bond heavily decorated with contrasting coloured brickwork and cement rendered dressings. The skyline is highlighted with decorative gables to the Brisbane Street parapet which conceals a hipped corrugated iron roof behind.

The principal facade to Brisbane Street is symmetrically composed around central loggia to ground and first floor. The main entrance to the building is via the ground floor loggia which is heavily decorated with painted cement rendered arches, columns and balusters and secured with cast iron grilles. Tessellated tiles line the floor. Additional arched entrances to bar areas are located either side of the loggia with a further entrance located off Waghorn street which currently opens into a more recently constructed beer garden that is fenced off from street access. The ground floor verandah to Brisbane and Waghorn Street elevations has timber posts, a cast iron valance and a recently replaced steel roof structure with curved Colorbond roof sheeting and slotted ogee guttering.

The first floor loggia has stilted arches of contrasting brickwork with columns, pilasters, keystones and other cement rendered elements. The remainder of the facade is relieved with contrasting cement rendered dressings, sills, string courses, pilasters, entablature and pediment. The Waghorn Street facade includes a first floor verandah with a balustrade and valance in a sunflower pattern which was common in Victoria on boom era houses and hotels and was registered as pattern no:VIC 444 by J Cochrane & G Scott 17 November 1887. At the rear, the "back of house" functions are expressed on the exterior of the building to Waghorn Street by a step in the parapet and the change in window treatment.

A timber framed cantilevered verandah with cast iron balustrade of a less elaborate detail is located on the rear elevation and overlooks the railway line. The exterior joinery is generally intact and comprises double hung windows with four light upper sashes to segmental arched windows, multi-paned fanlights with circular lights to other arched openings and four panel doors.

The main entrance to the building opens off the loggia and provides access to bars either side and to the entrance to the stair hall leading to the accommodation on the first floor. The floor is lined with later parquetry with rendered walls and a pressed metal ceiling.

The entrance to the main stair hall has a fixed arched fanlight above the door with the words "Hotel Metropole 1906" etched into it. The stair hall also has a pressed metal and contains a substantial and elaborately detailed cedar stair. An arched window with decorative leadlight.

The main bar area to the west of the hall has been substantially altered with the removal of several walls to form one main bar area on the principal corner of the building. Remnant walls have been retained as lintels to allow original plaster ceilings, cornices and ceiling roses to survive. A marble fireplace is located on the northern wall of the main bar and the floors are of timber covered with later linings. The bar area to the east of the hall has been heavily refurbished and little of its early interior is evident.

A kitchen, secondary stair and recently refurbished toilet facilities are housed at the rear of the building. The secondary stair provides access to the upper floor as well as to the basement and service entrance. The basement has a low floor to ceiling height and is used for storage.

The upper floor of the hotel generally retains its early layout and contains accommodation rooms and a common room on the western side of the stair hall. The eastern side has been altered and fitted out as a nightclub. The rear of the building houses single rooms and the bathrooms with internal timber partition walls lined with v jointed tongue and groove boards, timber floors and timber ceilings.

Much of the interior joinery on both levels is intact and generally appears to be cedar.

== Heritage listing ==
Hotel Metropole was listed on the Queensland Heritage Register on 21 October 1992 having satisfied the following criteria.

The place is important in demonstrating the evolution or pattern of Queensland's history.

Erected in 1906, the Hotel Metropole demonstrates a period of renewed building activity in Ipswich around the turn of the 20th century. It was one of many substantial public brick buildings constructed during this period and the striking nature of the building also reflects the importance of the local hotel in communities of the era.

The place is important in demonstrating the principal characteristics of a particular class of cultural places.

The Hotel Metropole is a good example of a reasonably intact Federation hotel displaying fine detailing evidence of its original design throughout the building.

The place is important because of its aesthetic significance.

For its architectural and aesthetic value and as a landmark within the city which contributes to the Brisbane Street streetscape and to the townscape.

The place has a strong or special association with a particular community or cultural group for social, cultural or spiritual reasons.

The Hotel Metropole has special association with the local community of Ipswich as a place of social activity since its opening in 1906.

The place has a special association with the life or work of a particular person, group or organisation of importance in Queensland's history.

It is also important as a prominent and characteristic example of the work of George Brockwell Gill, the Ipswich architect responsible for numerous significant domestic and civic buildings in the city.
