= Charleville War Memorial =

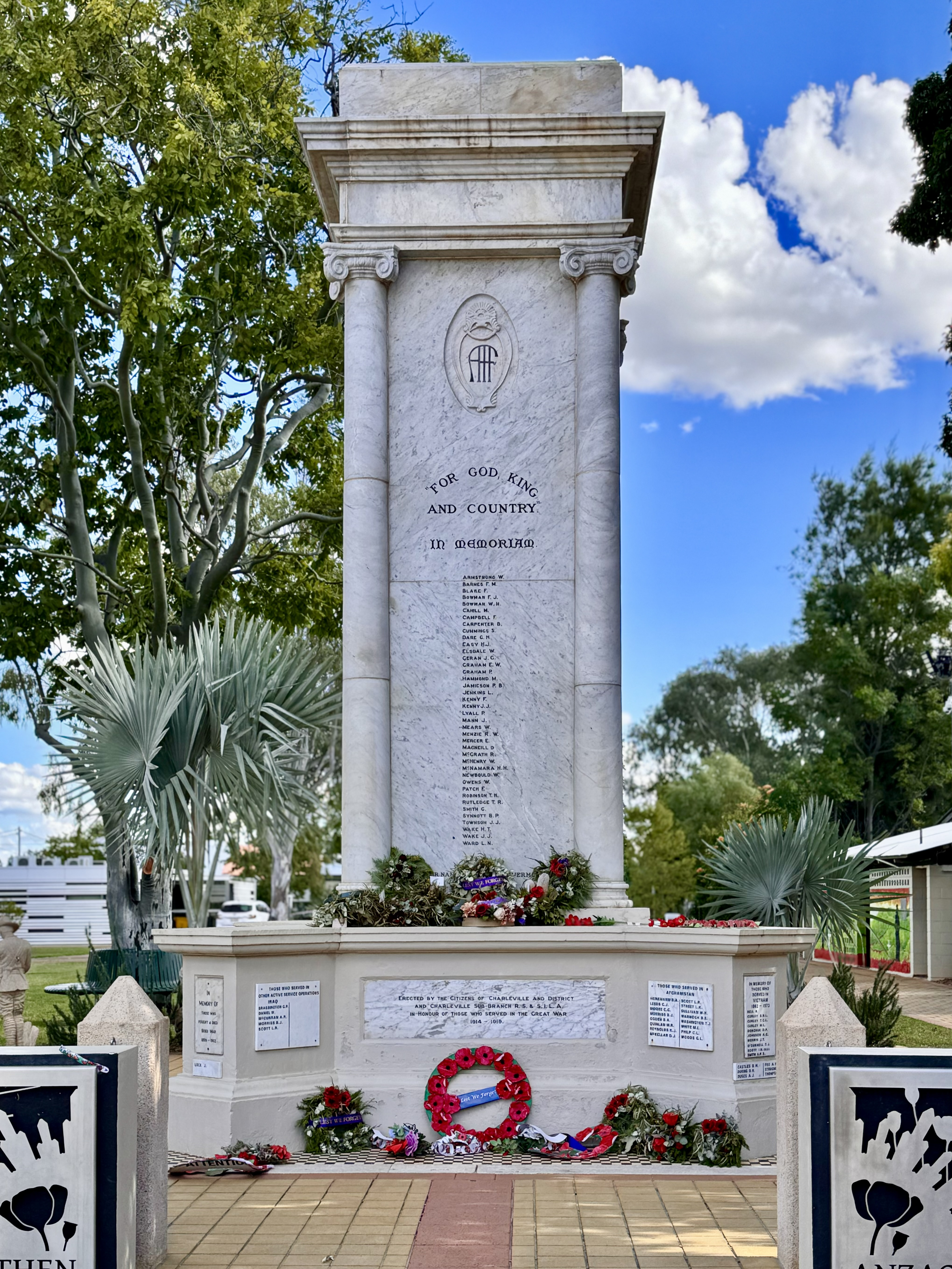
- Charleville War Memorial, 2024

- Location within Queensland
- 26.4031°S 146.2407°E
- Location: Edward Street, Charleville, Shire of Murweh, Queensland, Australia

History
- Design period: 1919–1930s (interwar period)
- Built: 1924

Site notes
- Architect: George Brockwell Gill

Queensland Heritage Register
- Official name: Charleville War Memorial
- Type: state heritage (built)
- Designated: 21 October 1992
- Reference no.: 600758
- Significant period: 1924– (social)
- Significant components: park / green space, pathway/walkway, gate – entrance, war trophy/ies, memorial/monument, fence/wall – perimeter, memorial surrounds/railings, flagpole/flagstaff
- Builders: R C Ziegler and Son

Charleville War Memorial is a heritage-listed war memorial at Edward Street, Charleville, Shire of Murweh, Queensland, Australia. It was designed by George Brockwell Gill and built in 1924 by R C Ziegler and Son. It was added to the Queensland Heritage Register on 21 October 1992.

== History ==
The Charleville War Memorial was unveiled on 9 October 1924 by the Queensland Governor Sir Matthew Nathan. It is thought to have been designed by George Brockwell Gill and cost £1000. The predominantly marble memorial honours the 310 local men who served in the First World War, including the 40 fallen.

The memorial was:

"Erected by the citizens of Charleville and district, and Charleville sub-branch of the Returned Services League".

The cast-iron fence was subsequently erected some time between 1925 and 1933.

In 1864, the Queensland Government Gazette proclaimed the boundaries of the Warrego Pastoral District. This followed the arrival of farmers from New South Wales in search of sheep runs on the Upper Warrego River district. The town of Charleville was gazetted in 1868 and laid out by government surveyor William Alcock Tully in the usual grid form, allowing for the roads to be wide enough for large bullock trains to turn in. By 1880, the area had developed into a small town which continued to prosper as a resting point on the stock routes. Development was further encouraged by the Western railway, which reached Charleville in 1888, and the establishment of Cobb and Co in 1890. Other businesses were established to support the growing infrastructure; however, the pastoral properties continued to be the town's main asset.

Australia, and Queensland in particular, had few civic monuments before the First World War. The memorials erected in its wake became our first national monuments, recording the devastating impact of the war on a young nation. Australia lost 60,000 from a population of about 4 million, representing one in five of those who served. No previous or subsequent war has made such an impact on the nation.

Even before the end of the war, memorials became a spontaneous and highly visible expression of national grief. To those who erected them, they were as sacred as grave sites, substitute graves for the Australians whose bodies lay in battlefield cemeteries in Europe and the Middle East. British policy decreed that the Empire war dead were to be buried where they fell. The word "cenotaph", commonly applied to war memorials at the time, literally means "empty tomb".

Australian war memorials are distinctive in that they commemorate not only the dead. Australians were proud that their first great national army, unlike other belligerent armies, was composed entirely of volunteers, men worthy of honour whether or not they made the supreme sacrifice. Many memorials honour all who served from a locality, not just the dead, providing valuable evidence of community involvement in the war. Such evidence is not readily obtainable from military records, or from state or national listings, where names are categorised alphabetically or by military unit.

Australian war memorials are also valuable evidence of imperial and national loyalties, at the time, not seen as conflicting; the skills of local stonemasons, metalworkers and architects; and of popular taste. In Queensland, the digger (soldier) statue was the popular choice of memorial, whereas the obelisk predominated in the southern states, possibly a reflection of Queensland's larger working-class population and a lesser involvement of architects.

Many of the First World War monuments have been updated to record local involvement in later conflicts, and some have fallen victim to unsympathetic re-location and repair.

Although many different memorials were constructed throughout Queensland, the only other known one of this design is the Esk War Memorial. The Charleville memorial is attributed to Ipswich architect George Brockwell Gill due to design similarities with the Esk Memorial, known to be designed by Gill.

George Brockwell Gill was born in England and emigrated to Australia in 1886 and was soon employed by Ipswich architect Samuel Shenton. When Shenton retired in 1889, Gill took over the practice. He designed many substantial buildings in Ipswich including Ipswich Girls' Grammar School and the Ipswich Technical College. He was active in public and church affairs and became president of the Queensland Institute of Architects in 1918. When he retired in 1943, his practice was taken over by Brisbane firm, Conrad and Gargett.

The memorial was constructed in Toowoomba by well-known masonry firm, R C Ziegler and Son and then transported to Charleville. The firm of R C Ziegler and Son was established in Toowoomba in c. 1902 and produced many memorials throughout south western Queensland. The family company moved to Bundaberg, where it was still operating in the mid 1980s.

== Description ==
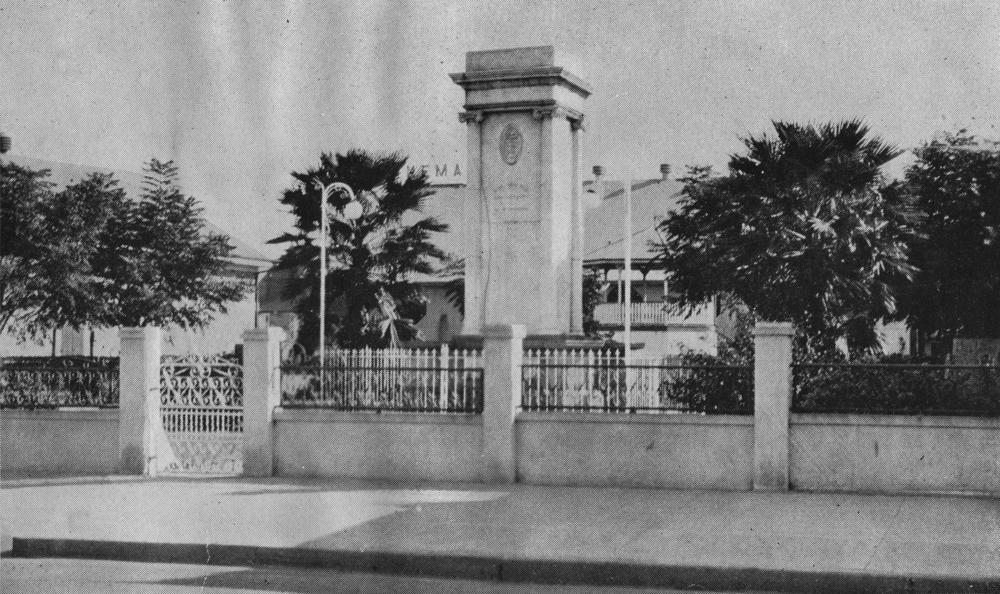
War memorial at Charleville, ca. 1939

The First World War Memorial is situated in a park in Charleville; the park has an ornamental fence and gates and a path leads to the memorial. Also within the park are two guns or war trophies and a flagstaff.

The memorial itself is surrounded by a cast iron picket fence with fleur-de-lis finials and a centrally placed gate.

The Italian marble monument stands 23 feet (7.0 m) from the ground. It sits on a terrazzo base step, the top of which is laid with light and dark tiles in a chequerboard pattern. Above this is the sandstone base of the monument. This is square in plan with corner buttresses and a simply moulded skirting and cornice. The base displays plaques on all faces, commemorating later conflicts, and one earlier one – the Boer War.

Projecting from the centre of the base is a square pillar with engaged columns at each corner. The pillar is of Italian marble and bears leaded names of those who served in the First World War, including the fallen, for whom the front panel is reserved. At the top of each face are carved shields bearing the stylised letters AIF (Australian Imperial Forces). The columns are made in three sections and have Doric order capitals and bases. They support a small cornice, surmounted by a larger cornice and frieze

== Heritage listing ==
Charleville War Memorial was listed on the Queensland Heritage Register on 21 October 1992 having satisfied the following criteria.

The place is important in demonstrating the evolution or pattern of Queensland's history.

War Memorials are important in demonstrating the pattern of Queensland's history as they are representative of a recurrent theme that involved most communities throughout the state. They provide evidence of an era of widespread Australian patriotism and nationalism, particularly during and following the First World War.

The place is important in demonstrating the principal characteristics of a particular class of cultural places.

The monuments manifest a unique documentary record and are demonstrative of popular taste in the inter-war period.

Erected in 1924, the war memorial at Charleville demonstrates the principal characteristics of a commemorative structure erected as an enduring record of a major historical event. This is achieved through the use of appropriate materials and design elements.

The place is important because of its aesthetic significance.

The memorial is of aesthetic significance for its high degree of workmanship, materials and design. Memorials of this type are rare in Queensland. The only other known one of similar design is at Esk.

The place has a strong or special association with a particular community or cultural group for social, cultural or spiritual reasons.

As a memorial representing both the town and district, it has a strong and continuing association with a large part of the community as evidence of the impact of a major historic event and as the focal point for the remembrance of that event.

The place has a special association with the life or work of a particular person, group or organisation of importance in Queensland's history.

It also has special association with architect George Brockwell Gill, and with monumental masonry firm R Ziegler and Sons as an example of their work.
