= Bostock Chambers =

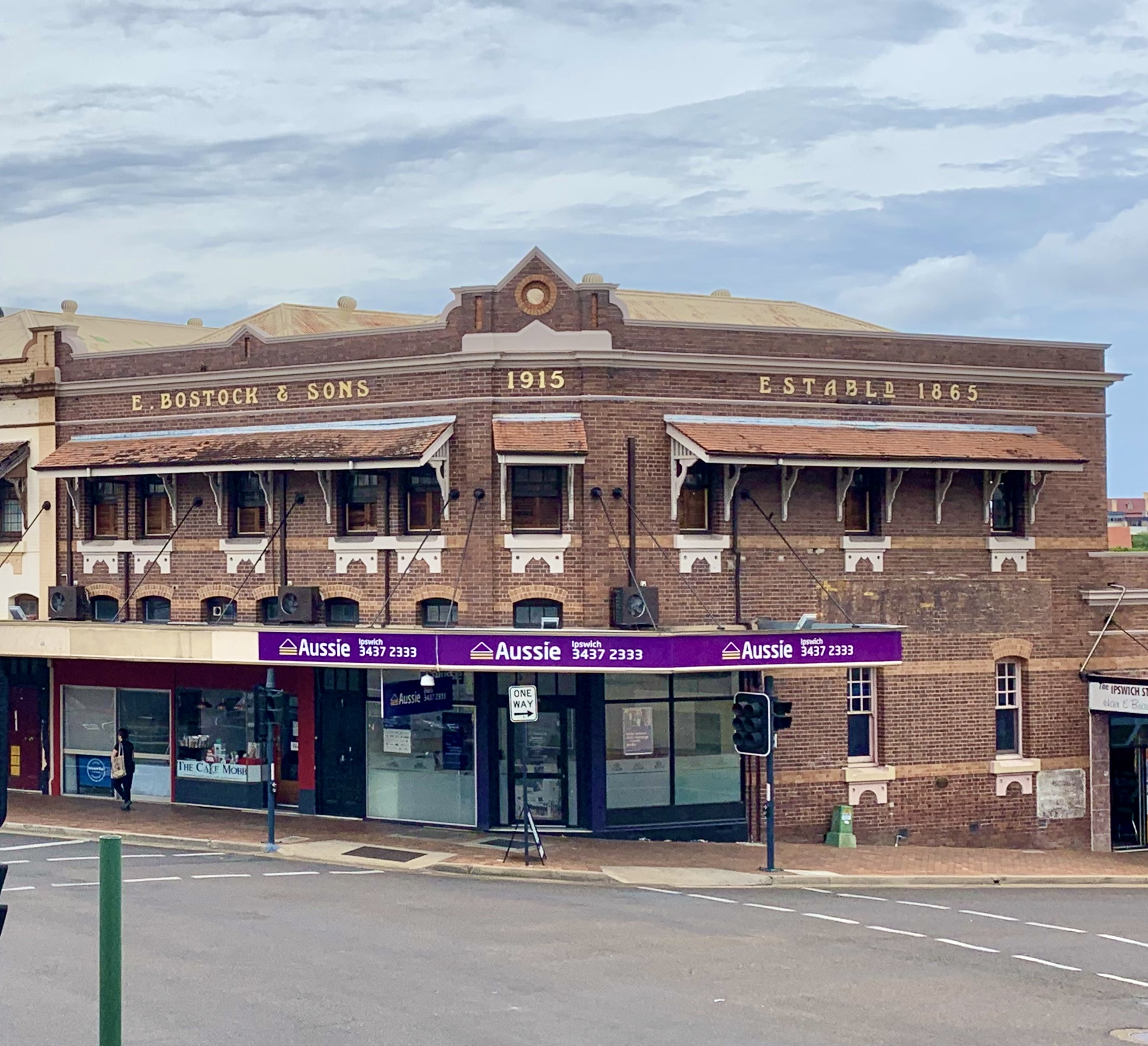
- Building in 2020

- Location within Queensland Location within Australia
- 27.6138°S 152.7578°E
- Location: 169–175 Brisbane Street, Ipswich, City of Ipswich, Queensland, Australia

History
- Design period: 1900–1914 (early 20th century)
- Built: 1915
- Built for: E. Bostock & Sons

Site notes
- Architect: George Brockwell Gill

Queensland Heritage Register
- Official name: Bostock Chambers
- Type: state heritage (built)
- Designated: 21 October 1992
- Reference no.: 600563
- Significant period: 1910s (fabric); 1915–ongoing (historical use)
- Significant components: toilet block/earth closet/water closet, strong room

Bostock Chambers is a heritage-listed office building at 169–175 Brisbane Street, Ipswich, City of Ipswich, Queensland, Australia. It was designed by George Brockwell Gill and built in 1915. It was added to the Queensland Heritage Register on 21 October 1992.

== History ==
The Bostock Chambers building on the corner of Brisbane and Ellenborough Streets was constructed in 1915 for the family business of E. Bostock & Sons, a prominent and well established surveyors and auctioneers in Ipswich. The building was erected at a time of renewed building activity in Ipswich at the beginning of the 20th century and is reflective of this boom.

Enoch Bostock had been a prominent member of the Ipswich community from the mid 19th century and created his own successful surveying, auctioneering and real estate business. Bostock established his first business premises in the former Queensland National Bank building on the corner of Brisbane & East Streets in 1878, later moving to premises in Nicholas Street as E Bostock and Sons. Enoch Bostock died on 9 April 1905 after which his sons continued the family business in Ipswich.

In 1914 the land on the corner of Ellenborough and Brisbane Streets was transferred to Henry Alexander Bostock and Frederick Rowland Bostock, Surveyors, and a mortgage was taken out for £2,000. A tender notice was advertised in The Queensland Times by prominent Ipswich architect George Brockwell Gill (a former associate of Enoch Bostock) on 26 September 1914 and the tender was accepted on 13 October 1914. Bostock Chambers opened in July 1915 and was featured in The Queensland Times of 8 July 1915.

The architect, George Brockwell Gill, designed many of the grand residences and public buildings in Ipswich from the 1880s to the 1930s. Some of his works include "Brynhyfryd" for Lewis Thomas (1889/90), Ipswich Girls' Grammar School (1890/91), St Paul's Rectory (1895), The Ipswich Club (1916), the Hotel Metropole (1906), and supervision of the construction of the Walter Burley Griffin Incinerator in 1936. Gill emigrated from London and settled in Ipswich in 1886 where he commenced work as an architect for the firm of Samuel Shenton. Gill took over Shenton's practice in 1889 when Shenton retired. Gill had been elected Associate of the Queensland Institute of Architects in 1904 and Fellow by 1913. He was its vice-president from 1914 to 1916 and president from 1918 to 1919. George Brockwell Gill's work has made a significant impact on the physical environment of Ipswich, his buildings forming a substantial proportion of the building stock in the CBD and in the suburban streets.

Bostock Chambers has been used as offices and retail outlets from its beginnings and remains as one of the most prominent commercial corner buildings in the Ipswich CBD.

== Description ==
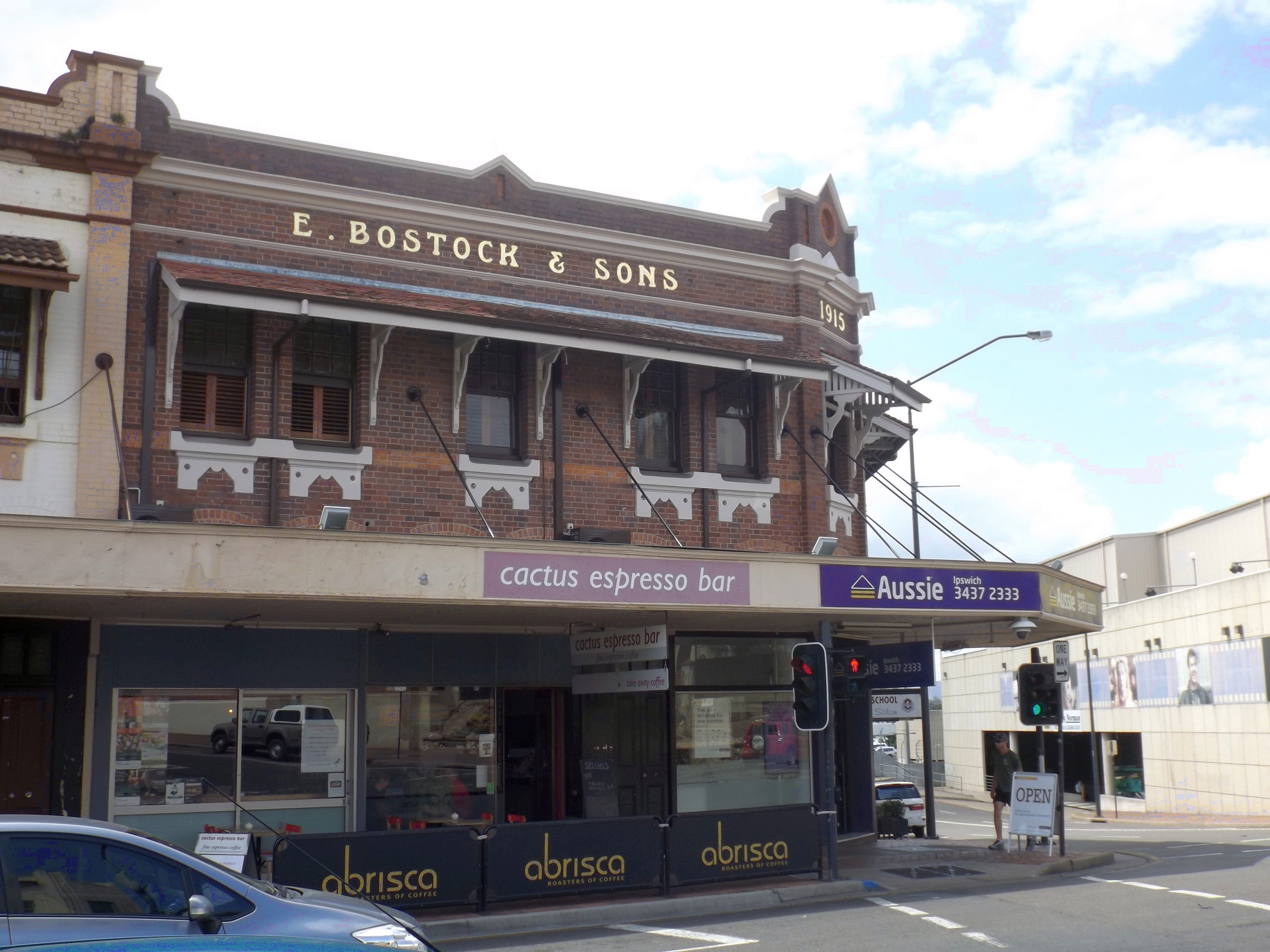
View from opposite side of Brisbane Street, 2015

Bostock Chambers is an intricately detailed, two storey commercial building on the intersection of Brisbane and Ellenborough streets. It is complemented by adjacent buildings which form a coherent streetscape to Brisbane street. The neighbouring building, Colthup Chambers, was constructed as a separate structure and has almost identical detailing.

Bostock Chambers contains shops on the ground floor with offices on the first floor that are accessed via a stair from Brisbane street. It is constructed of face brick with rendered mouldings to the upper facade and parapet. The hipped roofline is concealed behind the parapet which contains the words "E. Bostock & Sons, estabd 1865" with the date of construction of the building, "1915", on the corner. The detailing to the upper floor windows is a distinctive feature of the building and includes elaborate rendered sills, and window hoods with timber brackets, fretwork and terracotta roof tiles. Each double-hung window has nine panes to the upper sash and a single pane to the lower sash.

The street awning to the lower floor is early, and has a pressed metal ceiling. Flat brick arches above fanlights and earlier openings are visible at the top of the awning. The ground floor shops open onto Brisbane street and are accessed from the rear through a courtyard containing a loading dock. A separate, single-storey building is set at an angle to the main two-storey building and houses a shop which addresses Ellenborough street. This shop contains a safe set low in one wall and a vault with a heavy metal door at the rear. The shops have been refurbished but some original fabric remains including fanlights to the shop doorways, marble thresholds and a pressed metal ceiling to the corner shop. The individual tenancies are separated by timber vj walls. The stair to the upper floor is intact with marble threshold, double timber doors and timber stair and handrail.

The upper floor is divided into separate rooms, formerly offices, which either face the street or the rear courtyard and are accessed from a central passageway. These rooms are now used for storage and an opportunity shop. The timber doors and windows are intact and the walls and ceilings are timber framed and lined with vj boarding. The central passageway opens to an elevated walkway, above the rear courtyard, leading to a toilet block set above the loading bay. These toilets are early but not original, and consist of two ladies' and one gents' divided by a corrugated iron screen. The only handbasin is external and located on the walkway.

== Heritage listing ==
Bostock Chambers was listed on the Queensland Heritage Register on 21 October 1992 having satisfied the following criteria.

The place is important in demonstrating the evolution or pattern of Queensland's history.

The Bostock Chambers buildings is important in demonstrating the evolution of the CBD of Ipswich as a reflection of renewed commercial building activity following the turn of the 20th century.

The place is important because of its aesthetic significance.

The building has high aesthetic value as a prominent corner building in the heart of Ipswich contributing significantly to the streetscape of Brisbane and Ellenborough Streets and to the townscape as a whole. The western end of Brisbane Street is an unusually intact example of an early 20th century shopping centre and commercial district focussed around the street, and the Bostock Chambers building contributes to this particular characteristic significantly.

The place has a special association with the life or work of a particular person, group or organisation of importance in Queensland's history.

The building has special association with the Bostock family being the result of their successful business in Ipswich which commenced operation in the mid 19th century. The building still clearly bears their name. Bostock Chambers also has special association with the work of George Brockwell Gill as a significant example his work which included many significant civic, commercial and domestic buildings in Ipswich.
