= Edmund Gill =

Edmund Gill may refer to:

- Edmund Dwen Gill, Australian scientist
- Edmund Marriner Gill, English landscape painter
