= Ipswich Club House =

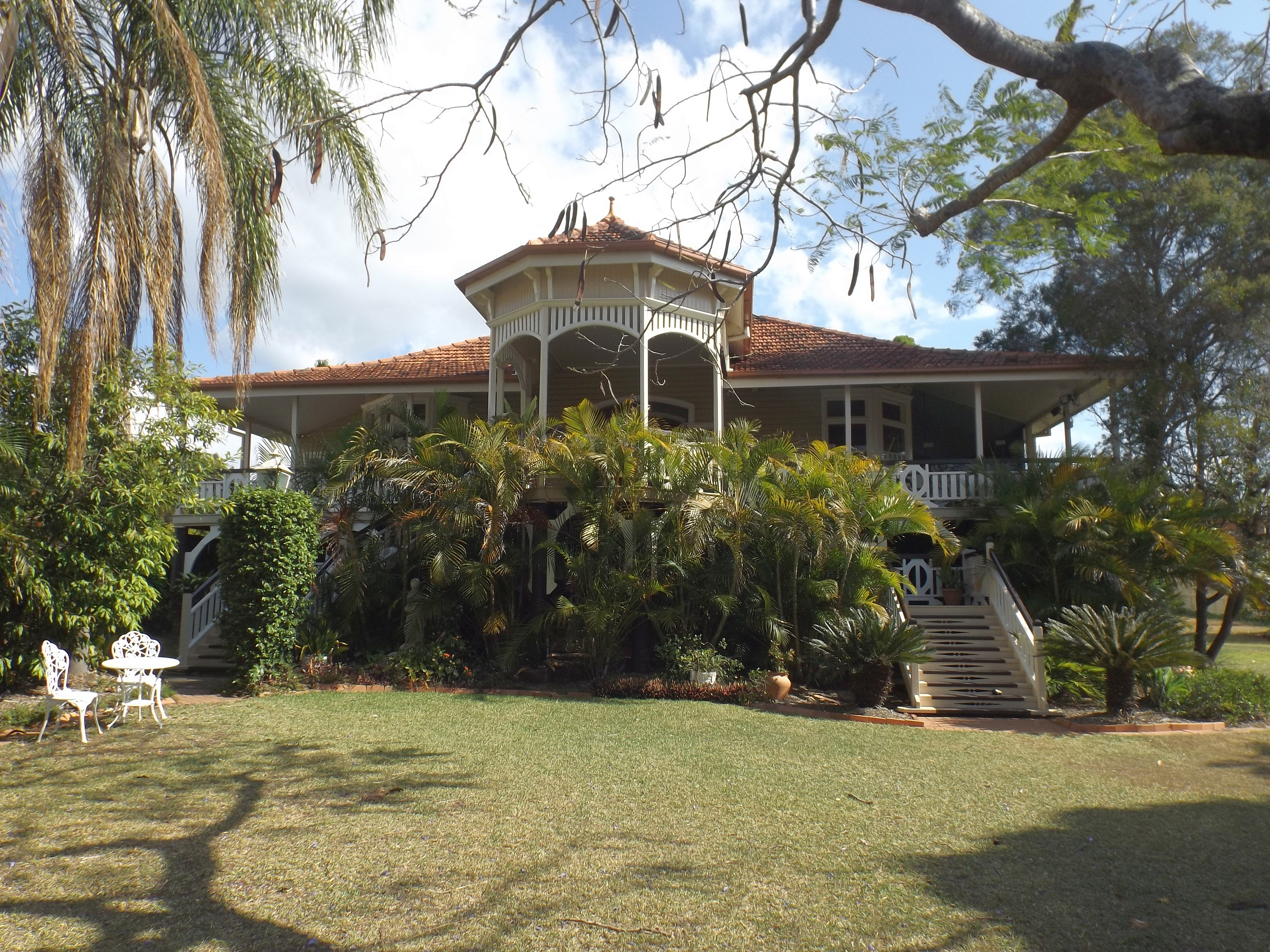
- Front of the building, 2015

- Location within Queensland Location within Australia
- 27.6209°S 152.7619°E
- Location: 14 Gray Street, Ipswich, City of Ipswich, Queensland, Australia

History
- Design period: 1900–1914 (early 20th century)
- Built: c. 1915–1916

Site notes
- Architect: George Brockwell Gill

Queensland Heritage Register
- Official name: Ipswich Club House
- Type: state heritage (built, landscape)
- Designated: 21 August 1992
- Reference no.: 600581
- Significant period: 1910s– (fabric, historical); 1959– (social)
- Significant components: garden/grounds, basement / sub-floor, residential accommodation – main house, staircase/stairs – divided

Ipswich Club House is a heritage-listed villa at 14 Gray Street, Ipswich, City of Ipswich, Queensland, Australia. It was designed by George Brockwell Gill and built from c. 1915 to 1916. It was added to the Queensland Heritage Register on 21 August 1992.

== History ==
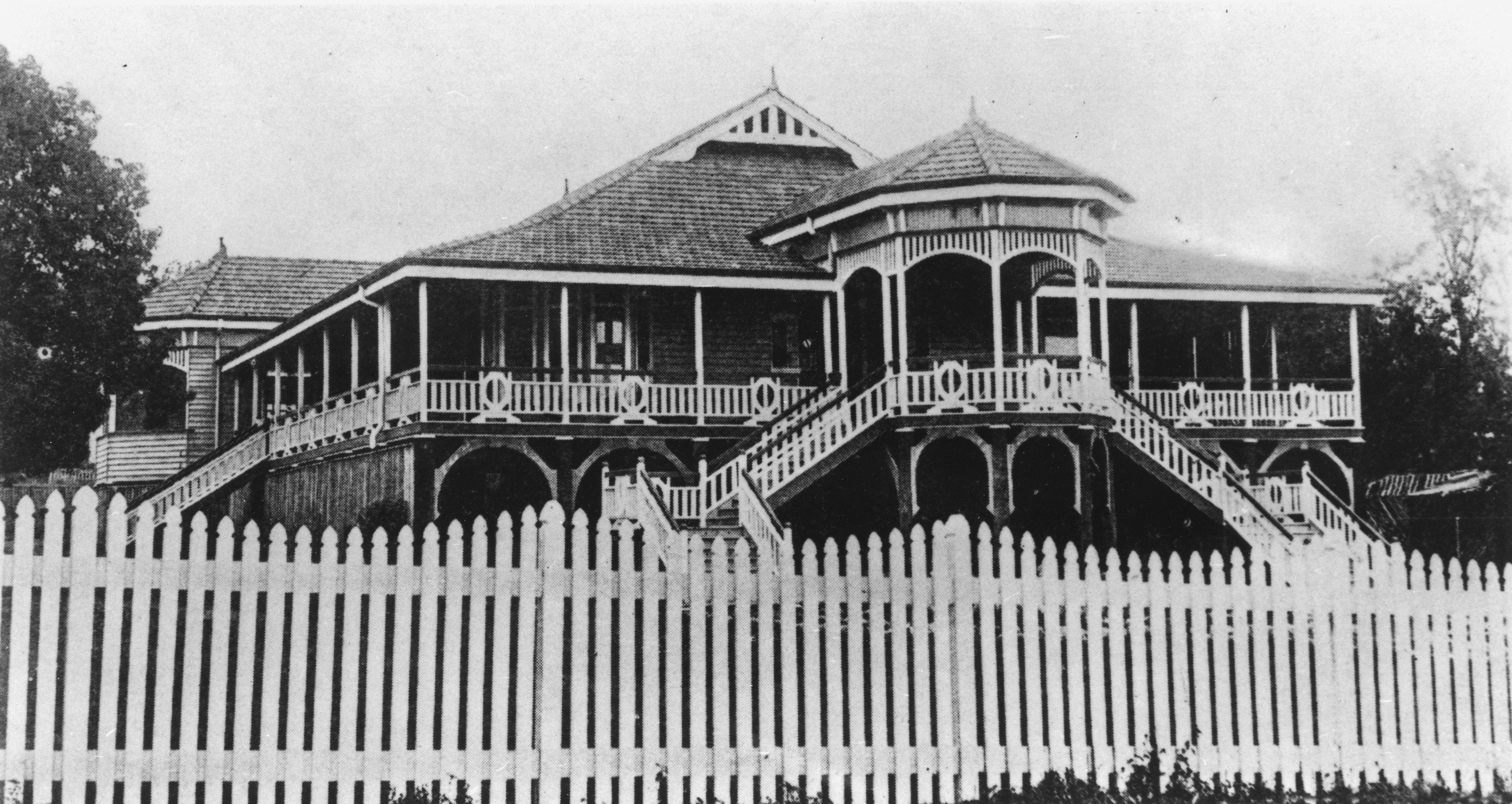
Bottomley residence, 1917

The grand two-storey timber building which is owned and used by The Ipswich Club was built for Ipswich butcher and pastoralist, J.P. Bottomley in 1916. Bottomley commissioned prominent Ipswich architect, George Brockwell Gill, to design the house as a family home named 'Tydfil'. In 1898 Bottomley purchased allotment 16 from the Cramb estate and the adjacent allotment, 15, was purchased in June 1914. The Ipswich City Council water rates book for 1915–16 notes a new house on site from 1 March 1916.

Bottomley was the youngest of 14 children and was born in Bradford, Yorkshire. He came to Australia, arriving in Ipswich in 1884. Initially he worked with Watson Brothers, Butchers, but later he had his own butcher's business and bought pastoral land in the Burnett and western districts. The business he worked for was probably that of Richard Watson and his two brothers. Watson owned the grand residence, "Elamang", at East Ipswich. Bottomley became a high profile Ipswich figure, serving for nine years on the Purga Shire Council, including four years as chairman, and also serving the Ipswich City Council for two years. He was also president of community organisations including the Ipswich Show Society, Ipswich Chamber of Commerce, Queensland Pastoral and Agricultural Society and the Ipswich Bowling Club.

The architect, George Brockwell Gill, designed many of the grand residences and public buildings in Ipswich from the 1880s to the 1930s. Some of his works include "Brynhyfryd" for Lewis Thomas (1889–1890), Ipswich Girls' Grammar School (1890–1891), St Paul's Rectory (1895), Ipswich Technical College (1898–1900) and supervision of the construction of the Walter Burley Griffin Incinerator in 1936. Gill emigrated from London and settled in Ipswich in 1886 where he commenced work as an architect for the firm of Samuel Shenton. Gill took over Shenton's practice in 1889 when Shenton retired. Gill had been elected Associate of the Queensland Institute of Architects in 1904 and Fellow by 1913. He was its Vice-President in 1914–1916 and President in 1918–19. It seems that Gill designed the residence for Bottomley in 1898, when Bottomley purchased the land; however the house was not constructed until 1916.

'Tydfil' remained in the Bottomley family until it was purchased by the Ipswich Club in 1959. The first men's club in Queensland, the North Australian Club, was based in Ipswich, but had ceased to operate during the 1880s. A colonial house in Foote Lane was purchased as premises for the Ipswich Club, which opened in 1949 with Tom Beirne as its first president. The Gray Street house was purchased for the club in 1959 and it officially opened in 1960. In Bottomley's time, the house was used for community social events and continues to be used for that purpose today as the Ipswich Club.

The building has undergone many internal changes since it became the Ipswich Club. Most notably the construction of a bar in the front east wing and the enclosure of the verandah on the front west wing for use as a restaurant. The rear east wing has been extended to the back of the building obscuring the original line of the verandah and creating a large open space for functions. All decorative ceilings have remained intact as well as the joinery in the central hall.

== Description ==
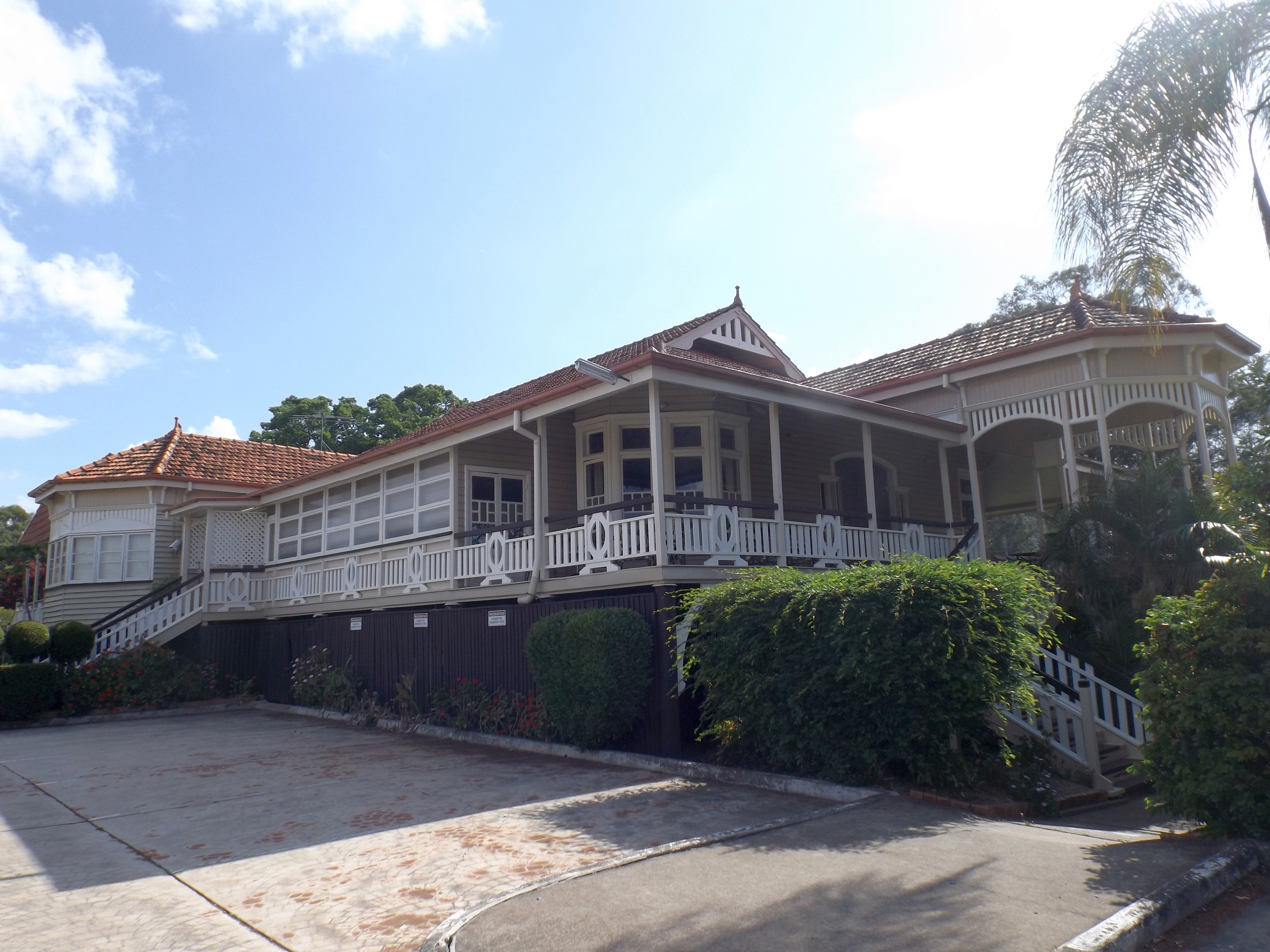
Car park and eastern side of the building, 2015

The Ipswich Club is a substantial, highset timber house, set on timber stumps, and built late in the Federation era. Its street presence is dominated by the structure's northern facade, which features a projecting octagonal porch, set centrally within a double access stair. The octagonal porch or verandah bay is an architectural element which the house has in common with "Bowerbank" and "Arrochar", both of which are also domestic designs by Ipswich architect George Brockwell Gill.

A second faceted porch or verandah bay, on the eastern side of the building, has been partially obscured by additions to the rear of the building. The house has a terracotta tiled roof, which extends over verandahs to three sides, and which features terracotta finials.

A prominent feature of the house is the decorative timber work to the verandahs. The balustrades are wide, white slats, and centrally located in each verandah bay is a circular motif. A scalloped valance is also made from wide, white slats. Dark timber battens enclose the timber stumps supporting the house. An arch of white timber, much like an enlarged verandah bracket, is placed between the stumps supporting the northern, octagonal porch. Such unusual decorative timber features were typical of George Brockwell Gill's domestic work. The house is set back from the street and views of it are framed by mature plantings. It is especially prominent in the view south from Pring Street.

== Heritage listing ==
Ipswich Club House was listed on the Queensland Heritage Register on 21 August 1992 having satisfied the following criteria.

The place is important in demonstrating the evolution or pattern of Queensland's history.

The Ipswich Club building is important in demonstrating the trend of affluent suburban development in Ipswich in the early twentieth century by entrepreneurs who constructed grand residences as status symbols of their wealth and success.

The place is important because of its aesthetic significance.

The former residence has high aesthetic significance for its grand presence on Gray Street marked by fine timber detailing and set in large, established grounds.

The place has a strong or special association with a particular community or cultural group for social, cultural or spiritual reasons.

The club house also has a strong association with the local community for its important role in the city's business and social life as the Ipswich Club.

The place has a special association with the life or work of a particular person, group or organisation of importance in Queensland's history.

The Ipswich Club has a special association with architect George Brockwell Gill as a fine example of his domestic work featuring unusual timber detailing. Gill was responsible for a number of significant civic and domestic designs in Ipswich. This structure is similar to "Arrochar", which has been described as its twin, and "Bowerbank". It also has a strong association with prominent Ipswich citizen, J.P. Bottomley for whom the house was built in 1916.
