= St Paul's Young Men's Club, Ipswich =

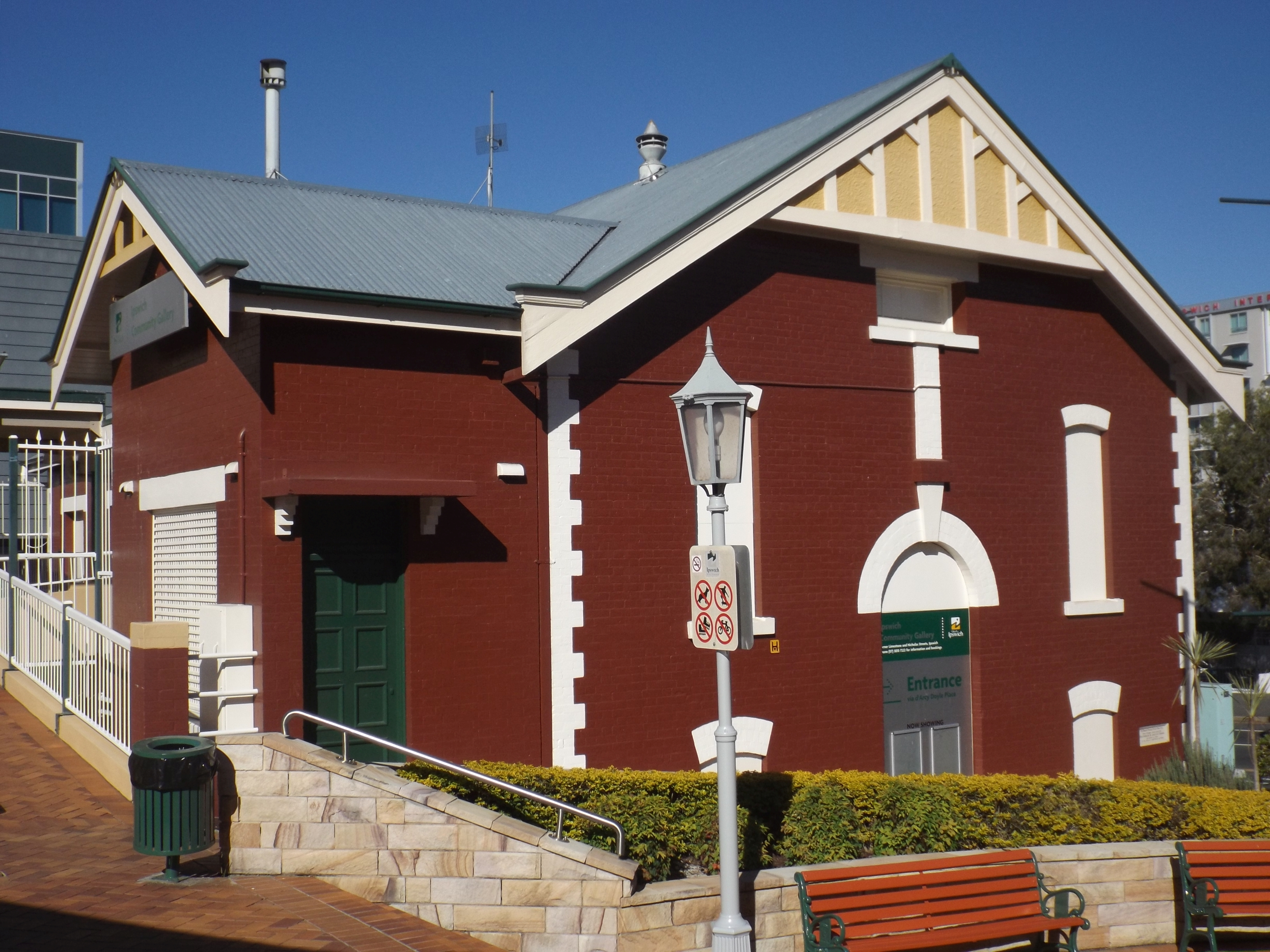
- Building in 2016

- Location within Queensland Location within Australia
- 27.6147°S 152.759°E
- Location: 48 d'Arcy Doyle Place (formerly Nicholas Street), Ipswich, City of Ipswich, Queensland, Australia

History
- Design period: 1900–1914 (early 20th century)
- Built: 1911

Site notes
- Architect: George Brockwell Gill

Queensland Heritage Register
- Official name: St Paul's Young Men's Club – Art Gallery, Ipswich Regional Art Gallery, St Paul's Young Men's Society Hall
- Type: state heritage (built)
- Designated: 21 October 1992
- Reference no.: 600584
- Significant period: 1911 (fabric); 1911–1939, 1939–1975 (historical)

St Paul's Young Men's Club is a heritage-listed former clubhouse and now art gallery at 48 d'Arcy Doyle Place (formerly Nicholas Street), Ipswich, City of Ipswich, Queensland, Australia. It was designed by George Brockwell Gill and built in 1911. It is also known as Ipswich Regional Art Gallery and St Paul's Young Men's Society Hall. It was added to the Queensland Heritage Register on 21 October 1992.

== History ==
St Paul's Young Men's Club is a two-level brick building constructed in 1911 as meeting rooms for St Paul's Young Men's Society. The architect was George Brockwell Gill.

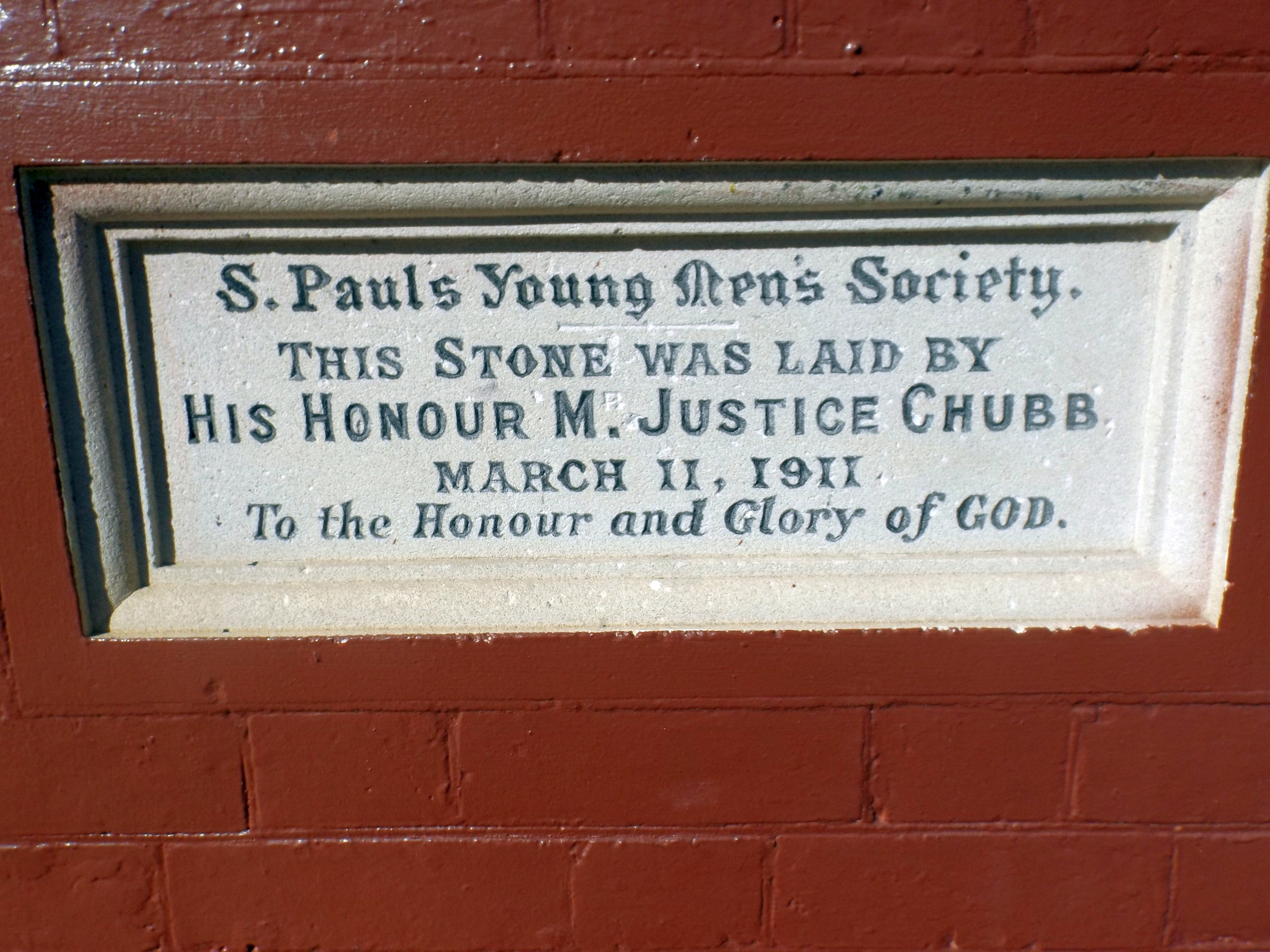
Foundation stone

The construction of a building for the Society was first proposed in 1907 and in September of that year, Lady Chelmsford, wife of the Governor of Queensland, visited Ipswich to open a bazaar to begin fundraising. Plans were prepared by architect George Brockwell Gill in late 1908 and tenders were called, but the lowest tender of £1030 was beyond the Society's capacity. Further fundraising was undertaken and the foundation stone ceremony was finally carried out on Saturday 11 March 1911 by Justice Charles E. Chubb. The building was opened in December 1911 by Archdeacon Arthur Rivers.

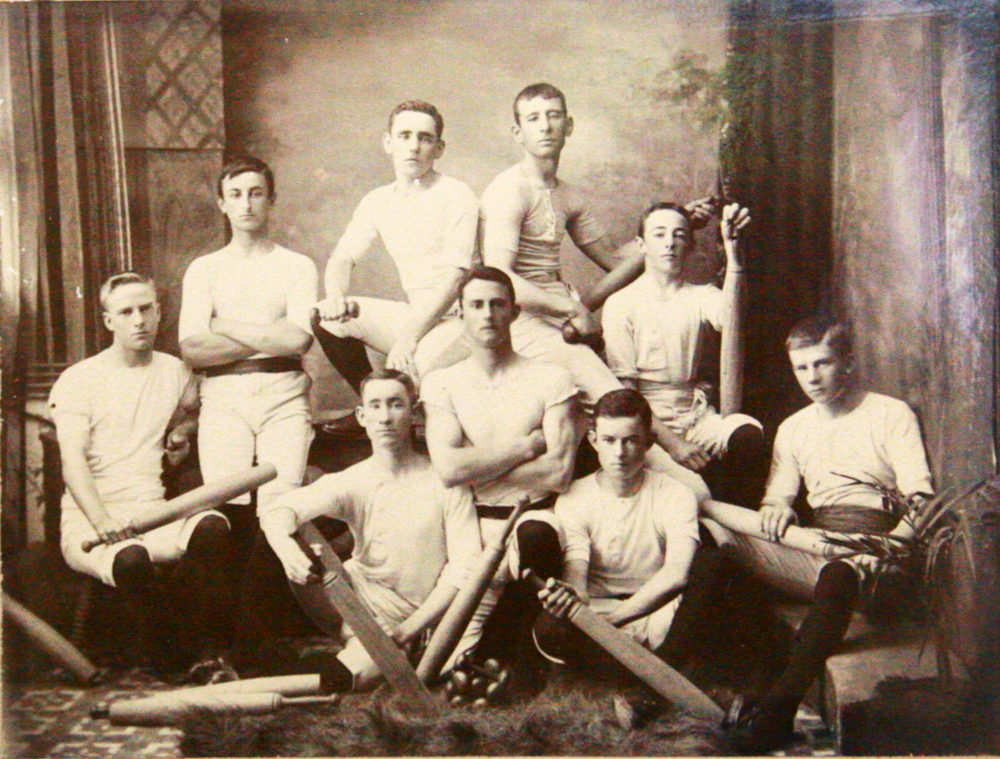
Indian club swinging team, St Paul's Young Men's Club, Ipswich, 1890s

The Society's aims were to promote spiritual, intellectual and physical development and the building included a reading room, gymnasium, bath room, billiard room and piano, all for "wholesome exercises for body and mind". The Society's activities included sport, impromptu speeches and mock parliamentary debates.

During World War I, a Soldiers' Rest Room was proposed for Ipswich and the St Paul's Young Men's Society offered their hall. A patriotic committee composed mainly of local women obtained additional furniture for the hall and also ran the rest room.

In 1938, Ipswich City Council decided to buy the building. The city's need for a new Town Hall and additional Council offices was a recurrent issue in Ipswich over many years and the purchase of the hall was part of a compromise solution. Petitions against the proposal were received but the purchase went ahead in 1939 and the building was used to accommodate Council engineering staff. The glass bricks on the western wall might date from this period but this is uncertain; they were in place by at least the early 1960s.

In 1975, the city library was moved into the building and about the same time, the external brickwork was painted cream to match the new Civic Hall opposite. In the 1980s, the Library was relocated and the building was renovated as Ipswich Regional Art Gallery. Internal modifications included sheeting across windows to provide more hanging space.

At some time, date uncertain, a clerestory or roof vent appears to have been removed. This is suggested by the geometry of timber supports in the ceiling structure.

== Description ==
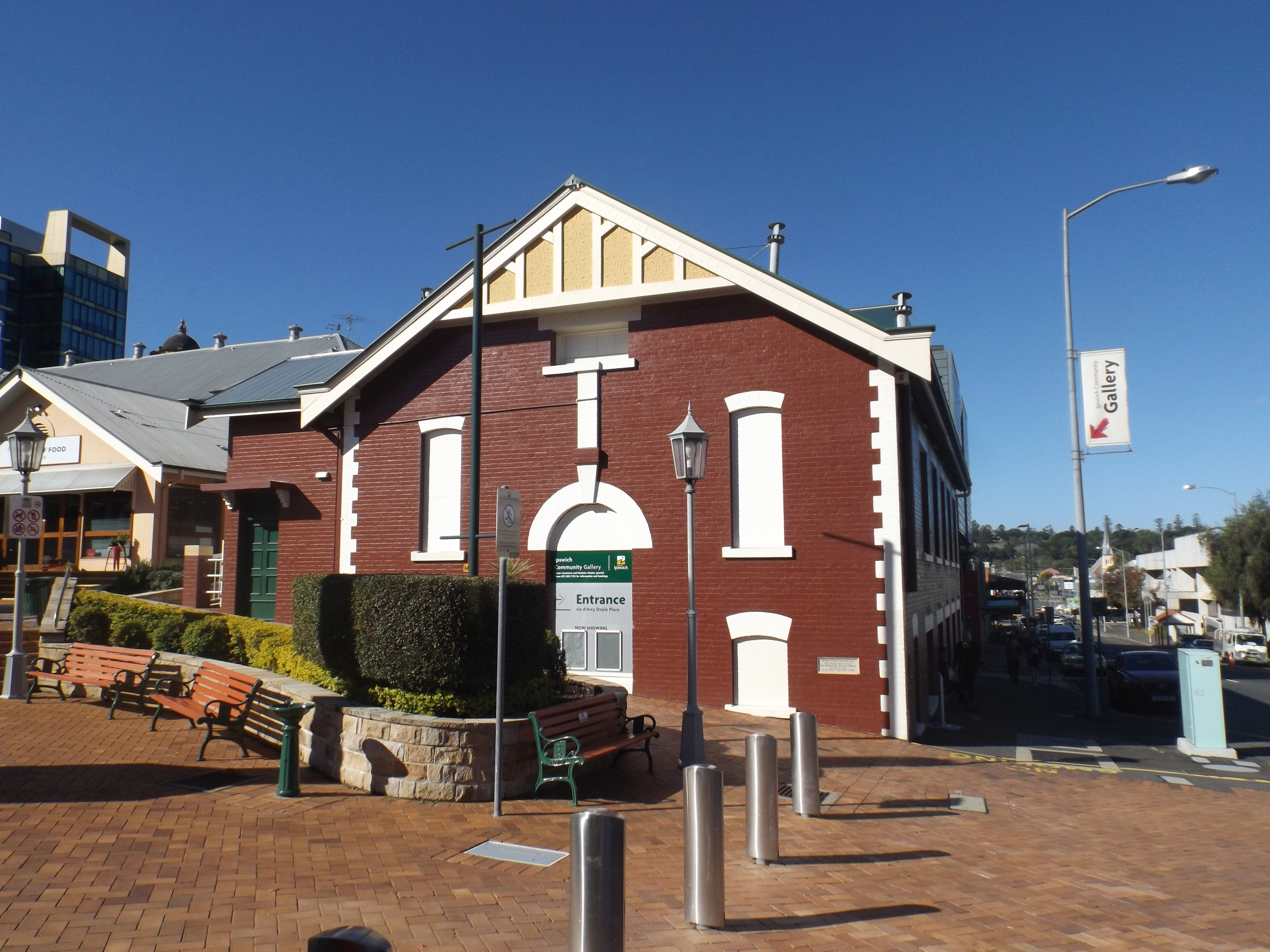
Street view, 2016

The St Paul's Young Men's Hall is a simple two-storeyed load-bearing brick building with a painted exterior finish. The plan form is essentially a simple rectangle with an additional north-facing annexe at the western end. The external walls were originally facebrick in Flemish bond. A sandstone foundation stone is on the western wall at street level. The building is on a steep slope and on the northern side, entry is to the upper floor.

The roof is corrugated galvanised iron with ridge ventilators, narrow eaves and slatted timber infill to gable ends. These details together with the timber multi-paned windows contribute to the building's restrained Federation character.

The windows on both levels of the south street alignment are rectangular while those on the western elevation are arched, flanking a semi-circular headed window with projecting keystone, surmounted by a further horizontal window; most windows on this elevation are now filled with glass bricks.

The interior of the building has a fine upper floor ceiling space with exposed queen-post trusses and a ceiling above lined with tongue and groove boarding.

== Heritage listing ==
St Paul's Young Men's Club - Art Gallery was listed on the Queensland Heritage Register on 21 October 1992 having satisfied the following criteria.

The place is important in demonstrating the evolution or pattern of Queensland's history.

Completed in 1911, the former St Paul's Young Men's Society Hall is important as an example of a purpose-built hall and meeting rooms for a church-based club.

A brick building with restrained Federation detailing, it exhibits aesthetic characteristics valued by the community, particularly as part of a group of civic buildings in the vicinity of the Limestone St/Nicholas Street intersection.

It was closely associated with patriotic groups during World War I when it was used as a soldiers' rest room.

It is also closely associated with the work of Ipswich City Council in providing important cultural services for the community - a library and later an art gallery.

It is a good example of the work of prominent Ipswich architect George Brockwell Gill, showing his skill in designing a small community building on a limited budget.

The place is important in demonstrating the principal characteristics of a particular class of cultural places.

Completed in 1911, the former St Paul's Young Men's Society Hall is important as an example of a purpose-built hall and meeting rooms for a church-based club. It is a good example of the work of prominent Ipswich architect George Brockwell Gill, showing his skill in designing a small community building on a limited budget.

The place is important because of its aesthetic significance.

A brick building with restrained Federation detailing, it exhibits aesthetic characteristics valued by the community, particularly as part of a group of civic buildings in the vicinity of the Limestone St/Nicholas Street intersection.

The place is important in demonstrating a high degree of creative or technical achievement at a particular period.

It is a good example of the work of prominent Ipswich architect George Brockwell Gill, showing his skill in designing a small community building on a limited budget.

The place has a strong or special association with a particular community or cultural group for social, cultural or spiritual reasons.

It was closely associated with patriotic groups during World War I when it was used as a soldiers' rest room. It is also closely associated with the work of Ipswich City Council in providing important cultural services for the community - a library and later an art gallery.
