= Flour Mill, Ipswich =

Former mill in Ipswich, Queensland

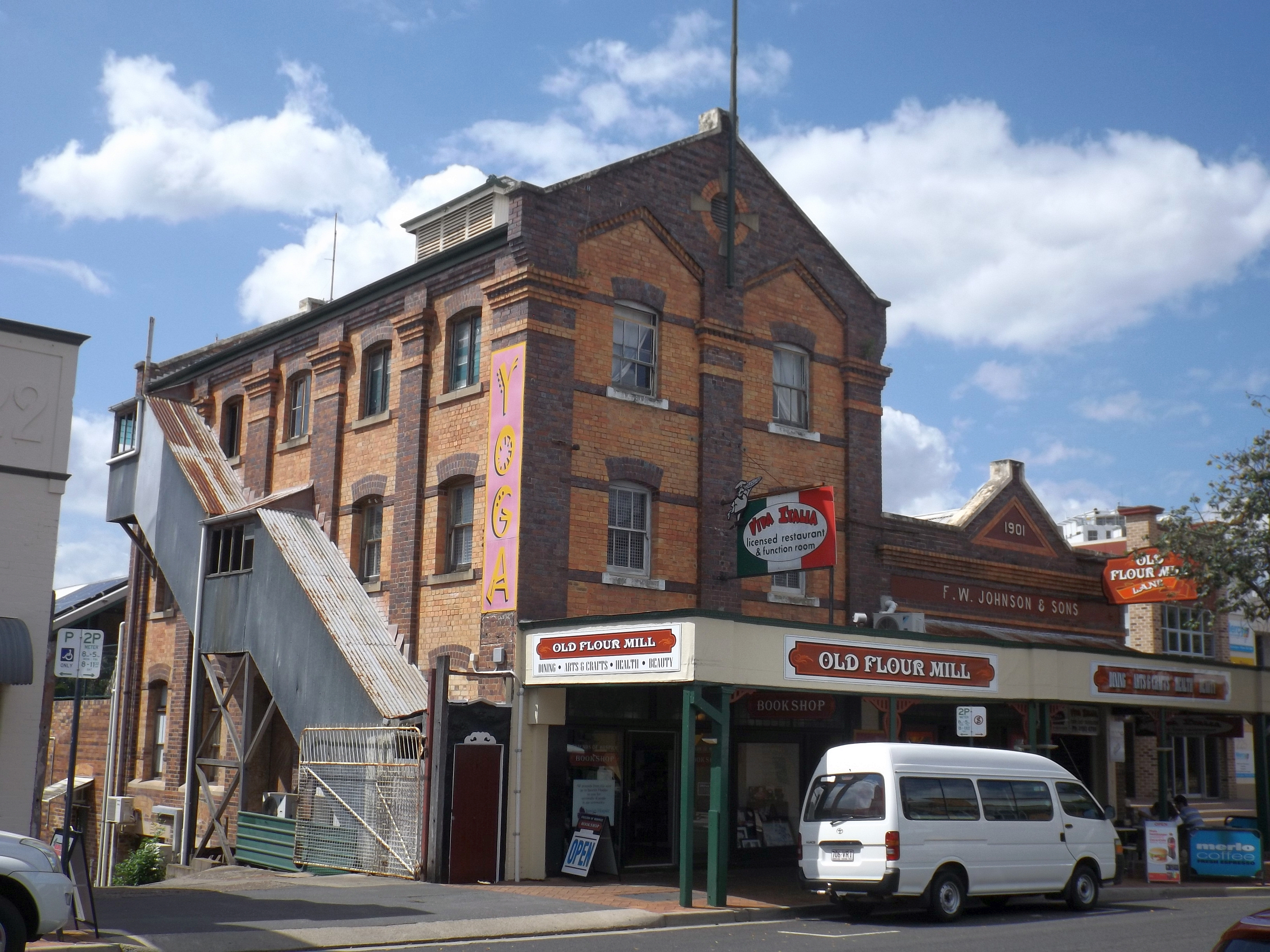
- Building in 2015

- Location within Queensland Location within Australia
- 27.6142°S 152.7555°E
- Location: 231 Brisbane Street, Ipswich, City of Ipswich, Queensland, Australia

History
- Design period: 1900–1914 (early 20th century)
- Built: 1901–1902

Site notes
- Architect: George Brockwell Gill

Queensland Heritage Register
- Official name: Flour Mill, Bridal Mill, F.W. Johnson and Sons Motor Showroom, Old Flour Mill
- Type: state heritage (built)
- Designated: 21 October 1992
- Reference no.: 600556
- Significant period: 1901, 1902, 1910, 1920s, 1993 (fabric); 1902–1910, 1910–1926, 1935 (historical)
- Significant components: store/s / storeroom / storehouse, mill

Flour Mill is a heritage-listed former mill at 231 Brisbane Street, Ipswich, City of Ipswich, Queensland, Australia. It was designed by George Brockwell Gill and built from 1901 to 1902. It is also known as Bridal Mill, F.W. Johnson and Sons Motor Showroom, and Old Flour Mill. It was added to the Queensland Heritage Register on 21 October 1992.

== History ==
The Flour Mill was built in 1901–1902 for the Ipswich Milling Company Ltd, one of a series of flour mills connected with Member of the Queensland Legislative Assembly Francis Kates. The architect was G.B. Gill and the contractors were Worley and Whitehead.

The son of a miller, Kates was born in Berlin and, after graduating from Berlin University, migrated to Queensland in 1858. He settled on the Darling Downs and gradually acquired properties and capital. He built the Allora Flour Mills in 1871. He was elected to the Queensland Legislative Assembly in 1878 and showed interest in the development of the rural sector, presenting a bill in parliament in 1885 for the establishment of an agricultural college in Queensland. He was also aware of Queensland's lack of self-sufficiency in wheat production and was involved in building additional mills, the Ipswich mill said to have been his eighth. Ownership of the property was in the name of his son, Francis Henry Kates.

When first completed in 1902, the main mill building at Ipswich consisted of a basement and three milling floors. The steam engine for the mill was imported from America; the boiler was "colonial" and used North Ipswich coal. In a c. 1935 photo, the skillion-roofed brick extension at basement level at the rear can be seen with two flues projecting through the roof. This extension is not mentioned in early descriptions but was probably the boiler room.

Also at the rear was a large corrugated galvanised iron and timber shed for grain storage, connected to a railway siding; the grain arrived in bags, not as bulk grain. The mill was capable of producing 35–40 long tons (36–41 t) of flour each week, marketed under the brand name "Snowcloud". Attached to the eastern side of the main building was a single storey section, used as a flour store.

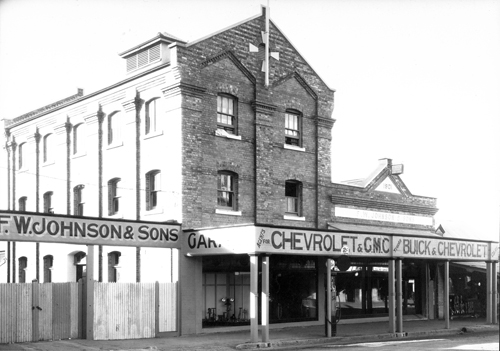
F. W. Johnson & Sons City Motor Works, Ipswich, ca. 1930

Although the main grain supply was from Allora and other places on the Darling Downs, the company urged local farmers to grow wheat and offered to supply seed at cost price, apparently hoping to save transport costs.

Kates died in 1903, but the Ipswich property continued in the ownership of his son. In 1905, a photograph of the mill appeared in an advertisement for "Wigfull and Bland, Ipswich Flour Mills" using a brand name "Heatherbell"; it is not known under what arrangement this change of brand occurred.

In May 1910, Cribb and Foote bought the property for less than the mill's construction cost, using it to accommodate several departments while their new building was being erected. It seems to have then continued in use as the firm's Stove Department. An awning with decorative timber brackets was erected over the footpath in front of the single storey section and a lift was built.

In 1926, the property was bought by the Johnson family and used as a car showroom. In September 1935, radio station 4IP was established in the top floor, entry being via an external staircase on the western side.

An awning was erected across the front of the building, incorporating the earlier Cribb and Foote section of awning; the date is not certain but was probably in the late 1920s as work appears to be in progress in a 1927 photograph.

Later uses of the mill included housing Paddy's Market and storing furniture. In the mid-1980s, the upper floor was used for a martial arts school and the lower floors became a bridal shop and fabric shop.

In 1985, the property was purchased by Beverley de Witt and it was converted into a restaurant, function room and shopping arcade in 1993. An additional two-storey wing was built at the rear of the mill section to house the function room.

== Description ==
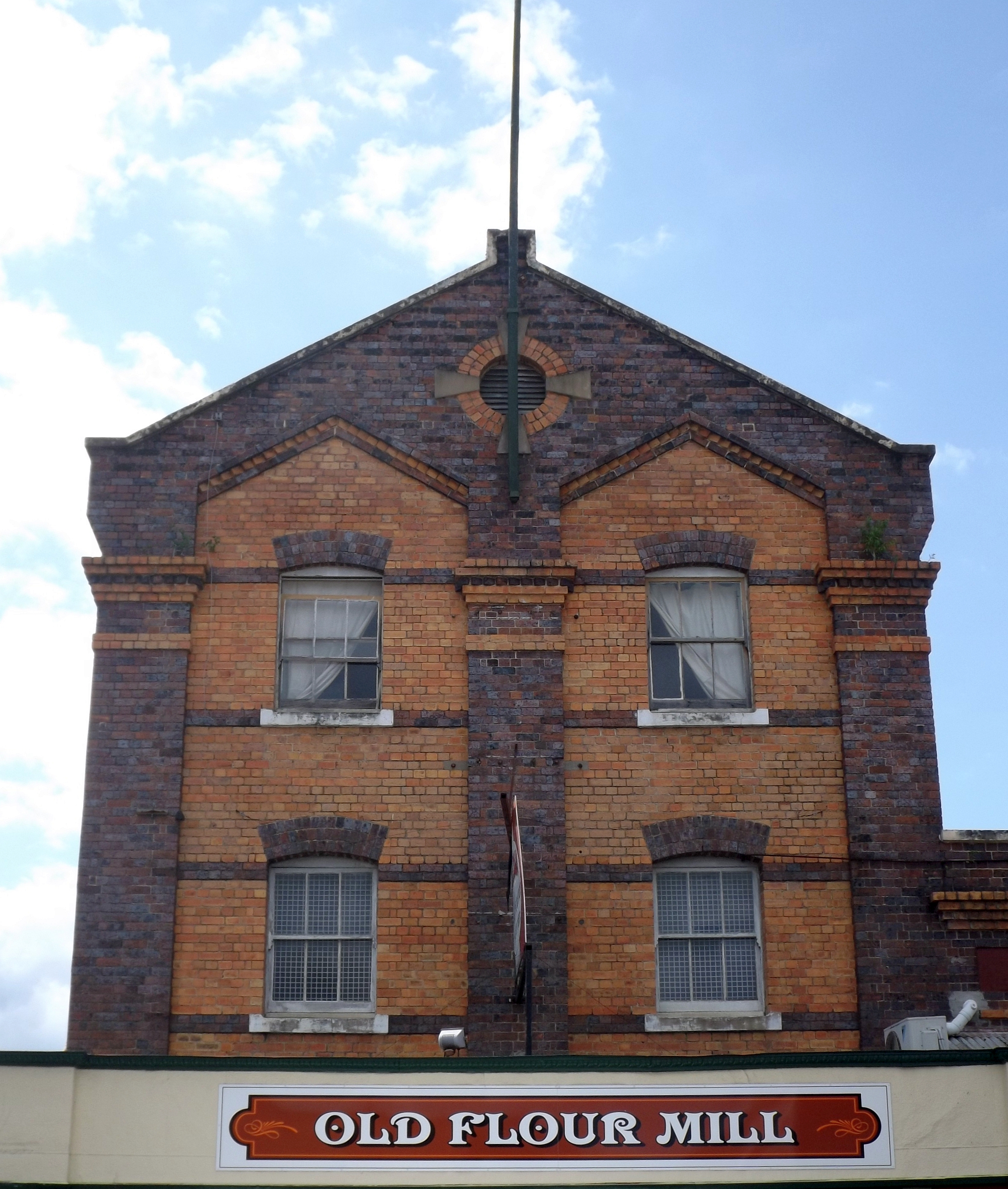
Upper floors, 2015

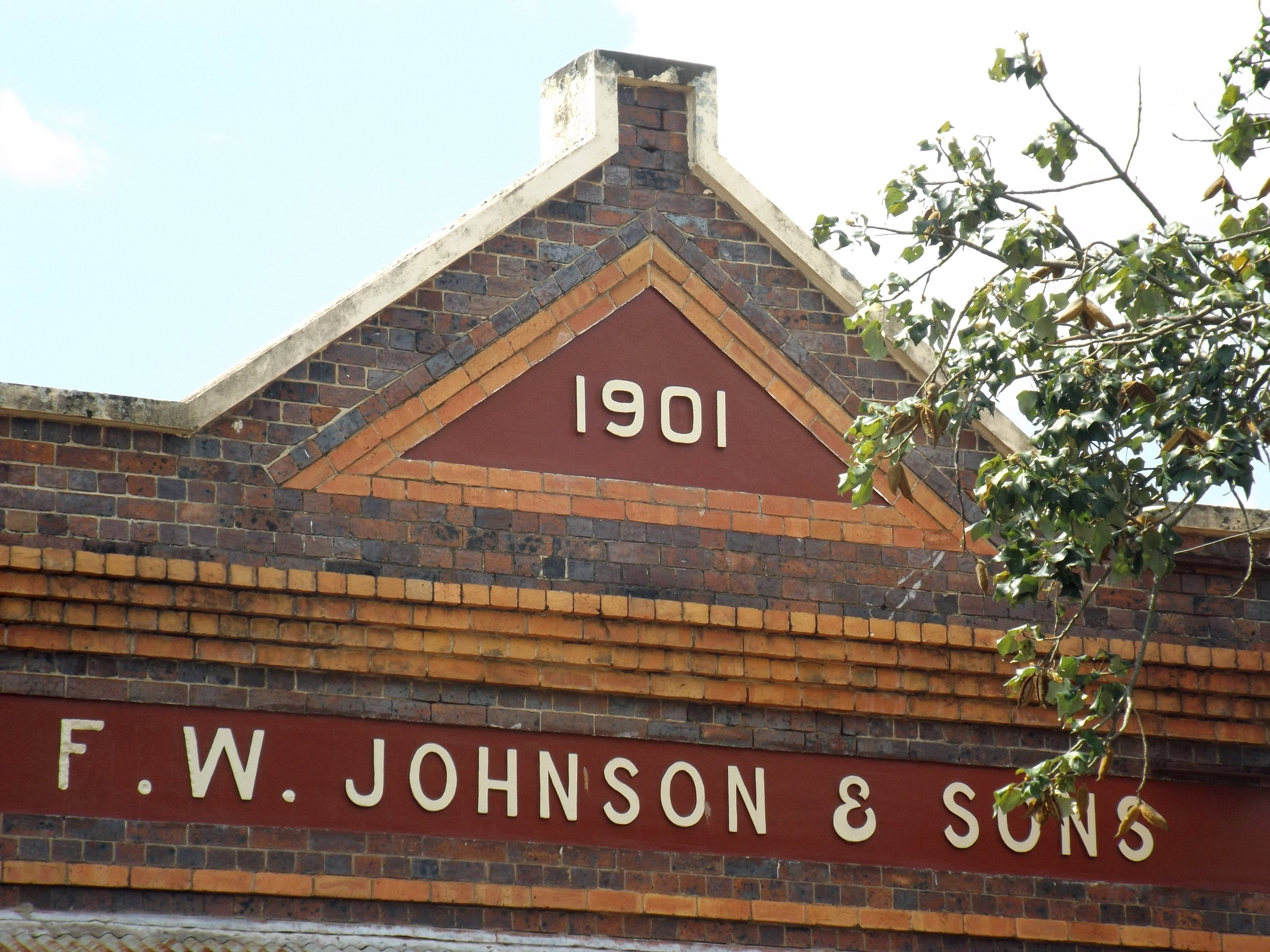
Parapet

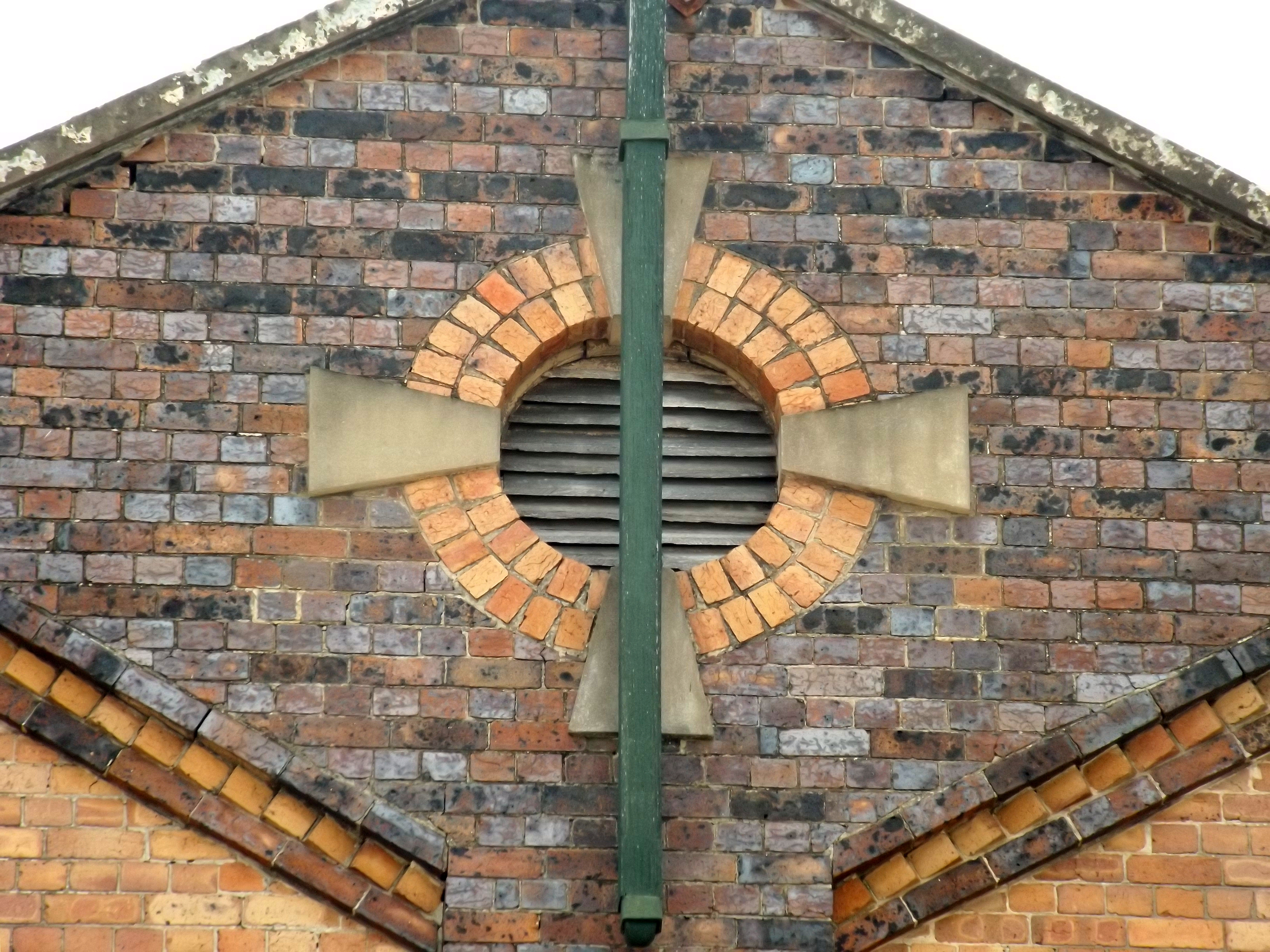
Timber ventilator

The Flour Mill is a complex of attached buildings. The main (former milling) section consist of three floors plus a basement; because of the steep slope, the basement is above ground level at the rear. The mill section is built of load-bearing polychrome brickwork, ornamented with pilasters, arches and string courses. There are pairs of windows on the upper two levels at the front and five windows on each level on the sides. The roof is corrugated galvanised iron with a raised louvred timber ventilator. The basement level extends at the rear and now has an outdoor eating area on top; the brickwork has been built up to form a flat floor for the eating area, but the line of the original skillion roof is still detectable.

The shopfront corresponding to the former mill contains a retail shop on the ground and first floor, with internal stairs connecting the two levels. The third floor of the mill is accessed by an external stair enclosed in corrugated galvanised iron.

At the rear of the original mill is a recently constructed wing with a brick base and corrugated galvanised iron-clad upper level, now containing a function room.

Attached to the eastern side of the mill is a single storey section (the former flour store) with an ornamental parapet bearing the date 1901. Behind this is the former corrugated galvanised iron-clad grain store. The single storey section contains a sandwich shop on the left and a passageway on the right leading to stairs which give access to the former grain store; one set of stairs leads up to a restaurant while the other leads down to a shopping arcade.

A street awning runs across the front of the entire building. The ceiling of the right-hand section of awning is pressed metal; the ceiling of the left-hand section is ripple iron. Above both shop-fronts are coloured glass fanlights.

The Old Flour Mill is an icon building within the CBD or 'Top of Town' precinct of the City of Ipswich. The property is an amalgamation of two lots with four-levels which was extended to include the rear mezzanine restaurant and basement arcade during the buildings 1993 upgrade. However, since 2020 the number of shops has increased from 14 to 19 since the recent renovations to the Old Flour Mill.

== Heritage listing ==
Flour Mill was listed on the Queensland Heritage Register on 21 October 1992 having satisfied the following criteria.

The place demonstrates rare, uncommon or endangered aspects of Queensland's cultural heritage.

Completed in early 1902, the mill is an unusual example of an industrial building constructed in a city CBD.

The place is important because of its aesthetic significance.

Although designed to carry out a basic industrial process, the flour mill is carefully detailed and ornamented and is important in exhibiting aesthetic characteristics valued by the community. It is part of the historic shopping precinct known as "Top of Town" and makes an important contribution to the streetscape.

The place has a special association with the life or work of a particular person, group or organisation of importance in Queensland's history.

The flour mill is associated with politician Francis Kates and his son Francis Henry Kates, and with the development of the family's milling enterprises.

The mill is associated with the important early retailer Cribb and Foote as their stove department; and with the early radio station 4IP which opened in 1935.

The place has special association with architect George Brockwell Gill as an example of his well-detailed brick commercial buildings.
