= City View Hotel =

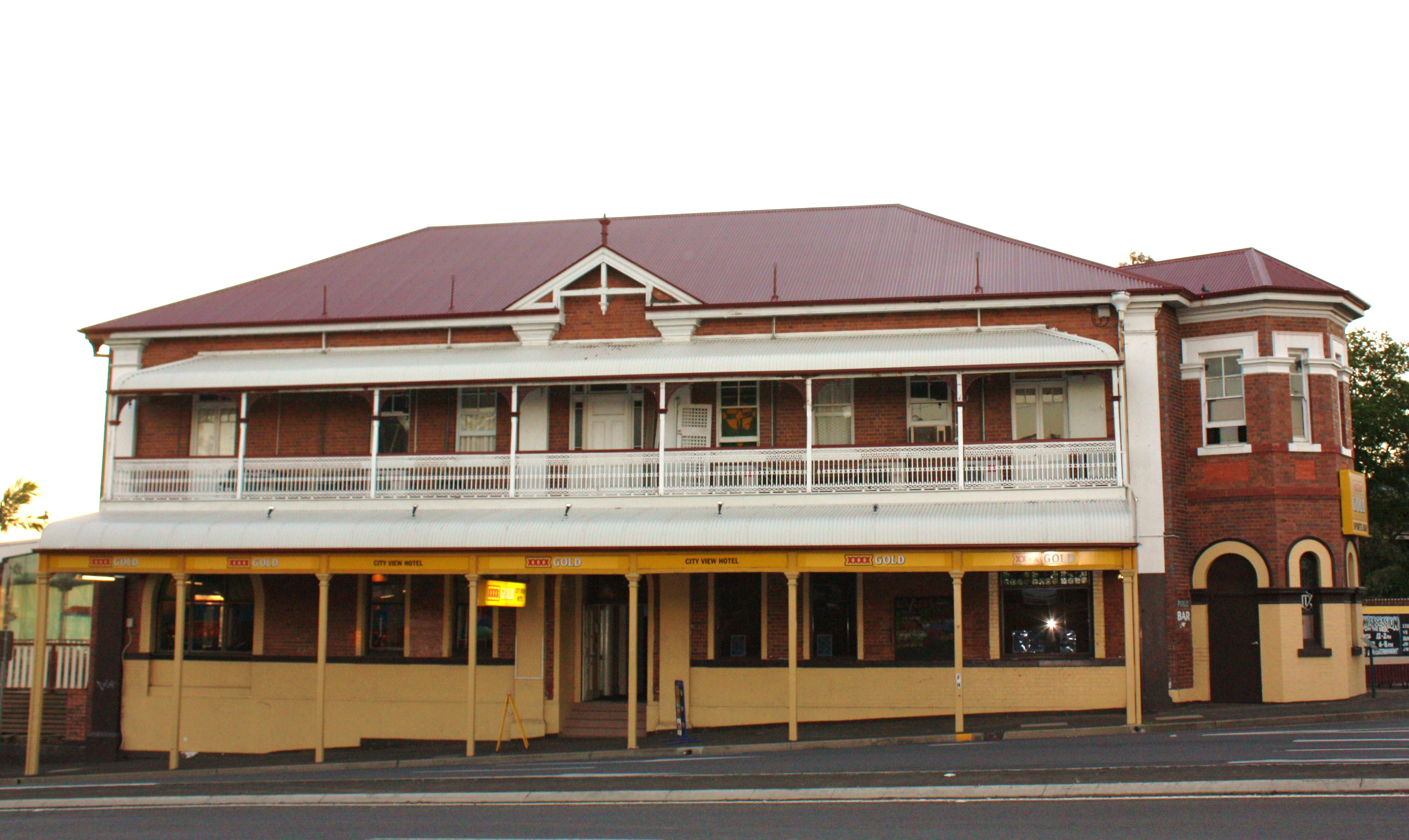
- Front of building, 2009

- Location within Queensland Location within Australia
- 27.6155°S 152.7512°E
- Location: 277 Brisbane Street, Ipswich, City of Ipswich, Queensland, Australia

History
- Design period: 1900–1914 (early 20th century)
- Built: c. 1908

Site notes
- Architect: George Brockwell Gill

Queensland Heritage Register
- Official name: City View Hotel
- Type: state heritage (built)
- Designated: 21 October 1992
- Reference no.: 600557
- Significant period: 1900s (fabric) c. 1908–ongoing (historical use)
- Significant components: lead light/s, tower, toilet block/earth closet/water closet, residential accommodation – manager's house/quarters

City View Hotel is a heritage-listed hotel at 277 Brisbane Street, Ipswich, City of Ipswich, Queensland, Australia. It was designed by George Brockwell Gill and built c. 1908. It was added to the Queensland Heritage Register on 21 October 1992.

== History ==
The City View Hotel is a two-storey brick building, believed to have been completed in 1908. The architect was George Brockwell Gill. The site was a difficult triangular one adjoining a deep railway cutting excavated in 1875. Gill produced a skilful solution to the problem, locating an octagonal two-storey "tower" or bay on the apex to disguise the sharp truncation of the building, while the front facade presents as a traditional two-storey verandahed hotel. The hotel was built for T. Humphreys, and the first manager was H. Hutting. The name refers to the hotel's position on the edge of the Ipswich CBD. In the 1980s, some of the brickwork was painted and a beer garden structure was erected on the western end. A two-storeyed brick bathroom and toilet annexe was built in the rear courtyard sometime between 1960 and 1980.

In December 2014, the hotel closed its public bar, citing falling patronage due to drink driving laws, anti-smoking legislation and hard economic times. However, the hotel continues to operate its accommodation and function businesses and might open a restaurant.

== Description ==
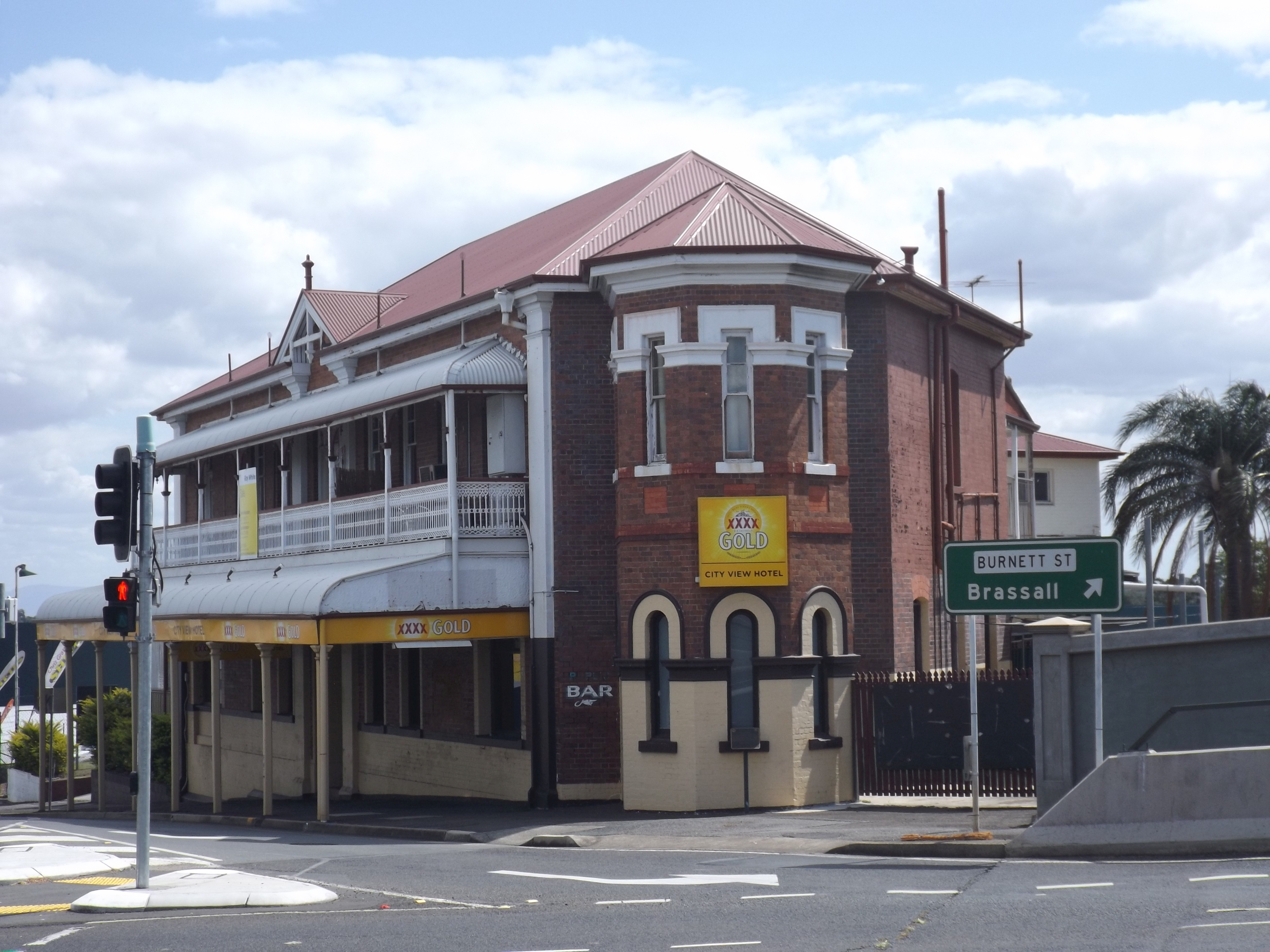
Building in 2015

The hotel is a two-storeyed brick building with a corrugated galvanised iron hipped roof. On the eastern end is an attached two-storey octagonal tower with ground-level porch. Extensive alterations have been made to the lounge bar to create a "cabaret-style" interior linked through the southern wall to a timber-framed single storey extension. A two-storeyed kitchen-domestics' wing extends at the rear completing the L-shape of the original building.

== Heritage listing ==
City View Hotel was listed on the Queensland Heritage Register on 21 October 1992 having satisfied the following criteria.

The place is important in demonstrating the principal characteristics of a particular class of cultural places.

It demonstrates the principal characteristics of a Federation-era provincial hotel.

The place is important because of its aesthetic significance.

Built c. 1908, the City View Hotel is a well-detailed brick hotel which exhibits aesthetic characteristics valued by the community. It is prominently positioned at a major intersection and has landmark qualities.

The place has a special association with the life or work of a particular person, group or organisation of importance in Queensland's history.

It is the design of an architect George Brockwell Gill and is an example of his well-detailed work.
