= Edmund Marriner Gill =

English painter (1820–1894)

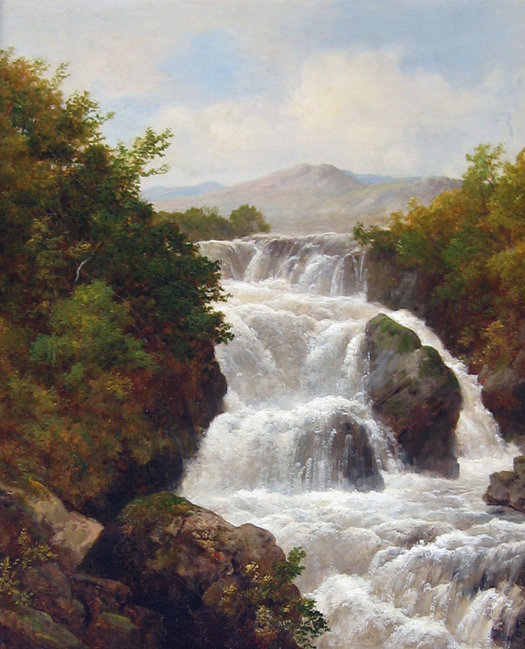
The Waterfall (1889)

Edmund Marriner Gill (1820–1894) was an English landscape painter favouring waterfalls. He was the son of portrait painter Edmund Ward Gill (1794–1854) and brother to painters William Ward Gill (1823–1894) and George Reynolds Gill (1827–1904).

He was a student at the Royal Academy and produced watercolours and oils of the English, Welsh and Scottish countrysides, being much influenced by David Cox after meeting him in Birmingham in 1841.

He exhibited at the Royal Academy between 1842 and 1886, and lived in London, Ludlow and Hereford.
