= George Brockwell Gill =

Australian architect

George Brockwell Gill (1857–1954) was an architect in Ipswich, Queensland, Australia. Many of the buildings he designed are heritage-listed.

== Early life ==
George Brockwell Gill was born in 1857 in the Lambert district of Surrey, England.

== Architectural career ==
Gill emigrated from London and settled in Ipswich in 1886 where he commenced work as an architect for the firm of Samuel Shenton. Gill took over Shenton's practice in 1889 when Shenton retired. Gill had been elected Associate of the Queensland Institute of Architects in 1904 and Fellow by 1913. He was its Vice-President in 1914–16 and President in 1918–19.

Significant works include:

- Baptist Church
- Bostock Chambers
- Charleville War Memorial
- City View Hotel
- Esk War Memorial
- Fairy Knoll
- Ipswich Flour Mill
- Hotel Metropole
- Ipswich Club House
- Ipswich Girls Grammar School
- Ipswich Grammar School
- Marburg Community Centre and First World War Memorial
- Pen Y Llechwedd
- Queen Victoria Silver Jubilee Memorial Technical College
- Soldiers' Memorial Hall
- St Paul's Young Men's Club
- St Pauls' Anglican Church and Rectory (1929 western extension and 1895 rectory)
- Uniting Church Central Memorial Hall
- Woodlands

== Later life ==
George Gill retired to Coolangatta in 1942, where he surfed every morning until about 1951. Aged 97 years, he died at his home at Rutledge Street, Coolangatta on 1 June 1954 following a short illness, a few days short of his 70th wedding anniversary. He was privately cremated at Mount Thompson Crematorium.
