= George Gill (English footballer) =

English footballer

Personal information
- Full name: George Arthur Gill
- Date of birth: 1894
- Place of birth: Heaton, England
- Height: 6 ft 0 in (1.83 m)
- Position: Goalkeeper

Senior career*
Years	Team	Apps	(Gls)
1911–1912	Newcastle City		
1912–1913	Kelloe St Helen's		
1913–1924	Hartlepools United	196	(0)
c. 1924	South Durham Steel & Ironworks		
- * Club domestic league appearances and goals

George Arthur Gill was an English professional footballer who made 196 appearances as a goalkeeper in the Football League and the North Eastern League for Hartlepools United.

== Personal life ==
Gill served at home in the Tyne Electrical Engineers during the First World War.

== Career statistics ==
Appearances and goals by club, season and competition
Club	Season	League			FA Cup		Total	
Club	Season	Division	Apps	Goals	Apps	Goals	Apps	Goals
Hartlepools United	1913–14	North Eastern League	38	0	6	0	44	0
Hartlepools United	1914–15	North Eastern League	38	0	2	0	40	0
Hartlepools United	1919–20	North Eastern League	20	0	1	0	21	0
Hartlepools United	1920–21	North Eastern League	35	0	7	0	42	0
Hartlepools United	1921–22	Third Division North	32	0	1	0	33	0
Hartlepools United	1922–23	Third Division North	11	0	0	0	11	0
Hartlepools United	1923–24	Third Division North	22	0	0	0	22	0
Career total			196	0	17	0	213	0
