= Esk War Memorial =

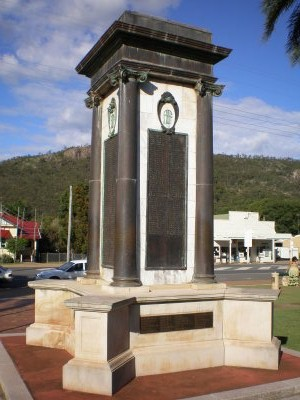
- Esk War Memorial, 2010

- Location within Queensland Location within Australia
- 27.2401°S 152.4212°E
- Location: Ipswich Street, Esk, Somerset Region, Queensland, Australia

History
- Design period: 1919–1930s (interwar period)
- Built: 1920–1991

Site notes
- Architect: George Brockwell Gill

Queensland Heritage Register
- Official name: Esk War Memorial and Esk Memorial Park
- Type: state heritage (built)
- Designated: 21 October 1992
- Reference no.: 600494
- Significant period: 1921– (social); 1921–1991 (historical, fabric – memorials); 1979–1985 (fabric – park)
- Significant components: memorial – other, memorial/monument, park/green space
- Builders: Frank Williams & Co

Esk War Memorial is a heritage-listed memorial at Ipswich Street, Esk, Somerset Region, Queensland, Australia. It was designed by George Brockwell Gill and built in 1920 by Frank Williams & Co. It is also known as Esk Memorial Park. It was added to the Queensland Heritage Register on 21 October 1992.

== History ==
Esk Memorial Park was proclaimed a reserve for memorial purposes in 1979, but a First World War memorial has stood on the site, at the intersection of Highland and Ipswich Streets, since 1921.

The memorial was commissioned by the Esk Patriotic Committee on behalf of the Shire of Esk. Subscriptions commenced in 1916, and tenders were called in April 1919 by prominent Ipswich architect George Brockwell Gill. The foundation stone was laid on 30 November 1920, and the memorial was unveiled on 28 September 1921 by General Lachlan Chisholm Wilson. The masonry work was carried out by the Ipswich firm of Frank Williams & Co., and the art metalwork was supplied by Wunderlich Ltd of Sydney. It cost £885.

This was not the first war memorial in the shire. Colinton had erected an honour board at the local School of Arts building in 1916, and a stone memorial in 1917. The Toogoolawah War Memorial had been unveiled in March 1917.

In 1983 the memorial park was extended, and a stone memorial to Captain Patrick Logan, commandant of the Moreton Bay Penal Settlement who was murdered while exploring the Brisbane Valley in 1830, was erected in the park in 1984. The site was landscaped in 1985.

In 1988 some of the lettering on the First World War memorial was restored, and two plaques commemorating Australian sacrifice in post-1945 conflicts were affixed. In 1991 another plaque was attached, honouring those who fell in the Second World War.

== Description ==
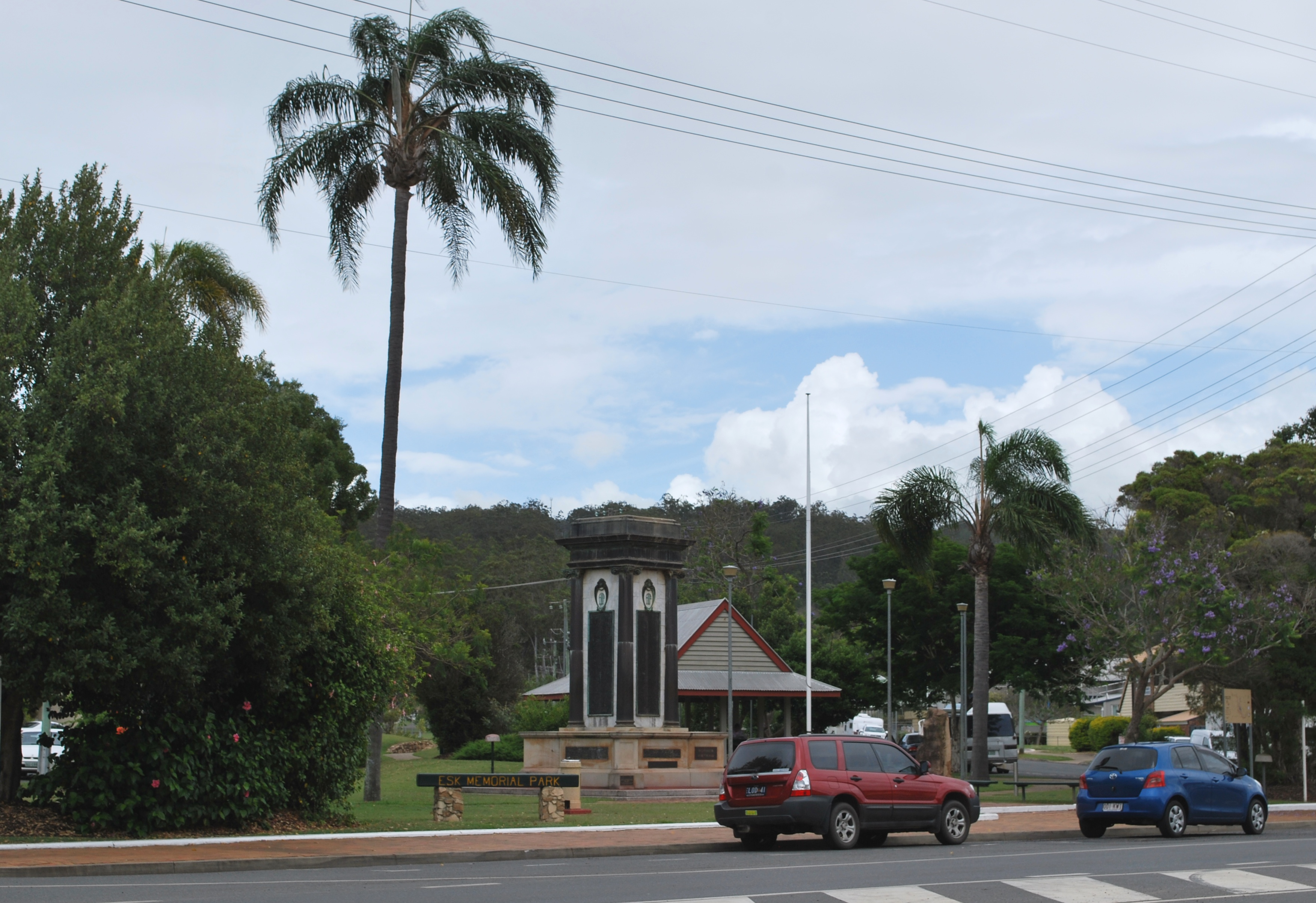
Esk Memorial Park

Esk Memorial Park, which contains two stone monuments and landscaped paths and gardens, is located in the main street of Esk.

The First World War memorial consists of a sandstone plinth with four ionic corner pilasters and an entablature sheeted in bronze. Recessed into each of the four faces is a marble tiled panel with a bronze honour roll of 462 shire residents who enlisted together with the letters AIF and its emblem. The memorial sits on a stepped base of concrete aggregate.

Three bronze honour rolls bearing the names of 83 local men who fell during the First World War are fixed to the side and rear of the plinth. Four commemorative plaques bearing inscriptions 1939 – World War II 1945, 1914 – The Great War – In Honour Of Our Boys – 1919, Korea – Malaya, and Borneo – Vietnam are fixed to the front of the plinth.

Also located within the park is a memorial to Captain Logan. This consists of a single, upright sandstone block. Fixed to the northern face is a bronze plaque bearing an inscription in white lettering.

The park is landscaped with native trees and palms, and includes pathways, a barbecue area, seating and a children's playground.

== Heritage listing ==
Esk War Memorial was listed on the Queensland Heritage Register on 21 October 1992 having satisfied the following criteria.

The place is important in demonstrating the evolution or pattern of Queensland's history.

Esk War Memorial, erected in 1921, is important in demonstrating the pattern of Queensland's history, being evidence of a widespread social movement expressing Australian patriotism and nationalism during and immediately following the First World War [1914–18].

The place is important in demonstrating the principal characteristics of a particular class of cultural places.

The First World War Memorial demonstrates the principal characteristics of a class of commemorative structures erected as a record of the local impact of a major historical event and intended to endure, and is a major regional example of its type.

The place is important because of its aesthetic significance.

The place exhibits aesthetic characteristics valued by the community, including the landmark quality and aesthetic value and craftsmanship of the First World War memorial, and the contribution of the park and memorial to the Esk townscape.

The place has a strong or special association with a particular community or cultural group for social, cultural or spiritual reasons.

The place has a special association for the Esk community as a form of public recognition of local participation in a major historical event.

The place has a special association with the life or work of a particular person, group or organisation of importance in Queensland's history.

The memorial is significant as an unusual example of the work of Ipswich architect GB Gill.
