= George Gill (Australian footballer) =

Australian rules footballer

Personal information
- Full name: George Gill
- Born: 14 July 1892; Casterton, Victoria
- Died: 2 February 1967 (aged 74); Hamilton, Victoria
- Original team: Casterton

Playing career^{1}
| Years | Club | Games (Goals) |
| 1915 | Geelong | 7 (0) |
- ^{1} Playing statistics correct to the end of 1915.

George "Leather" Gill (14 July 1892 – 2 February 1967) was an Australian rules footballer who played with Geelong in the Victorian Football League (VFL).

George's son Pat Gill played 2 games with North Melbourne in 1946.

George's brother Frank Gill, who was a highly decorated player for Carlton, represented Victoria, as well as being a Carlton Captain, best and fairest winner, and a premiership player in 1938.

Two nephews John and Barry Gill also played for Carlton, their Father Wally Gill was George Gill's brother. Wally had trained with Carlton in 1926, but was injured during pre-season and headed back to Nhill.
