= George Reynolds Gill =

English painter

George Reynolds Gill (1828 in Hereford, Herefordshire – 1904) was a noted English portrait painter.
