= St Paul's Anglican Church, Ipswich =

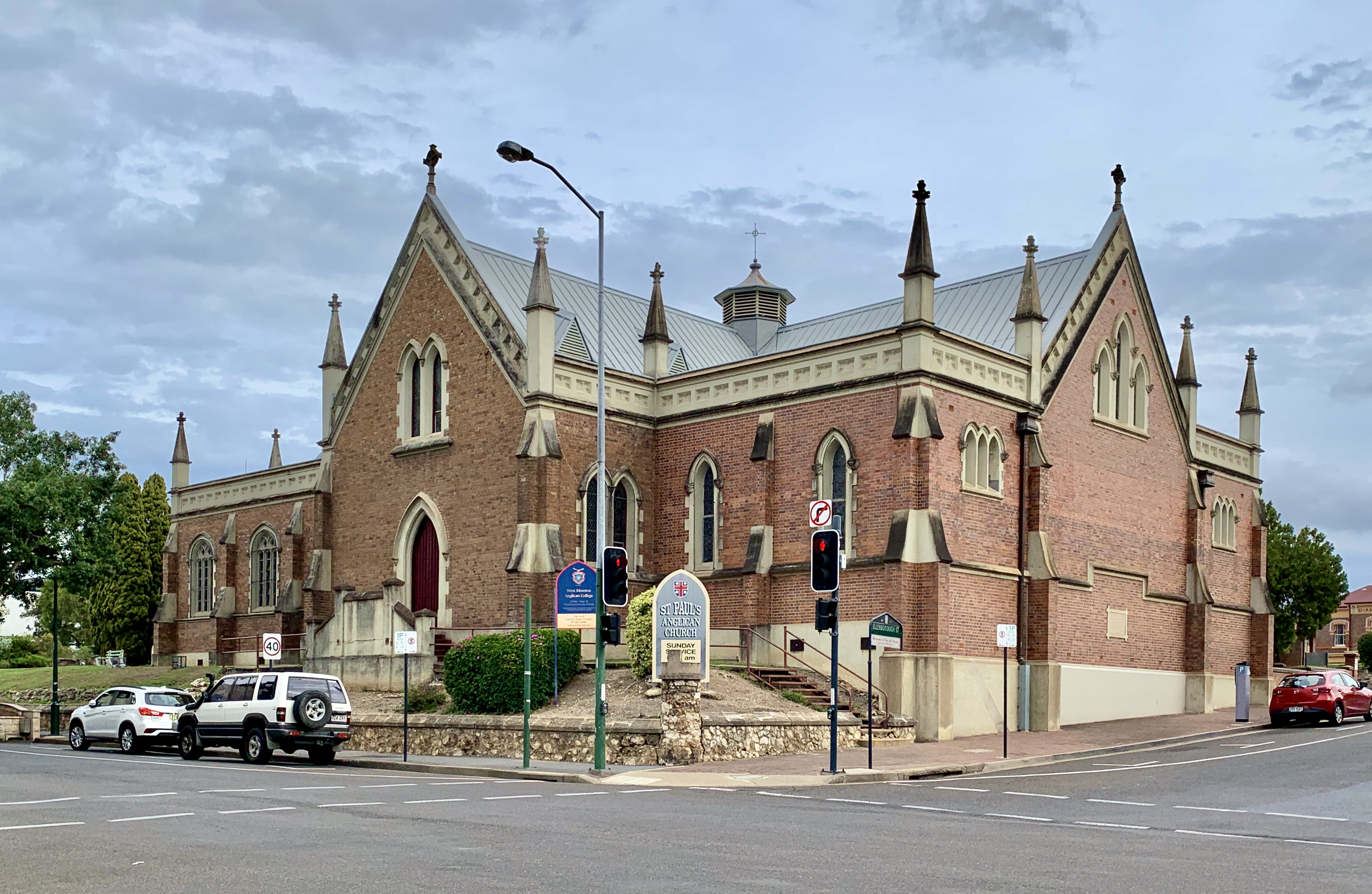
- St Paul's Anglican Church, 2020

- Location within Queensland Location within Australia
- 27.6145°S 152.7582°E
- Location: 124 Brisbane Street, Ipswich, City of Ipswich, Queensland, Australia

History
- Design period: 1840s–1860s (mid-19th century)
- Built: 1855–1929

Queensland Heritage Register
- Official name: St Pauls Anglican Church and Rectory
- Type: state heritage (landscape, built)
- Designated: 21 October 1992
- Reference no.: 600591
- Significant period: 1850s–1860s (historical); 1850s–1920s (fabric)
- Significant components: fence/wall – perimeter, wall/s, residential accommodation – rectory, chapel, bell – church, stained glass window/s, views to, roof lantern / lantern light, furniture/fittings, memorial – tablet, memorial – cross, chimney/chimney stack, stalls – choir, terracing, pipe organ, church, roof/ridge ventilator/s / fleche/s

St Paul's Anglican Church is a heritage-listed church at 124 Brisbane Street, Ipswich, City of Ipswich, Queensland, Australia. It was built from 1855 to 1929. It was added to the Queensland Heritage Register on 21 October 1992.

== History ==
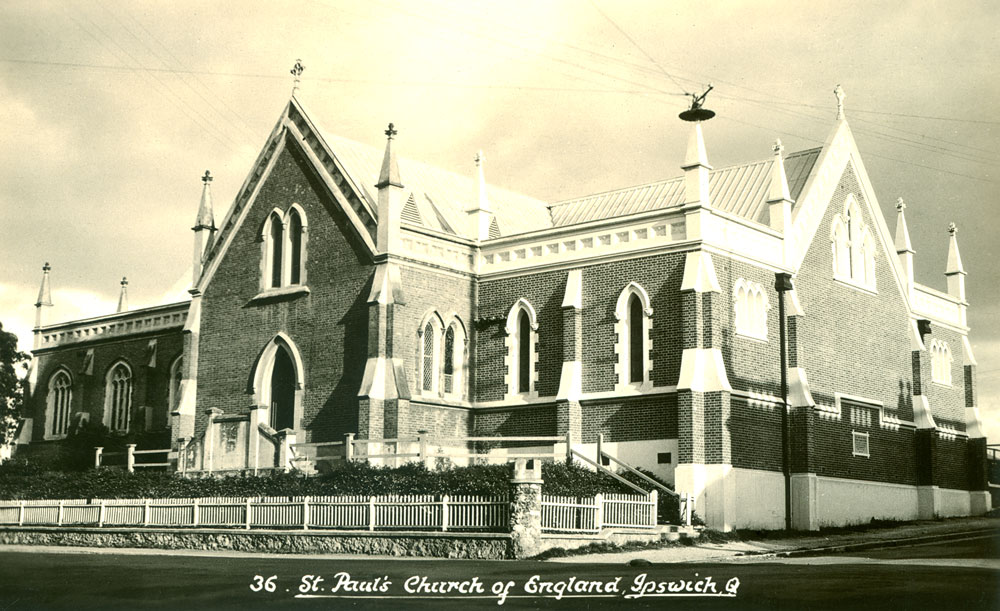
St Paul's Church of England, Ipswich, 1940s

St Paul's Anglican Church is a Revival Gothic brick church completed in 1859, supervised by William Wakeling but probably to a design by Edmund Blacket. The side aisles were added in 1888/89, architect F.D.G. Stanley, and the western extensions were added in 1929, architect George Brockwell Gill.

The first Church of England services in Ipswich were held in a timber building in Ellenborough Street. A brick church was then erected in 1850 on the corner of Brisbane and Nicholas Streets, opposite the present-day church. This was always intended to be a temporary building and was later used as a Sunday School and day school; it was demolished in 1877.

The foundation stone of St Paul's was laid in 1855 but the church was not completed until June 1859. The architect is believed to have been Edmund Thomas Blacket. Ipswich at that time was in the Diocese of Newcastle and similar designs were used for St Paul's at West Maitland and St John's at Newcastle. Blacket's former pupil William Wakeling arrived in Ipswich in 1856 and worked there for several years including some time as the partner of Thomas Casey as builder/architects; he carried out supervision of St Paul's and was also responsible for "the internal arrangements".

The building was of a high quality because the church was designed and built at a time when Ipswich was socially and economically buoyant. There was also intense rivalry between Ipswich and Brisbane and the rector was hopeful of attracting the new bishop to the church, making Ipswich a cathedral town. A pipe organ was imported from England and installed in 1860, the first in the colony. This organ still exists, although it has been rebuilt, repaired and relocated.

The gallery was built in 1882. At the same time, two lancet windows were installed in the eastern wall and a cast iron porch was added.

North and south aisles were added in 1888, designed by F.D.G. Stanley and built by Robert Wilson and Co.

In 1926, the old cast iron "Galilee porch" was replaced by the present porch; the bell in this porch is from the 1850 church. In 1929, Ipswich architect and prominent parishioner George Brockwell Gill designed and supervised an extension to the chancel, and the addition of an organ chamber, sacristy, chapel and vestry to the west end and southern transept. Major conservation work was carried out in 1992 under the supervision of Buchanan Architects.

The church contains fine stained glass windows and numerous memorials including marble tablets honouring people notable in Queensland history such as George Thorn and Thomas de Lacy Moffat.

In the north-east corner is the Martyrs Chapel which honours the Martyrs of New Guinea including medical missionary Mavis Parkinson who was killed by Japanese soldiers during World War II. The chapel contains a small bamboo cross in a glass case presented by the Bishop of South Tokyo and a cross found in an abandoned German mission. A Celtic cross in grey stone near the church entrance porch also honours Mavis Parkinson.

The church contains a memorial tablet for John Panton, an Ipswich pioneer, merchant and politician.

On 25 February 1966, the Governor of Queensland, Sir Henry Abel Smith, Governor of Queensland unveiled a commemorative baptismal font bowl and plaque in honour of Anna MacArthur (daughter of Philip Gidley King and wife of Hannibal Hawkins MacArthur), organised by the Queensland Women's Historical Association.

=== Hall ===
A church hall was built in 1908 but was demolished in 1962 along with the timber belltower and replaced by a new brick and steel parish centre which was dedicated as a war memorial; it was designed by Conrad and Gargett Architects.

=== Rectory ===
The rectory was built in 1895–6, designed by G. B. Gill. It replaced an earlier building on the same site which had become dilapidated. There have been only minor changes to this building since construction. It ceased being the rectory c. 1990 and is now used for church offices.

=== Grounds ===
The grounds of the church provide an attractive setting, and include a limestone perimeter wall, much of which was built prior to 1876. The Brisbane St section has long been a favourite place for Ipswich people to sit to watch processions. The limestone stone terraces were extended along Nicholas and Limestone Streets in the 1930s and the bus shelter in Nicholas Street was built in 1932.

== Description ==
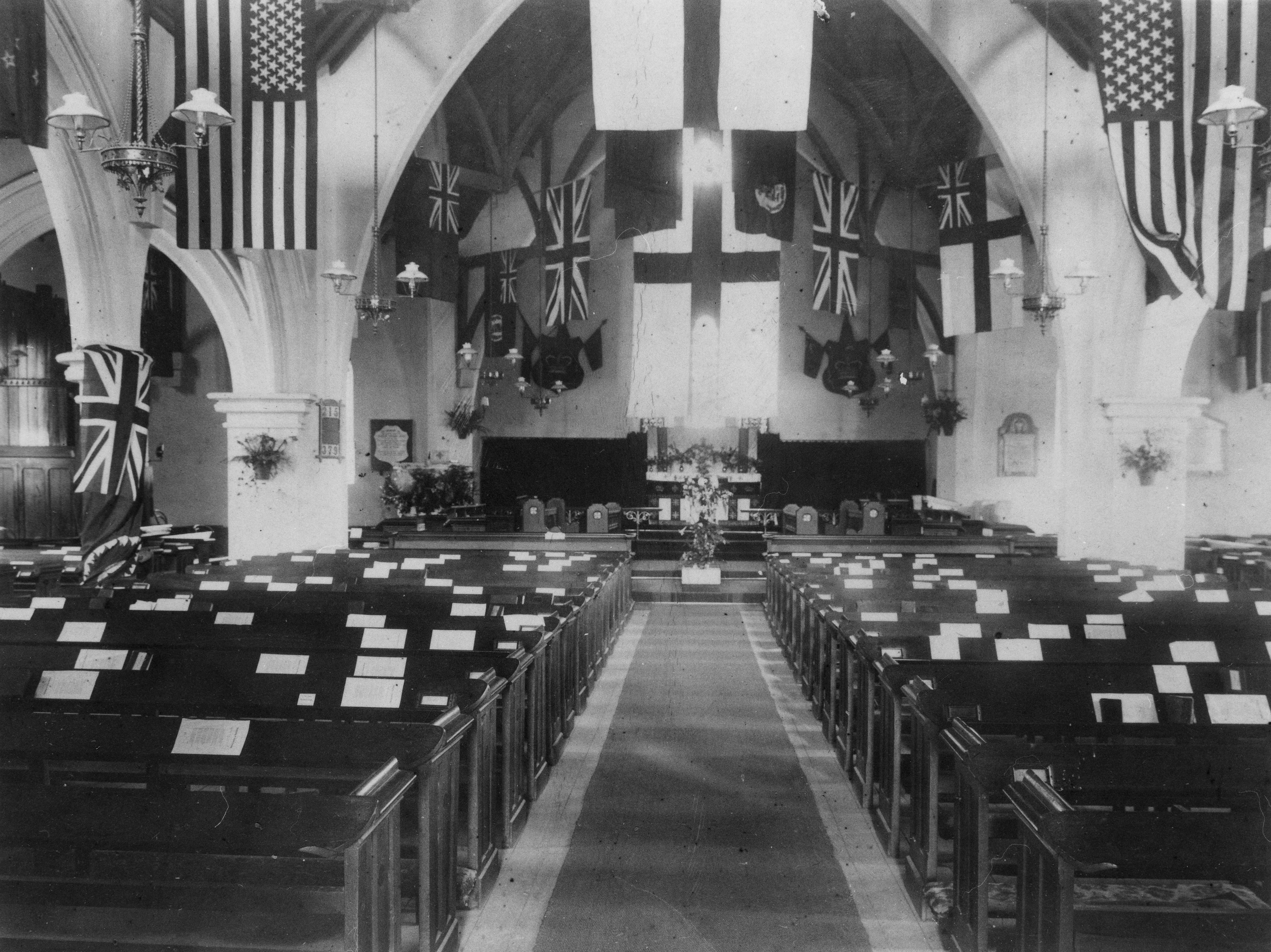
Interior of St Paul's, circa 1917

St Paul's Church occupies a whole block within the city centre of Ipswich. The site includes the church, church hall, rectory, gardens and perimeter limestone walls, all of which are dominant landmark elements within the urban setting.

The Revival Gothic church is of Latin cross plan form, with the sanctuary placed at the western end. External walls are of face brickwork and contain five arched windows of stained glass with small pivoting vents. The steeply pitched gable roof is sheeted with flat pan-and-roll galvanised iron and is penetrated by dormer window ventilators. The roof structure consists of finely proportioned hammer beam trusses which intersect above the crossing, supporting a raised lantern roof ventilator. The entrance porch is at the eastern end and leads to a foyer beneath the upper choir loft with timber screen, cast iron lace balustrading and cast iron spiral stair access. The new floor of the church is of traditional clear-finished hoop pine and walls are painted plaster. The church pews are of traditional design and appear to be original.

The northern transept did contain the organ and choir stalls, but the organ has been renovated and relocated to the southern transept. The southern transept is also extended to accommodate two vestries. Side aisles extend along both sides of the nave, terminating in small chapels at the western end. The church interior contains some fine timber joinery including sanctuary screens, communion rail and panelling of cedar and pine. The interior also contains numerous marble tablets and memorials, pulpit, baptismal font and lectern of fine quality. A chapel in the north-eastern corner of the nave honours Mavis Parkinson and contains an altar faced with New Guinea tapa cloth and a small bamboo cross in a glass case.

The rectory is a lowset timber building with verandahs on all sides and a fine projecting pedimented entrance porch to the east overlooking the town centre and d'Arcy Doyle Place. Walls are of chamferboard and the hipped roof is clad in corrugated galvanised iron. The roof form has distinctive metal ventilators and banks of brick chimneys with terracotta chimney pots.

The interior plan form of the rectory remains relatively unchanged except for minor modifications to accommodate the church offices, meeting rooms and storage space. Most of the cedar joinery, except for one fireplace surround, has survived. Contemporary car accommodation has been constructed at the rear and a disabled persons ramp built alongside the northern verandah.

The church grounds are raised above the surrounding footpaths and contained on all sides by early limestone retaining walls with sloping concrete copings, once surmounted by a small picket fence. A pair of circular crenellated gate pillars exist at the main northeast entrance and are constructed of random rubble limestone matching the walls adjacent. The garden contains some mature trees and a fine-grained Celtic cross memorial set on a stylobate of three steps and engraved with an inscription and traditional Celtic motifs.

== Heritage listing ==
St Paul's Anglican Church and Rectory was listed on the Queensland Heritage Register on 21 October 1992 having satisfied the following criteria.

The place is important in demonstrating the evolution or pattern of Queensland's history.

The place demonstrates the pattern of Queensland's history, exemplifying the buoyant mood of pre-Separation Ipswich and the aspirations of its citizens to construct community buildings worthy of its perceived importance.

The place demonstrates rare, uncommon or endangered aspects of Queensland's cultural heritage.

Completed in 1859, it is a rare example of a church built prior to Separation and is the oldest Anglican Church in Queensland; it contains the oldest pipe organ in Queensland.

The place is important because of its aesthetic significance.

The main church is a fine revival Gothic building constructed over a long period from 1855 to 1929. With its central city setting and landscaped grounds including a fine limestone wall and terraces, it is a major landmark in Ipswich.

The place has a strong or special association with a particular community or cultural group for social, cultural or spiritual reasons.

The church has been closely associated with the spiritual and social life of the Ipswich community since the 1850s.

The place has a special association with the life or work of a particular person, group or organisation of importance in Queensland's history.

It is closely associated with two important Queensland architects F.D.G. Stanley and G.B.Gill and also with Edmund Blacket and William Wakeling.

It is associated with the life and work of Anglican Church martyr Mavis Parkinson, a medical missionary who was killed in New Guinea during World War II. The rectory is a finely detailed example of a late Victorian residence and is a good example of the domestic work of G.B. Gill.
