= Queensland Institute of Architects =

The Queensland Institute of Architects was a professional society for architects in Queensland, Australia. It operated from 1888 until 1930, when it became a chapter of the Australian Institute of Architects.

== History ==
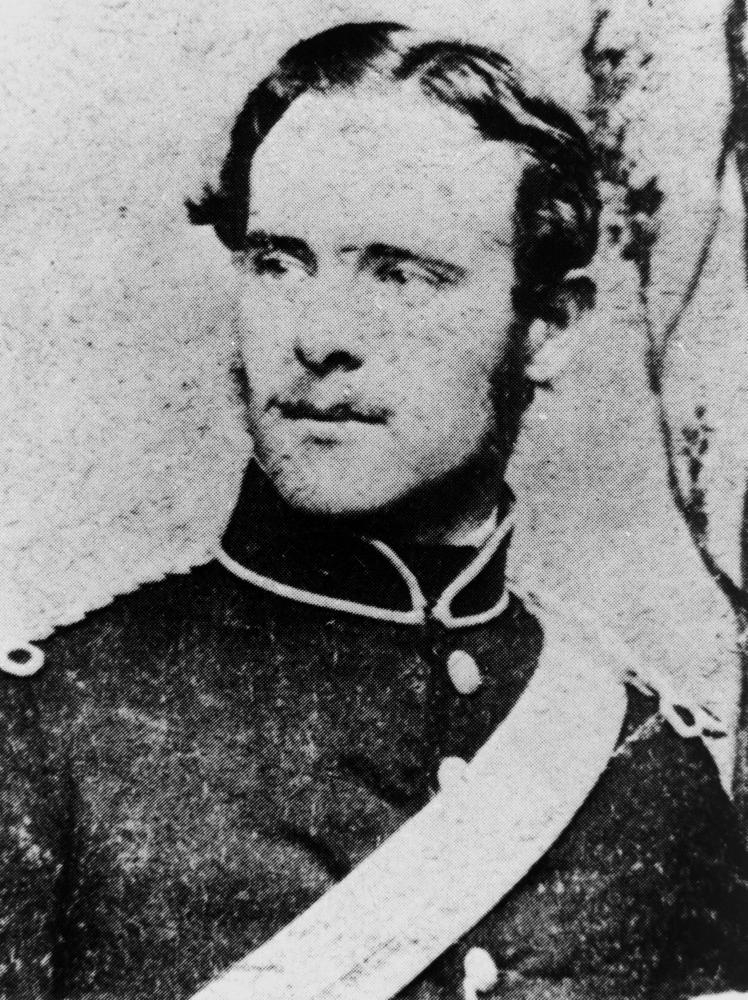
Francis Drummond Greville Stanley, first president

The Queensland Institute of Architects was established in September 1888 in Brisbane with 16 members and Francis Drummond Greville Stanley as its president. Apart from Stanley, its founding members included:

- Richard Gailey (vice president)
- George Henry Male Addison
- Claude William Chambers
- John James Clark
- John Jacob Cohen
- Francis Richard Hall
- Henry Hunter

== Presidents ==
- 1888: Francis Drummond Greville Stanley
- 1918–1919: George Brockwell Gill
- 1923–1924: Thomas Blair Moncrieff Wightman
- 1927–1931: Lange Powell

== Other notable members ==
- Leslie Corrie

== See also ==
- Architecture of Australia
