= Wat Phra Dhammakaya Melbourne =

Heritage-listed former church building, now temple, in Melbourne, Victoria, Australia

Wat Phra Dhammakaya Melbourne (Dhammakaya Multicultural Meditation Centre Melbourne)
- Thai: วัดพระธรรมกายเมลเบิร์น ประเทศออสเตรเลีย
- Location of the temple in Greater Metropolitan Melbourne

Religion
- Affiliation: Buddhist
- Rite: Dhammakaya
- Ecclesiastical or organisational status: Temple and meditation centre
- Ownership: Dhammakaya Society of Victoria Inc.
- Status: Active

Location
- Location: 41 Cookson Street, Camberwell, City of Boroondara, Melbourne, Victoria
- Country: Australia
- Interactive map of Wat Phra Dhammakaya Melbourne (Dhammakaya Multicultural Meditation Centre Melbourne)
- Coordinates: 37°49′33″S 145°03′35″E

Website
- sanghaoceania.org/en/watmelbourne

Second Church of Christ, Scientist
- Location: 41 Cookson Street, Camberwell, Victoria
- Country: Australia
- Previous denomination: Christian Scientist movement

History
- Status: Parish church (former)
- Founded: June 1924 (as a congregation)

Architecture
- Functional status: Deconsecrated
- Architect: Bates Smart & McCutcheon
- Architectural type: Church
- Style: Inter-war Stripped Classical
- Groundbreaking: 23 July 1936 (foundation stone)
- Completed: 22 November 1936; 89 years ago
- Construction cost: £19,660
- Closed: c. 2023 (as a church)

Specifications
- Capacity: 450 worshippers
- Materials: Reinforced concrete; bricks; timber; stained glass

History
- Built by: Hansen and Yuncken

Site notes
- Owner: Churches of Christ, Scientist and Christian Science Societies in Victoria (1936–c. 2023)

Victorian Heritage Register
- Official name: Second Church of Christ Scientist
- Type: Registered place
- Designated: 25 July 1996
- Reference no.: H1196
- Heritage overlay no.: HO34
- Category: Religion

The Wat Phra Dhammakaya Melbourne (Thai: วัดพระธรรมกายเมลเบิร์น ประเทศออสเตรเลีย), also known as the Dhammakaya Multicultural Meditation Centre Melbourne, is a Buddhist temple and Dhammakaya meditation centre, located at 41 Cookson Street in Camberwell, in the City of Boroondara, in the inner suburbs of Melbourne, in Victoria, Australia.

Built in 1936 as the Second Church of Christ, Scientist, the building previously served as a church for the Christian Science movement until c. 2023.

The former church building, located on the traditional lands of the Bunurong people, was added to the Victorian Heritage Register on 25 July 1996 in recognition of its architectural importance; and was also added to a non-statutory list by the Victorian branch of the National Trust on 28 October 1982.

== Buddhist temple ==
As of December 2024, the former Christian Science movement building was repurposed for use as a Buddhist temple and meditation centre that follows the Dhammakaya tradition.

== Second Church of Christ, Scientist ==
The Christian Scientist movement, which was founded in 1879 in Boston, Massachusetts, began as an offshoot of Protestant religions, and established a dedication to modern architectural imagery worldwide. The church believed that a pure architectural design reflected the philosophical basis of the faith.

In Melboure, the Second Church of Christ, Scientist was established in the inner suburbs in June 1924 when the first services were held in a Masonic hall in Launder Street, Hawthorn. The Christian Scientist movement purchased the Cookson Street site in February 1933, whilst continuing to worship in Hawthorn. Bates Smart & McCutcheon were commissioned to build a church on the site and the foundation stone was laid on 23 July 1936; the builders were Hansen and Yuncken; the total cost of the church building was £19,660, including the pipe organ and furnishings; and the opening services was held on 22 November 1936.

The Camberwell church building was designed in the Moderne–Inter-war Stripped Classical manner. The building, constructed of reinforced concrete, was designed with overlapping cuboids of banded, cream brickwork with patterned brick cornices, used geometric massing to achieve a monumental form. When in use as a Christian church, the building comprised a Sunday school at ground level, administration at the rear, and the church as an area for worship, at the first floor level. The building, with its limited ornamentation, was at the vanguard of church architectural styling. Churches within Victoria generally employed eclectic styling until the post-World War II period.

As an excellent example of its style, the building was a recipient of the Royal Victorian Institute of Architects (RVIA) Street Architecture Medal in 1938 – the first building outside of the City of Melbourne to receive a RVIA award. The building was notable as an influential in the architectural profession and is an important early example of the union between religious worship and Modernistic styling. It represented an early and significant break with traditional stylistic concerns in church architecture. The building, with its resolved design and skilful execution, demonstrated the influence of northern European and American architecture on Australian designs. The First Church of Christ, Scientist in Perth, Western Australia, was completed in 1939, in a similar style.

During construction, a Hill, Norman & Beard pipe organ was installed in the church.

Set on 1,416 square metres (15,240 sq ft), the Churches of Christ, Scientist and Christian Science Societies in Victoria congregation sold the church building in September 2022, and as of 2026, the movement did not have a permanent location for worship in the Camberwell area; with services held in Frankston, Geelong West, St Kilda Road, Ringwood and Mount Waverley.

== See also ==
- Architecture of Melbourne
- Wat Phra Dhammakaya
- List of Buddhist temples in Australia
- List of former Christian Science churches, societies and buildings
- List of places on the Victorian Heritage Register in the City of Boroondara
