= Bank of Australasia =

Former Australian bank (1835-1951)

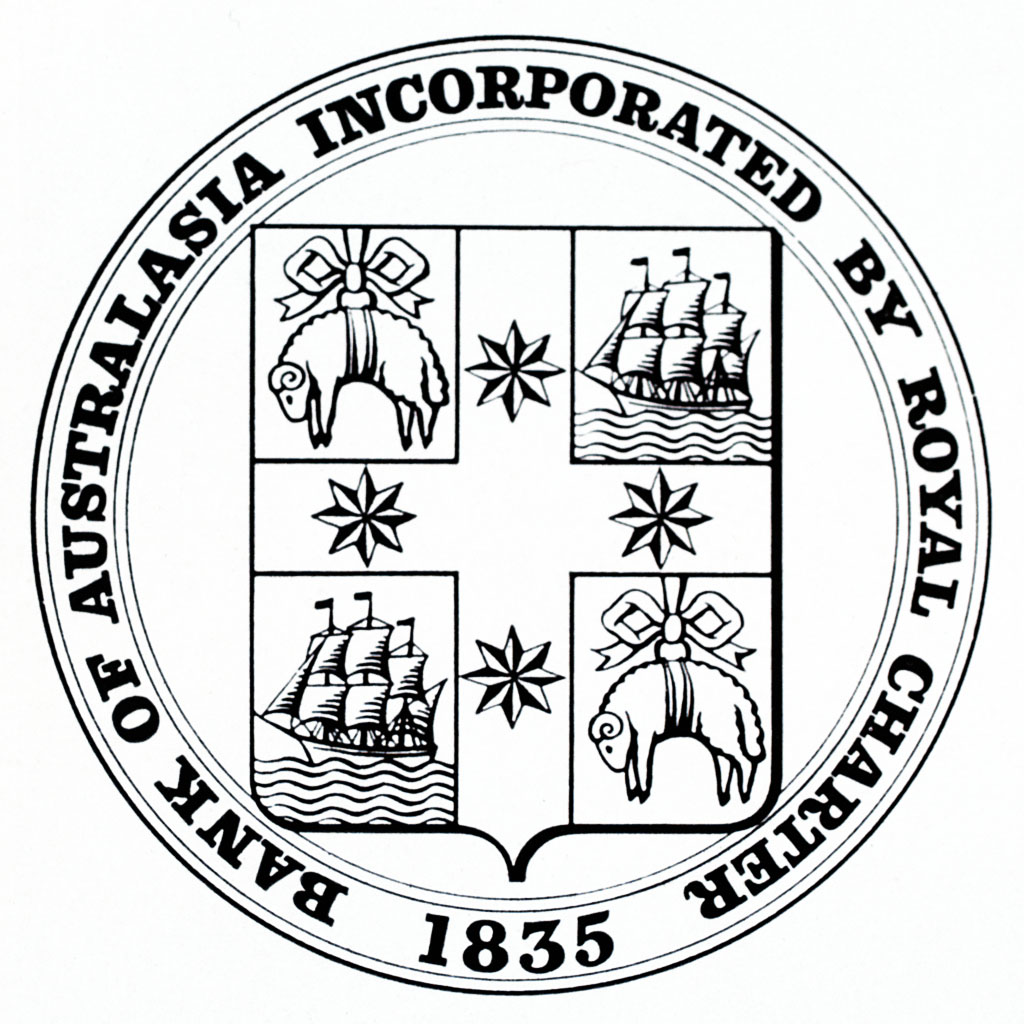
- Company type: Bank
- Industry: financial service activities, except insurance and pension funding
- Founded: 1834
- Defunct: 1951
- Fate: Merged with the Union Bank of Australia to form the Australia and New Zealand Bank
- Headquarters: Melbourne, Victoria
- Area served: Australia

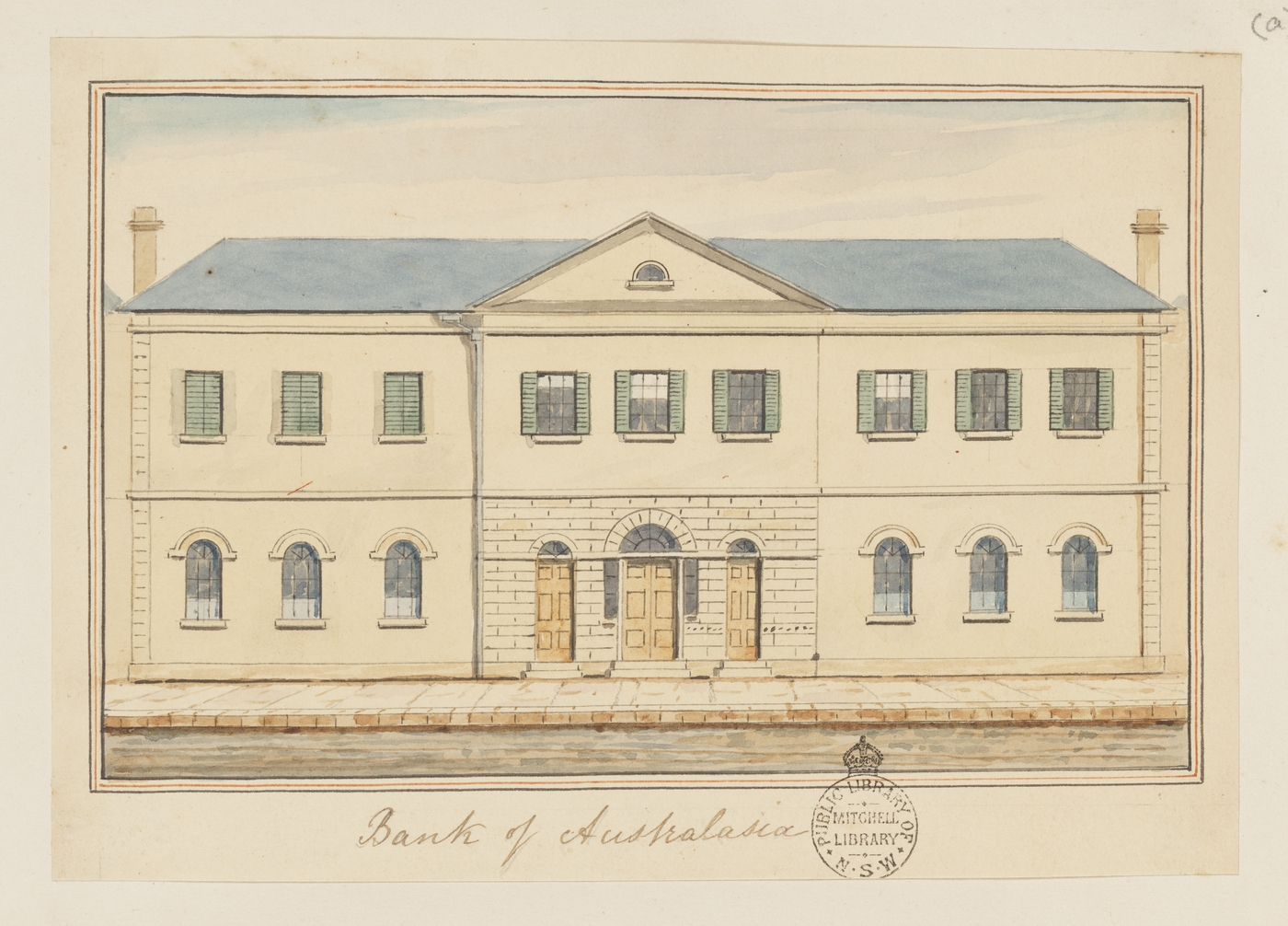
Bank of Australasia, Sydney, 1840s. (State Library of New South Wales)

The Bank of Australasia was an Australian bank in operation from 1835 to 1951.

Headquartered in London, the bank was incorporated by royal charter in March 1834. It had initially been planned to additionally include first South Africa and then Ceylon in the bank's operations; however, both these moves were blocked by the Lords of the Treasury. Its first branch opened in Sydney on 14 December 1835, followed by branches in Hobart and Launceston on 1 January 1836, in the latter city by taking over the former Cornwall Bank. A Melbourne branch opened on 28 August 1838 and an Adelaide branch on 14 January 1839. It opened a Perth branch in May 1841 when it absorbed the original Bank of Western Australia; however, the branch was closed in 1844 and the bank would not reopen in that city until 1894. It suffered financial difficulties during the 1840s depression, in part because of a controversial loan to the failing Bank of Australia which resulted in significant litigation.

Having opened a Geelong branch in 1846, it rapidly expanded throughout Victoria during the Victorian gold rush, with branches in Ballarat, Castlemaine, Williamstown, Portland, Warrnambool and Port Fairy opening in 1853-54 and Bendigo and Beechworth branches soon after. It decided upon a New Zealand expansion in 1863, opening in Auckland, Christchurch and Dunedin in 1864 and Wellington in 1866. A grand headquarters was built on Collins Street in the heart of Melbourne's financial district in 1875–76. The bank survived the Australian banking crisis of 1893, which resulted in the collapse of a number of its competitors. Its reopening in Western Australia following the discovery of gold in 1893 saw branches in Fremantle, Coolgardie and Cue in 1894 and Menzies and Kalgoorlie in 1895.

It merged with the Union Bank of Australia to form the Australia and New Zealand Bank on 1 October 1951.

== Historic former branches ==
A number of the bank's former branches are now heritage-listed. These include:

- the former Bank of Australasia Headquarters in the Melbourne CBD
- the former George Street, Sydney branch
- the former Ipswich, Queensland branch
- the former Castlemaine, Victoria branch
- the former Chiltern, Victoria branch
- the former Port Fairy, Victoria branch
- the former Williamstown, Victoria branch
- the former Port Adelaide, South Australia branch
- the former Robe, South Australia branch
- the former Fremantle, Western Australia branch
