= Victoria Cross Tower =

- Interactive map of the Victoria Cross Tower area

General information
- Type: Office
- Location: Sydney, Australia
- Coordinates: 33.8374°S 151.2076°E
- Construction started: 2021
- Opening: 2025

Height
- Height: 170 metres

Design and construction
- Developer: Lendlease

Victoria Cross Tower is an office skyscraper in Sydney, Australia. Designed by Bates Smart, the tower stands at a height of 170 metres.

== History ==
Construction works of the building, designed by the architecture firm Bates Smart and developed by real estate company Lendlease as part of the broader redevelopment project of the area above the new Victoria Cross metro station, began in 2021 and were completed in 2025.

== Description ==
The building is located in North Sydney's CBD. The skyscraper, which has 42 floors and a height of 170 meters, consists of a three-level retail podium supporting an office tower, whose façade is divided into a series of stacked modules of 8-12 floors.
