= Swarved Mahamandir =

Hindu temple at Varanasi, India

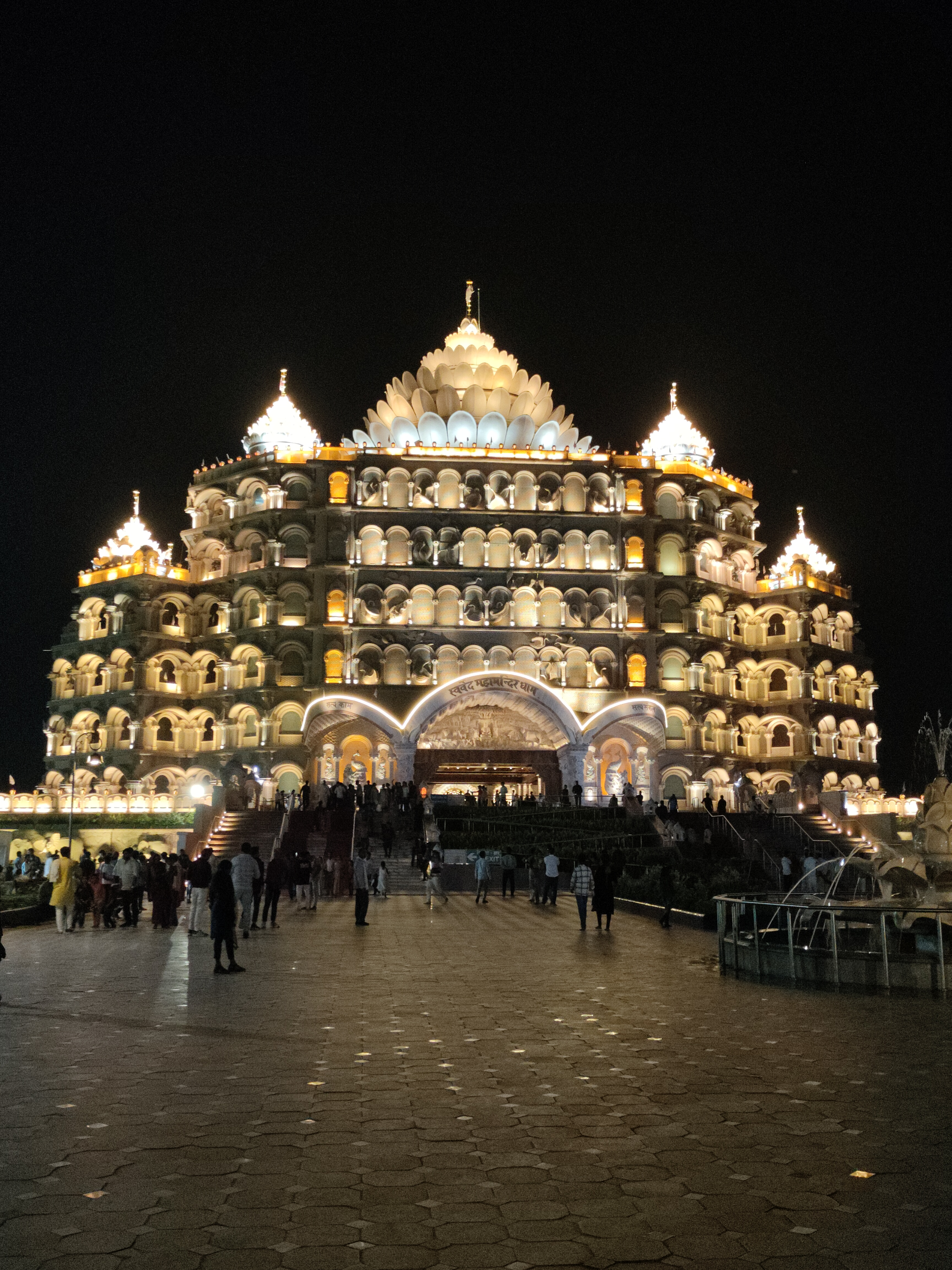

- Location in Uttar Pradesh Swarved Mahamandir (India)

Religion
- Affiliation: Hinduism
- District: Varanasi

Location
- Location: Varanasi
- State: Uttar Pradesh
- Country: India
- Interactive map of Swarved Mahamandir
- Coordinates: 25°24′12″N 83°4′12″E

Architecture
- Completed: 2023

Website
- www.swarved-mahamandir.org

Swarved Mahamandir is a charitable meditation centre built in Varanasi and inaugurated by Indian Prime Minister Narendra Modi and with its seven-storey claims to be the biggest meditation centre in the World. The centre is built with an estimated cost of Rs 100 crores and has a seating capacity of 20,000 people at a time. Around 3137 verses of Swarveda are carved on the walls of the mahamandir which is covered with Makarana Marble.

== About the Centre ==
Swarved Mahamandir was built with an estimated cost of Rs 100 crores and inaugurated by Prime Minister of India Narendra Modi on 17 December 2023. The centre with claims of being the biggest meditation centre in World was opened to public as part of centenary celebrations of Akhil Bhartiya Vihangam Yog Sansthan.

== The Architecture ==
Swarved Mahamandir is built in an area covering around 3,00,000 square feet with a seating capacity of 20,000 people. The centre walls are covered with sandstones with pink in colour.

The meditation centre is built in seven floors with around 3,137 verses from the collection of swarved printed on its walls made of Makarana Marble. The other features of mahamandir are 1. Lotus dome with 125 petals 2. Location of Research centre for conscious studies.
