= Halo Tower =

- Interactive map of the Halo Tower area
- Alternative names: 15-25 Hunter Street

General information
- Type: Office
- Location: Sydney, Australia
- Coordinates: 33.865875°S 151.208274°E
- Construction started: 2026
- Opening: 2030

Design and construction
- Developer: Milligan Group; Cbus Property

The Halo Tower is an office skyscraper in Sydney, Australia, which is currently under construction. Designed by Bates Smart, the tower will stand at a height of 214 metres.

== History ==
Construction of the building, designed by the architecture firm Bates Smart and developed by a joint venture between Milligan Group and Cbus Property, is scheduled to begin in late 2026, with completion expected in 2030. The site on which the tower will rise was assembled by Milligan Group over several years through the acquisition and consolidation of multiple smaller properties, most of whose existing buildings will be demolished to make way for the new skyscraper.

== Description ==
Located in Sydney's CBD at the corner of Hunter Street and Pitt Street, the building will reach a height of 214 metres and have more than 50 storeys, with a total floor area of approximately 42,000 square metres. The project aims to become one of the tallest timber-hybrid buildings in the world, combining a composite structural system with high-performance environmental solutions.

The tower will primarily include office space, while also incorporating retail space at street level.
