= Old Ipswich Town Hall =

Ipswich Town Hall
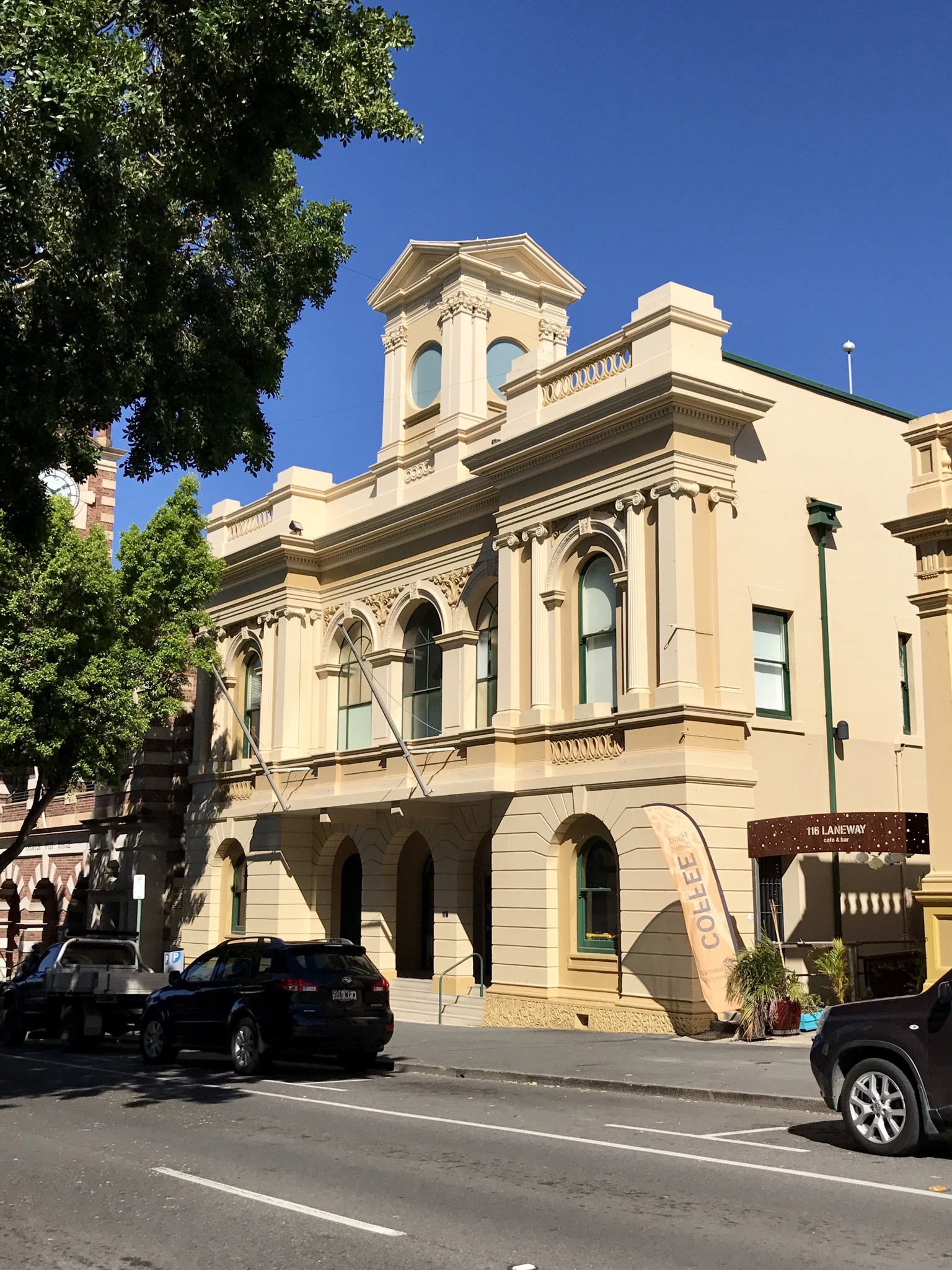
- Old Ipswich Town Hall, 2017 (note the blank clock face)

- Location within Queensland
- 27.6147°S 152.7591°E
- Location: 116 Brisbane Street, Ipswich, City of Ipswich, Queensland, Australia

History
- Design period: 1840s–1860s (mid-19th century)
- Built: 1861–1879

Site notes
- Architect: James Percy Owen Cowlishaw
- Architectural style: Classicism

Queensland Heritage Register
- Official name: Old Town Hall, Mechanics School of Arts, School of Arts
- Type: state heritage (built)
- Designated: 21 October 1992
- Reference no.: 600566
- Significant period: 1860s–1870s, c. 1941 (fabric); 1860s–1980s (historical, social)
- Significant components: council chamber/meeting room, tower - clock, office/s, proscenium arch, hall

Old Ipswich Town Hall is a heritage-listed former town hall at 116 Brisbane Street, Ipswich, City of Ipswich, Queensland, Australia. It was designed by James Percy Owen Cowlishaw and built from 1861 to 1879. It is also known as Mechanics School of Arts and the School of Arts. It was added to the Queensland Heritage Register on 21 October 1992.

Since its inception in 1861 the building has had many uses, and several extensions. The old town hall was originally the Ipswich School of Arts, incorporating a library and meeting rooms. The façade of the building fronting Brisbane Street dates from 1864 and is 2 stories of brick with render finish and rich decoration.

The Ipswich Town Council assumed control of the building in 1869 when the School of Arts committee experienced financial problems. By 1892 it was felt that the town hall was too small and an extension was designed by well-known architect George Brockwell Gill who is responsible for many beautiful and heritage listed buildings in Ipswich.

In the late 19th century and first half of the 20th century the hall was used for adult education classes, staging of plays and concerts, boxing tournaments, immunisation clinics, and the Red Cross Chelsea Flower Show. During the 1940s dances were a big drawcard. The hall closed to the public and became council offices in 1969.

== History ==
The Old Ipswich Town Hall is a two-storeyed painted rendered masonry building with a clock tower and a hipped corrugated iron roof at the rear. It is located in the centre of Ipswich fronting Brisbane Street to the north.

A Deed of Grant for the original land content, allotments 10 and 23 of section 5, was issued on 7 September 1861 for School of Arts purposes to the trustees Benjamin Cribb, Charles Gray, Frederick Forbes, George Thorn and Henry Challinor. The building was constructed in three stages, with the rear section in 1861, the Brisbane Street section in 1864, and the clock tower in 1879.

Schools of Arts were synonymous with mechanics' institutes, established in Britain early in the 19th century, and transplanted throughout the British Empire during the colonial era. The movement was instituted by George Birkbeck, who in 1800 established a class for journeymen mechanics in Glasgow, and later formed the first Mechanics' Institute in London in 1824. The purpose of forming such an institute was to improve the education of working men, and to instruct them in various trades. By the late 19th century, Mechanics' Institutes had become popular agencies of adult education in general.

Mechanics' institutes were part of a wider 19th century movement promoting popular education in Britain, at which time co-operative societies, working men's colleges and the university extension movement were established. The call for popular education in turn can be contextualised within the broader liberal, laissez-faire, non-interventionist philosophy which dominated British social, economic and political ideologies in the 19th century. In this environment, Mechanics' institutes flourished as a means by which working men might improve their lot, either through self-education (the provision of reading rooms was an important facility provided by the Institutes), or by participating in instructional classes organised and funded by Institute members.

In the Australian colonies, mechanics' institutes were more likely to be called Schools of Arts, and they were more likely to be run by the middle-classes. The provision of reading rooms, museums, lectures and classes were still important, but the Australian schools were also more likely to include a social programme in their calendar of events.

The Ipswich Literary Institution was formed at a public meeting held on 31 July 1850, with its aim being to provide a news room and library. Six days later another public meeting established a School of Arts merging with the Ipswich Literary Institution for the purpose of obtaining the New South Wales Government subsidy (the establishment of Queensland as a separate state did not occur until 1859) which was being made available to Schools of Arts.

In July 1854 the name of the literary institution of the School of Arts became the Ipswich Subscription Library and reading room. At a further public meeting on 11 August 1858 the School of Arts Society again changed its name to the Mechanics School of Arts and soon after made an application to the New South Wales Government for a grant of land for the purpose of erecting a permanent School of Arts building. Records indicate that at the time a cottage formerly used as the Courthouse was being occupied.

The Queensland Government selected the site of the old Courthouse and lock-up in Brisbane Street and the foundation stone was laid on Thursday 7 February 1861 by the first Queensland Governor, George Bowen. The Governor officially opened the Mechanics School of Arts on 24 October 1861, and in his speech Governor Bowen said:

Let me observe that I give what has been called the "glorious title of the working classes" not to those only who earn their living by the labour of the hand, but to those also who earn their living by the more anxious and weary labour of the brain. In one or other sense all men in Ipswich are working men.

The first stage section, set back from the Brisbane Street frontage, housed a library and meeting rooms which were used for civic events, evening classes and for entertainment purposes. The hall originally had an exposed truss roof, but a plaster ceiling was installed in 1878 to improve the room's acoustics. The ceiling incorporated iron bolts with rings for the convenience of acrobats, trapeze artists and other aerial performers. Gas was officially turned on in Ipswich on 15 August 1878, and two large "sunlights" containing 16 burners each were installed in the building.

The Ipswich Municipal Council had applied to the Government for a grant of land on the southeast corner of East and Roderick Streets for the purposes of building a town hall and a depot for tools and other equipment. This was granted early in 1861 but a further request for money to build the town hall was refused and the Council continued to use a small room in the old Courthouse on a temporary basis. The Council explored a number of options for more permanent premises against a background of opposition from ratepayers who at one time submitted a petition objecting to the erection of a town hall. For a period of seven years the Council occupied a brick building owned by George Thorn in East Street. In 1863 the council requested the School of Arts committee to erect an addition to their building for the purposes of town hall offices.

The School of Arts committee had intended to extend their building towards Brisbane Street for their own use, and plans were made for an addition. The ground floor of the two-storeyed addition was to be let as offices for public institutions, and the first floor was to be a reading room, library, committee room and classrooms. Tenders were called in 1864, and by 18 June 1864 James Cowlishaw had been appointed architect.

The trustees had borrowed £2,000 in 1865, and when the date of release of the mortgage arrived, the trustees were unable to pay monies due. The School of Arts committee approached the Council in November 1868 with a proposal that the Ipswich Municipal Council undertake the management of the School of Arts, and in 1869 the mortgagor sold the land to the Ipswich Municipal Council for £2,465. In August 1889 a residence (no longer extant) was built for the School of Arts librarian fronting Limestone Street at the rear of the hall.

Following the death of Governor Samuel Blackall (1809–1871), a memorial committee was formed to present a turret clock to the town of Ipswich as a suitable memorial. The position favoured was the School of Arts building, and on 13 November 1879 it was reported that the town clock was illuminated for the first time. The clock was illuminated by gas flame, and the tower was designed by Queensland Colonial Architect Francis Drummond Greville Stanley. The lighting of the clock was unsuccessful, and in 1896 it was reported that the town clock has loved darkness rather than light for a great many years, as the heat arising from the burners interfered with the workings of the machinery.

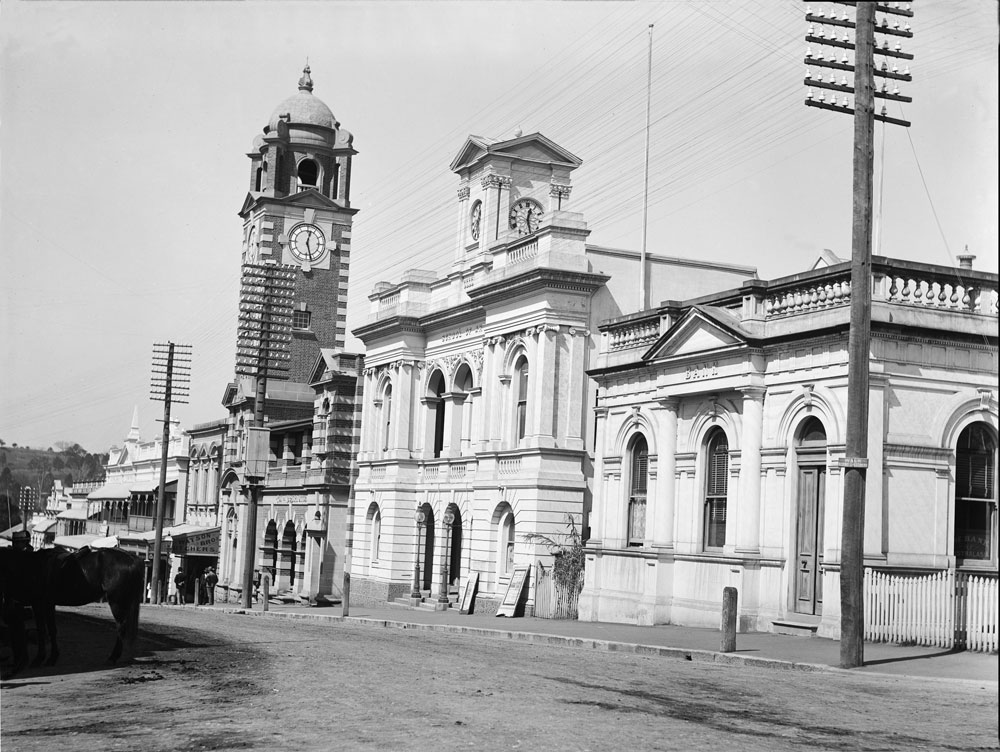
Post Office, Town Hall and Bank of Australasia (left to right), circa 1902, with clock faces on the town hall

In 1901 the new Ipswich Post Office with a tall clock tower was built next door, at which time Ipswich had two clocks side by side, generally unsynchronised. This continued until 1912 when the Post Office clock was illuminated. Tenders were called in December 1912 for the sale of the Town Hall clock which was eventually sold to the Sandgate Town Council for their new council chambers, the Sandgate Town Hall.

By 1917 the Ipswich Council had outgrown its premises, and plans were drawn up by architect George Brockwell Gill for a second storey, but at £1,200 the idea was abandoned. In 1937 the council was renting additional accommodation in the Soldiers' Memorial Hall, and plans were prepared by architect Douglas Francis Woodcraft Roberts for a new town hall and auditorium to seat 1800 people. This was also abandoned, as 1,500 ratepayers petitioned against the building. A compromise solution involved the council purchasing the adjacent St Paul's Young Men's Club in June 1938, and major renovation works to the town hall were completed by builders Harper and Vincent in 1941. These were the last works to be carried out on the building until the 1970s.

In 1947 the adjacent Bank of Australasia building was renovated to house the School of Arts Library, and in 1948 the Ipswich Council formally took over control of the library. A new Ipswich Civic Centre was opened in July 1975 at the corner of Limestone and Nicholas Streets by the Prime Minister Gough Whitlam. The council converted the old auditorium and stage area of the Old Town Hall to office space, and the Council Chambers remained in the front section of the Old Town Hall. The library was relocated from the former Bank of Australasia building to the former St Pauls Young Men's Club, and the rates office was transferred from the Old Town Hall to the former Bank of Australasia building. The council finally moved out in 1985 when a new council administrative building was completed in South Street, and the library was moved to rented premises and a City Council Art Gallery was located in its place.

After the destruction by fire of Reids Department Store in August 1985, the Old Town Hall building was converted into retail space, including the installation of a concrete mezzanine floor in the hall. In 1995, a hydraulic lift was installed in the main hall space linking the mezzanine floor to the ground floor and a steel fire stair was constructed on the east side.

== Description ==
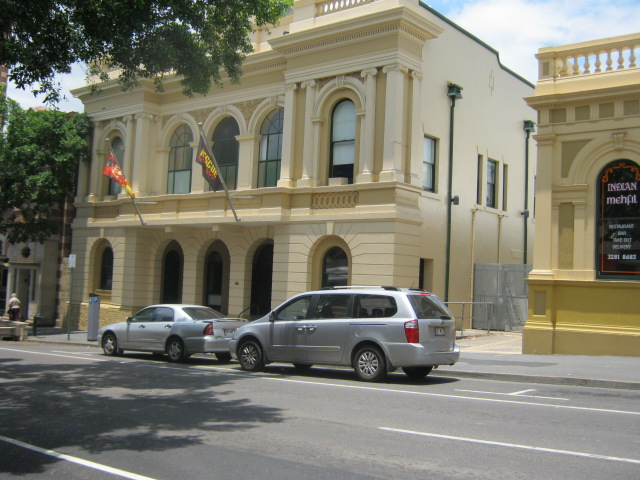
Town Hall (Ipswich)

The Old Town Hall, a two-storeyed painted rendered masonry building with a hipped corrugated iron roof to the rear, is located in the centre of Ipswich fronting Brisbane Street to the north. The building is situated within a precinct containing the adjoining Post Office to the east, with London's Pharmacy adjacent to the Post Office, the former Bank of Australasia adjacent to the west and the former St Pauls Young Men's Club to the southwest.

The building consists of three stages, with the original 1861 hall at the rear, the 1864 section fronting Brisbane Street, and a clock tower added in 1879.

The Brisbane Street section has a symmetrical ornately decorated facade with classical detailing to the street, which consists of a wide central bay with a projecting narrower bay to either side. The ground floor has three arches to the central section, with one arch to either side, with coursed render expressing voussoirs and a vermiculated base. The central arches open to an entrance portico and are accessed via wide steps, with the side arches housing window displays. The first floor is composed similarly, with the three central arches originally to a loggia, but now glazed. These arches have expressed imposts, vermiculated keystones, and decorative mouldings to voussoir and abutments. The side arches house tall narrow sash windows which have similar imposts, voussoirs, keystones and abutment treatments, and which are flanked by circular Ionic pilasters with square Ionic pilasters at the corners of the projecting bay. The pilasters are supported by a deep base, either side of an enclosed balustrade panel of interlocking circles, and in turn support a heavy entablature with a parapet above which has open balustrade panels of interlocking circles.

The clock tower, square in plan, has paired square Corinthian pilasters at each corner supporting an entablature with pediment to each face. The clock faces have been removed, and are now blank. A cantilevered awning has been added to the central section above the ground level, and slightly projects from the building with an edging which mimics the base of the pilasters, but which obscures the former loggia's open balustrade details.

The rear hall was built as a single-storeyed high ceiling structure with a basement to the south. The structure is now two-storeyed with basement, due to the insertion of the mezzanine floor during the 1980s. The building has a corrugated iron hipped roof with ridge ventilators, expressed banding at ground floor and mezzanine level and tall arched windows along the east and west elevations. Door openings have been made in the west wall to allow access to an adjoining recently created public square, and evidence of earlier door and window openings which have been closed over can be seen in the north and south ends of the building. The south elevation, originally the rear of the stage area, has large arched header sash windows to the ground level and three closed over circular openings to the mezzanine level. The basement level has a door flanked by two arched header sash windows either side of a large central arched opening. The opening has been glazed and has a large tiled awning. A steel fire stair has been added to the east elevation.

Internally, the ground floor has a central foyer with paired panelled timber doors in an amber glass panel sidelights and fanlight assembly. Retail tenancies are located to either side, and have been remodelled several times. Toilets and store are located behind these, and a turned cedar staircase with square newel posts accesses the first floor. Walls are rendered, and an arched opening leads into the hall at the rear with a timber ramp accommodating a change in floor level. The hall space has ashlar scribed rendered walls, and has undergone several modifications, including a concrete mezzanine floor with central opening, twin staircases from the mezzanine level to the rear stage area, a central hydraulic lift shaft, and several openings in exterior walls. The rear stage area has a proscenium arch with classical details including side pilasters, entablature and keystone. The stage area is accessed via a central stair, and has a narrow stair in the southwest corner accessing the basement level.

The first floor of the Brisbane Street section has a central reception area with a skylight and offices to exterior walls. The mezzanine level has a hardboard panelled ceiling with cover strip mouldings and curved edges to side walls. The top of the tall sash windows project above the floor level and light the floor area, and arches either side of the proscenium arch access the top level of the stage area. This area has a hipped boarded timber ceiling. The basement level houses toilets and storeroom.

The rear of the site has a bitumen surfaced carpark.

== Heritage listing ==
Old Town Hall was listed on the Queensland Heritage Register on 21 October 1992 having satisfied the following criteria.

The place is important in demonstrating the evolution or pattern of Queensland's history.

Although no longer a civic building, the Old Town Hall retains important associations with the cultural and municipal development of Ipswich, and the Ipswich community.

The place demonstrates rare, uncommon or endangered aspects of Queensland's cultural heritage.

The interiors include the original proscenium arch, central cedar staircase and some original joinery, and the rear section is one of the few surviving buildings in Ipswich dating from 1861.

The place is important in demonstrating the principal characteristics of a particular class of cultural places.

It demonstrates the architecture considered appropriate for a municipal building of the 1860s, and is associated with two important early Queensland architects; James Cowlishaw and Francis Drummond Greville Stanley.

The interiors include the original proscenium arch, central cedar staircase and some original joinery, and the rear section is one of the few surviving buildings in Ipswich dating from 1861.

The place is important because of its aesthetic significance.

Located within the historic centre of Ipswich, the building is an important component of the central Ipswich streetscape of civic buildings, all of which were designed in variants of the classical style.

The place has a strong or special association with a particular community or cultural group for social, cultural or spiritual reasons.

Although no longer a civic building, the Old Town Hall retains important associations with the cultural and municipal development of Ipswich, and the Ipswich community.

The place has a special association with the life or work of a particular person, group or organisation of importance in Queensland's history.

It demonstrates the architecture considered appropriate for a municipal building of the 1860s, and is associated with two important early Queensland architects; James Cowlishaw and Francis Drummond Greville Stanley.
