= Bank of Australasia Headquarters =

Heritage-listed building in Melbourne, Victoria

Former Bank of Australasia
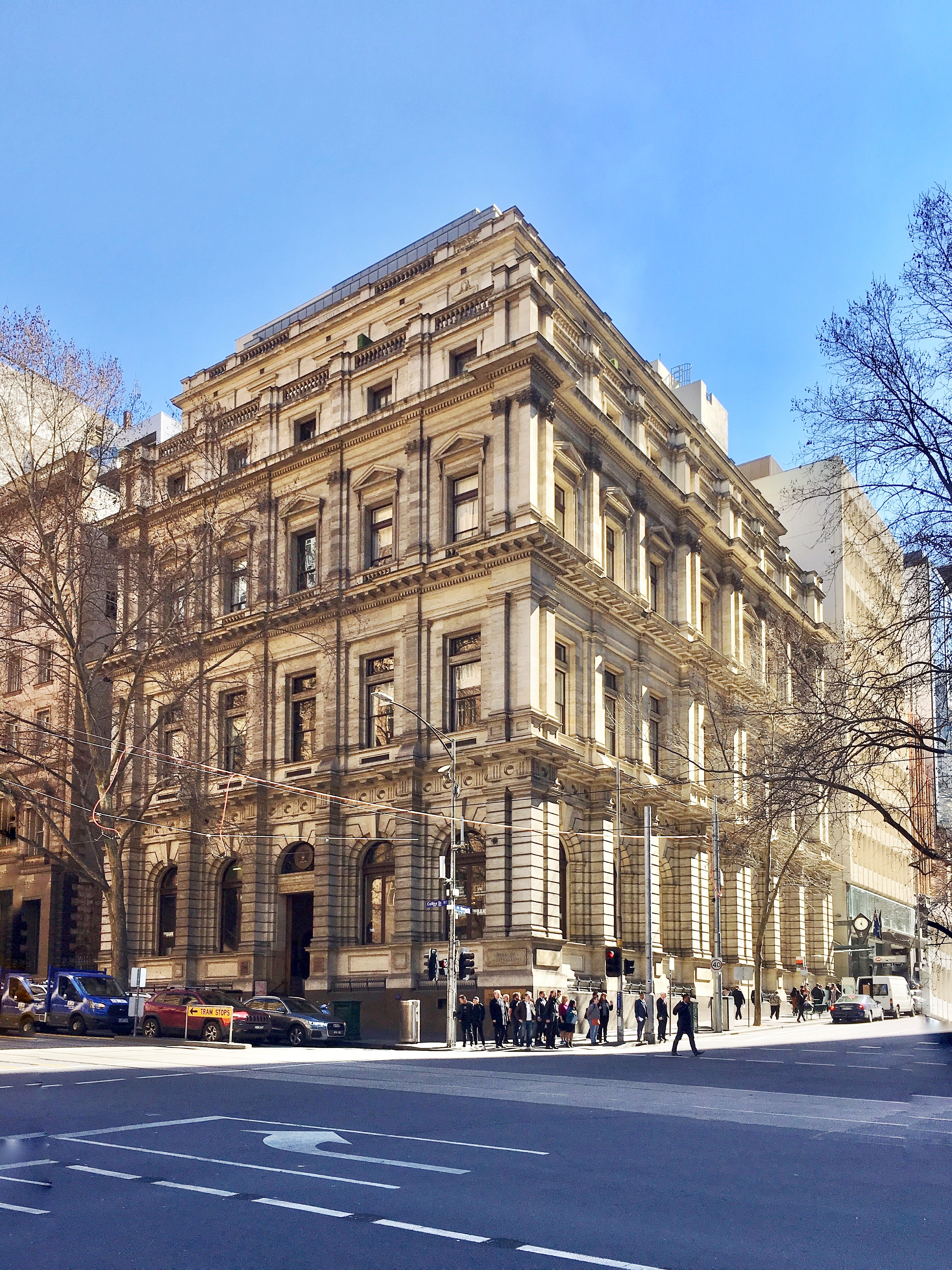
- View from Collins Street

General information
- Type: Bank building (1881–1874); Residential apartments (since 2013)
- Architectural style: Neoclassical
- Location: 394–398 Collins Street, Melbourne, Victoria, Australia
- Coordinates: 37°49′0.43″S 144°57′40.51″E
- Current tenants: Residential and Apartments at Melbourne
- Construction started: 1876
- Completed: 1881; 145 years ago
- Renovated: 1929, 1970

Design and construction
- Architects: Reed and Barnes

Renovating team
- Architect: A. K. Henderson (1929)

Victorian Heritage Register
- Official name: Former Bank of Australasia
- Type: Registered place
- Designated: 9 October 1974
- Reference no.: VHR H0033
- Heritage overlay no.: HO606
- Category: Commercial

Register of the National Estate
- Official name: Bank of Australasia (former)
- Type: Defunct register
- Designated: 21 March 1978
- Reference no.: 5001

The former Bank of Australasia Headquarters is a former bank headquarters building in Renaissance Revival style located on the corner of Queen Street and Collins Street, the traditional heart of Melbourne's financial precinct, with 19th-century banks on three corners.

The design is an amalgam of two periods, the first two floors built in 1875-6 designed by noted architects Reed & Barnes, with the top three floors added in matching style along with a new chamber in 1929–31, designed by A&K Henderson.

The Bank of Australasia merged with the Union Bank of Australia to form the Australia and New Zealand Banking Group in 1951, and the new bank sold the building in 1974. Since 2013 it has been a rental apartment building known as Treasury on Collins.

It was amongst the first buildings listed on the Victorian Heritage Register on 9 October 1974 in recognition of architectural and historical significance, and was added to the now defunct Register of the National Estate on 21 March 1978.

== Design ==
The history of this building is dominated by the fact that it was designed in two stages 55 years apart by two different architectural firms. The architects for the first stage, Reed & Barnes, designed a restrained two storey Renaissance Revival building, with a heavily rusticated ground floor, an ashlar upper floor, grouped corner pilasters, and a prominent cornice. The use of the Doric order expressed as square piers, creating a trabeated system superimposed over the arched windows, the whole being rusticated, creating an impression of strength and solidity, demonstrates the growth of the Victorian economy during the 1870s. Though only two floors, they were impressively tall, with the total height reaching 20.7 meters, over 890m2 area of land. The façade uses Oamaru free stone imported from New Zealand, on a base of local bluestone.

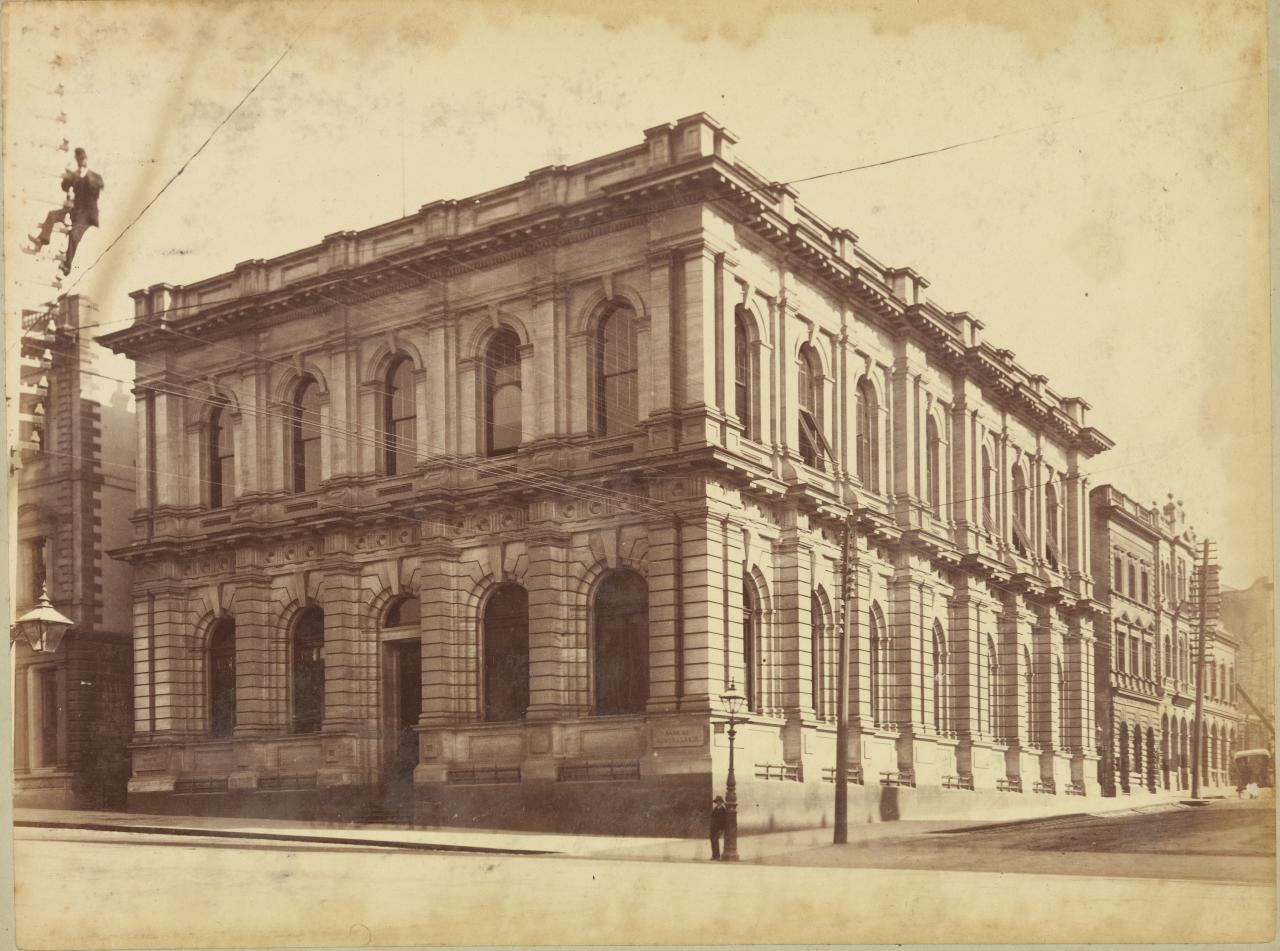
Original 1876 two-storey design by Reed & Barnes

The main entrance was on Collins Street, leading to a lofty banking chamber in the centre, with windows from a court on the west side, and main offices facing Queen Street. The basement was mainly occupied by the bank’s vault (strong rooms), while two smaller vaults were on the ground floor to help the daily business of the bank. Offices and rooms for the clerks occupied the top floor.

A major alteration took place in the boom years of the late 1920s, just before the great depression. The building area was multiplied by adding three extra storeys on top of the original two, a move not uncommon during that period, since the relatively low Victorian era buildings were often capable of supporting new floors, but the architecture was admired enough to retain it. The architects were A&K Henderson, chosen perhaps because the elder Anketell Henderson (who had died in 1922) had worked for Reed & Barnes when the original building was constructed. The additions also used Oamaru stone, and were designed to continue rather than radically change the original conception - the third storey was slightly shorter than the one below, the fourth level was conceived of as an attic level, and the fifth level was set back. A subtle change was making the first floor windows, which were arched like the ground floor, into square headed ones, with the new upper level having arched windows instead. The interior was completely rebuilt, with a light well through the centre of the building lighting a new board room on the second floor, and a skylit dome to a huge new banking chamber occupying almost the whole of the ground floor area, in restrained classical mode of fluted pilasters and columns with a surrounding mezzanine. Later renovations saw the light well filled in, and the addition of two intermediate floors between the first and second floor, and between the third and fourth floor, and finally another top floor in and conversion to an apartment-hotel in about 2001.

== Significance ==
The former Bank of Australasia is of architectural significance for its use of superimposed trabeated architectural systems and the groupings of pilasters at the corners, creating the impression of a classical three-dimensional presence, while only actually decorating two faces. The use of imported stone from New Zealand demonstrates the resources available and the ties the bank had in the 1870s. The 1929-31 additions are significant as a skilful solution to the problem of adding levels to an already complete classical design.

The former Bank of Australasia is of historical significance as the headquarters of a major banking company within Australia for nearly a century, from 1876 to 1974. It is significant for its position on a corner site within the centre of the banking precinct in Melbourne, which was the most important business centre at the time in Australia due to its growth and wealth. The architectural expression of the bank served as a metaphor for the impression the company wanted to send out to the community, an image of solidity and confidence. The layout of the banking chamber, the vaults, the board room and the managers office are of historical significance as they reflect the operations and hierarchy of a major banking headquarters. The 1929 boardroom is illustrative of the banking business culture from that period, and a rare example.

== Gallery ==
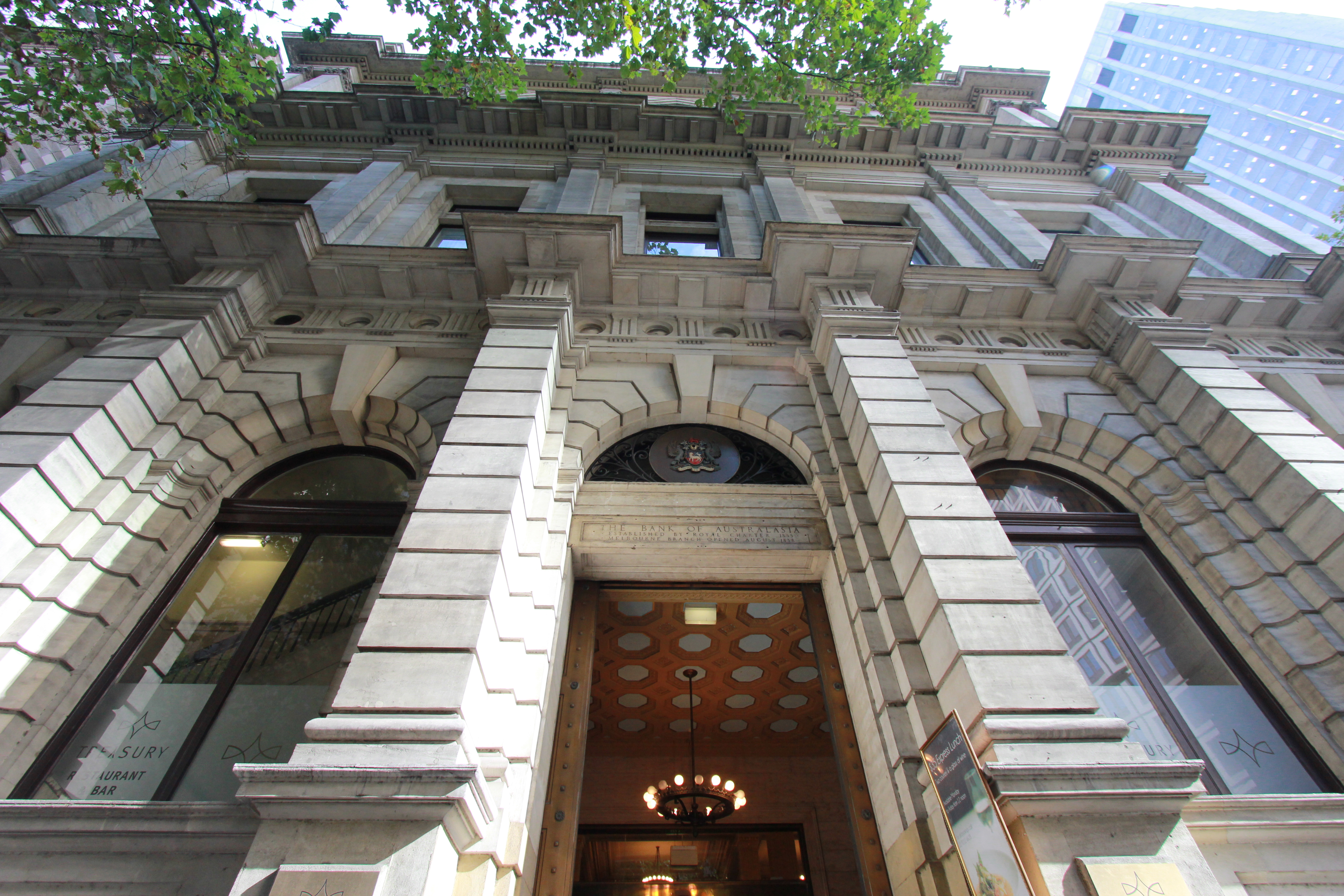
Entry from Collins Street.

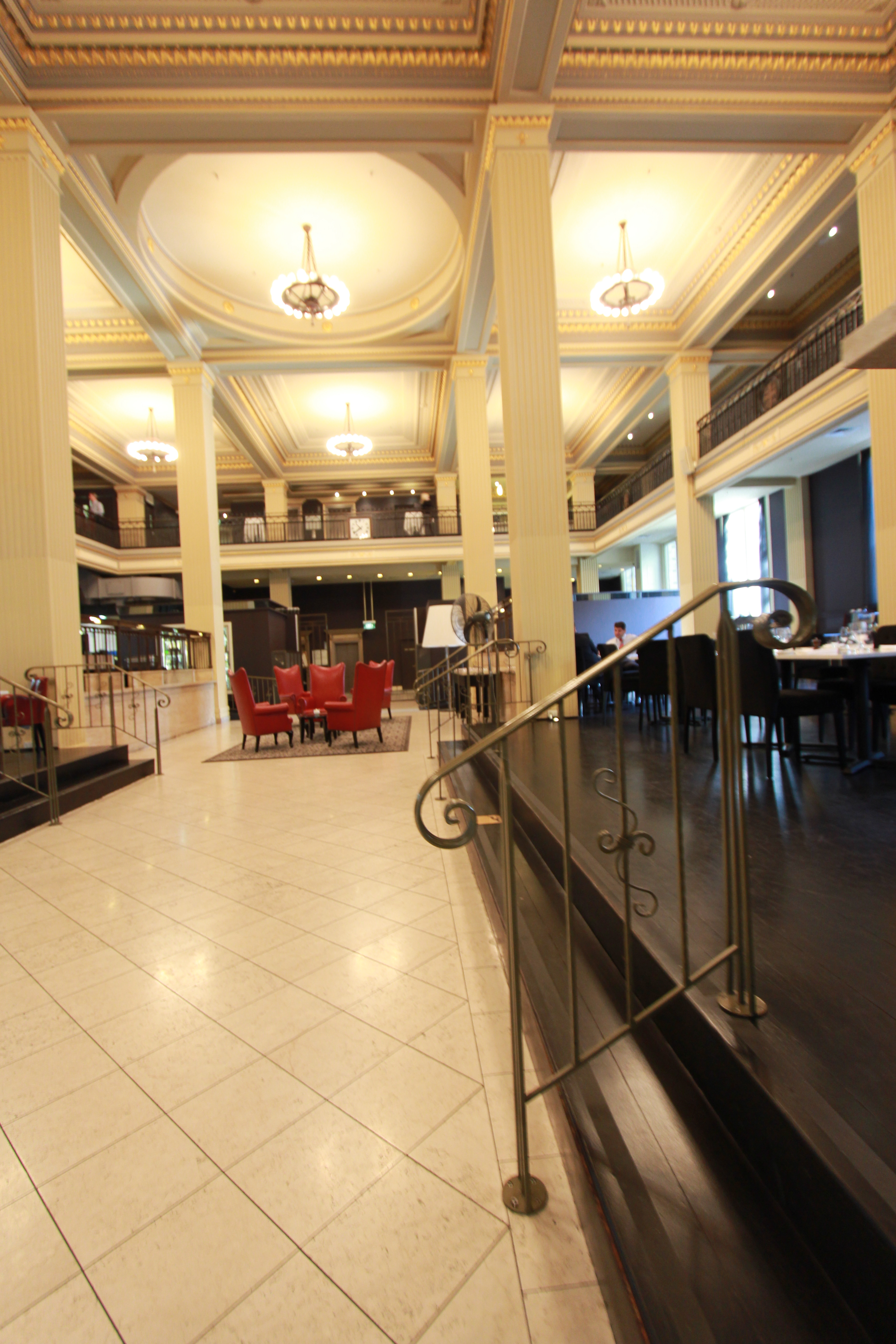
Ground level banking chamber, now restaurant and bar.

Location on the north west corner of Collins and Queen Streets.

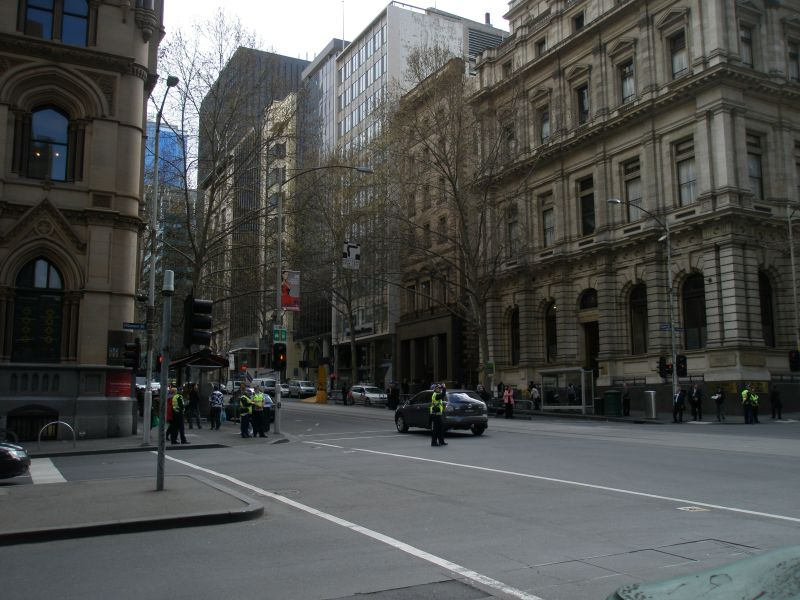
The building (far right) as seen from Queen Street

== See also ==
- Architecture of Melbourne
- List of places on the Victorian Heritage Register in the City of Melbourne
