= Lombard Building =

Coordinates: 37°49′6.5″S 144°57′43″E

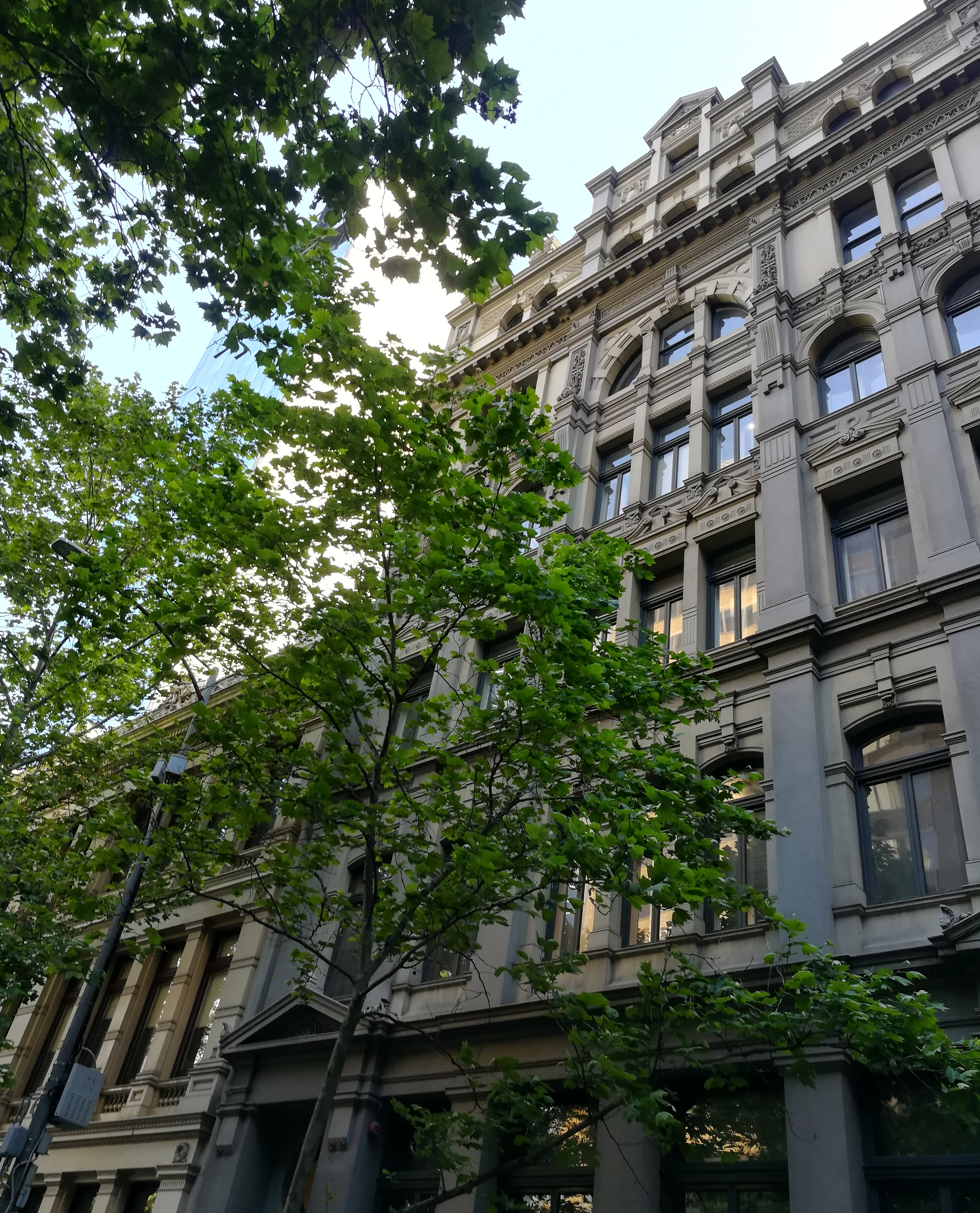
- The building viewed from street level

General information
- Location: 15-17 Queen Street, Melbourne, Victoria, Australia
- Completed: 1889–1890; 136 years ago;

Technical details
- Floor count: 7 floors (including basement level)
- Floor area: total area for leased office space 2373 m^{2};
- Lifts/elevators: 2

Design and construction
- Architects: Reed, Henderson + Smart
- Developer: H Lockington

The Lombard Building is a Victorian era building built between 1889 and 1890, within the Melbourne CBD in Victoria, Australia. It was designed by the architectural practice of Reed, Henderson & Smart (1883–1890), now known as Bates Smart. The building was built to house several office practices, which it still operates as today.

== History ==
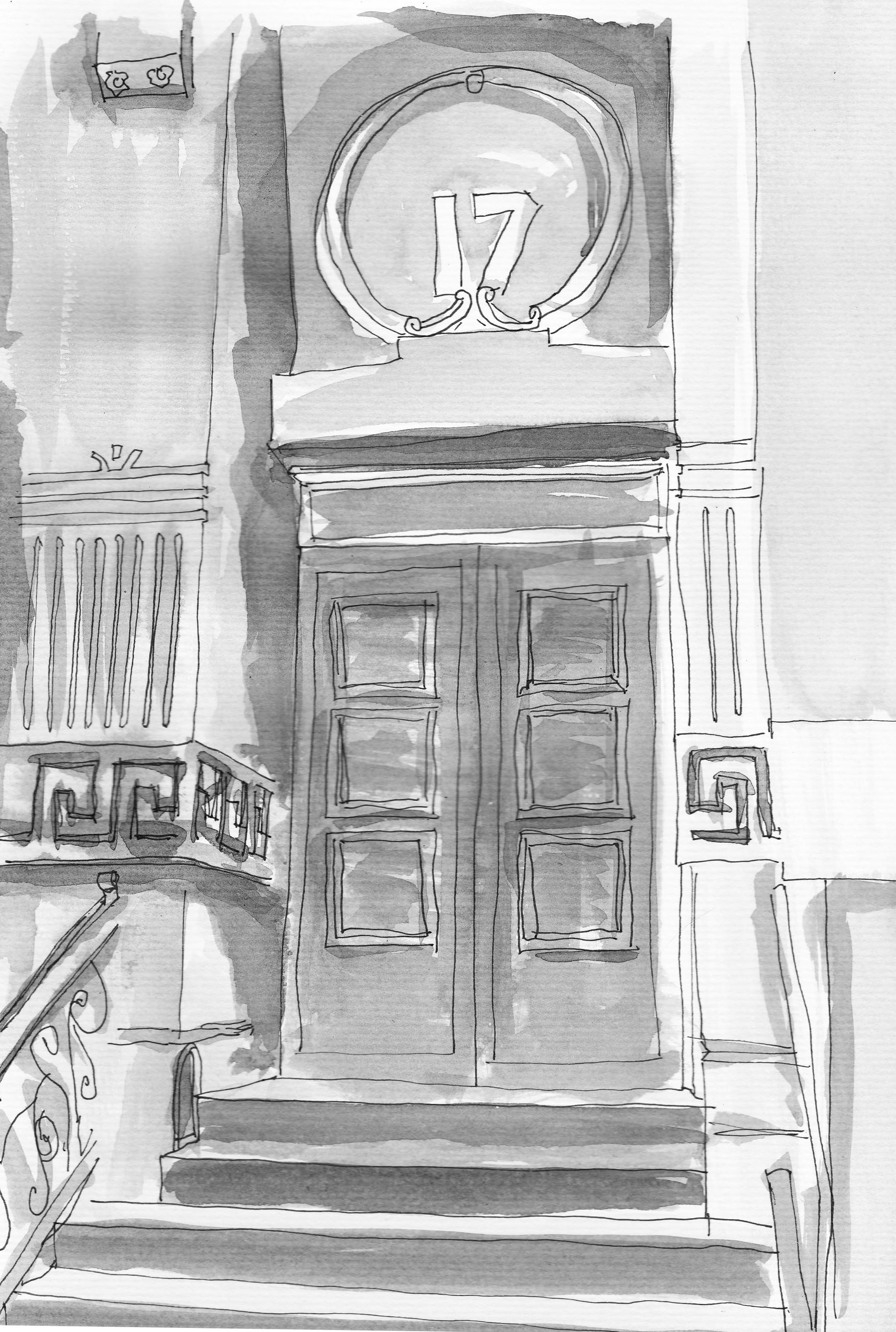
Sketch of the entrance to the Lombard Building from 17 Queen Street, Melbourne

Built between 1889 and 1890, the Lombard Building is a seven-storey office building including a basement level designed by the architecture firm at the time Reed, Henderson & Smart (Joseph Reed, Anketell Henderson & Francis Smart). Constructed for Balfour, Elliott & Co. the building was built in the Victorian era with a free classical style and sits on a Melbourne city block in Queen Street, . During its lifetime the building has changed hands and has been renovated many times.

In July 1957 the building was traded at a price tag of $204,000 and was renovated on the upper floors and the lower ground in 1981 and 1985. By July 1987 the traded price had already risen to a value of $2.7 million, and was bought by Swiss Reinsurance Australia Ltd for $5 million in April 1990. During this time the entire building was renovated at a cost of $7 million, which was the highest cost for the building so far. Eventually the building was sold to its current owner, Lombard House Pty Ltd for $9.3 million. The building is currently used to lease office space.

== Architecture ==
Built during the Victorian era, the building reflects the late boom style design where elements of the classical are arranged in a more free excessive way, hence being called free classical. The building sits on 15-17 Queen Street, Melbourne CBD with a site area of 590 m^{2} and has a frontage of 15.62 m. Built with 6 levels and a basement, the building reflects the Victorian era of skyscraper and is among the first buildings in Melbourne to have lifts. The floors are centered around two lifts and a central staircase, giving each level an approximate floor area of 350 m^{2} and a total approximate floor area of 2373 m^{2}.

The building is constructed of load-bearing brick walls with internal structural iron and a stucco façade. The façade is complex as the building was designed to reflect the wealth of its owners at the time through the free classical style incorporating elements of arched openings, pediments, pilasters, a Hellenistic frieze and a large Diocletian window. The indication of new Queen Anne Revival style is evident in the picturesque roofline with a pedimented parapet and bold flanking chimney stacks. As with many buildings at the time, the basement is hidden behind iron balustrading at the ground floor level. In 1926 an electric lift was installed adjacent to the original hydraulic lift.

== Occupants ==
List of current occupants within the Lombard Building:

- Lower Level 1 - Webber Design Structural Engineers
- Ground Level - Encoo
- Level 1 - Live Performance Australia & Peter Ryan Architects
- Level 2 - Godfrey Pembroke Financial Consultants Ltd, Portfolio and Wealth Management Pty Ltd & Johansson Solicitors
- Level 3 - Peter J Woodford Pty Ltd & AusBiotech
- Level 4 - Lion Selection Group (African and Asian Lion)
- Level 5 - LGR Telecommunications
- Level 6 - Great Vision Shipping & Tel Investment Trust

== Gallery ==
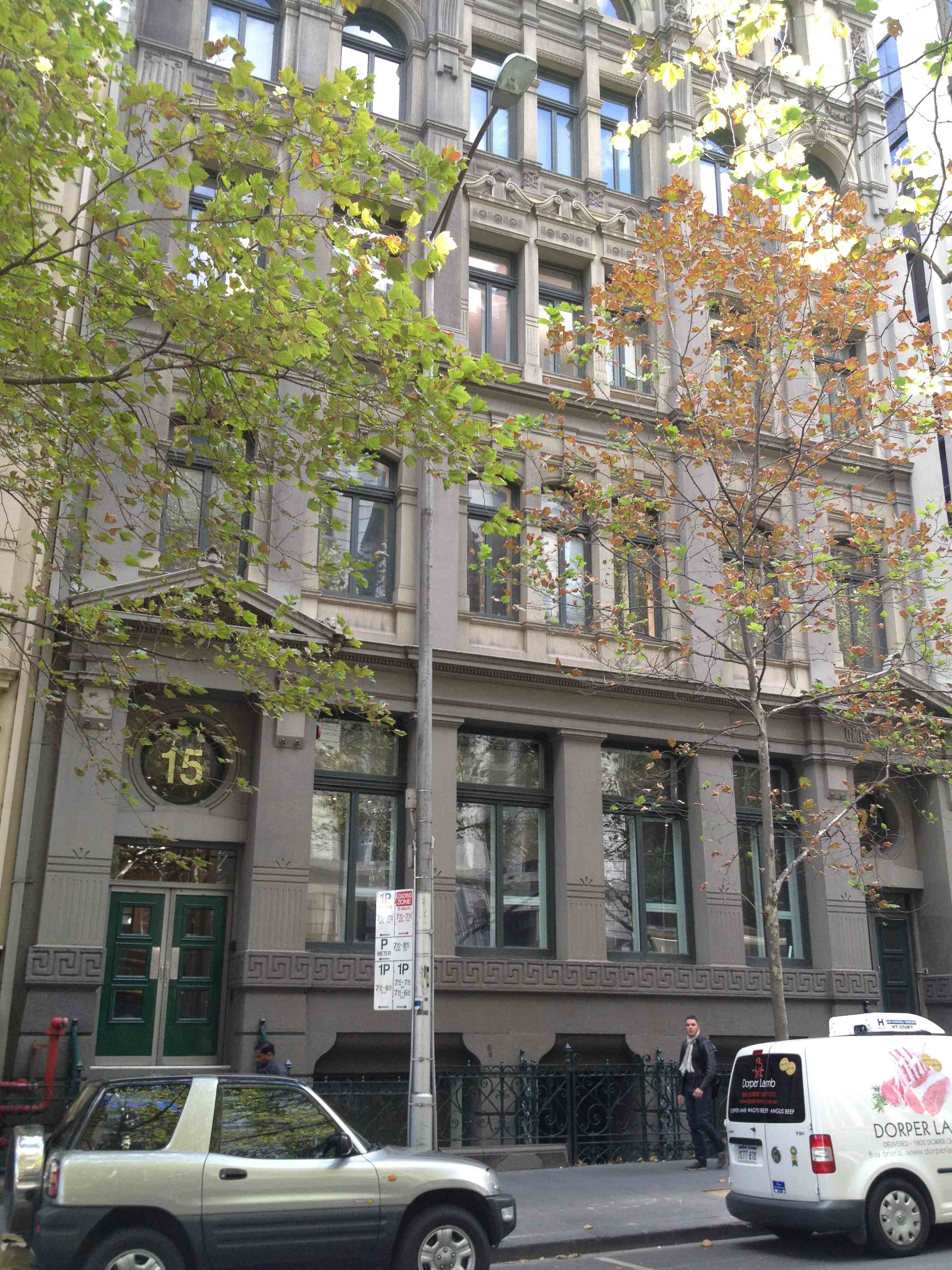
Street facade

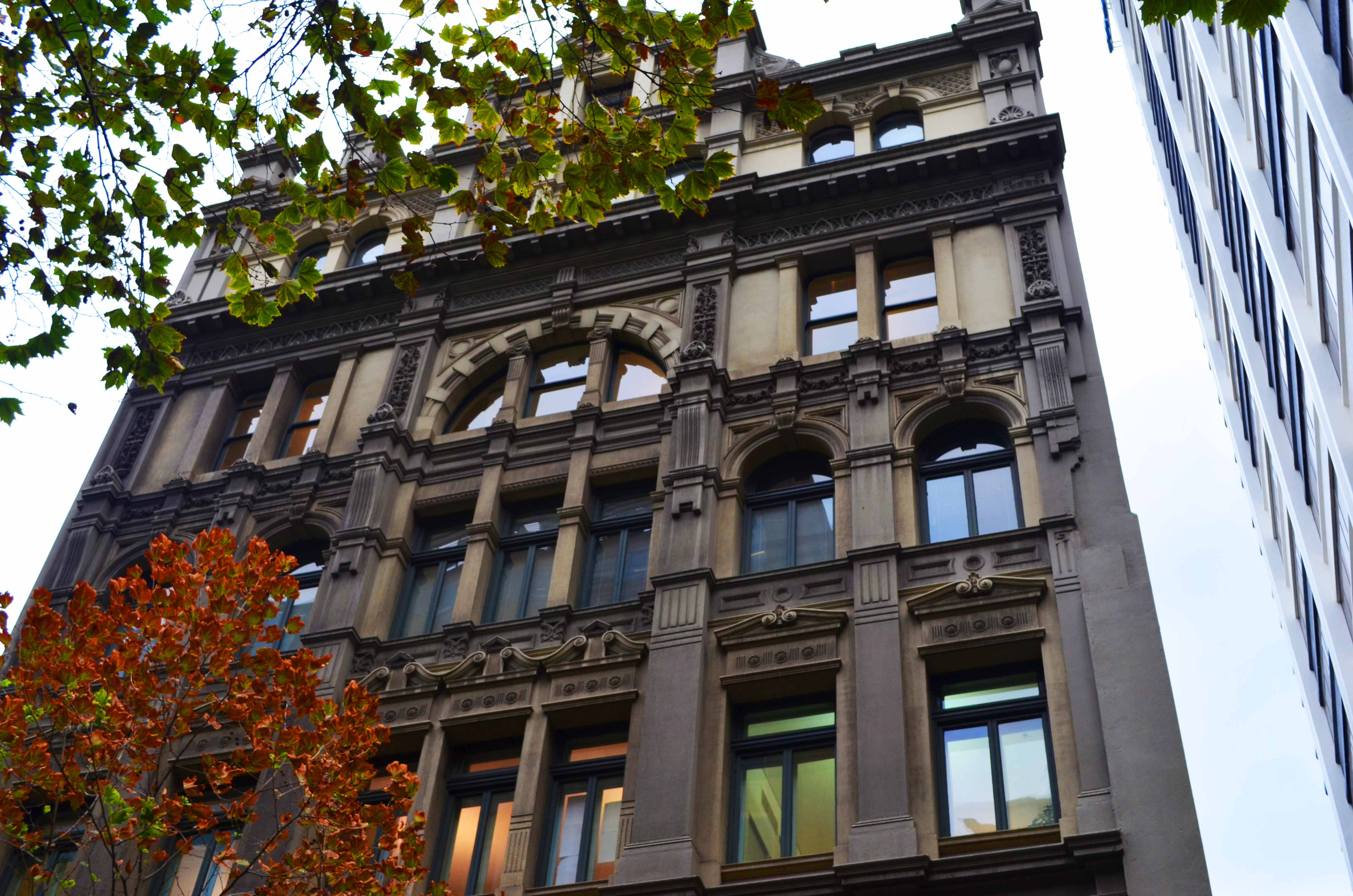
Upper façade

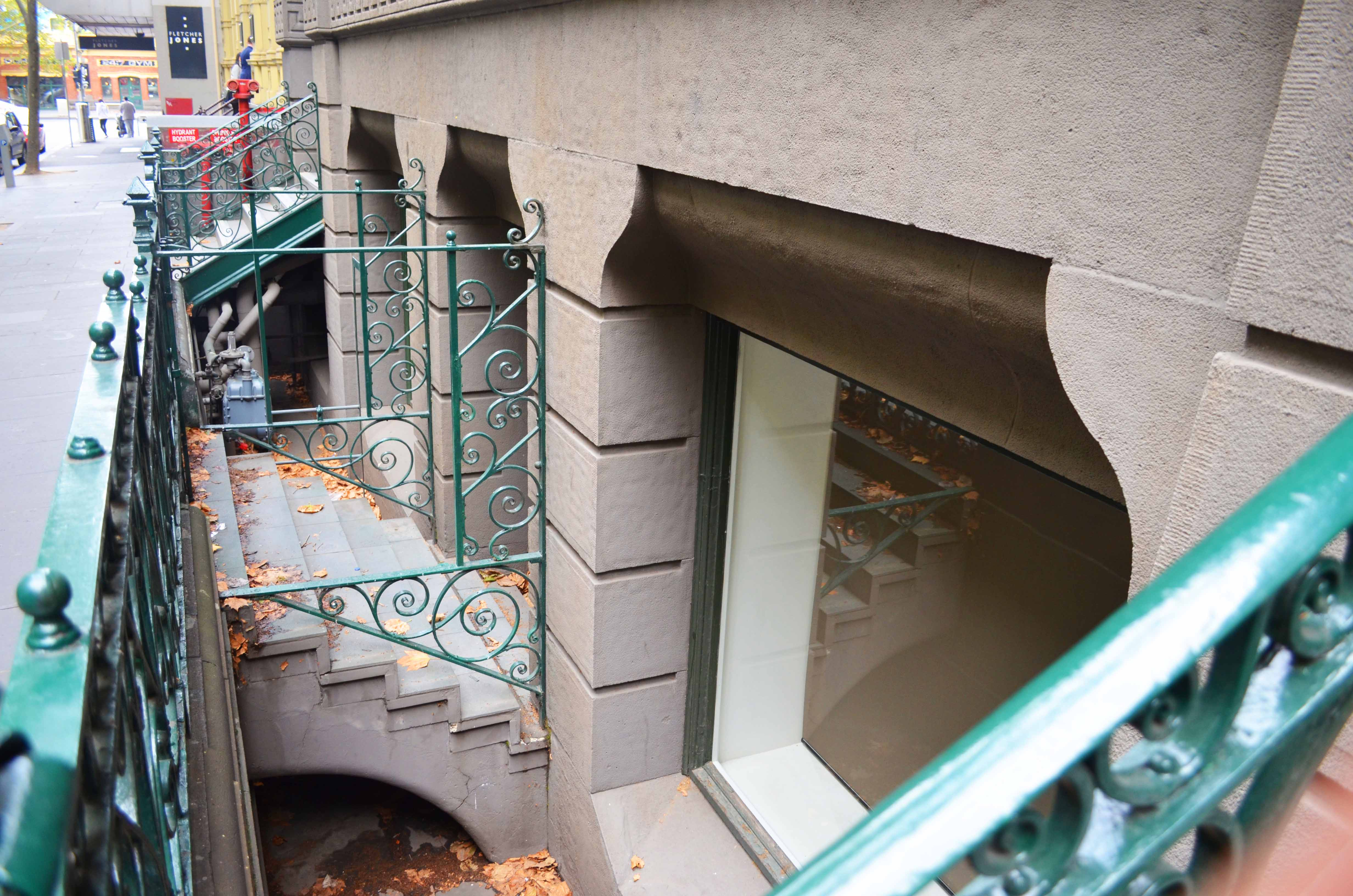
Melbourne Lombard building basement from outside

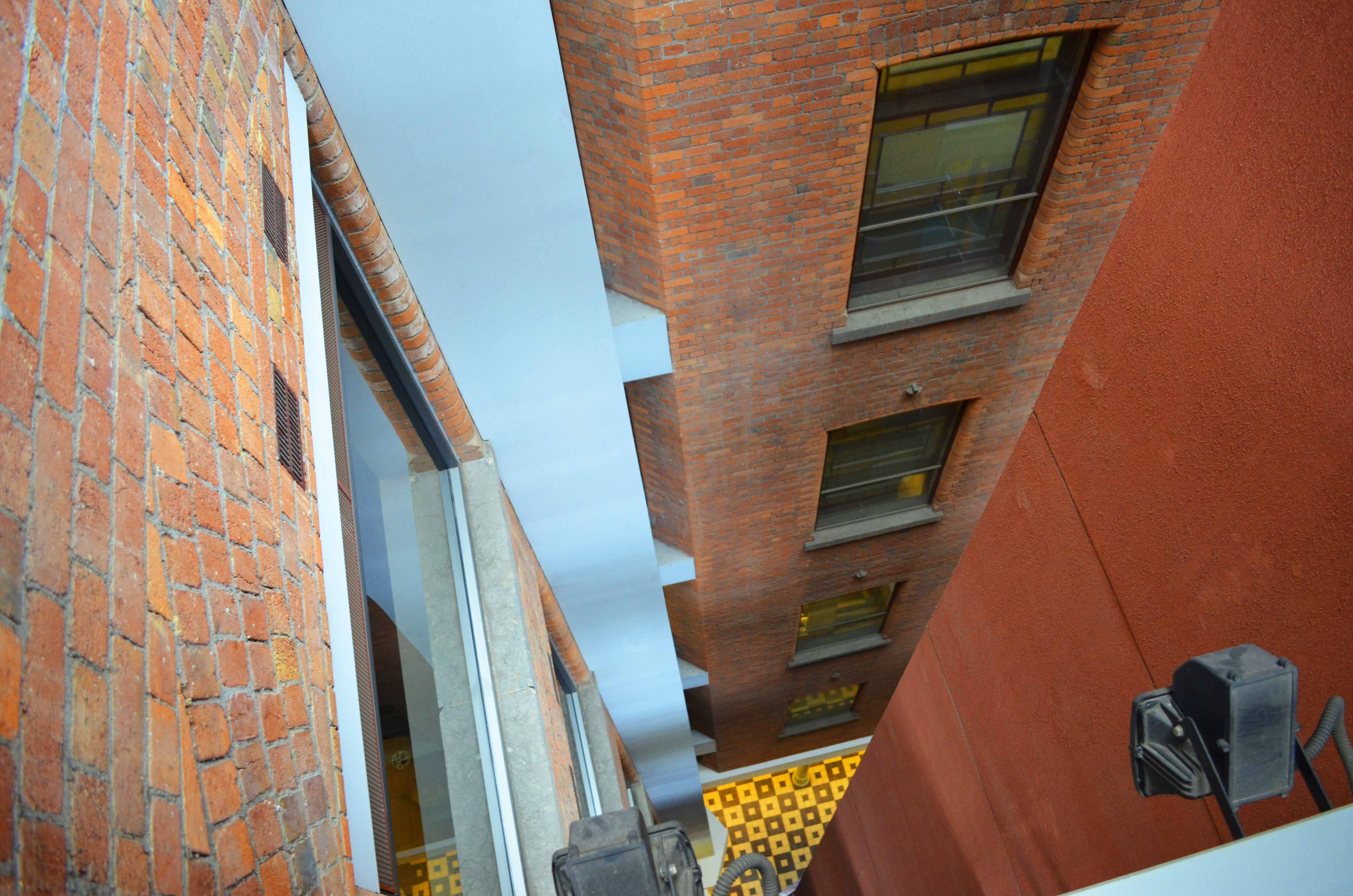
View from level 5 of the Lombard building looking down the atrium to the basement.

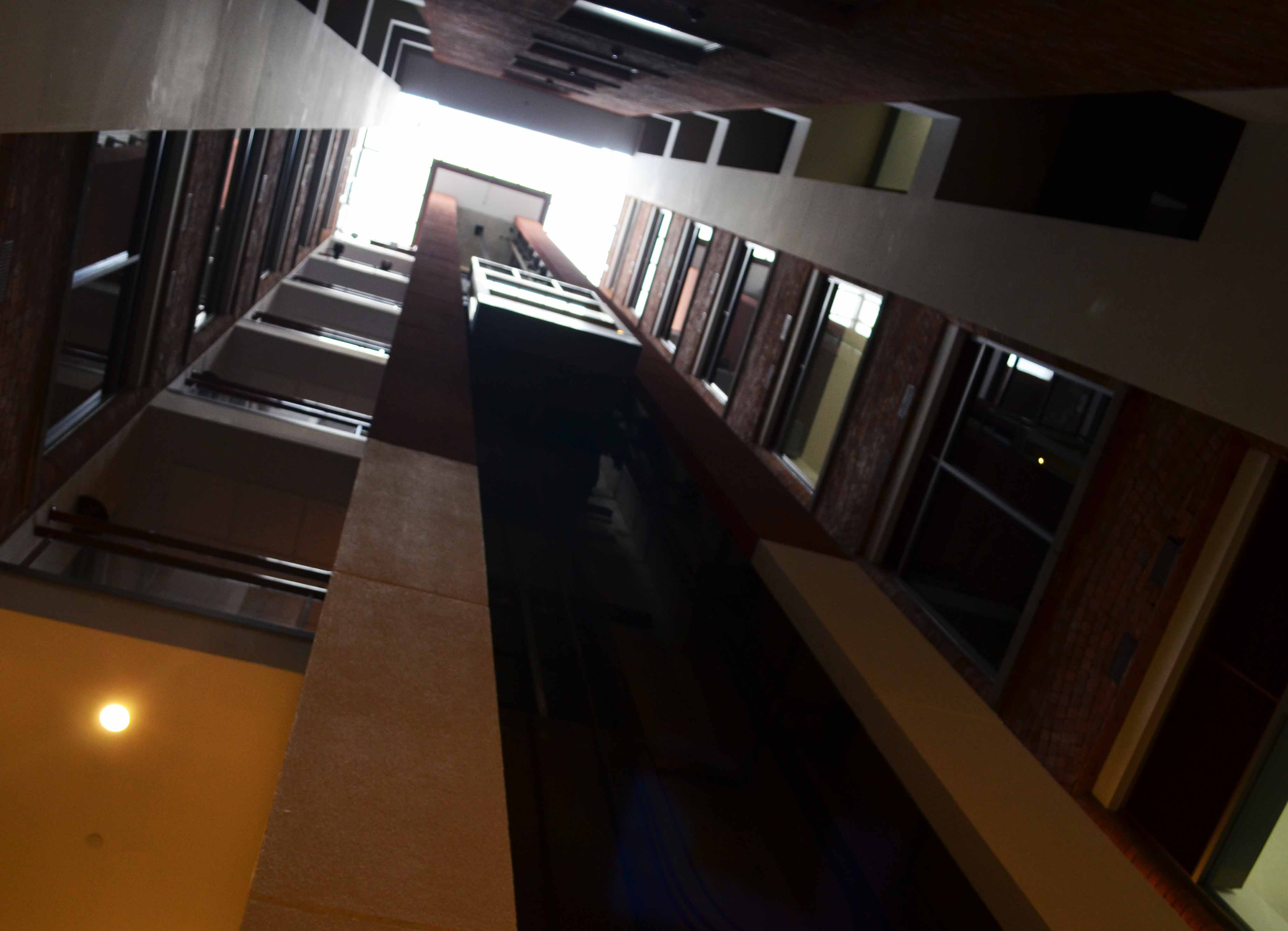
View from basement looking up the atrium between offices.

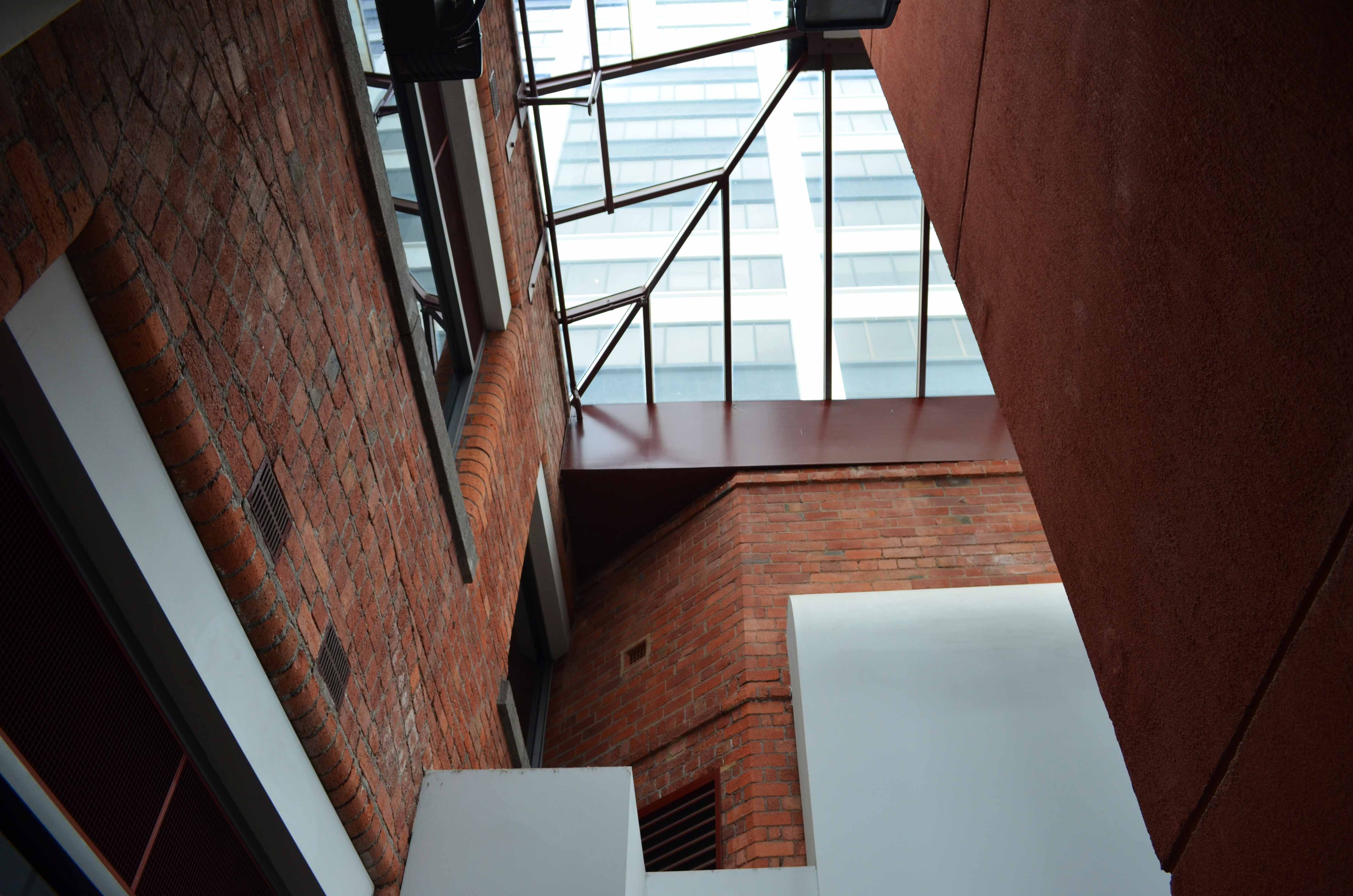
Closer view from level 05 of the top of the atrium with skylight.

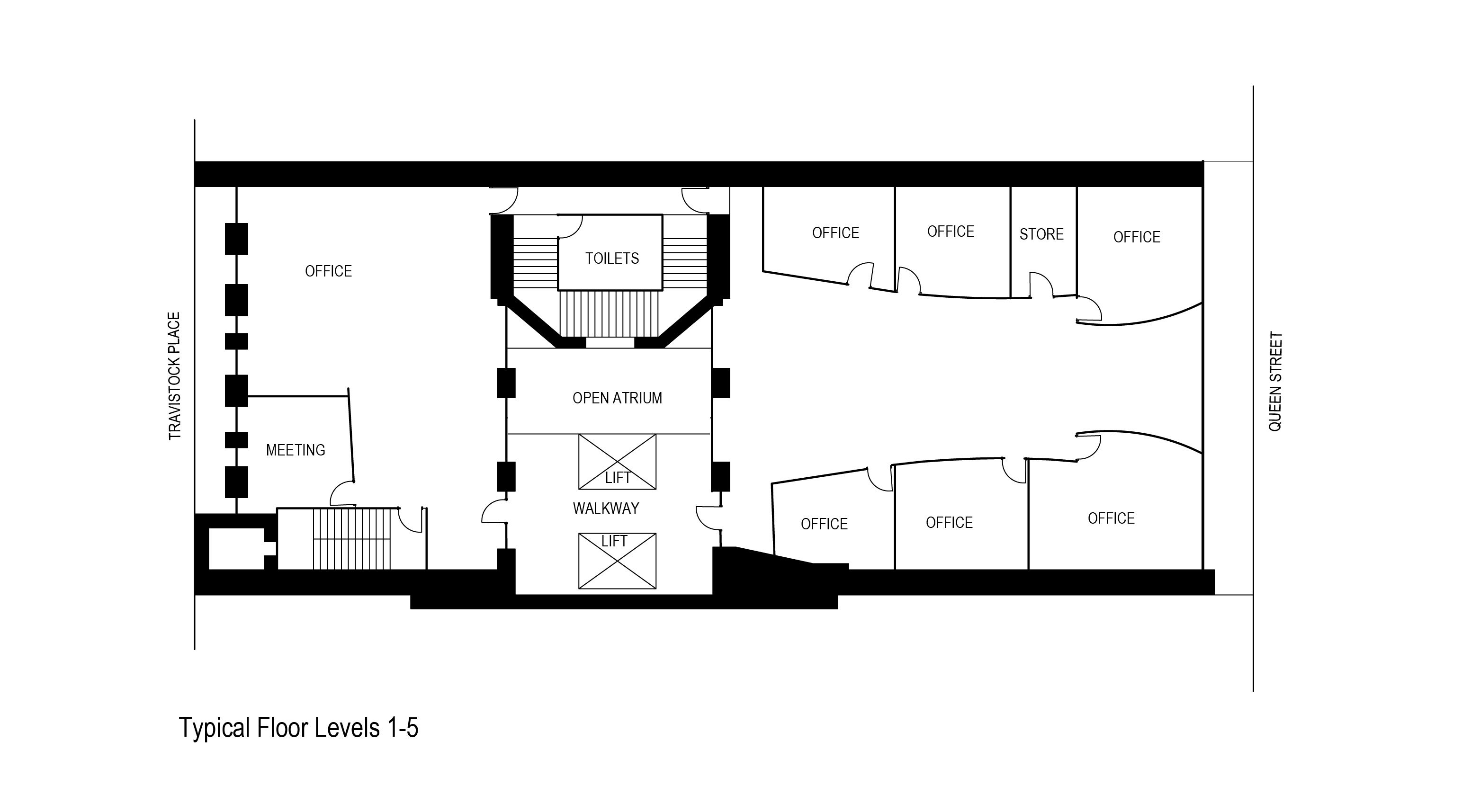
A basic floor plan of levels 1–5 in the Lombard building.

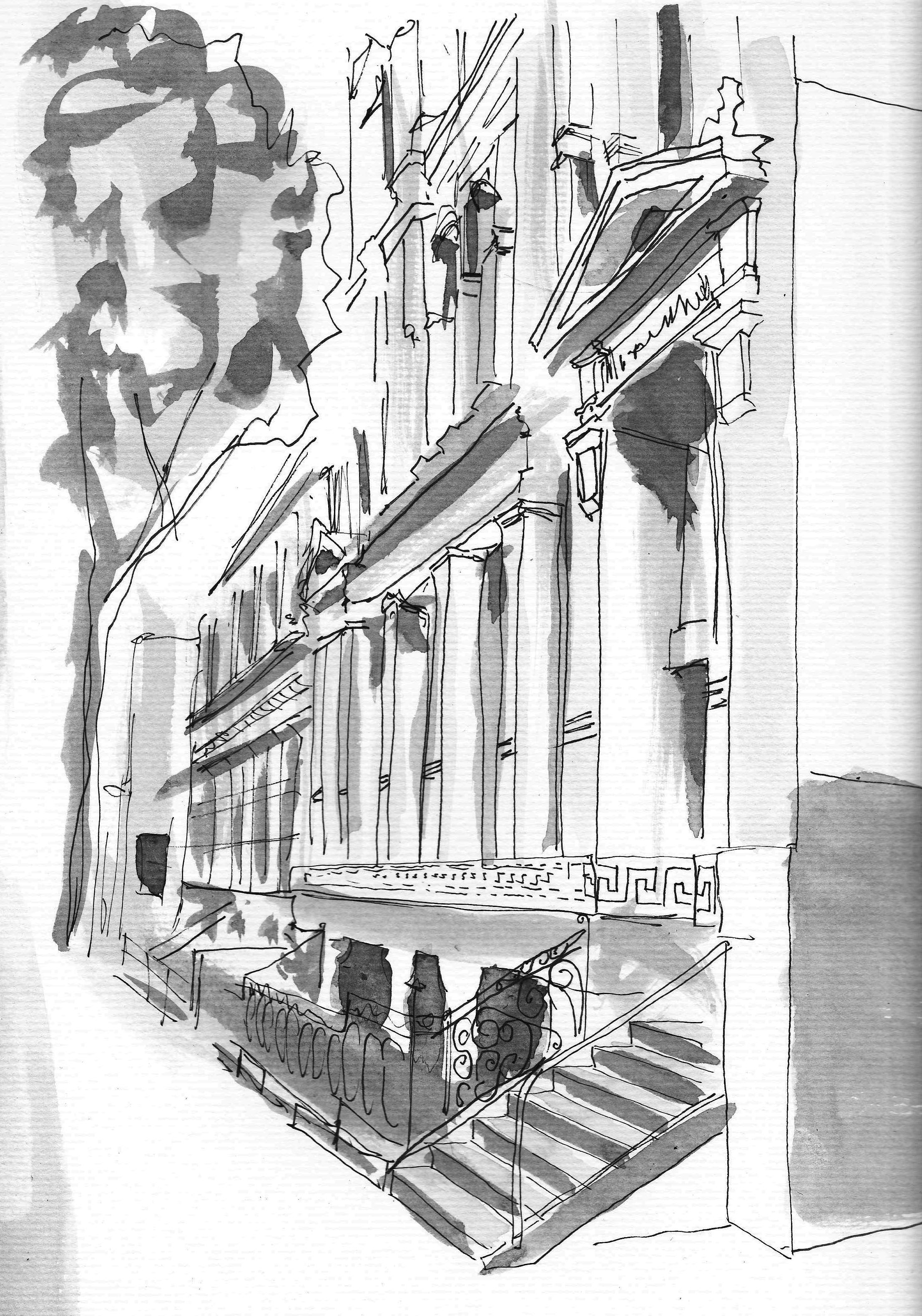
Perspective sketch of the Lombard Building from Queen Street Melbourne

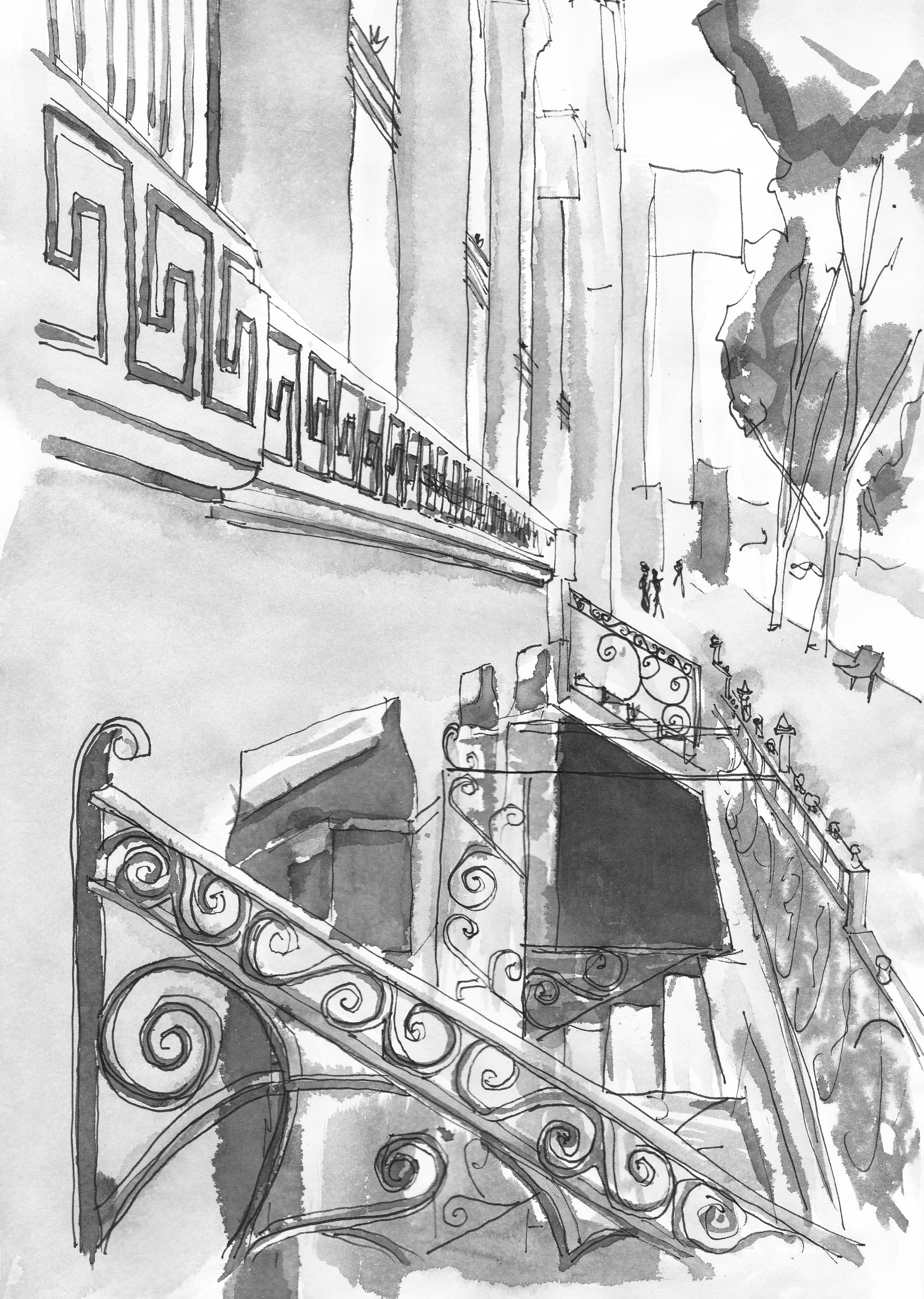
Perspective sketch of the Lombard Building from Queen Street Melbourne
