= Soldiers' Memorial Hall, Ipswich =

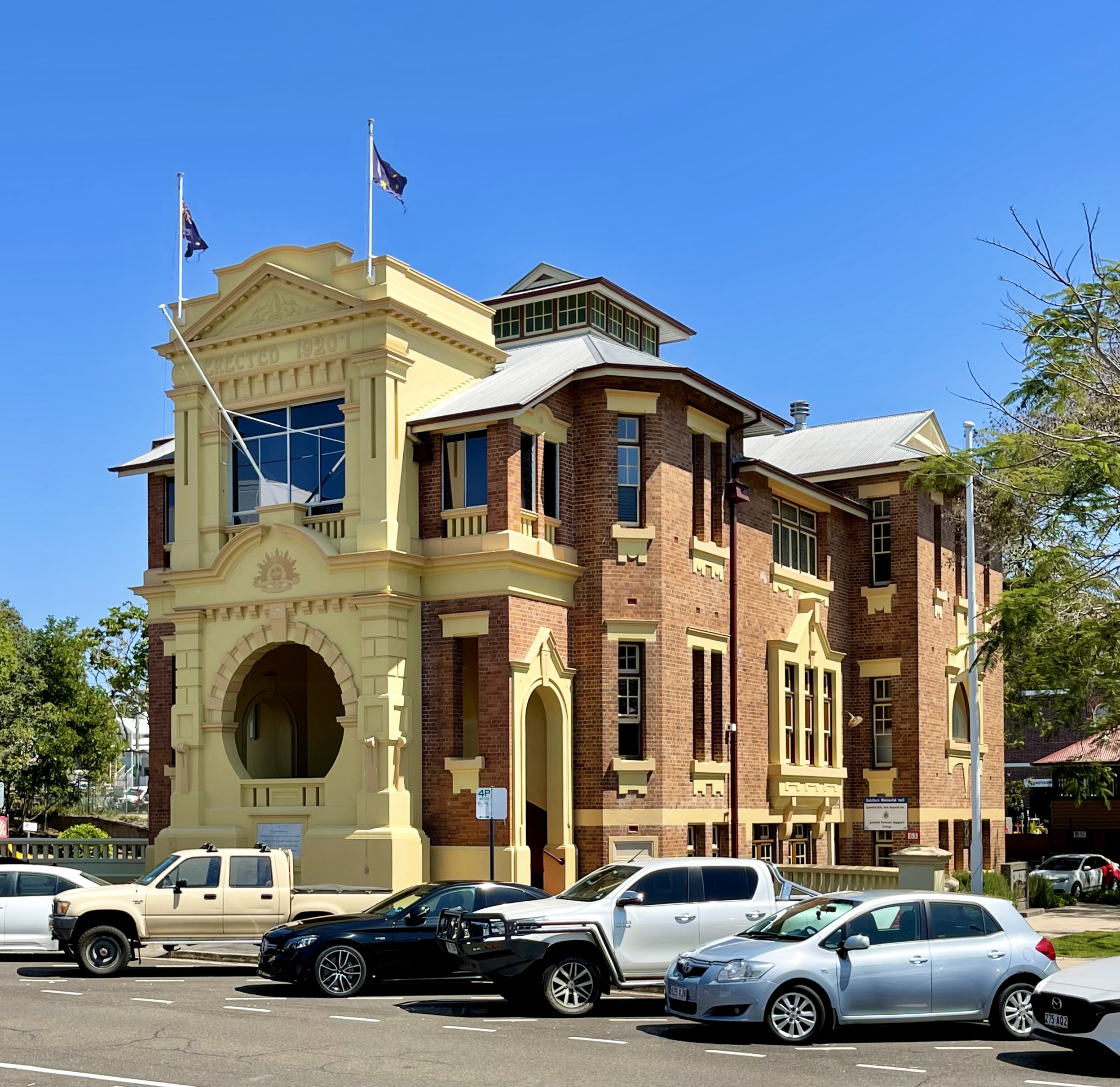
- Building in 2021

- Location within Queensland Location within Australia
- 27.6155°S 152.7583°E
- Location: 63 Nicholas Street, Ipswich, City of Ipswich, Queensland, Australia

History
- Design period: 1919–1930s (interwar period)
- Built: 1920–1921

Site notes
- Architect: George Brockwell Gill

Queensland Heritage Register
- Official name: Soldiers' Memorial Hall, Ipswich, Memorial Hall, Ipswich
- Type: state heritage (built)
- Designated: 21 October 1992
- Reference no.: 600592
- Significant period: 1920– (social); 1920–1986 (historical); 1920–1947 (fabric)
- Significant components: memorial – column, memorial – hall
- Builders: F. J. Lye

Soldiers' Memorial Hall is a heritage-listed community hall at 63 Nicholas Street, Ipswich, City of Ipswich, Queensland, Australia. It was designed by George Brockwell Gill and built by F.J. Lye from 1920 to 1921. It is also known as Memorial Hall. It was added to the Queensland Heritage Register on 21 October 1992.

== History ==
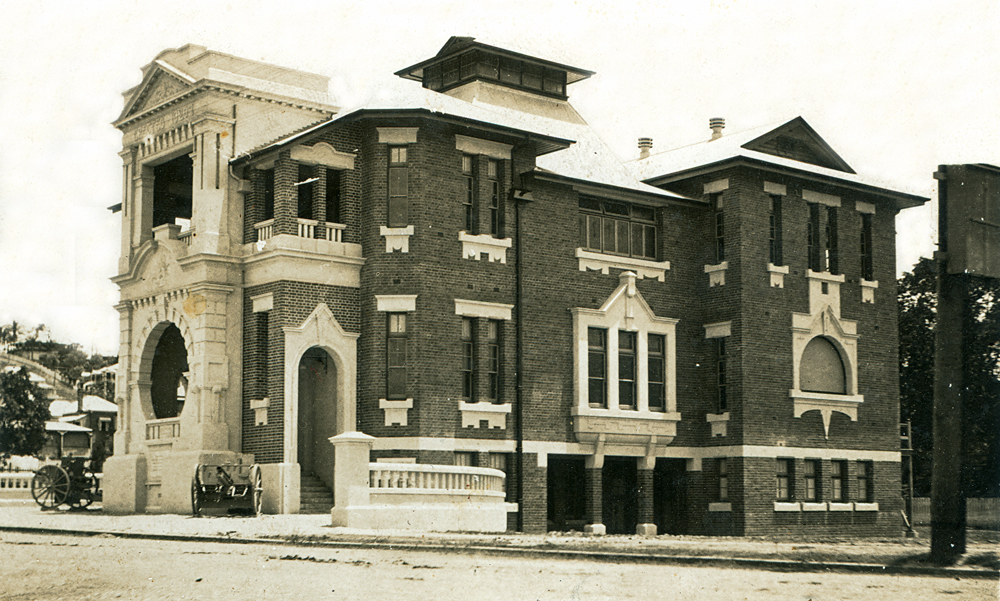
Soldiers Memorial Hall, Ipswich, circa 1920s

The Ipswich Soldiers' Memorial Hall is a three-storey brick building opened in 1921. It was designed by George Brockwell Gill and built by F.J. Lye. Brickwork was by A. Mansfield, plastering J. Jamieson and joinery Arthur Foote Ltd.

The Returned Soldiers and Sailors Imperial League of Australia (RSSILA) was formed in 1916 and a branch opened in Ipswich in September 1917. As the end of World War I approached in 1918, the Ipswich branch requested land suitable for a building which could be a recreation hall and war memorial. Land in the Central Gardens was provided by the Department of Lands and construction of the hall was funded by a £6000 loan to the council from the government, £1250 from the RSSILA and £500 from the Patriotic Committee. Further fundraising was carried out by community groups including Train Tea Ladies (a group which had met troop trains during the war), suburban Comforts Funds and Red Cross. The total cost of the building was £12000, representing a considerable community fundraising effort.

The foundation stone was laid in May 1920, coinciding with a visit by General Birdwood and the building was completed in November 1921.

During discussions with the RSSILA, Ipswich City Council had raised the possibility of combining the Memorial Hall with a new town hall for the city. Although this idea was rejected, a compromise was reached and the Ipswich School of Arts Library, managed by the council, was moved from the overcrowded Ipswich Town Hall to occupy the entire upper floor of the Memorial Hall; it remained there until 1947.

The basement level contained a billiards room, games room, refreshment room, showers and bath while the ground floor contained the memorial hall, assembly room, secretary's office and lounge.

Following the opening, further fundraising was carried out and a memorial window was commissioned for the upper floor. It was designed by William Bustard and carried out by R.S. Exton and Company, Brisbane under the supervision of C.H. Lancaster. The window was unveiled in November 1922. When a new RSL Services Club was built at North Ipswich in 1979, the window was removed to the new premises.

The building has been a popular venue for many community organisations including billiards club, dancing classes, dances, Red Cross Blood Bank and the Bush Book Club. During World War II, a temporary "All Services Hut" was erected in the park adjacent to the hall to serve as a recreation venue for servicemen; it was removed at the end of the war.

The Memorial Hall is used as the headquarters of the Ipswich sub-branch of the RSL and as meeting rooms for the RSL Women's Auxiliary, Legacy and other service organisations. It is the focal point of annual Anzac Day ceremonies in Ipswich.

Two additional monuments have been erected in the gardens to the north of the hall - a general memorial in grey granite dedicated in 1986 and a column in grey granite erected by the Incapacitated Service Men's and Women's Association to honour service in all wars, specifically including Borneo and Vietnam. Both were carved by sculptor Tom Farrell.

== Description ==
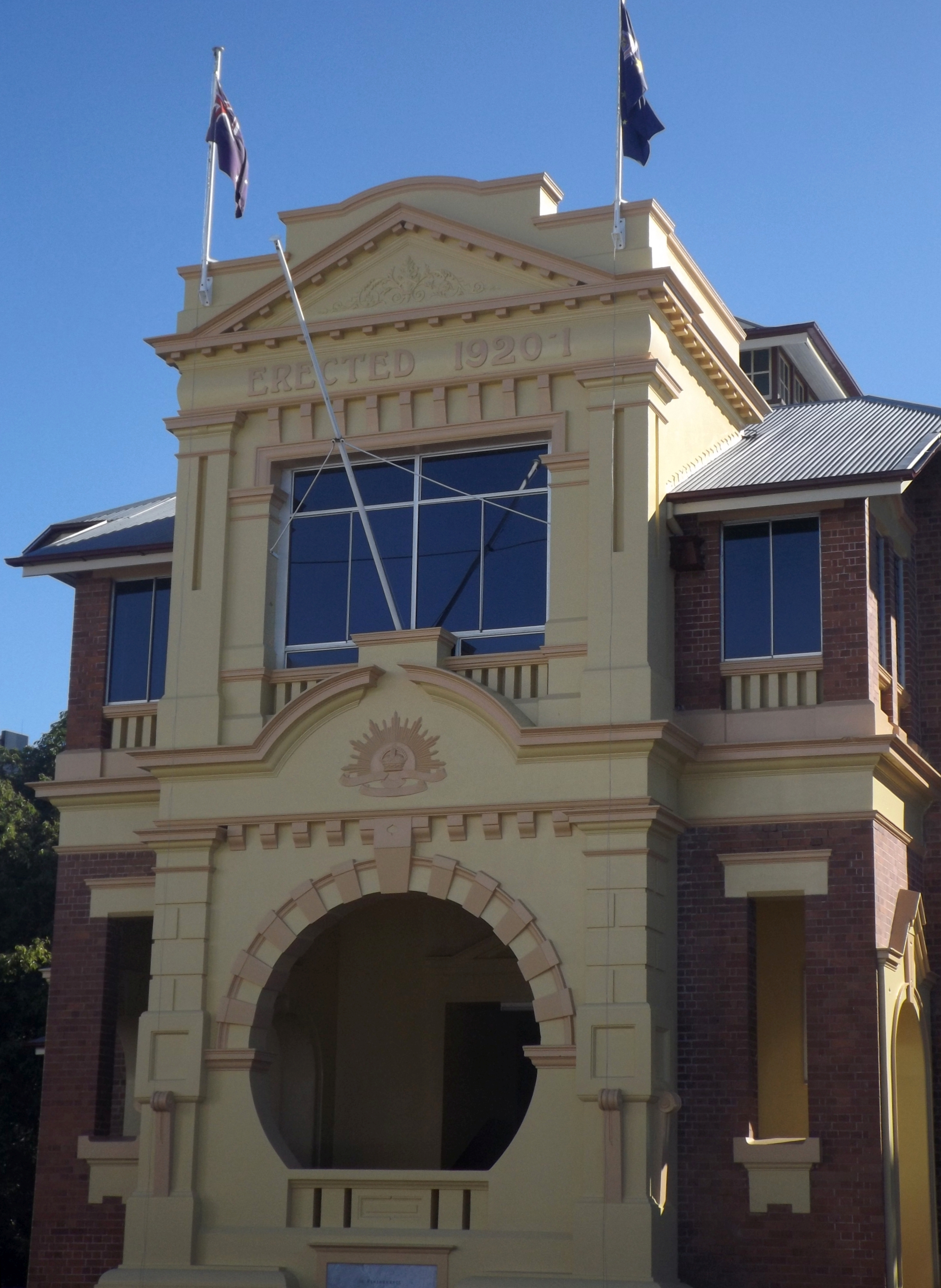
Front of the building, 2016

The building contains three levels - basement, ground and first floors constructed of load bearing brickwork and timber floor framing, and stands prominently within a small central city park.

The elaborate pedimented front pavilion of the building is surmounted by a formal raised parapet which together with the rusticated voussoirs, projecting cornice, pilasters, and rising sun motif, give the front of the building an impressive street presence. To give further emphasis to the front, this pavilion is constructed with slightly-contrasting coloured tuck-pointed brickwork.

The entrance portico is approached by flanking balustrade quadrant walls at street level, with stairs leading up to the ground floor. The memorial chamber immediately inside the entrance holds the original marble World War I memorial and a series of timber honour boards for later wars. Several honour boards relocated from other places in Ipswich have also been installed within the building.

The memorial chamber was originally naturally lit from above through a large rooftop lantern and central light well with encircling gallery at first floor level; this is now closed over.

The ground floor also contains the former Assembly Room, Lounge and offices. A silky oak timber staircase leads down to the basement which contains meeting rooms and an office and has a separate entrance on the northern side from the adjacent park. The upper level, reached by a silky oak staircase, contains a variety of meeting rooms. The main meeting room features a large semi-circular window, originally the location of a stained and coloured glass memorial now removed.

The internal detailing of the building is not elaborate, and includes silky oak joinery, painted plasterwork and ceilings of fibreboard with geometrically placed cover battens.

A rear fire escape constructed of structural steel serves the ground and first floor levels.

The roof is a series of hipped and gabled corrugated iron roof forms with a central raised roof over the lantern light.

The adjacent park contains two granite memorials.

== Heritage listing ==
Soldiers' Memorial Hall, Ipswich was listed on the Queensland Heritage Register on 21 October 1992 having satisfied the following criteria.

The place is important in demonstrating the evolution or pattern of Queensland's history.

The Memorial Hall Ipswich, built in 1920–21, demonstrates the patriotic fervour associated with World War I and the community's identification with the goals of the "mother country" Britain at this period in Queensland's history.

The place demonstrates rare, uncommon or endangered aspects of Queensland's cultural heritage.

It is a rare example of a very substantial brick soldiers' hall. The interior is generally intact and with the trend towards conversion of the larger halls for service clubs with poker machines, this is becoming rare.

The place is important in demonstrating the principal characteristics of a particular class of cultural places.

The Memorial Hall with its honour chamber, memorial tablets, meeting rooms, recreation rooms and offices demonstrates the characteristics and use of a hall for returned soldiers.

The place is important because of its aesthetic significance.

The building is valued by the Ipswich community for its contribution to the townscape of the Ipswich CBD, and demonstrates a high standard of aesthetic design consistent with its civic and patriotic purposes.

The place has a strong or special association with a particular community or cultural group for social, cultural or spiritual reasons.

Since 1920, the Memorial Hall has had a special association with the RSL and with various allied groups such as Legacy, Women's Auxiliary and War Widows. It has a strong spiritual and social association with the general community and returned service personnel as the focal point for Anzac and Remembrance Day commemorations. It has strong associations with the wider community because of its use for other purposes such as the city library, blood bank and as a place for meetings and social events.

The place has a special association with the life or work of a particular person, group or organisation of importance in Queensland's history.

The design of the building is the work of recognised local architect George Brockwell Gill and is a fine and typical example of his style at this period.
