= Bates Smart =

Architectural firm based in Melbourne, Australia

Practice information
- Founders: Joseph Reed; Frederick Barnes; E. A. Bates; C. P. Smart; W. O. McCutcheon
- Founded: 1862; 164 years ago
- Location: Melbourne, Victoria, Australia

Significant works and honors
- Buildings: State Library of Victoria (1854); Melbourne Town Hall (1870); Royal Exhibition Building (1879); Federation Square (2000); Crown Casino Metropol (2009)
- Awards: RAIA Walter Burley Griffin Award for Urban Design (2003, 2005); RAIA National Award for Interior Architecture (2003)

Website
- batessmart.com

Bates Smart is an Australian architectural firm with studios in Melbourne and Sydney, and previously also in Brisbane. Founded by Joseph Reed when he formed a partnership with Frederick Barnes in 1862, it is one of Australia's oldest architectural firms. Over the decades, the firm's practices involving architecture, interior design, urban design, strategy, sustainability and research, were responsible for some of Australia’s most recognisable buildings.

== History ==
Joseph Reed, born in 1823 in Cornwall, England, established his own practice upon his arrival in Melbourne in 1853. In 1862, Reed entered into a partnership with Frederick Barnes, a British architect, and renamed his practice to Reed & Barnes. Since 1862, the firm's name has linked to many of the major buildings of nineteenth-century Melbourne, including the Melbourne Town Hall, Rippon Lea, and the Scots Church. The Melbourne International Exhibition building, added to the World Heritage List, is one of the most notable buildings to be completed by the firm.

In 1883 Barnes retired, and A. Henderson and Francis Smart joined Joseph Reed as partners to create Reed, Henderson & Smart. In 1890 Reed died, Henderson withdrew, and William Tappin joined, creating Reed Smart & Tappin. In 1907, N. G. Peebles joined, creating Smart Tappin & Peebles; however, with the rapid departure of Tappin, and addition of E. A. Bates, the firm became known as Bates Pebble & Smart the following year. After Peebles died in 1923, the firm became Bates Smart McCutcheon in 1926 when Osborn McCutcheon became a partner; he remained principal partner until his retirement. Since 1995 the firm has been known as Bates Smart.

The current directors are Matthew Allen, Julian Anderson, Jeffery Copolov, Cian Davis, Mark Healey, Guy Lake, Mathieu le Sueur, Kellie Payne, Brenton Smith, Philip Vivian and Karen Wong.

== Notable projects ==
The following buildings were designed in the partnership that Reed formed with Barnes in 1862 and its subsequent reincarnations to form Bates Smart in 1995. For the notable works completed by Reed, as a sole practitioner, see notable works of Joseph Reed.

Project name	Image	Date	Location (Note: All are located in Victoria, Australia, unless stated otherwise.)	Description and awards	Notes
Joseph Reed (1853)
See notable works of Joseph Reed
Reed & Barnes (1862)
Independent Church		1866	122–136 Collins St, Melbourne	Known as St Michael's Uniting Church; added to the Victorian Heritage Register	
Melbourne Town Hall and Administration Building		1867	90–130 Swanston St, Melbourne	Added to the Victorian Heritage Register	
Rippon Lea		1869	192 Hotham St, Elsternwick	Added to the Victorian Heritage Register	
Exhibition Boot Factory; (later addition as the Cathedral Hall)		1873	20–22 Brunswick St, Fitzroy	Factory designed by Reed & Barnes; Cathedral Hall (now known as Central Hall) by Reed, Smart & Tappin in 1904; added to the Victorian Heritage Register	
Melbourne Trades Hall		1874	2–40 Lygon St, Carlton	Added to the Australian National Heritage List and the Victorian Heritage Register	
Scots' Church		1874	140–150 Collins St, Melbourne	Added to the Victorian Heritage Register	
Faraday Street School (now known as the Kathleen Syme Education Centre)		1876	251 Faraday St, Carlton	Added to the Victorian Heritage Register	
Bank of Australasia, Ipswich		1878	16A Brisbane St, Ipswich, Queensland	Added to the Queensland Heritage Register	
Melbourne International Exhibition Building		1880	Carlton Gardens, Carlton, Melbourne	Added to the World Heritage List and the Victorian Heritage Register	
Bank of Australasia (former headquarters)		1881	394–398 Collins St, Melbourne	Added to the Victorian Heritage Register (altered in 1929 and 1970 by others)	
Ormond College		1881	University of Melbourne, Parkville	Added to the Victorian Heritage Register	
Wilson Hall		1882	University of Melbourne, Parkville	Destroyed by fire in 1952; replaced by 1956 building (see below)	
Reed Henderson & Smart (1883)
Sacred Heart Church complex, St Kilda		1884	83–87 Grey St, St Kilda	Added to the Victorian Heritage Register	
Old Pathology Building		1885	University of Melbourne, Parkville	Added to the Victorian Heritage Register	
Myoora		1887	405–411 Alma Rd, Caulfield North	Added to the Victorian Heritage Register	
Christ Church, South Yarra		1887	683–701 Punt Rd, South Yarra	North aisle only; added to the Victorian Heritage Register	
Queenscliff Hotel		1887	16 Gellibrand St, Queenscliff	Added to the Victorian Heritage Register	
Baldwin Spencer Building (Old Zoology building, also called Building 113)		1888	University of Melbourne, Parkville	Added to the Victorian Heritage Register (excluding the 1963 west wing and 2011 additions)	
Old Physics Conference Room and Gallery		1888	University of Melbourne, Parkville	Added to the Victorian Heritage Register	
Lombard Building		1889	15–17 Queen St, Melbourne	Added to the Victorian Heritage Register (exterior fabric only)	
Reed Smart & Tappin (1890)
The Chalet		1890	14 Glenisla Dr, Mount Martha	Added to the Victorian Heritage Register	
Edzell		1892	76 St Georges Rd, Toorak	Expanded in 1917 and altered in 1935 to different architects; added to the Victorian Heritage Register	
Sacred Heart Cathedral		1896	80 Wattle St, Bendigo	Added to the Victorian Heritage Register	
Our Lady of Sacred Heart Catholic Church complex, Carlton		1897	199 Rathdowne St, Carlton	Presbytery only; added to the Victorian Heritage Register; located within the World Heritage Environs Area	
Coolart		1897	36–40 Lord Somers Rd, Somers	Added to the Victorian Heritage Register	
St Aidan's Orphanage		1905	190 Aidans Rd, Kennington (Bendigo)	Expanded in 1909–1912 and 1930–1931 to different architects; added to the Victorian Heritage Register	
Smart Tappin & Peebles (1906)
Bates Peebles & Smart (1907)
Conservatorium of Music		1910	University of Melbourne, Parkville	Subsequently relocated; extant building was added to the Victorian Heritage Register, along with Melba Hall, that was designed by the Government Architect	
La Trobe Reading Room and Dome Gallery, Melbourne Public Library		1913	Swanston St, Melbourne	Added to the Victorian Heritage Register; Joseph Reed designed the main building from 1854	
First Church of Christ, Scientist, Melbourne		1920	366 St Kilda Rd, Melbourne	Added to the victorian Heritage Register	
Bates & Smart (1922)
Bates Smart & McCutcheon (1926)
AMP Building (former)		1932	419–429 Collins and 64–74 Market Sts, Melbourne	Awarded the RVIA Street Architecture Medal in 1932; added to the Victorian Heritage Register; Bates Smart collaborated in the design of its 1969 replacement (see below)	
Buckley & Nunn's Men's Store		1933	294–312 Bourke and 285–295 Little Bourke Sts, Melbourne	Built for Buckley & Nunn, who were taken over by David Jones in 1982; added to the Victorian Heritage Register	
Second Church of Christ, Scientist		1937	41 Cookson St, Camberwell	Deconsecrated as a church in c. 2023; repurposed as the Wat Phra Dhammakaya Melbourne, a Buddhist temple and meditation centre; added to the Victorian Heritage Register	
MLC Building (also known as the Mutual Life & Assurance Building building)		1938	42–46 Martin Pl, Sydney, NSW	Added to the New South Wales Heritage Register	
Wilson Hall		1956	University of Melbourne, Parkville	Replaced 1882 building that was destroyed by fire (see above); added to the Victorian Heritage Register	
MLC Building, North Sydney		1957	105–153 Miller St, North Sydney, NSW	Added to the New South Wales Heritage Register	
ICI House		1958	1 Nicholson St, Melbourne	Added to the Victorian Heritage Register	
Australian Embassy		1969	Scott Circle, Washington D.C., USA	Demolished after the new embassy was built in 2023; Bates Smart consulted on the design of the 2023 embassy	
AMP Square and St James Building		1969	527–555 Bourke St, Melbourne	SOM (collab.)	
Bates Smart (since 1995)
Crown Entertainment Complex		1997	Melbourne	Perrott Lyon Mathieson & Daryl Jackson (collab.)	
Federation Square including the Ian Potter Centre: NGV Australia		2002	Melbourne	Lab Architecture Studio (collab.): RAIA Walter Burley Griffin Award for Urban Design (2003); RAIA National Award for Interior Architecture (2003)	

== Archives ==
The archival records of Bates Smart and its precedent practices, that contains over 4,000 architectural drawings, client files, and photographs, have been held by The University of Melbourne since 1968.
