= Bank of Australasia, Ipswich =

Australian heritage-listed former bank

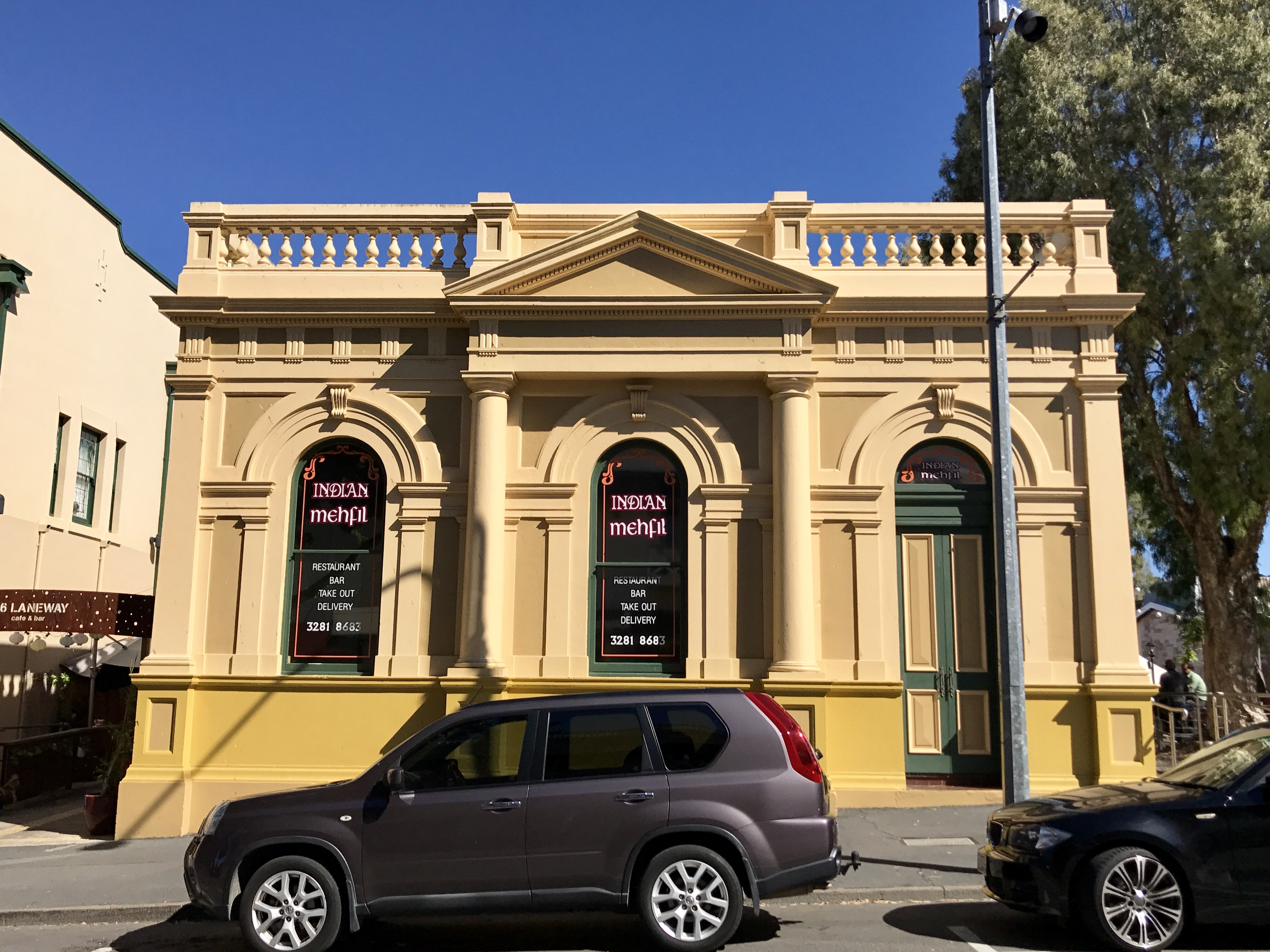
- Former Bank of Australasia, 2017

- Location within Queensland Location within Australia
- 27.6147°S 152.759°E
- Location: 116A Brisbane Street, Ipswich, City of Ipswich, Queensland, Australia

History
- Design period: 1870s–1890s (late 19th century)
- Built: 1878

Site notes
- Architect: Reed & Barnes
- Architectural style: Classicism

Queensland Heritage Register
- Official name: Former Council Offices, Brisbane Street Ipswich, Bank of Australasia, Ipswich Library, Ipswich Visitors and Tourist Information Centre
- Type: state heritage (built)
- Designated: 21 October 1992
- Reference no.: 600568
- Significant period: 1870s (fabric); 1870s–1940s (historical – bank); 1940s–1970s (historical, social – Library)
- Significant components: strong room, residential accommodation – manager's house/quarters

The Bank of Australasia is a heritage-listed former bank at 116A Brisbane Street, Ipswich, City of Ipswich, Queensland, Australia. It was designed by Reed & Barnes and built in 1878. It is also known as Council Offices, Ipswich Library, and Ipswich Visitors and Tourist Information Centre. It was added to the Queensland Heritage Register on 21 October 1992.

== History ==
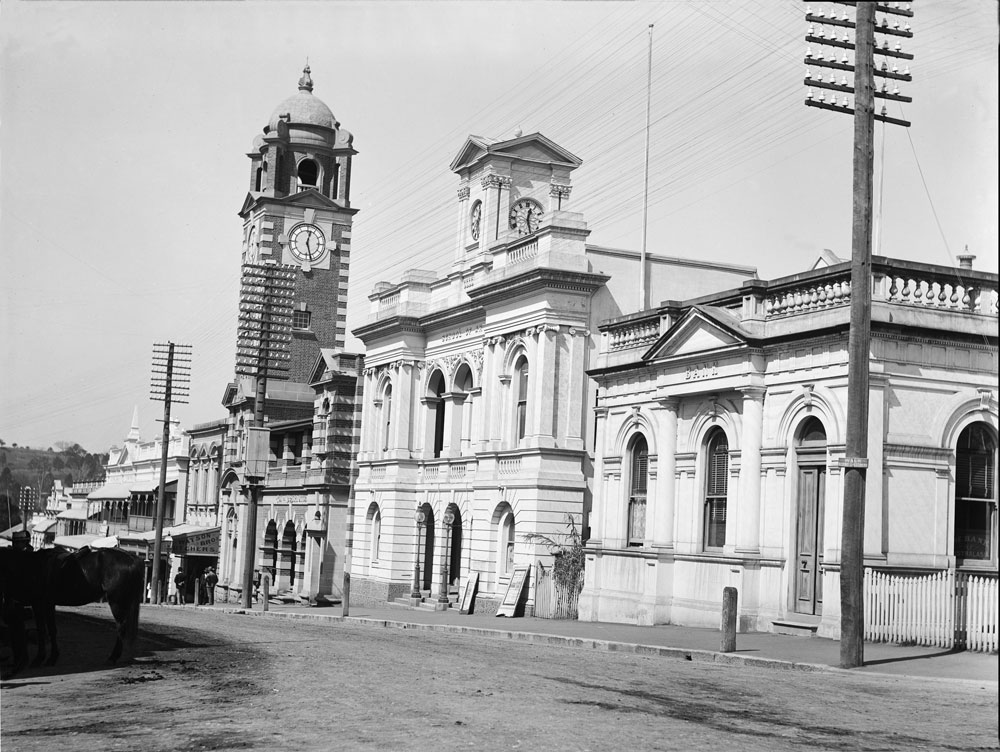
Brisbane Street, Ipswich, circa 1902: Post Office, School of Arts (Old Town Hall), Bank of Australasia

The former Bank of Australasia was constructed in 1878 with an attached manager's residence. The architects were Reed and Barnes of Melbourne. The Bank acquired a lease on the corner of Brisbane and Nicholas Streets, occupied by the original St Paul's Church which was being used as a school. The old building was demolished and a bank was constructed. The bank bought the property in 1925. The bank closed in 1943, and it remained empty until the Ipswich City Council threatened to resume the property, eventually purchasing it. In 1985, the Rates Office moved to the new Council Administration Building in South Street and the former bank was used to accommodate shops after Reids department store burned down. In 1991, the building became the city's tourist information centre and the office of Ipswich Events Corporation.

In 2015, the building was occupied by the Indian Mehfil Restaurant.

== Description ==
The former Bank of Australasia is single-storey load-bearing brick building. Internally, the remains of the strong room are identifiable and there are modern partitions. Some apparently original sections of cornice remain at the northern end.

== Heritage listing ==
The former Bank of Australasia was listed on the Queensland Heritage Register on 21 October 1992 having satisfied the following criteria.

The place is important in demonstrating the evolution or pattern of Queensland's history.

Built in 1878, the place is important in demonstrating the evolution of banking services in major towns and demonstrates the principal characteristics of a 19th-century bank with attached residence.

The place is important in demonstrating the principal characteristics of a particular class of cultural places.

Built in 1878, the place is important in demonstrating the evolution of banking services in major towns and demonstrates the principal characteristics of a 19th-century bank with attached residence.

It is associated with the work of Melbourne architects Reed and Barnes as a variant of a standard bank design adapted slightly for the Queensland climate.

The place is important because of its aesthetic significance.

It exhibits aesthetic characteristics valued by the community as a finely detailed and executed example of a revival classic commercial building. It is an important element in a group of civic buildings and makes an important contribution to the streetscape.

The place has a special association with the life or work of a particular person, group or organisation of importance in Queensland's history.

It is associated with the work of the School of Arts and Ipswich City Council in providing library services.
