= Meditation centre =

A meditation centre is a place where meditation and related activities are practiced either individually or as group. These centres are located across the world and services are offered either free or with paid admission. The centres are operated by individuals and organisations.

== Objective ==
Meditation centres are intended to help people relieve stress. These centres are located across the world and are usually located away from cities to avoid any type of distractions.

== Facilities ==
The following facilities are often included in a meditation centre:

- Museum
- Meditation halls
- Spa
- Meditation lodges
- Club houses
- Hotel
- Restaurant
- Boutique

== See also ==
- Meditation
