= Ipswich Girls' Grammar School Buildings =

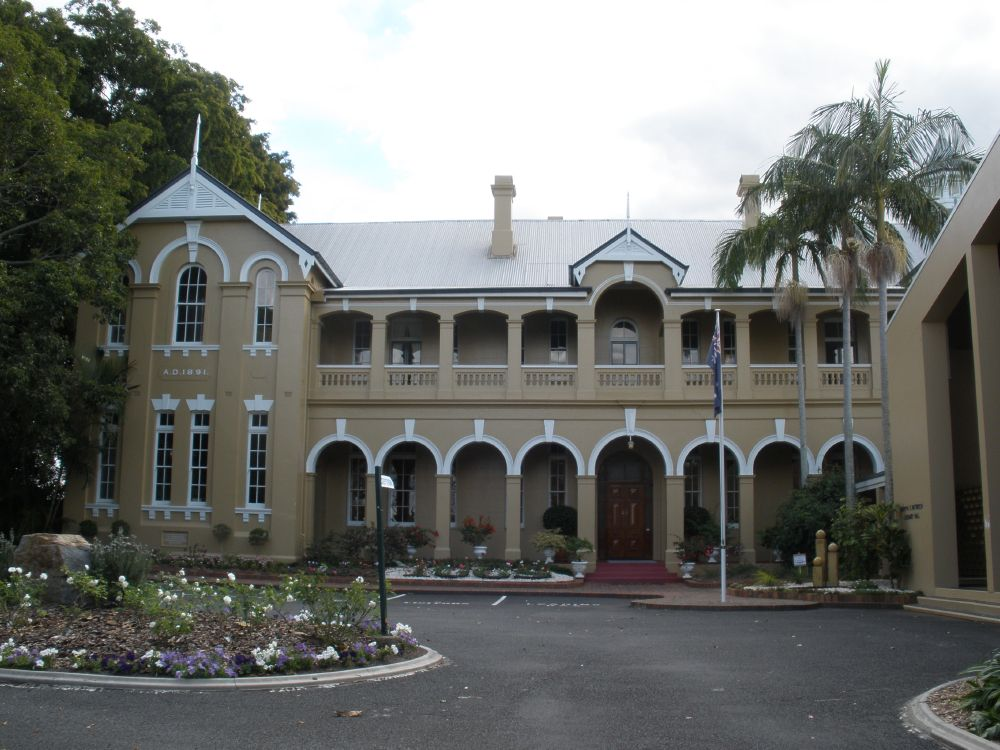
- Ipswich Girls Grammar School, 2009

- Location within Queensland
- 27.6141°S 152.7699°E
- Location: 82 Chermside Road, Ipswich, City of Ipswich, Queensland, Australia

History
- Design period: 1870s–1890s (late 19th century)
- Built: 1891–1968

Queensland Heritage Register
- Official name: Ipswich Girls Grammar School
- Type: state heritage (built, landscape)
- Designated: 21 October 1992
- Reference no.: 600565
- Significant period: 1890s ongoing (social); 1890s (historical); 1890s–1900s (fabric admin bldg); 1890s (fabric gatekeepe
- Significant components: hall – assembly, classroom/classroom block/teaching area, sculpture, gatehouse, gate – entrance, garden/grounds

Ipswich Girls' Grammar School Buildings is a heritage-listed group of private school buildings at Ipswich Girls' Grammar School, 82 Chermside Road, Ipswich, City of Ipswich, Queensland, Australia. They were built from 1891 to 1968. They were added to the Queensland Heritage Register on 21 October 1992.

== History ==
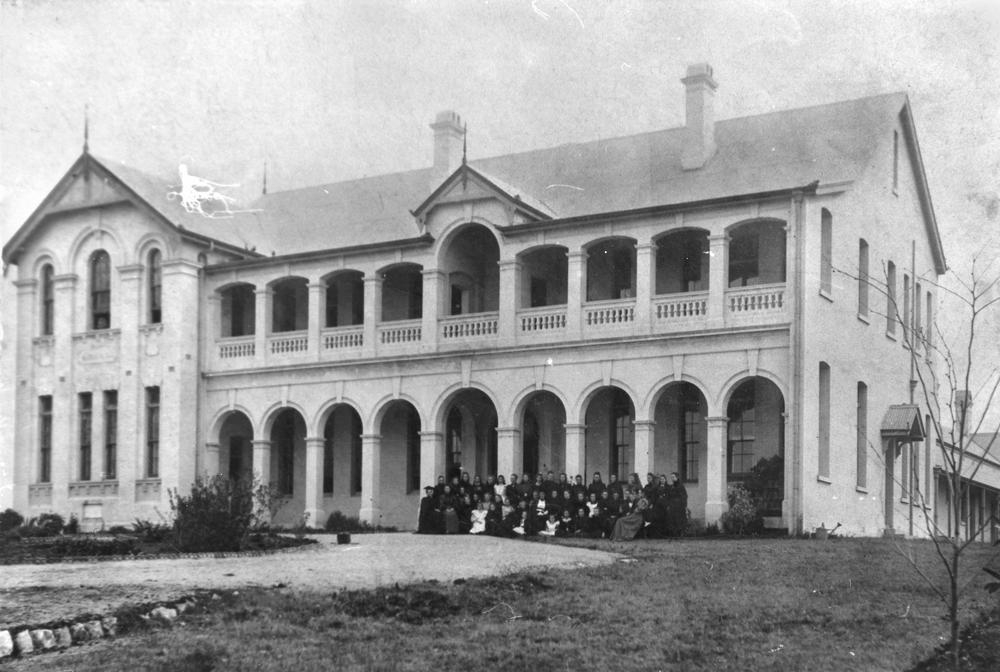
Ipswich Girls' Grammar School, 1894

The Ipswich Girls' Grammar School (IGGS) was opened in 1892 and was the last of the ten non-denominational grammar schools to be established in Queensland under the Grammar Schools Act 1860. In 1863 the Ipswich Grammar School (IGS – for boys) was established being the first Grammar School to be established in Queensland following the Grammar Schools Act, 1860. The advent of the 1860 Act and the ensuing establishment of grammar schools throughout Queensland was seen as a major advancement for education in the new colony. It brought about the first attempts by government and local communities combined to establish institutionalised, academic, secondary education in Queensland, paving the way towards the establishment of tertiary education in the state.

The Grammar Schools Act of 1860 stipulated that where £1000 could be raised by donation or subscription in any district for the establishment of a grammar school, then the Government would contribute £2000 towards the school. The race to establish the first grammar school in Queensland was racked by sectarian rivalry with the Roman Catholic Church being the first contender. However, the controversy concerning church versus state education led to the Queensland Government's refusal of Roman Catholic Bishop James Quinn's proposal to establish grammar schools at Brisbane and Ipswich on the principle that a grammar school education should be secular and free from denominational control. This was the basis on which all of the grammar schools were eventually established.

The Grammar Schools followed the traditional British format for providing an education based on languages, particularly the Classics, Latin and Greek, and usually English, Mathematics and other academic subjects.

The concept of a formal academic education for women was just emerging in Australia in the latter nineteenth century. The first grammar schools in Queensland, Ipswich and Brisbane, were established exclusively for boys but by 1874 the Brisbane Grammar School had admitted girls into the school and appointed M. O'Connor as Headmistress. In 1883 Brisbane Girls' Grammar School was established for girls. In 1881 Rockhampton Grammar School was established as a co-educational school and in 1892 a separate Rockhampton Girls' Grammar School had been established. Again in 1883 the Ladies' Committee in Maryborough had established the Maryborough Girls' Grammar School and in 1893 the Townsville Grammar School became co-educational and has remained co-educational until the present.

By the late 1870s there was mounting pressure in Ipswich to establish a girls grammar as expressed in an editorial to The Queensland Times, 21 December 1876:

We would urge upon our townspeople and particularly upon the trustees of our Grammar School the importance of at once taking steps for the establishment of a Girls Grammar School in Ipswich. Our boys have had the opportunity - of which many have availed themselves - of receiving a thorough English and Classical education. But what has been done in the way of providing higher education for our girls? Nothing!

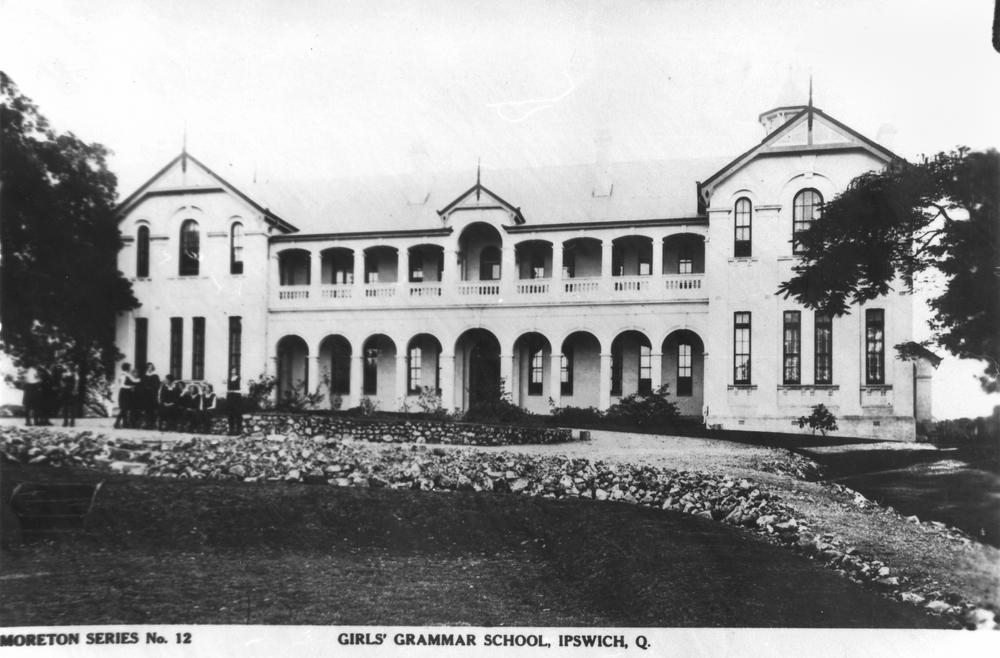
Main school building with right wing added, 1929

In 1887 a committee was formed to raise funds for the establishment of a girls' grammar school, and in 1890 the land for the current site of the school was granted by the trustees of Queen's Park in Ipswich. In the same year, George Brockwell Gill had been appointed architect and was contracted to design a school building for a cost of £3500. Tenders for construction were called in The Queensland Times on 21 Jan 1891 and contractors Worley and Whitehead were accepted with a tender of £3893. The foundation stone of the school was laid on 10 March 1891 by acting governor, Sir Arthur Hunter Palmer, K.C.M.G. The architect of the original building, George Brockwell Gill, designed many of the grand residences and public buildings in Ipswich from the 1880s to the 1930s. Some of his works include "Brynhyfryd" for Lewis Thomas (1889/90), St Paul's Rectory (1895), the Ipswich Club House (1916), Ipswich Technical College (1901), and supervision of the construction of the Walter Burley Griffin Incinerator in 1936. Gill emigrated from London and settled in Ipswich in 1886 where he commenced work as an architect for the firm of Samuel Shenton. Gill took over Shenton's practice in 1889 when Shenton retired. Gill had been elected Associate of the Queensland Institute of Architects in 1904 and Fellow by 1913. He was its vice-president in 1914–16 and president in 1918–19. Gill was also a member of the board of trustees for the school and on his retirement in 1948 he was the chairman of the board of trustees.

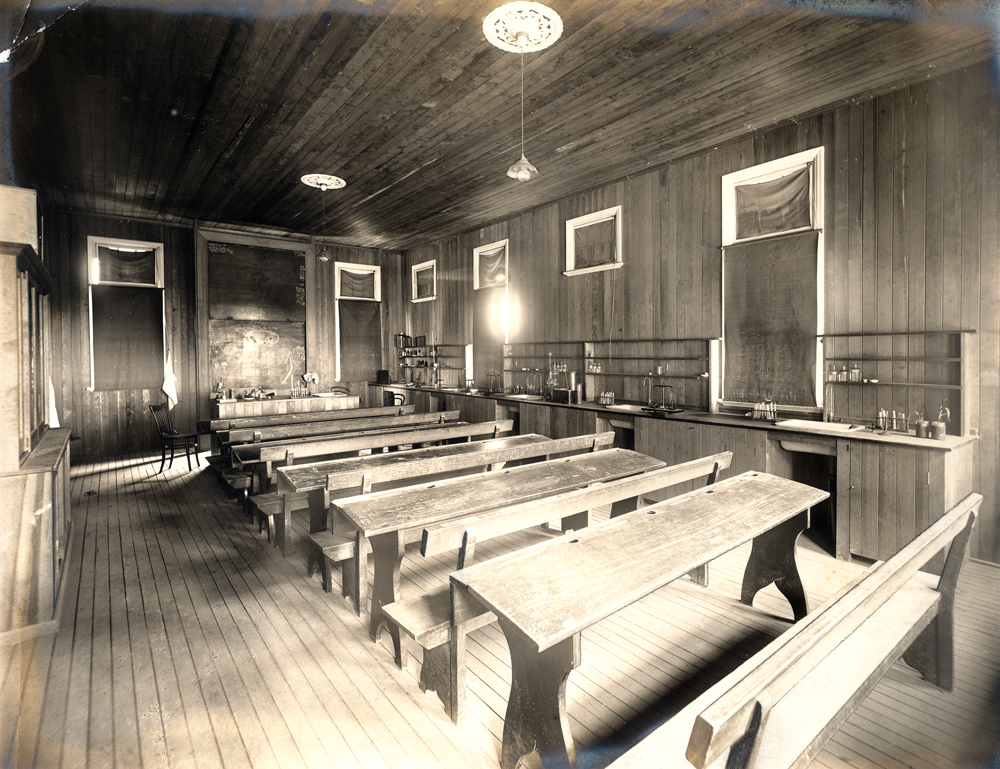
Classroom, 1925

IGGS opened to students on 1 February 1892 with an enrolment of 31 girls under the charge of the first headmistress, Fanny E. Hunt, B.Sc., University of Sydney, appointed by the board of trustees in October 1891. The school also employed two assistant teachers and one junior teacher. The subjects offered included English, Latin, German, French, political science, botany, chemistry, physics, geology, domestic economy, drill and gymnastics, geography, ancient and modern history, writing, drawing and book-keeping. The school had an immediate impact on the education young women; from the first group of 31 students came the first Queensland woman to take a degree in medicine (Eleanor Constance Greenham), the first woman to take a degree of Master of Arts in mathematics at Sydney University (Estelle Cribb), a distinguished artist (Violet Rudkin) and a principal of Osborne College in the Blue Mountains (Violet Gibbons). Both the second and third women to be called to the Queensland Bar were educated at IGGS.

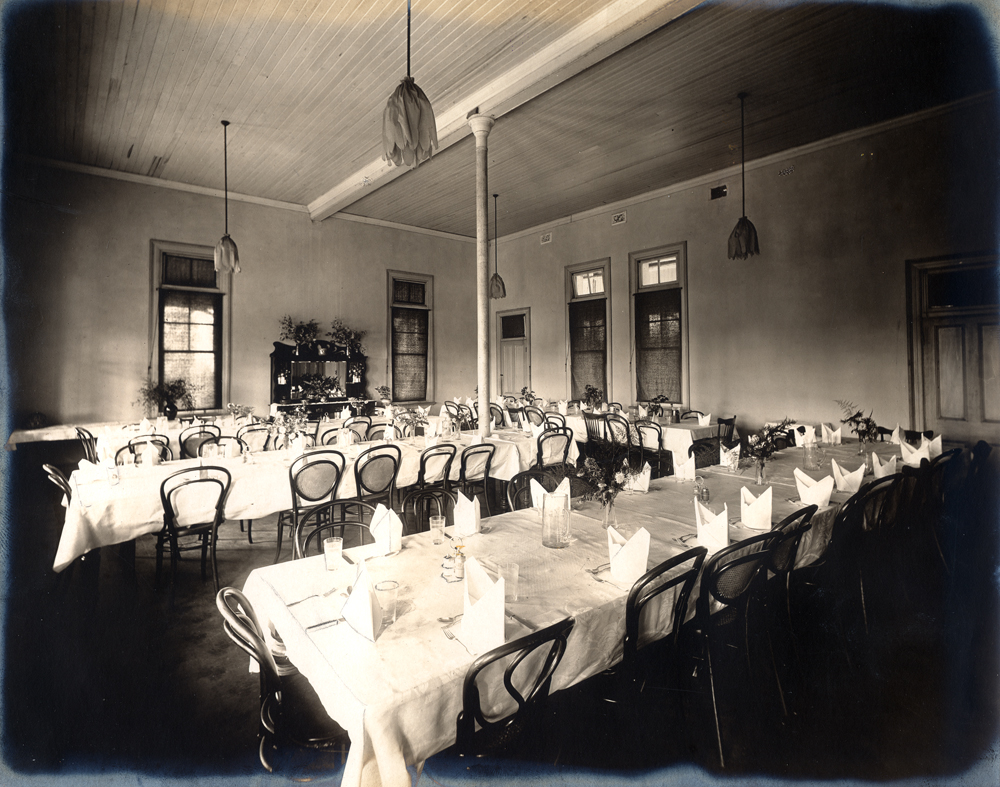
Dining room, 1925

Later in 1892, a gymnasium, play shed, stables, fences, roads and trees were added to the school grounds. Amongst the trees planted at this time were those lining the main driveway, forming an avenue consisting of weeping figs, Moreton Bay figs and camphor laurels. The gatekeeper's lodge was also built in 1892 by Worely and Whitehead for £153 to the design of George Brockwell Gill. The trustees of the school demanded that the kitchen, as well as the living room, of the lodge have a view of the school's gate with the idea that the caretaker's wife would attend the gate while in the kitchen.

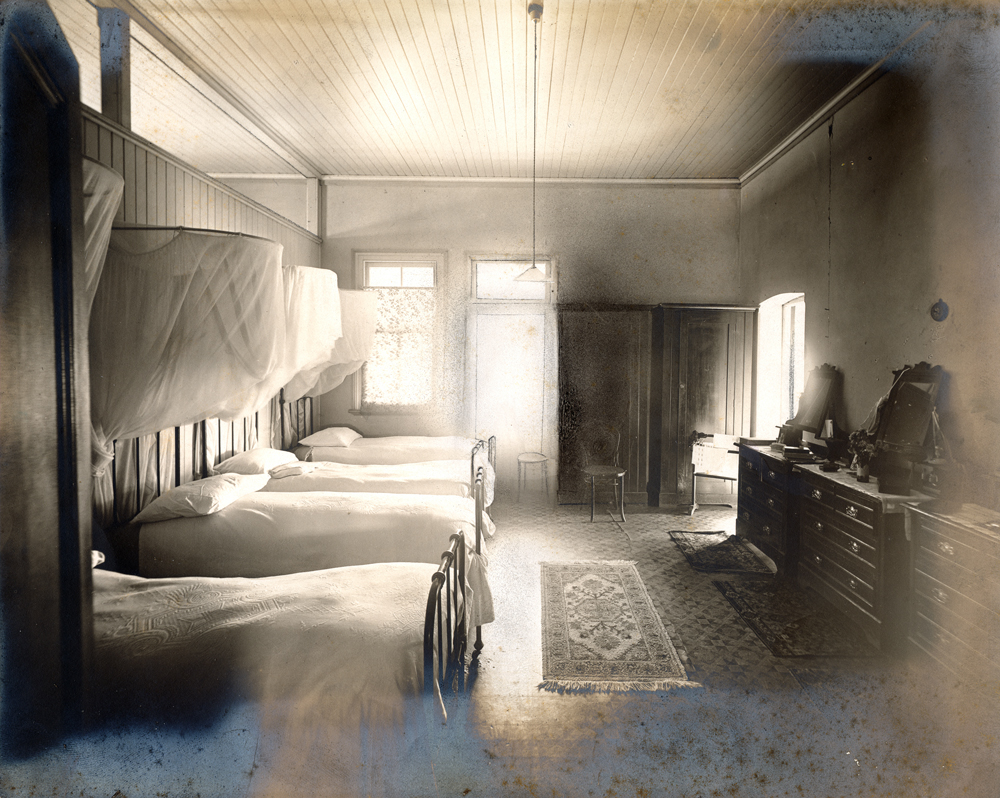
Dormitory, 1925

In 1901 the original school building was extended on its northern side to the design of George Brockwell Gill, giving the school a symmetrical frontage and adding a decorative lantern in the northern wing. In 1952 the current gates to the school were opened as the Estelle Cribb Memorial Gates. Estelle Cribb was a former student of IGGS and later became a teacher there after completing her University studies in Sydney. The Cribb family has had a strong association with IGGS from its beginnings, Thomas Bridson Cribb M.L.A. being the first chairman of the board of trustees of IGGS. The Cribbs have served as trustees on the board until the present day.

In 1968 the assembly hall was opened which was designed by architect Karl Langer. Langer was a respected authority in house design for the sub-tropics. In 1944 Langer published a paper, "Sub-tropical Housing" which was a forerunner to subsequent publications on climatic design. He was a lecturer at the University of Queensland for many years. The assembly hall at IGGS exemplifies some of his principles of climate control.

The gatekeeper's lodge was converted into new accommodation for speech and drama subjects by removing some of the internal walls to make a small theatre and classroom and converting the kitchen into a workshop and the bathroom into a make-up room. This work was undertaken by Arthur Lumley in 1983. In 1991 the lodge was extended in period style by David Pagendam and Associates. A replica building has been constructed on the western side of the old lodge as a small theatre auditorium, designed. In 1977 the assembly hall was extended by Bruce Buchanan Architects Pty Ltd.

Since 1995 several new complexes have been added to the grounds included the gymnasium on the south-west portion of the school.

== Description ==
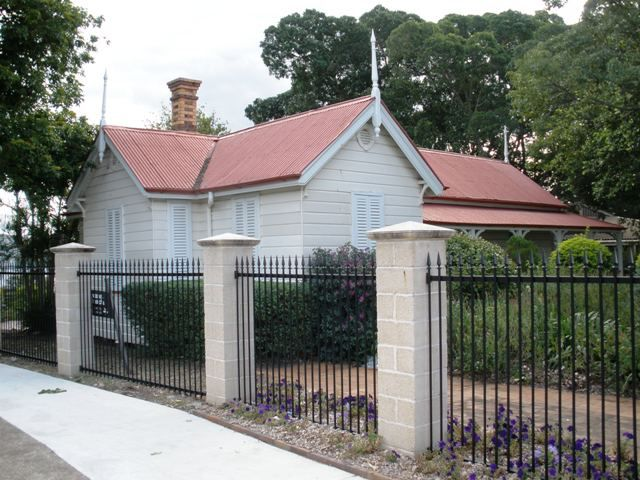
Gatekeeper's Lodge

Ipswich Girl's Grammar School is approached from the highest point of Brisbane Street near the Chermside Road fiveways intersection. The school gates were constructed as a memorial to Estelle Cribb in 1952. The gates lead into an avenue of mature trees which continues to the main buildings. To the left of the entrance is the gatekeeper's lodge, designed by Brockwell Gill and constructed in 1892. This building is a lowset timber-framed house clad with chamferboards. The roofline is made up of three gables with separate skillion roofs to the verandahs. The verandahs are simply detailed with timber railings and brackets. This building has been extended and has had internal alterations. A replica cottage has been constructed next to it to house a theatre workshop.

Terminating the tree lined avenue are the Assembly Hall and the Administration building. The Administration building was the first building constructed on the site. It is a classical two storey rendered brick building, designed by Brockwell Gill, that was constructed in stages from 1892. The first stage consisted of the central portion with a transverse gabled wing to the left hand end. Another transverse gabled wing was added at the right hand end in 1901, completing the symmetry of the building. The gabled ends have pilasters rising up through two storeys and terminating in three semi-circular arches above the upper storey windows. The date of construction of each wing is inscribed in raised lettering below each central upper window. The central portion of the facade consists of a ground floor arcaded verandah with a central semi-circular arch leading to the central entrance door. This semi-circular arch is repeated on the upper verandah and is surmounted by a central gabled roof. Timber finials and decorative timber fretwork are at the end of each gable. The internal walls of the Administration building consist mainly of a painted rendered finish up to the dado line with painted brick above. The majority of the interior timber joinery is intact. A decorative roof lantern lights the fine timber stairwell in the 1901 wing. The 1892 wing also contains a more simply detailed timber stair. The upper room in this wing features heavy timber roof trusses with a diagonally boarded ceiling lined on the rake and timber honour boards dating back to the formation of the school. The rear of the Administration building consists of several wings built around a central courtyard. The rear wings were constructed in stages, beginning with a single storey and resulting in two storey wings to three sides of the courtyard. These wings are of brick and timber construction, with narrow verandahs on both sides of a central room core. The verandahs are simply detailed with timber balustrades with a cross pattern and curved timber brackets.

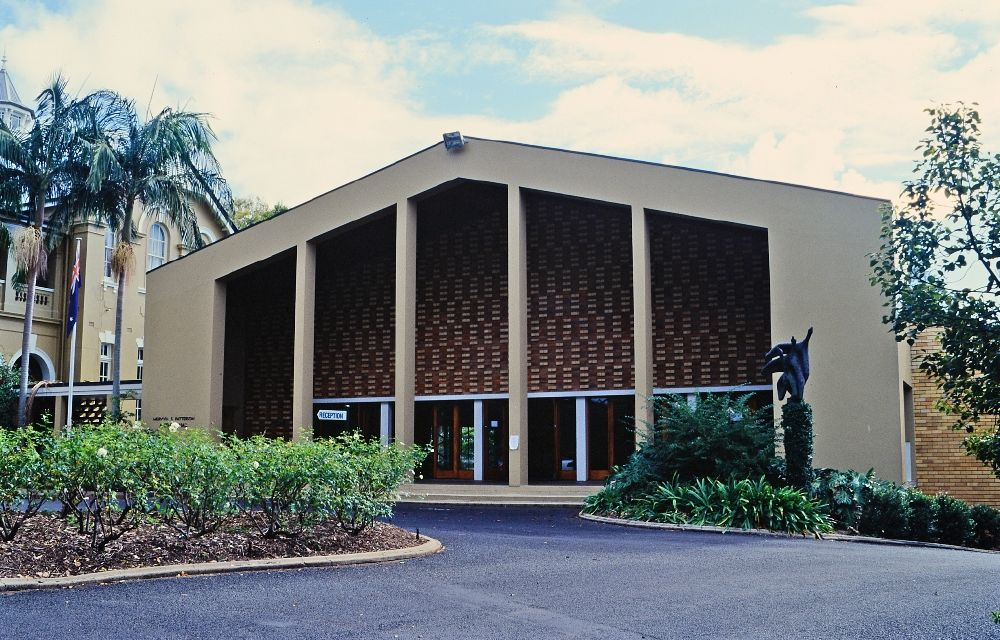
Assembly Hall designed by Karl Langer

The Assembly Hall was designed in 1964 by Karl Langer and terminates the tree lined entry avenue. The hall has a simple gabled portico to the front with a finely textured face-brick main wall behind. A Shillam sculpture of birds in flight is in the forecourt of the building. Double glazed timber doors lead into the foyer at the front of the building. The interior volume of the hall is punctuated by steel webbed truss portal frames which continue out to support the roof of a side aisle on the eastern side. Langer's concern with climatic design is shown in the design of the building. Indirect light is admitted to the hall through eastern clerestory glazing. A folded brick wall to the eastern aisle has glazing on the south walls to admit additional indirect light. High level louvres on the western wall allow the exit of warm air and aid cross-ventilation. Original metal and glass light fittings remain in the foyer and the dark-stained vertical boarded detailing to parts of the hall is intact. The hall has been extended since it was constructed.

== Heritage listing ==
The Ipswich Girls Grammar School Buildings were listed on the Queensland Heritage Register on 21 October 1992 having satisfied the following criteria.

The place is important in demonstrating the evolution or pattern of Queensland's history.

Established in 1891, Ipswich Girl's Grammar School is an important example of an early secondary girls' school in Queensland and reflects the development of education in Queensland. The youngest of the Grammar Schools in Queensland, it demonstrates the culmination of the Grammar School movement which saw Grammar Schools established throughout the state since the Grammar Schools Act of 1860.

The place is important because of its aesthetic significance.

It has aesthetic significance as an important civic group with grounds occupying the dominating slope to the immediate north-east of the city centre with townscape importance to the immediate streets and the distant city views. The memorial entrance gates with the 1893 gate-house and the tree-lined driveway leading to the original school building designed by George Brockwell Gill and the 1960s assembly hall designed by Karl Langer are particularly important to the aesthetic value of the school.

The place has a strong or special association with a particular community or cultural group for social, cultural or spiritual reasons.

Ipswich Girls' Grammar School has strong association with the past, present and future generations of the school community. It also has strong association with the local community of Ipswich having been a landmark in the city since 1891.

The place has a special association with the life or work of a particular person, group or organisation of importance in Queensland's history.

It possesses strong association with the work of prominent Ipswich architect George Brockwell Gill who designed the original building in 1891 and additions to this building in 1901. It is a good example of one of his earlier works preceding his most notable work for the Ipswich Technical College (1901) and other buildings in Ipswich including the Ipswich Club House (1916), Hotel Metropole (1906) and the Walter Burley Griffin Incinerator (1936).

The school also has special association with the work of architect Karl Langer who designed the assembly hall opened in 1968. It is a good example of his work exemplifying his principles of design for climate.
