= School House, Townsville Grammar School =

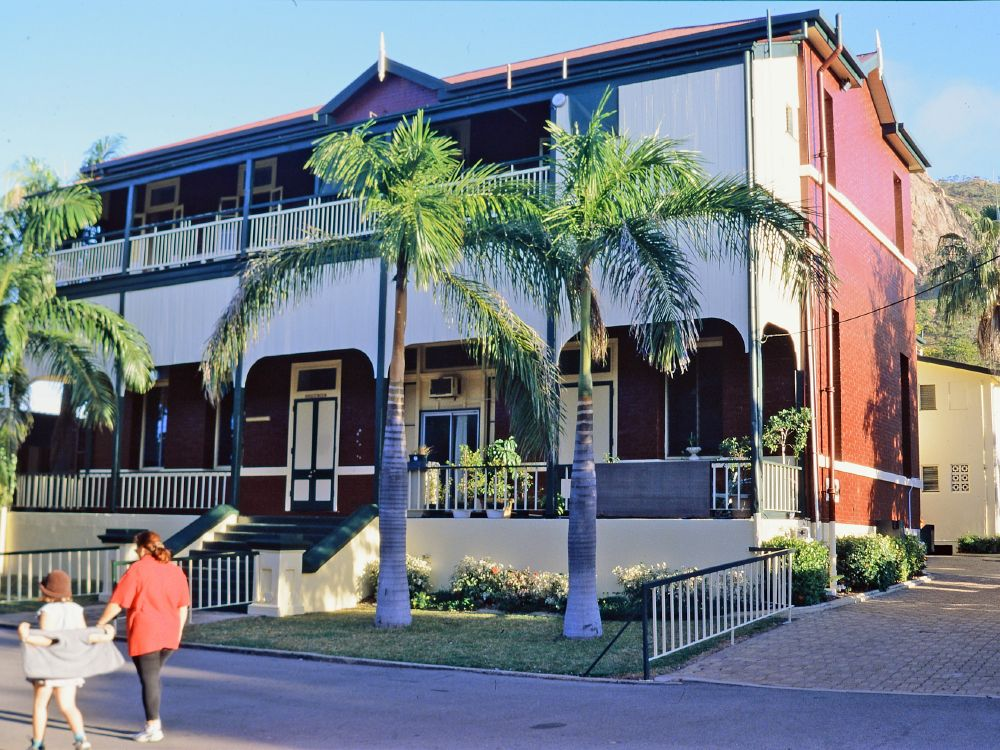
- School House, 2000

- Location within Queensland Location within Australia
- 19.2516°S 146.8061°E
- Location: Paxton Street, North Ward, City of Townsville, Queensland, Australia

History
- Design period: 1870s–1890s (late 19th century)
- Built: 1903–1904

Site notes
- Architect: Tunbridge & Tunbridge
- Architectural style: Classicism

Queensland Heritage Register
- Official name: School House, Townsville Grammar School
- Type: state heritage (built)
- Designated: 31 December 2002
- Reference no.: 601029
- Significant period: 1880s–1900s (historical); 1900s (fabric); 1903–ongoing (social)
- Significant components: school/school room

School House at Townsville Grammar School is a heritage-listed school building at Paxton Street, North Ward, City of Townsville, Queensland, Australia. It was designed by Tunbridge & Tunbridge and built from 1903 to 1904. It was added to the Queensland Heritage Register on 31 December 2002.

== History ==
The present School House building at Townsville Grammar School was built from 1903 to 1904 to a design by Townsville architects Tunbridge and Tunbridge. It replaced an 1888 FDG Stanley-designed building which was severely damaged by Cyclone Leonta on 9 March 1903. While sympathetic to the Stanley design, the Tunbridge and Tunbridge building was strengthened to resist future cyclones.

The Townsville Grammar School had opened in 1888, founded on the subscriptions of a number of influential members of North Queensland society including Robert Philp, Isaac Tyson, and Thankful Willmett. It was the last and most northerly of Queensland's grammar schools and gathered students from the vast area of North Queensland and overseas, providing the closest access to secondary education for children gaining grammar school scholarships in North Queensland.

The Grammar Schools Act 1860, under which the Townsville Grammar School was established, was modelled on the Sydney Grammar Schools Act 1854, and provided government support for the establishment of grammar schools in the colony of Queensland. Schools established under this Act provided the only government-subsidised secondary education available in Queensland until the introduction of free high school education in 1912. The 1860 Act provided that where local communities raised £1,000 the government would contribute another £2,000 toward the establishment of a grammar school, with a further £250 endowment annually when school fees of £250 per annum were guaranteed for 3 years. An amendment to this Act in 1864 increased the amount to be raised to £2,000, the guaranteed fees to £500 and the endowment to £1,000. Their curriculum and philosophy was based on the English tradition of liberal education and included sport, as well as classical and modern studies. In contrast to the southern colonies, Queensland's grammar schools were established along secular lines, providing secondary education for all classes and denomination without any distinction. In support of this principle, grammar school scholarships were awarded on academic merit to eligible students in their final year of primary education.

Townsville Grammar School opened in 1888 as a boys' school, but the school has accepted female students since 1893 when Mary Foley applied for admission. There was much debate over the admission of girls, some parents considering them to be a disruptive influence on the boys' academic studies and that their admission would require expenditure on building modifications. However others saw the financial benefit of their admission in a time of economic depression, when declining student numbers threatened the loss of their annual Queensland Government endowment.

As the establishment of co-education was not specifically covered by the 1860 Act or 1864 Amendment there was no legal basis for refusing the admission of girls and the Under Secretary for Public Instruction advised that it was a matter for the trustees to consider. Mr Hodges, the headmaster, stated he was willing to admit girls to the school citing the success of such schools in America as evidence for his decision. After consultation with parents, it was resolved that girls holding grammar scholarships would be admitted to the school as day students until such time as a Girls' Grammar School was established. However, by 1905 the idea of establishing a Girls' Grammar School had been abandoned due to financial constraints and co-education at Townsville Grammar School was adopted as a matter of principle.

Townsville Grammar School's adoption of co-education from 1893, distinguished it from other grammar schools in Queensland where separate boys' and girls' schools were established. Over the years a number of girls who have attended Townsville Grammar have achieved distinction: Agnes McWhinney who attended the school in 1906 became the first female solicitor in Queensland in 1915, and in 1944 Shirley Richards won the Byrnes medal for the best Junior pass in Queensland.

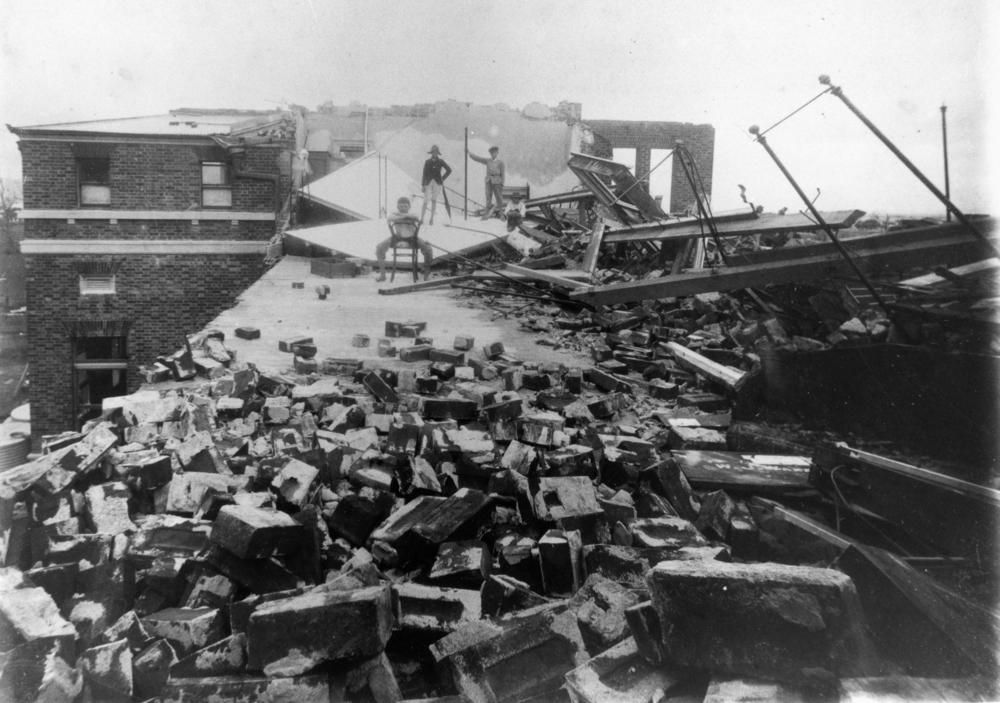
Destruction of part of Townsville Grammar School caused by Cyclone Leonta, 1903

When the 1888 Townsville Grammar School building was damaged in 1903, the Trustees borrowed £3,000 from the government to rebuild. Lieut.-Colonel WH Tunbridge, a leading North Queensland architect and civil engineer, was responsible for the rebuilding of the School House building, as well as the reconstruction of other Townsville buildings. In the restoration and rebuilding of these buildings the effects of cyclonic winds were taken into account. Evidence suggests that the School House building was completely dismantled and rebuilt using some of the same bricks. To strengthen the building Tunbridge, who was a pioneer of the use of concrete in Australia, used cement based mortar, instead of the more common lime, to lay the bricks in the new building. He also increased the thickness of the main walls to 18 inches (460 mm) below the surface and the 14 inches (360 mm) above. The roof appeared less steeply pitched and is said to have been braced with steel which created greater strength against future cyclones. His design was sympathetic to the original Stanley design and copied the T-shaped layout; however the new building was more tropical in appearance. It was considered a cooler better-planned school building and featured wide verandahs on both levels which were used for sleeping in hot weather. This potential was advertised in the 1922 Illustrated Prospectus. Until 1940 all lessons, except for science, were conducted on the lower level of the School House building while the upper level provided dormitories for some of the boarders.

Like other schools in Townsville, Townsville Grammar was commandeered during the Second World War. The RAAF took over the buildings and grounds in February 1942 and its No.3 Fighter Sector HQ, which monitored and identified aircraft in the region and initiated air-raid warnings, were stationed at the school. Aerials and wires were visible on the roofs of the buildings, and huts were set up on the ovals to house members of the WAAAF. Meanwhile, the School moved into premises at Rosslea until January 1945, and did not regain full use of the whole grounds until later that year.

Since the 1950s the school has expanded dramatically both in student numbers and physically, with the School House building now virtually surrounded by other buildings. School House was closed to Boarders in 2012 to facilitate renovation and restoration works. Meticulous restoration was carried out over 10 years to restore School House to her original glory. The exterior was stripped of layers of paint to expose the brickwork. The beautifully appointed interior now houses two utility function rooms, the School Boardroom and office space for the School Principal. On the upper floor a modern kitchen for catering is in place, whilst space has been allocated for a school museum.

Over the years Townsville Grammar School has achieved academic distinction, with two past students awarded Rhodes Scholarships: GFE Hall in 1910 and Chester Parker in 1938.

== Description ==
The T-shaped building is a two storeyed brick and timber structure with the majority of the brickwork painted dark brown except for a small section of the front verandah of the upper storey. The front of the School House faces NNE towards the Strand with a wing projecting at right angles towards Castle Hill from behind the centre front. A dominant feature of the internal architecture of the building is an archway in the centre of the back wing on both levels. The archway on the upper level is smaller and the supporting walls extend into the room further than the one on the lower level. There is also evidence in a filled in wall in the boarding masters' room on the lower level of another small archway. The rooms on both levels have tongue and groove ceilings with the ceiling on the lower level much higher than the upper one.

Verandah ceilings on the upper storey are lined with wide tongue and groove boards and the floors are of hardwood. The verandah posts have been stop chamfered on the edges with two mouldings, a smaller neck mould and a larger capping mould, placed around the post above the stop chamfering, so that the finished verandah post reflected classical influence. A frieze of timber battens defines the lower verandahs on the NNE, SSW and WNW sides of the building extending from under the upper storey. The balustrading on the upper storey of the front of the building is vertical dowel elaborated by the addition of a second horizontal rail just below the top handrail with dowels finishing at either top or lower rail to create a regular pattern.

The roof is of corrugated iron. The roof of the front wing is a hipped roof with a small gable introduced into the centre edge of each end and on the centre front edge. A finial projects through each of these. This gable and finial also exists in the centre edge of the roof on the SSW side of the building. The verandah roofs are stepped down from the main roof structure.

The steps on the NNE and WNW sides of the building appear to be cement rendered. The School House building features solid timber French doors however the ones on the upper level opening onto the verandah are glass and timber. Most French doors have fanlight windows above them. There are also a couple of heavy timber panelled doors. The original front entrance door has been replaced by a glass sliding door, however a panel of the original etched glass that would have surrounded the front door is still visible. Glass and metal louvres have replaced the original windows in the building however an original sash window still exists at the front of the building on the upper storey. Two window openings on the WNW side of the building have been bricked up however the flat arches of these window openings are still visible in the brickwork. The building and an older metal ladder at the ESE end of the front verandah. For comfort some modern features have been added to the building.

== Heritage listing ==
School House was listed on the Queensland Heritage Register on 31 December 2002 having satisfied the following criteria.

The place is important in demonstrating the evolution or pattern of Queensland's history.

The School House, erected 1903–04 as the Townsville Grammar School and as a replacement for the cyclone-damaged 1888 grammar school building on the same site, is important in demonstrating the history of education and the development of grammar schools in Queensland. Townsville Grammar School, opened in 1888, was the only grammar school established in North Queensland, and played an important role in the provision of subsidised secondary education to the North Queensland community, prior to the establishment of state secondary schools. It is also the longest surviving co-educational grammar school in Queensland. The place is also important to the history of Queensland because of its role as an aircraft monitoring and air raid warning centre during the Second World War.

The place is important in demonstrating the principal characteristics of a particular class of cultural places.

School House is important in demonstrating the principal characteristics of an early 20th century grammar school building, including provision for boarders.

The place is important because of its aesthetic significance.

The building is important also in demonstrating the aesthetic achievements of early 20th century tropical architecture.

The place is important in demonstrating a high degree of creative or technical achievement at a particular period.

The building is important also in demonstrating the technical achievements of early 20th century tropical architecture.

The place has a strong or special association with a particular community or cultural group for social, cultural or spiritual reasons.

School House has a special association with the Townsville community and the community of the Townsville Grammar School for social and cultural reasons.

The place has a special association with the life or work of a particular person, group or organisation of importance in Queensland's history.

The place also has a special association with the work of WH Tunbridge, one of North Queensland's leading architects and engineers in the late 19th and early 20th centuries.
