= Merilyn Manley-Harris =

New Zealand academic chemist

- Born: 1947 or 1948 (age 77–78)
- Education: James Cook University, University of Montana
- Scientific career
- Fields: Chemistry
- Workplaces: University of Waikato
- Thesis: Oligo- and polysaccharides formed during the thermolysis of sucrose (1993)

Merilyn Manley-Harris (born 1947 or 1948) is a New Zealand chemist, and is a professor emeritus at the University of Waikato, specialising in carbohydrate chemistry, particularly relating to mānuka honey.

== Academic career ==
Manley-Harris taught in England and Malta, before earning a Bachelor of Science degree at James Cook University in Australia. She taught chemistry at Townsville Grammar School, before completing a PhD, aged 45, titled Oligo- and polysaccharides formed during the thermolysis of sucrose at the University of Montana in 1993. Manley Harris then moved to the University of Waikato, where she was initially appointed jointly at Scion. She was promoted to full professor in 2019.

Manley-Harris led the team that, in 2009, identified the precursor to antibacterial chemicals in mānuka honey. It was already known that levels of methylglyoxal (MGO) in honey were associated with antibacterial activity, and that these levels tended to increase during storage of the honey. Manley-Harris's discovery that the MGO was being produced from dihydroxyacetone (DHA) allowed the development of a test for DHA levels in batches of honey. Beekepers would be able to test DHA levels to predict which batches would go on to have high levels of DHA, and thus would be worth storing, and which batches to sell young.

In 2021, Manley-Harris was part of the team, led by Mike Clearwater, that discovered how mānuka flowers produce the precursor to the active ingredient in mānuka honey. In 2023, she was accorded the title of professor emeritus by the University of Waikato.

While she is best-known for her work on honey, Manley-Harris has also researched how to use dental enamel to determine the origin of possums, the toxicity of karaka berries, antibiotic retention in soils and the structure of biochar.

== Selected works ==
- Christopher J Adams; Cherie H Boult; Benjamin J Deadman; Judie M Farr; Megan N C Grainger; Merilyn Manley-Harris; Melanie J Snow (14 January 2008). "Isolation by HPLC and characterisation of the bioactive fraction of New Zealand manuka (Leptospermum scoparium) honey". Carbohydrate Research. 343 (4): 651–659. doi:10.1016/j.carres.2007.12.011. ISSN 0008-6215. PMID 18194804. Wikidata Q39101408.
- Christopher J Adams; Merilyn Manley-Harris; Peter C Molan (21 March 2009). "The origin of methylglyoxal in New Zealand manuka (Leptospermum scoparium) honey". Carbohydrate Research. 344 (8): 1050–1053. doi:10.1016/j.carres.2009.03.020. ISSN 0008-6215. PMID 19368902. Wikidata Q46050043.
- Flavia Carmelina Massaro; M Katouli; Tanja Grkovic; et al. (4 April 2014). "Anti-staphylococcal activity of C-methyl flavanones from propolis of Australian stingless bees (Tetragonula carbonaria) and fruit resins of Corymbia torelliana (Myrtaceae)". Fitoterapia. 95: 247–257. doi:10.1016/j.fitote.2014.03.024. ISSN 0367-326X. PMID 24704551. Wikidata Q46909449.
- Ranmadugala Dinali; Alireza Ebrahiminezhad; Merilyn Manley-Harris; Younes Ghasemi; Aydin Berenjian (10 January 2017). "Iron oxide nanoparticles in modern microbiology and biotechnology". Critical Reviews in Microbiology. 43 (4): 493–507. doi:10.1080/1040841x.2016.1267708. ISSN 1040-841X. PMID 28068855. Wikidata Q38772758.
- Prakash Srinivasan; Ajit Sarmah; Merilyn Manley-Harris (8 December 2013). "Sorption of selected veterinary antibiotics onto dairy farming soils of contrasting nature". Science of the Total Environment. 472: 695–703. doi:10.1016/j.scitotenv.2013.11.104. ISSN 0048-9697. PMID 24326064. Wikidata Q54114373.
- John McDonald-Wharry; Merilyn Manley-Harris; Kim Pickering (August 2013). "Carbonisation of biomass-derived chars and the thermal reduction of a graphene oxide sample studied using Raman spectroscopy". Carbon. 59: 383–405. doi:10.1016/j.carbon.2013.03.033. ISSN 0008-6223. Wikidata Q59591556.
