= Fanny Elizabeth Hunt =

Australian headteacher

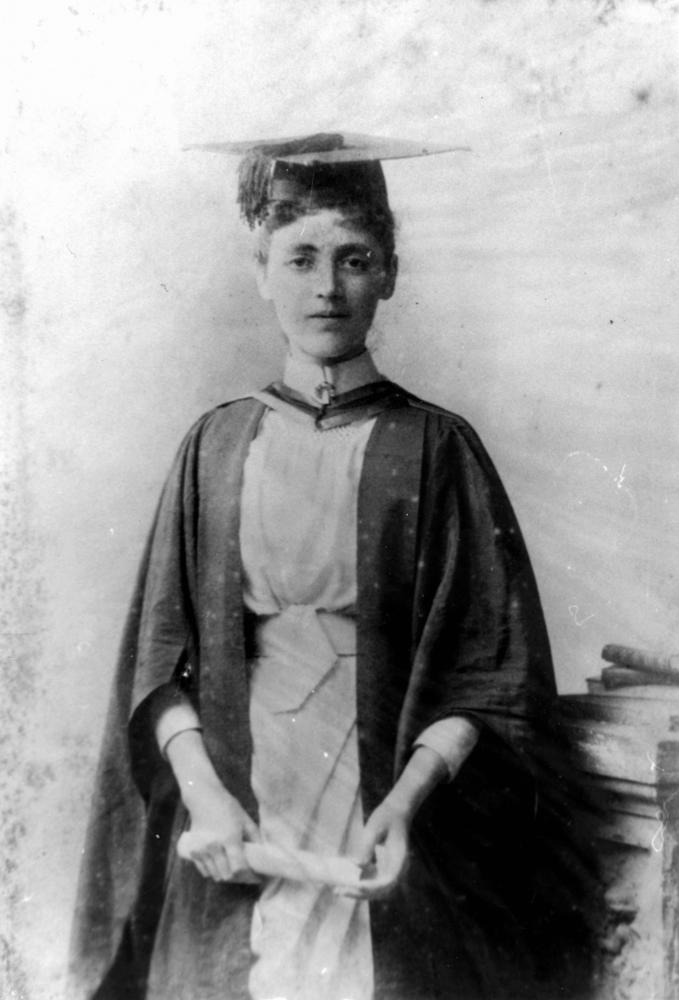
- Born: July 25, 1863
- Died: June 1941 (aged 77)
- Occupation: Headteacher
- Employer: Ipswich Girls' Grammar School
- Known for: First woman to graduate with a Bachelor of Science from the University of Sydney

Fanny Elizabeth Hunt (25 July 1863 - June 1941) was the first woman to graduate with a Bachelor of Science from the University of Sydney, Australia, graduating in 1888. She was the founding head of Ipswich Girls' Grammar School.

== Personal life ==
Hunt was born in Reading, England and was one of ten children of Margaret Morgan (1838-1937) and Edwin Hunt (1837-1895), a teacher who became the headmaster of the Randwick Orphanage School. The family moved to Australia in 1879.

== Education ==
She started her degree in the Faculty of Arts but in her second year enrolled in the Faculty of Science. She graduated in the Great Hall at Sydney University on Saturday 14 April 1888, becoming the first woman to graduate with a Bachelor of Science degree from the University of Sydney. She was presented by Professor Liversidge to the Chancellor Sir William Manning who conferred the degree.

== Teaching career ==
She first taught botany at St Catherine's School, Waverley from 1888, brought in by then headmistress, Helen Phillips. She was the first headmistress of Ipswich Girls' Grammar School, Queensland, from its opening in 1892 until 1901, being selected from a group of thirty applicants 'of unusual merit'. One of the school's houses in named in her honour. In 1903 she founded Girton College, a girls' boarding school in Toowoomba, which closed in 1910. The Toowoomba Preparatory School opened on its site in 1911.

== Professional memberships ==
Hunt was a member of the Australasian Association for the Advancement of Science, and a life member of the Linnean Society.
