= Queen Victoria Silver Jubilee Memorial Technical College =

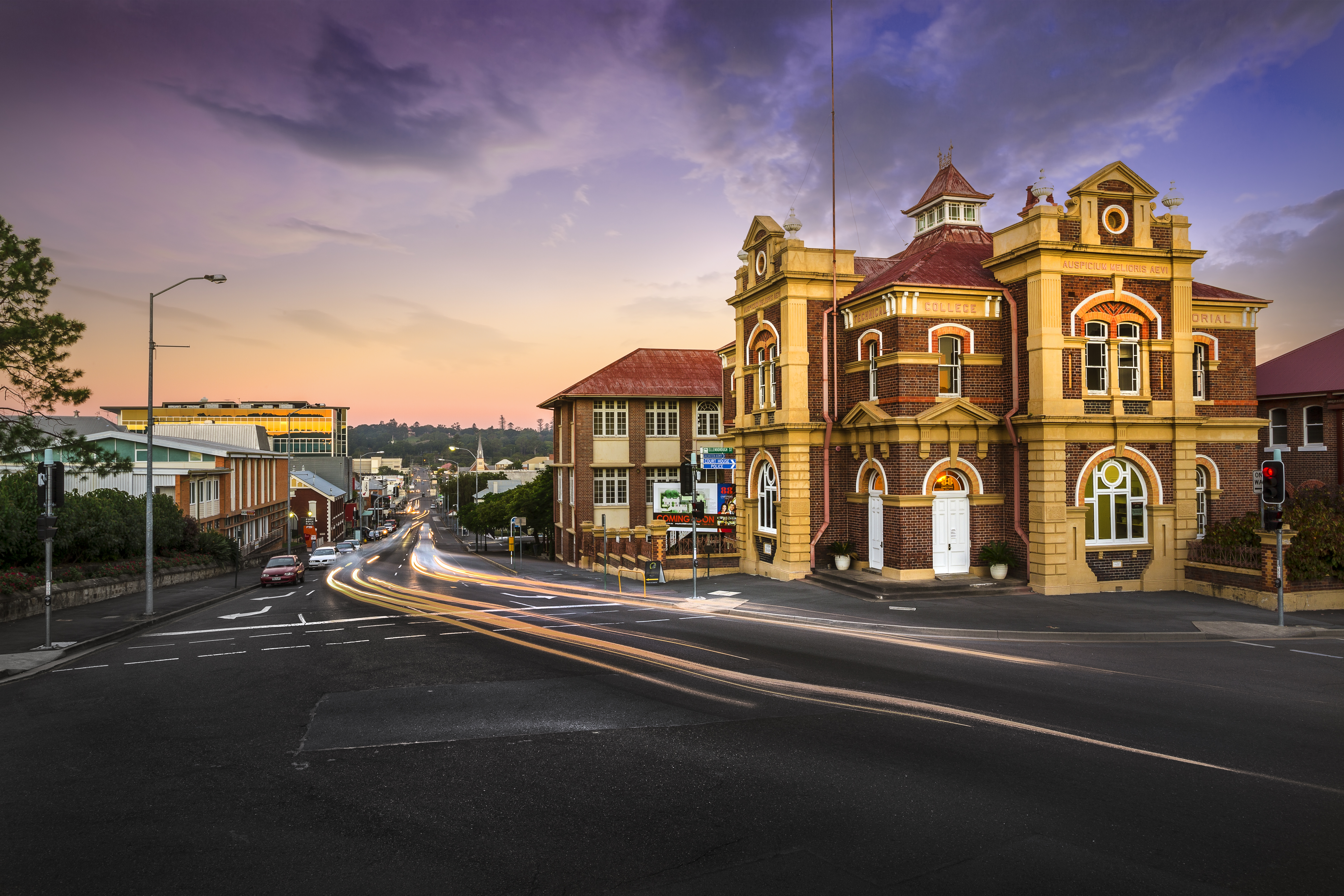
- Former Ipswich Technical College, 2015

- Location within Queensland Location within Australia
- 27.6154°S 152.7578°E
- Location: 88 Limestone Street, Ipswich, City of Ipswich, Queensland, Australia

History
- Design period: 1870s–1890s (late 19th century)
- Built: 1897–1937

Site notes
- Architect: George Brockwell Gill

Queensland Heritage Register
- Official name: Queen Victoria Silver Jubilee Memorial Technical College, Ipswich TAFE College, Ipswich Technical College
- Type: state heritage (built)
- Designated: 21 October 1992
- Reference no.: 600586
- Significant period: 1890s (historical); 1890s–1940s (social); 1890s–1910s (fabric technical college); 1910s–1920s (fabric)
- Significant components: school/school room, classroom/classroom block/teaching area, workshop
- Builders: H Woodford

Queen Victoria Silver Jubilee Memorial Technical College is a heritage-listed technical college at 88 Limestone Street, Ipswich, City of Ipswich, Queensland, Australia. It was designed by architect George Brockwell Gill and built from 1897 to 1937. It is also known as Ipswich TAFE College and Ipswich Technical College. It was added to the Queensland Heritage Register on 21 October 1992.

== History ==
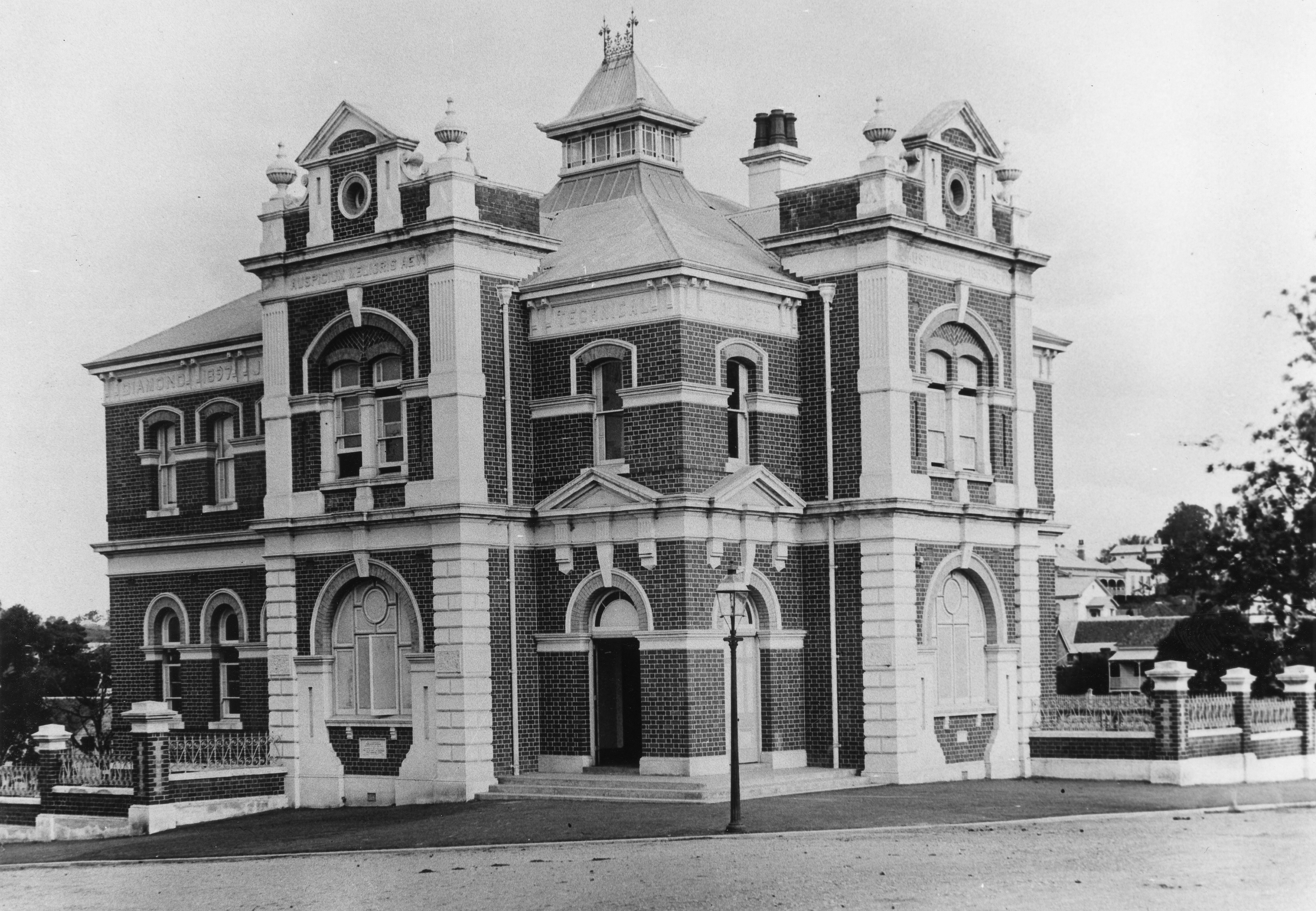
Ipswich Technical College, 1906

The Queen Victoria Silver Jubilee Memorial Technical College was opened by the Governor of Queensland, Lord Lamington on 4 June 1901 at a time when technical education was becoming firmly established throughout Queensland. Queensland's first technical college was established in Brisbane in 1882 and in 1898 The Brisbane Technical College Act was passed which governed only the Brisbane Technical College. Technical colleges established outside Brisbane during this period were initiated and run by independent boards not bound by statutes or regulations and the Ipswich Technical College was the first of these to be established and to construct its own purpose built college. Other independent technical colleges to follow Ipswich were Warwick (1906), Mount Morgan (1909), and Toowoomba (1910).

Ipswich commenced running technical classes in August 1891 after a public meeting was held in June where community leaders including the Mayor of the Ipswich Town Council, the Headmaster of the Ipswich Grammar School and the Chairman of The Queensland Times accepted a Government offer of £250 to begin technical education at Ipswich. Prior to 1891 the only form of technical education available in Ipswich was through a limited range of courses at the Ipswich School of Arts.

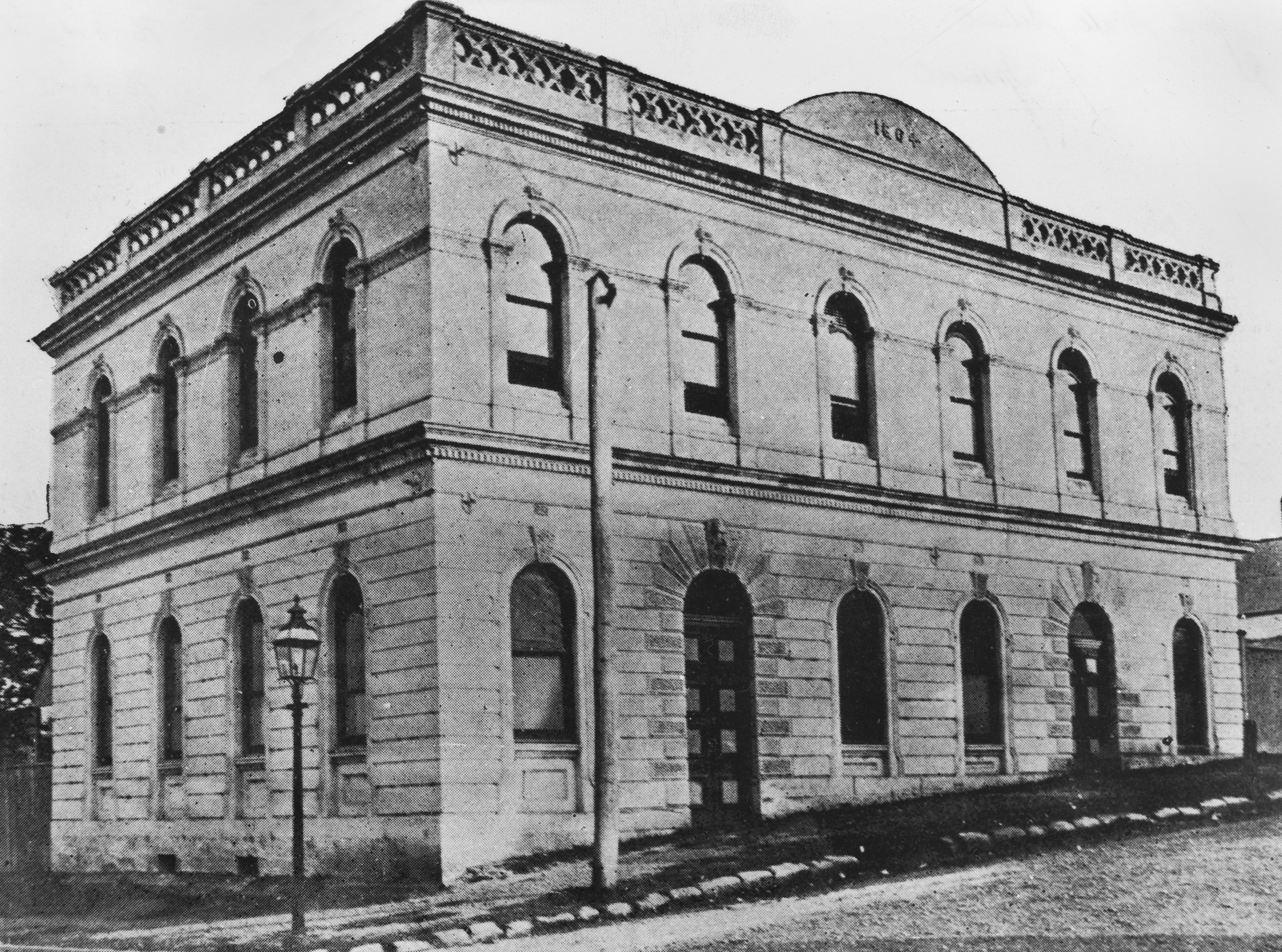
Ipswich Middle State School, corner of Bell and Union Street (now demolished)

The technical classes began with book-keeping, drawing, algebra, and geometry at the Ipswich Middle State School, in rented premises and even in a rented foundry. Arrangements were also made to include dress-making, cookery, ambulance work, geography, history, Latin and English to the syllabus. The financial difficulties bought on by the depression of the early 1890s forced the college to close between 1893 and 1896. It reopened in 1897 in O'Sullivan's Buildings in Brisbane Street. In the same year the first classes in coal mining began.

At a public meeting in January 1897, it was decided to commemorate the Silver Jubilee of Queen Victoria by erecting a new technical college. The local community raised £1000, and with a government grant of £2000 work began on a site granted by the city council in the Central Gardens. The college, a two-storey masonry structure with a basement was designed by prominent Ipswich architect George Brockwell Gill. The contractor was H Woodford and the brickwork was undertaken by G Williams.

The architect, George Brockwell Gill, designed many of the grand residences and public buildings in Ipswich from the 1880s to the 1930s. Some of his works include "Brynhyfryd" for Lewis Thomas (1889–90), Ipswich Girls' Grammar School (1890/91), St Paul's Rectory (1895), Ipswich Club House (1916), the Hotel Metropole (1906), and supervision of the construction of the Walter Burley Griffin Incinerator in 1936. Gill emigrated from London and settled in Ipswich in 1886 where he commenced work as an architect for the firm of Samuel Shenton. Gill took over Shenton's practice in 1889 when Shenton retired. Gill had been elected Associate of the Queensland Institute of Architects in 1904 and Fellow by 1913. He was its Vice-President in 1914–16 and President in 1918–19.

At this time the college was managed by a local committee with local knowledge and as various committee members were connected with the railway workshops or mines the curriculum was able to meet the needs of the city.

By 1902 the Board of Technical Education, created by thirty-four technical colleges throughout Queensland, was established to regulate and increase technical education and advise the Minister for Public Instruction. In 1903 annual examinations in Ipswich which were previously run by the local College Committee were placed under the control of the Board of Technical Education. In 1905 this Board was abolished when a separate branch of the department was established.

The Ipswich student population expanded rapidly and by 1910 an electrical laboratory had been added to the basement. In 1910 the City Council also agreed that the site on which the College was situated be vested in the Minister for Public Instruction.

A lack of complete courses was remedied in 1912 with the introduction of the Mine Manager's Certificate course (issued by the Department of Mines) and the Mechanical and Electrical Diploma Course (issued by the University of Queensland).

The building program was continued with the establishment in 1915 of a Domestic Science area on the top floor of the original college building (still evident today) and the completion of a brick building fronting Ellenborough Street in 1917. The top floor was devoted to the Commercial Day School, Engineering Diploma courses and laboratories and the ground floor was occupied by the Lecture Hall, Library, Dressmaking Room, Drawing Office and Teachers' Rooms. The basement was occupied by the Engineering Workshops, Storeroom, Patternmaking Shop, Plumbing Shop and Blacksmith's Shop.

In 1922 the Domestic Science School, the Commercial Day School and the Preparatory Trade School were given High School Status and students were prepared for the University Junior Exams. In 1924 a new building was opened to house the new high school classes and in 1930 the three separate schools were merged to form the Ipswich Technical High School. This new building was extended in 1941 and stands visible from Limestone Street.

In 1937 a workshops building was constructed on the southern side of the High School building which was later used as the Mining, Science and Student Amenities area. This building now has a canteen on the ground floor and the top floor is vacant with evidence of science laboratories still extant.

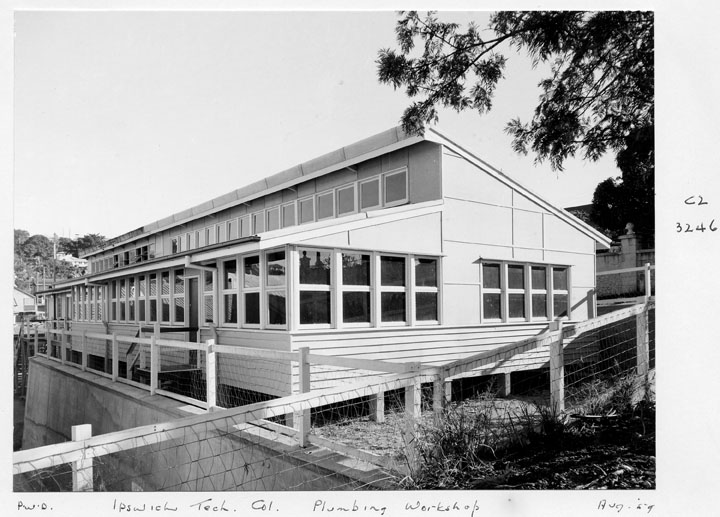
Plumbing Workshop, August 1959

During the Second World War the facilities of the college were used to train a large number of Defence Trainees. The college expanded again in 1944 when a new complex was constructed on the west side of Ellenborough Street to house a Machine Shop and in 1945 a Woodworking Shop was opened and in 1947 a Plumbing Shop was opened on the same site. Both the plumbing workshop and the teachers' common room were built by the Commonwealth Reconstruction Trainees as part of their training program. (This site is not included in the heritage listing.)

From 1948 the College Committee was in financial trouble on a number of occasions and in July 1951 the control of the college administration was taken over by the Queensland Government. In 1962 the Technical High School was separated from the Technical College and the Ipswich State High School was established at Brassal.

The Technical College was later absorbed into the Bremer TAFE and operated as a secondary campus to the main campus in Bundamba.

In 2014, a redevelopment of the site was commenced to create a commercial, dining and retail precinct known as "188 Limestone". The Pumpyard microbrewery operates from the basement.

== Description ==
The Queen Victoria Silver Jubilee Memorial Technical College Complex is located adjacent to the Ipswich central business district on a 4,092-square-metre (44,050 sq ft) site bounded by Limestone Street to the north, South Street to the south, park reserve to the east and Ellenborough Street to the west. The complex comprises four main buildings which are complementary in design, scale and form and several smaller single storey outbuildings that house toilet facilities and stores. The technical college site also includes two very large shade trees, on the Ellenborough Street boundary.

=== 1901 Queen Victoria Silver Jubilee Memorial Technical College ===
The first and most decorative of the buildings, the 1901 Queen Victoria Silver Jubilee Memorial Technical College is the cornerstone of the complex both in its location and commanding presence of its design and articulation.

The 1901 Queen Victoria Silver Jubilee Memorial Technical College building is located at the corner of Limestone and Ellenborough Streets. This intact stately two storey brick masonry building with basement has facades heavily ornamented with an eclectic combination of elements and details including the use of polychromatic tuck pointed brickwork and painted cement rendered details. The hipped roof is of red painted corrugated iron with a rectangular roof lantern which is surmounted by cast iron cresting.

The building entrance at the corner of Limestone and Ellenborough streets is symmetrically framed by identical breakfronts projecting toward the street alignment and between which the stairs to the foyer level are contained. The entrance comprises pairs of five panel timber doors under round arched fanlights accentuated by contrasting brick voussoirs, cement rendered label moulds and imposts and pedimented, bracketed string coursing to each street frontage. The ground floor fenestration comprises stilted round arched windows with five light fanlights and double hung sashes with light coloured brickwork voussoirs and cement rendered label moulds and imposts. The first floor fenestration comprises segmental headed double hung windows with five light sashes accentuated with dichromatic brickwork arches, cement rendered label moulds and imposts and contrasting brick string coursing at sill height The entablature which is punctuated with pairs of cement rendered eaves brackets bears the words DIAMOND 1897 JUBILEE TECHNICAL COLLEGE MEMORIAL in raised lettering to the frieze along the length of the two facades from the north east corner of the building to the south west.

Each of the breakfronts is heavily embellished with contrasting tuck pointed brickwork and cement rendered details. Cement rendered elements include the plinths, pilasters decorated with quoin stones to the ground floor and fluting to the upper section at the first floor level, sills, brackets, imposts, key stones, entablature parapet, pedimented gable and finials. The gable includes bullseye louvred vents.

The fenestration to the breakfronts includes a round arched window with eleven lights to the ground floor and pairs of segmental arched windows with fanlight and double hung sashes within a single segmental arch. The frieze to each breakfront bears the Latin words AUSPICIUM MELIORIS AEVI which roughly translates as "command better lives" in raised lettering. At ground floor level, commemorative marble plaques with lead lettering detail the opening, architect and builder details.

A brick masonry fence with cement rendered plinth and capping and dichromatic piers and iron balustrading encloses the immediate grounds to the east and south of the breakfronts.

The 1901 college building is very intact and houses offices, a staffroom and a class room on the ground floor; additional offices and a dining room, kitchen and scullery associated with the domestic science facilities on the first floor and store rooms, a staff room and a class room are located in the basement. The scullery houses early sinks, benches and draining boards.

The entrance foyer opens into a large stair hall that is naturally lit by a roof lantern and central light well with sloping timber boarded ceiling. The elaborately detailed timber stair is an open newel type with two quarter space landings providing access to the first floor. The top landing curves to frame the stairwell and the angled masonry walls accentuate this feature. These main stairs lead to the first floor only. The rear stair provides access to all three levels (access to the basement has been boarded up) and another single flight stair off the corridor leads to the basement from the ground floor.

=== 1917 General and Commercial Building ===
The 1917 General and Commercial building is located in Ellenborough street adjacent to the 1901 college and is a simply decorated two storey brick masonry building with full height basement below street level. This building is constructed of tuck pointed brown brickwork relieved with red brick round arched fenestration at basement and ground level and segmental arched windows to the first floor all with cement rendered sills and double hung windows. The roof is divided into three bays of red painted corrugated iron hipped roofs with boarded eaves and the entrance is pronounced at the roof line by a raised parapet at the intersection of two bays. A steep narrow fire stair is located on the southern elevation and its landing is located about one metre above street level.

Access to the building is from Ellenborough street and the entrance hall, which houses the main stair, extends through the width of the building to a secondary timber stair attached on the eastern wall. The interior of this building generally comprises timber floors with rendered masonry walls and a fibrous cement sheeted ceiling with timber cover battens. The ground floor houses the library (which contains early fittings), sewing room, class room, staff room and auditorium. The first floor houses additional class rooms and a staff room and the basement houses an office, store and the engineering workshops which still contain some equipment. Borrowed lights in the footpath have been concealed with bitumen but are still evident in the western wall of the basement.

=== 1924 Classroom Block ===
The 1924 Classroom Block is located on Limestone Street to the east of the 1901 Technical College building. It too is complementary in its scale and form and materials and as it is at the lower end of the site presents three storeys to Limestone Street. The Classroom Block comprises red brick tuck pointed masonry piers relieved with infill panels of rendered masonry below casement windows with fanlights and cement rendered flat window hoods. Each panel contains fenestration that comprises three eight-light casements with four-light centre pivoting fanlights above. It has a red painted corrugated iron roof with lined eaves. Floors are timber framed and lined and ceilings have a fibrous cement lining with timber batten cover strips.

Classrooms divided by partition walls of timber with a v-jointed tongue and groove board lining are located on each level and are very intact. A few pieces of original furniture survive. The classroom block is connected at first floor level to the technical college building to the west and workshops to the south by timber walkways and verandah.

=== 1937 Workshops Building ===
The 1937 workshops building is a two storey building of the same construction as the 1924 classroom block and is located on the southern side of the Class Room block building. The open workshop area on the ground level is still evident although now used as a Canteen. The laboratory that was housed on the first floor is no longer operational but the benches and laboratory equipment survive. The timber roof trusses in this building are exposed and the ceiling of tongue and groove v-jointed boards follows the rake of the roof.

== Heritage listing ==
Queen Victoria Silver Jubilee Memorial Technical College was listed on the Queensland Heritage Register on 21 October 1992 having satisfied the following criteria.

The place is important in demonstrating the evolution or pattern of Queensland's history.

The Queen Victoria Silver Jubilee Memorial Technical College is important in demonstrating the evolution of Queensland's history as it illustrates the development and growth of technical and higher education throughout the State. It is also significant in demonstrating Australia's close ties with the British Empire at the turn of the 20th century as it was constructed as a memorial to the Diamond Jubilee of Queen Victoria.

The place is also important in demonstrating the development of the civic centre of Ipswich.

The place is important in demonstrating the principal characteristics of a particular class of cultural places.

All structures on the site are a good example of technical college structures of the varying periods of construction which evolved in response to progressive thinking in the design and planning of educational institutions.

The place is important because of its aesthetic significance.

The original 1901 building is of considerable architectural merit, and its form and fabric illustrate a skilled design approach It also displays fine quality of workmanship in the detailing of its materials and finishes. The whole site, including the mature trees on the property, makes an important contribution to the streetscapes of Limestone and Ellenborough Streets and the surrounding area, which includes a number of significant civic buildings central to the city.

The place has a strong or special association with a particular community or cultural group for social, cultural or spiritual reasons.

The place is significant for its association with the Ipswich community being a principal centre of education since 1901.

The place has a special association with the life or work of a particular person, group or organisation of importance in Queensland's history.

The original 1901 building is a significant example of the work of G Brockwell Gill, who was responsible for many significant civic, commercial and domestic buildings in Ipswich.
