= Helen Plummer Phillips =

Australian educator, missionary, and philanthropist

Headmistress, St Catherine's School
- In office 1884-1890

Missionary, CMS Australia (then Church Missionary Association NSW)
- In office 1892-1905

Personal life
- Born: 1850 Devon, England
- Died: 1929 (aged 78–79)
- Known for: Education of children and women in Sydney and Ceylon (Sri Lanka)
- Occupation: Educator and missionary

Religious life
- Religion: Christian
- Denomination: Anglican (then known as Church of England)
- Founder of: University of Sydney Women's Society CMS Australia mission and schools in Dodanduwa Sinhalese Women Teachers Vernacular Training School, Colombo

Helen Plummer Phillips (Note: Also known as Helen Phillips, Helen P. Phillips and last name occasionally spelled with a single "l" as Philips. As her author name for her memoir, From Sydney to Delhi... and most sources spell with a double "ll", this entry uses Phillips as the last name.) (1850–1929) (Note: In secondary sources her birth year is sometimes shown as 1851 possibly based on the 1861 Census which estimated her birth year. The official birth registration and baptismal records give 19 November 1850 as her birthdate.) was an educator, missionary, and philanthropist. She was the first missionary sent from Australia by the newly formed Church Missionary Association NSW (Note: Then became known as Church Mission/ary Society, now CMS Australia.) (now CMS Australia) in 1892. She was the first tutor for women students at the University of Sydney and formed the University of Sydney Women's Society in 1891 and established its settlement work, mentoring the women students until the Women's College was built and the first principal arrived. Phillips was a principal of St. Catherine's School, Waverley NSW, an advocate for women's full education, and a benefactor of St Luke's Anglican Community Church, Medlow Bath, NSW.

== Life and ministry ==
=== Early life ===
Helen Phillips was born on 19 November 1850 to a relatively well-off family in Shaugh Prior, Devon, England and grew up in Lee Moor House. She was baptised in the Plymouth circuit Ebenezer Wesleyan Methodist chapel in 1850 by James Mowat. Her father was William Phillips and mother Mary Ann Phillips (née James). Her father owned the Lee Moor Porcelain Clay Company, and the rights to use the Morley Clay works in partnership with his son, John (Helen's older brother). William died in 1861 when Helen was ten years old, and the occupation of both her mother Mary and older brother John was listed on the census of that year as "China Clay Merchant and Brick Manufacturer employing 89 men". John Phillips had to sell the company and mining leases after his father's death but went on to establish Aller Vale pottery.

Phillips graduated from Bedford College, London and became a teacher, a senior assistant mistress at Sheffield Girls' High, England. Her younger brother Richard Henry Phillips emigrated to Australia in 1884 and became Rector of the Anglican parish of Taree NSW then Canon of Christ Church Cathedral, Newcastle. Helen was invited to be headmistress of St. Catherine's School, Waverley by Bishop Alfred Barry, third bishop of Sydney so she also sailed to Australia later in 1884.

=== Educator ===
==== St. Catherine’s School, Waverley ====
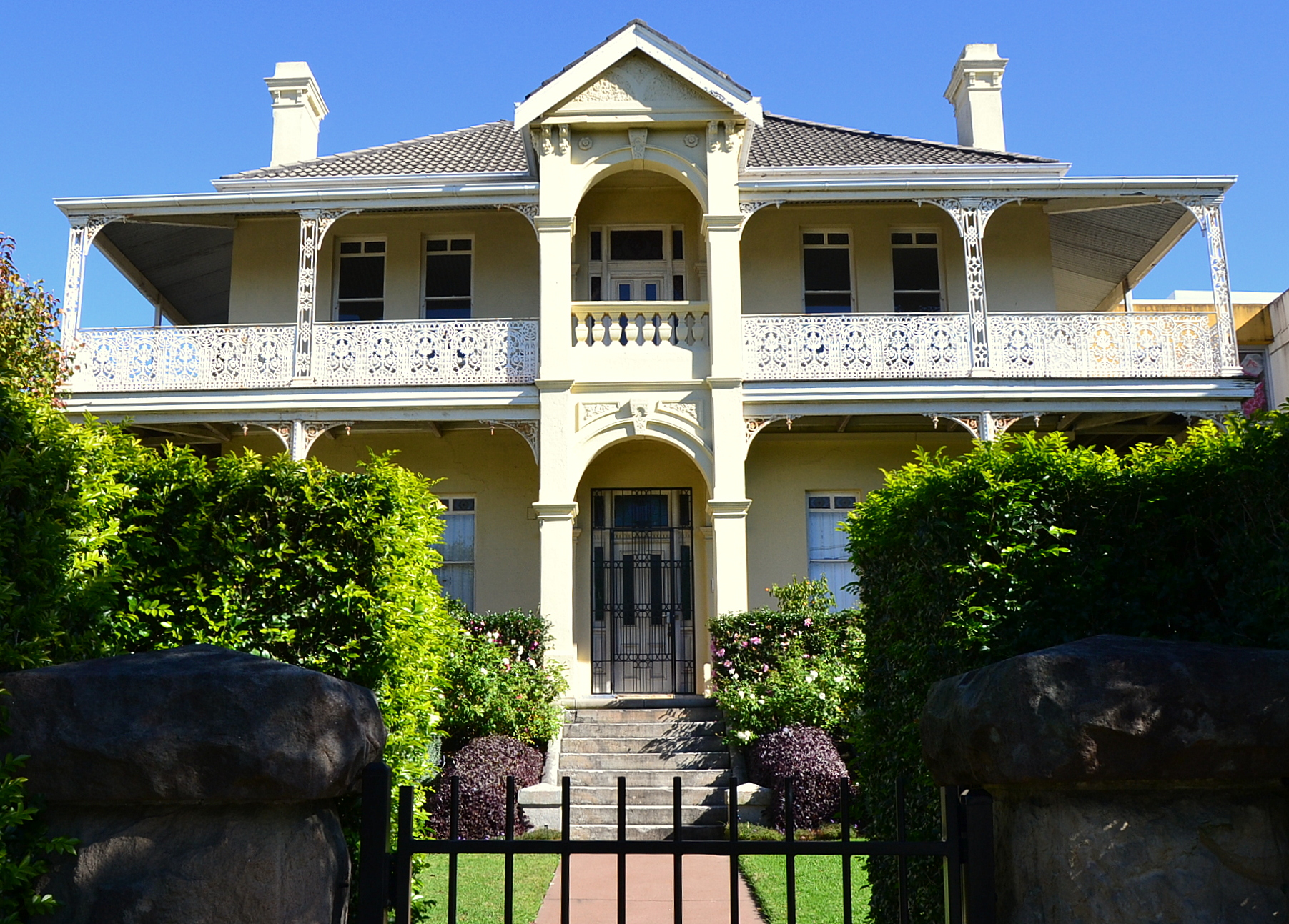
St Catherine's School, Waverley

From September 1884 to 1890, she was the principal of St. Catherine's School, Waverley. The school was initially for the daughters of clergy but expanded to accept other girls as pupils. A later archivist of the school described Phillips as: "Affectionately known as ‘Phill’, she was an inspiring headmistress who was well ahead of her time."

She was known as a strong supporter of education for women, a progressive headmistress, and expanded the curriculum, encouraging the students to undertake public service and university entrance examinations. In 1884 she donated an art studio, "The Studio", to the school so that future artist Eirene Mort made good use of it when she attended St Catherine's from 1889 to 1897. The studio is now the school's museum. Later in 1914 Phillips asked Mort to illustrate her memoir. She introduced the school's motto In Christo Thesauri Sapientiae at ScientiaI, "In Christ are hidden all the treasures of wisdom and knowledge". She fostered her students' interest in the arts bringing in music (Phillips played the pianoforte), drawing and language teachers as well as science teachers such as Fanny Hunt, the first woman to graduate with a Bachelor of Science from the University of Sydney in 1888. In 1890, Phillips wrote to a newspaper asking for an afternoon recital of the Halle-Neruda concert rather than the crowded evening concerts so she could take more of her students.

==== University of Sydney ====
In July 1890, she wrote a letter to the editor of the Sydney Morning Herald in response to an article written by a man saying that women had not achieved anything great, especially in poetry, drama and music. In her letter, she mentioned that Phillipa Fawcett had earned the highest marks in mathematics at Cambridge University after gaining a scholarship to Newnham College. Phillips supported the establishment of the proposed Women's College at Sydney University to similarly support women's education and wrote to both The Sydney Morning Herald and The Bulletin. A history of the Women's College states that generally, the Sydney Morning Herald was supportive of the proposed Women's College and reported favourably on the progress of fundraising for it while The Bulletin was generally derisive of the need for a Women's College.

In 1890, she was visited by two university professors who asked her to become the first tutor to women students at the University of Sydney. She made a short visit of a few months in 1891 to England to visit family and old friends at Oxford and Cambridge Universities including "Katie" (Catherine Sharpe Parker who married W.H. Gaskell) who had been a fellow student at Bedford College, and Phillippa Fawcett. With the Gaskells, Phillips sat at the head table of Newnham College and inquired how the college supported women students at university. She also visited another younger brother, William Inchbold Phillips, Priest in Charge, St John's College Mission (Lady Margaret Church) Walworth where she learned more about the work of the college mission. The mission involved university students in charitable works and educating poorer people in the area in the settlement movement tradition.

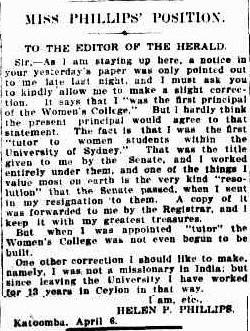
Helen Phillip's letter to the Sydney Morning Herald, 1911

From 1891 to 1892, she became the first tutor to women students at Sydney University. In accepting the offer of this position, she resigned as principal of St Catherine's and postponed her intention to travel to northern India to help a missionary friend, Elizabeth Clay. In most official university sources she is listed as "Tutor to the Women Students–Helen P. Phillips (Bedford College)" under the Faculty of Medicine while in a few other sources she is described as the first acting principal of Women's College, University of Sydney but she was not the first principal who was Louisa Macdonald. Phillips herself corrected that in a letter to the Sydney Morning Herald in 1911. The statement of duties given to Phillips by the university said that she was to be "a guardian and friend" to the women students. While she was a tutor at the university, Phillips instigated the formation of its Women's Society which helped disadvantaged people in Sydney, visited patients in hospitals and set up night schools particularly focussing on a night school for girls at Millers Point, North Sydney. Lady Jersey, the governor's wife, supported her in setting up the society and its committee presidents and vice-presidents were other women of status in Sydney such as Lady Manning (wife of the Chancellor) and Mrs CB Fairfax. Phillips was succeeded as tutor by Jane Foss Russell (later Barff) in 1892.

=== Educator and missionary ===
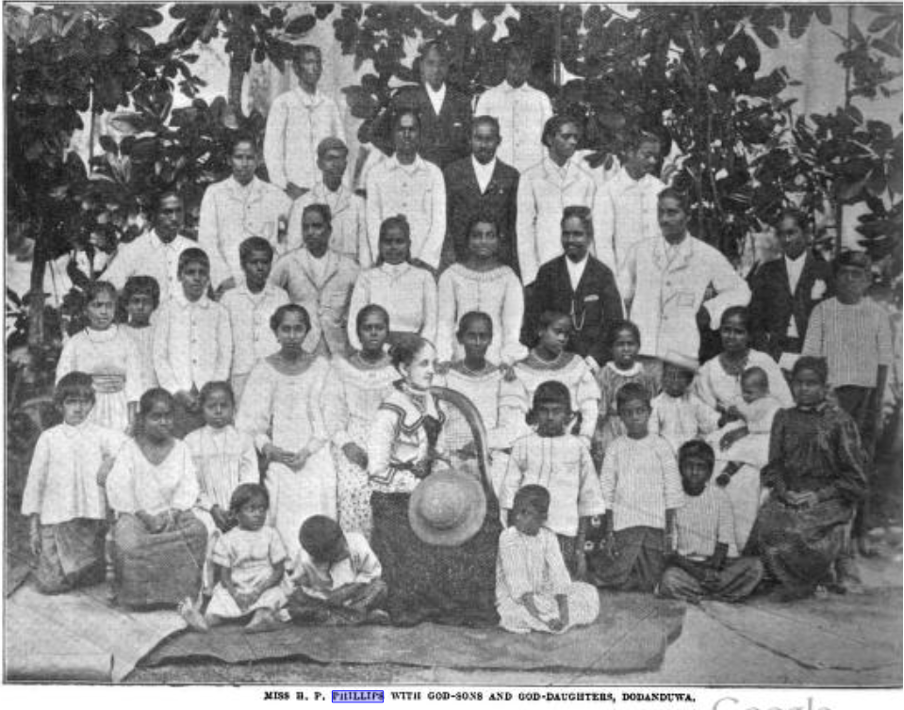
Helen Phillips and her students at Dondanduwa

From 1892 to 1905 Phillips spent 13 years in Ceylon (now Sri Lanka) as a missionary where she founded industrial schools for boys and girls and established the Sinhalese Women Teachers Vernacular Training School in Colombo after she returned from her second furlough in 1904. Phillips mostly used her own funds to pay for her travel and the missionary work. In 1897 and 1900 she was described as an "honorary" missionary who bought the land for the first mission compound at Dodanduwa then gave the title deeds to the Church Missionary Society. The Ceylonese government, under British rule, also paid the schools a grant for every student successful in their examinations. Meanwhile, in Australia, toys, useful articles and funds were collected in Anglican churches to send to "Miss Helen Phillips' Mission Station in Ceylon".

David Weerasooriya, (Note: Spelled Weerasuria by Phillips and some early sources.) Christian "Chieftain" or "Aratchi" (Note: Spelled Aratchi by Phillips but otherwise Arachchi) of the Buddhist district and village of Dodanduwa and father of Arnolis Weerasooriya, lent her his house for three years until she could build one of her own and the mission compound school. In the 1903 edition of The Church Missionary Gleaner and in her memoir, Phillips described the boys and girls at the Dodanduwa schools as her godsons and goddaughters. The subjects taught at the schools such as wood carving, bookbinding, printing, lacemaking, and tailoring were intended to help the children gain employment and pass government teaching or trade examinations so they could earn a living or become teachers in the mission schools. Phillips learned the Sinhalese language and lacemaking so she could be the girls' teacher and taught the boys wood carving until she was able to train local teachers to take over. The girl's lacemaking won a silver medal at the Paris Exhibition of 1900. Phillips said she had to work hard to persuade families to allow their daughters to continue education instead of being married at a young age or kept at home. In her memoir, Phillips describes the wedding of Dorcas, who lived with her as a young girl so she could keep attending school.

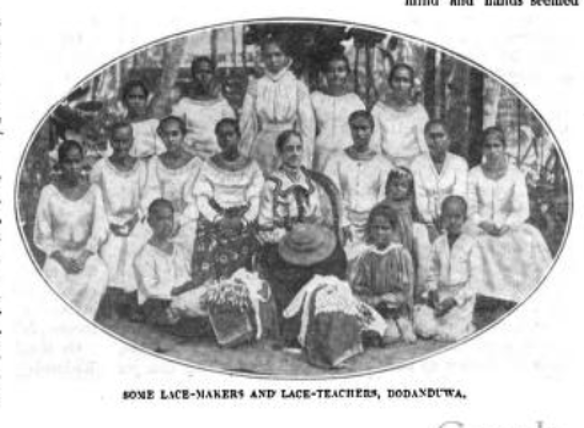
Helen Phillips, lacemaking teachers and students

Phillips returned on furlough to Australia in 1898 after spending six months in London in 1897, giving addresses at Cambridge University and elsewhere. At an address she made in St Philips Church, Bethnall Green, the Bishop of London was the chair. On returning to Australia in 1898 for the next leg of her missionary talks she addressed the Church Missionary Association in Sydney about her work in Ceylon, visited her brother in Taree, twice giving a missionary talk there, and exhibited the lacework in Melbourne. In 1904 on her second furlough, she stayed again in Taree as well as Sydney and spoke in the regional towns of Goulburn and Wagga Wagga. In Sydney she addressed the public meeting for the 79th anniversary of the NSW Church Missionary Society, presided over by the Archbishop of Sydney with Bishop William Ridley speaking on the same platform.

Phillips retired from the mission field in 1905 because of ill health and returned to England, then Australia. In 1911 the old girls of St Catherine's school arranged a tea party welcome home for her at the Queen Victoria Club.

=== Anglican church benefactor and retirement ===
In 1885 Phillips had bought land in Blackheath, in the Blue Mountains of NSW, where she built a holiday house which she kept until 1893. After retiring from missionary work, she bought another house in 1913 in Blackheath but maintained her connections with Ceylon. That same year she re-visited Ceylon and then wrote a memoir of her time there when she returned to Blackheath in 1914. She had the book illustrated by her former pupil, Eirene Mort, and printed by the boys in the printing workshop at Dodanduwa and dedicated it to Australian schoolgirls. The book was first intended as a textbook for girls thinking of becoming missionaries.

In 1919 there was an exhibition of CMS mission products in the chapter house St Andrews Cathedral, Sydney. Phillips staffed the Ceylon stall displaying the crafts of her old schools at Dodanduwa

She attended St Luke's Anglican church at Medlow Bath near Blackheath and became a significant benefactor. Although Anglican, it was also known as an ecumenical and community church. The small weatherboard church, now privately owned, still has its donated stained glass windows, the southern one donated by Phillips. The motto on the ribbon around the crown reads, "The cross that Jesus carried, He carried as your due. The crown that Jesus weareth, He weareth it for you" and the dedication under reads "A thank offering from H.P.P 1913". She also donated a baptismal font and arranged for other church furniture to be made by the "C.M.S. Industrial School boys, Dodanduwa"; a carved teak wood lectern, prayer desk, carved teak communion rails, and litany desk. The furniture items were donated to parishioners and other churches on the closure of St Luke's. During the first World War in Blackheath she established the Blackheath Voluntary Aid Detachment.

== Death and legacy ==
Helen Phillips died at Gordon, Sydney NSW on 25 May 1929, her funeral service was held at St John's Church of England, Gordon and she is buried at Macquarie Park Cemetery, Ryde, NSW (then Northern Suburbs General Cemetery)

The Anglican historian Woolston sums up Phillips legacy as: "...with profound Christian faith she was a leader when women were just beginning to emerge from educational poverty."

Her legacy was:

- education of girls and women in 19th Century Australia
- entrance of more women students into the University of Sydney from St Catherine's school and through her early support as the first women's tutor
- establishment of the University of Sydney Women's Society and its settlement work
- teacher training for Sinhalese women
- trades and teacher training for Dodanduwa boys and girls
- establishment of a CMS mission in Dodanduwa in Ceylon/Sri Lanka
- furniture and stained glass window for St Luke's Anglican church, Medlow Bath, NSW.
