= Mary Dunstan Wilson =

Australian Sister of Charity and educator

Personal life
- Born: Ella Wilson; 21 August 1870 Maitland, New South Wales, Australia
- Died: 29 March 1959 (aged 88) Darlinghurst, Sydney, Australia

Religious life
- Religion: Catholicism

Mary Dunstan Wilson (born Ella, 1870–1959) was an Australian educator and member of the Sisters of Charity of Australia.

== Early life and education ==
Ella Wilson was born on 21 August 1870, in Maitland, New South Wales, Australia. Her parents were Frederick Alfred Adolphus Wilson and Jemima Duncan Wilson (née Thomson). Her father worked as a bank accountant.

Wilson attended the University of Sydney, earning a Bachelor of Arts in 1892 and a Master of Arts in 1895. It was still quite uncommon for women to earn advanced degrees at the time. The first two women graduated from the University of Sydney in 1985, only seven years before Wilson began her studies.

== Career ==
Like many of the first women university graduates, Wilson became a teacher. She began her career teaching at the Ipswich Girls Grammar School and other grammar schools in Queensland. She taught swimming as well as the general curriculum.

In 1900, Wilson converted to Catholicism. She was drawn to the religious life, and joined the Sisters of Charity of Australia, professing her final vows in 1905. The Sisters of Charity were the first Catholic religious sisters to establish a community in Australia; they arrived in 1838. By the 1900s, the Sisters of Charity were well established in New South Wales, and had a positive reputation for their commitment to education and health care. Upon joining the order, Wilson took on the religious name Mary Dunstan.

In 1872, the Australian government had ceased funding denominational schools, and began expanding public schools. Catholic schools began to rely heavily on religious orders to provide teaching and curriculum development. Sister Dunstan, as she was now known, was sent by her order to study at the University of Melbourne, where she earned a Diploma in Education in 1908. She then taught at St. Vincent's Training School, affiliated with the order's Mother House in Sydney. In 1915, Sister Dunstan became the mistress of method. In this role, she lectured and authored articles and books on education, methodology, and other subjects. She greatly influenced the teaching at St. Vincent's for the next twenty-seven years.

One of Sister Dunstan's more notable books was an introduction to psychology, entitled How our Minds Work, which was published in 1925. It was well-regarded as an introductory text, and commended by the school inspectors, who evaluated public and private education in Victoria on behalf of the government. Sister Dunstan also authored Social Studies for Secondary School Pupils and Those at Home in 1939 and The Junior Bible and Church History in 1941.

From 1942 to 1948, Mother Dunstan served as the general counselor and assistant to the superior general of her order. She advised the superior general on educational matters.

== Death ==
After being cared for in the Sacred Heart hospice in Darlinghurst, Mother Dunstan died on 29 March 1959. She was 88 years old.
