= Agnes McWhinney =

Agnes McWhinney (1891–1987) was a solicitor in Queensland, Australia. She was one of the first female solicitors in Australia, following Victoria's Flos Greig (admitted to practice in 1905) and Anna Brennan (in 1911).

== Early life ==
Agnes McWhinney was born on 25 September 1891 at Ravenswood Junction (now known as Mingela) in Queensland, the daughter of Andrew McWhinney and his wife Margaret (née McIntyre). She attended Townsville Grammar School.

== Career ==
McWhinney's ambition was to become a doctor, but the cost of attending medical school in Sydney was very expensive. Her brother Joseph McWhinney was completing his Articles of Clerkship at solicitors, Wilson and Ryan, in Townsville and he persuaded her to pursue the law instead. In 1910, Wilson and Ryan accepted Agnes McWhinney as an articled clerk.

Although Justice Pope Cooper of the Northern Supreme Court of Queensland disliked the idea of women entering the legal profession, he was unable to find any basis to refuse her and so admitted her to practise as a solicitor on 7 December 1915. However, she then had to repeatedly protest to be paid a comparable wage to male solicitors.

== Later life ==
On 23 March 1920, McWhinney married Lowell Mason Osborne and discontinued her paid employment and only did legal work as a community service. On 5 October 1926, McWhinney was present when Katherine Elizabeth McGregor became the first female barrister in Queensland when she was admitted to the Queensland Bar Association.

Agnes Osborne died in Brisbane on 2 August 1985. She was buried in Toowong Cemetery.

== Legacy ==
The Queensland Law Society has an annual Agnes McWhinney Award to recognise the contributions of a female lawyer.

== See also ==
- First women lawyers around the world
