= Eleanor Greenham =

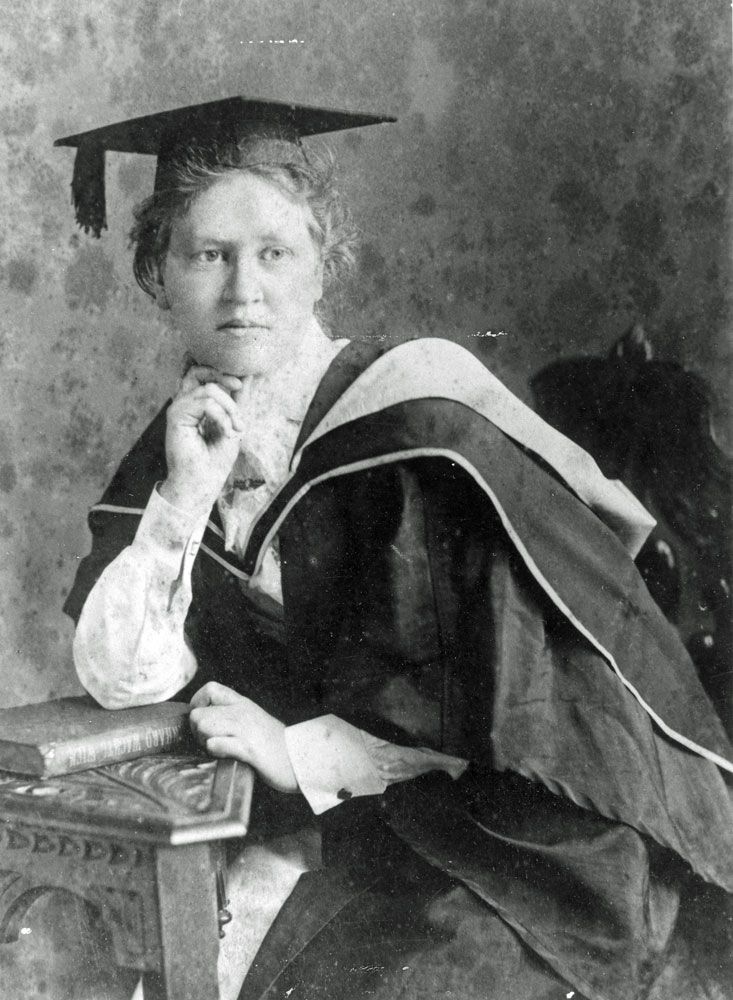
Eleanor Greenham, thought to be after Graduation Ceremony, Sydney, 1901

Eleanor Constance Greenham (15 April 1874 – 31 December 1957) was the first woman born in Queensland, Australia, to be a registered physician.

== Early life ==
Greenham was born in Ipswich, Queensland on 15 April 1874, the daughter of John Greenham and Eleanor (née Johnstone). Her father was a draper and later ran a general store in Ipswich. Greenham attended Ipswich Central Girls’ and Infants School and from 1889 to 1890 she attended Brisbane Girls Grammar School. She won prizes in English and natural history. Ipswich Girls’ Grammar School opened in 1892, and Greenham became the first pupil of this school. She won prizes in science and completed her senior public examination, in anticipation of undertaking studies toward university entrance.

She moved to Sydney in 1895, to study at the University of Sydney where she resided at The Women's College. After studying toward a B.A. for the first year, Greenham was then able to proceed toward medical studies, taking her M.B. and Ch.M. in 1901. She was the first Queensland-born woman to graduate in medicine.

== Medical career ==
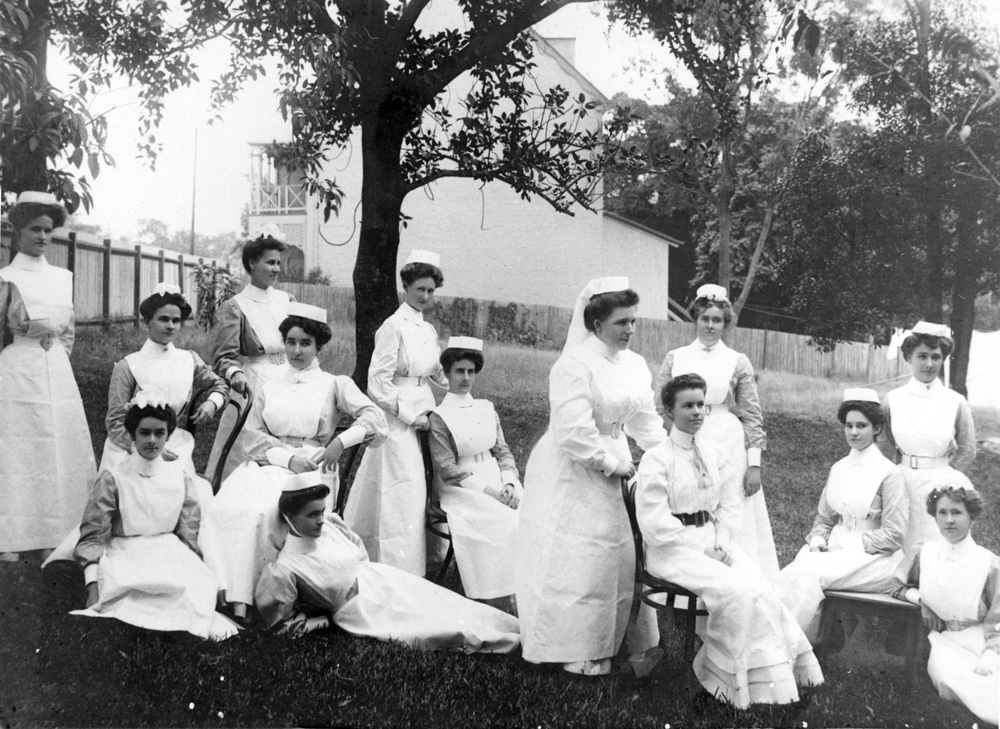
Lady Bowen Lying In Hospital, Graduation class of 1907, Eleanor Greenham is front right (not in nurse uniform)

Greenham was registered to practise medicine in Queensland in 1901, working at the Lady Bowen Hospital, Brisbane. She moved into private practice in Brisbane from 1903, near Dr Lillian Cooper. Despite opposition from male colleagues, Greenham was a successful doctor, mainly treating women.

When the University of Queensland was opened in 1911, Greenham was able to present her qualifications to the Registrar and be awarded a M.B. B.S ad eundum gradum.

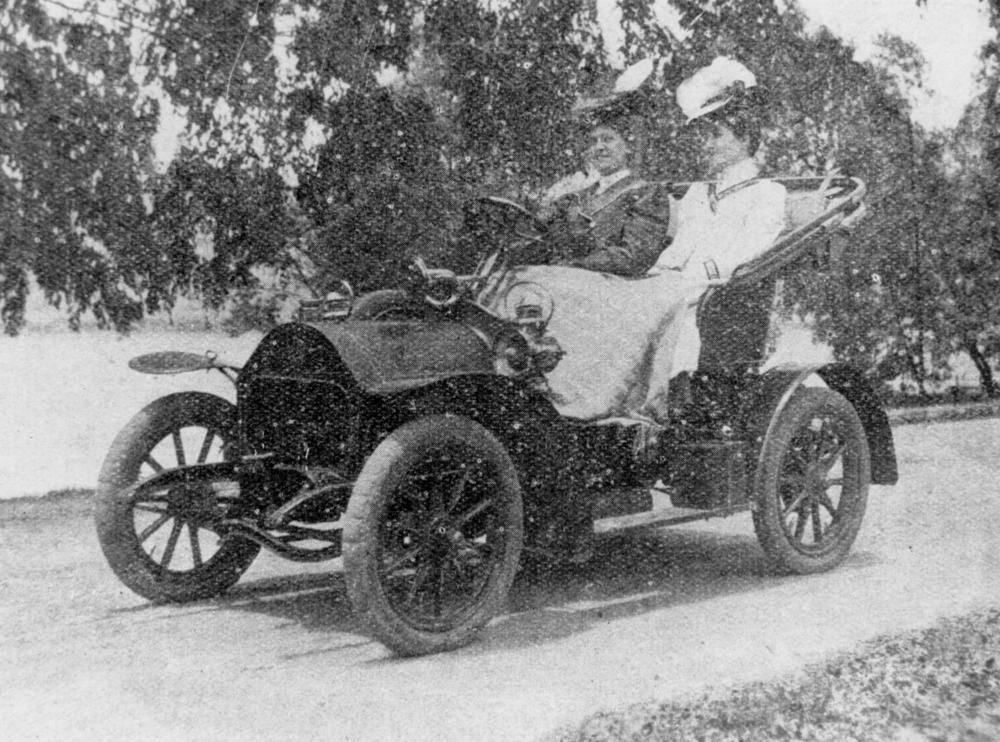
Dr Eleanor Constance Greenham, first Queensland born woman to take a degree in medicine, ca. 1915

Greenham was one of the first women in Queensland to own a car. She became a shareholder in the Hupmobile agency, Evers Motor Co. She was also a chairman of Greenhams Pty Ltd.

In 1945, the Queensland Medical Women's Society recognised her contributions to the medical profession of Queensland, with honorary membership. She was similarly recognised by the Queensland branch of the British Medical Association in 1953, of which she was a member for over 50 years.

== Later life ==
Greenham retired from practice in 1950. She did not marry, but was a generous aunt to many of her nieces and nephews. She died on 31 December 1957 at New Farm.
