= Townsville Grammar School =

Location
- Townsville, Queensland; Australia; 19°15′3″S 146°48′18″E

Information
- Type: Independent, day & boarding, IB
- Motto: Latin: Bonus Intra Melior Exi (Come In Good, Go Out Better)
- Denomination: Non-denominational
- Established: 1888
- Headmaster: Connor Barrett
- Grades: P–12
- Gender: Co-educational
- Enrolment: ~1,400
- Colours: Black and gold
- Website: www.tgs.qld.edu.au

Townsville Grammar School is an independent, co-educational, day, International Baccalaureate and boarding school, located in Townsville.

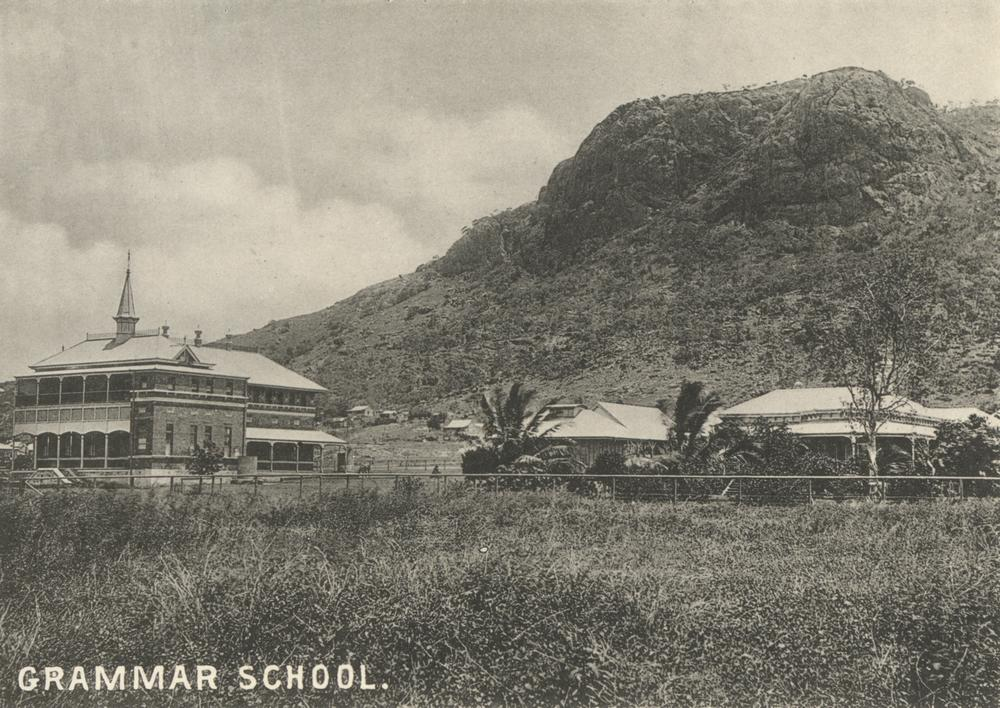
Townsville Grammar School 1900

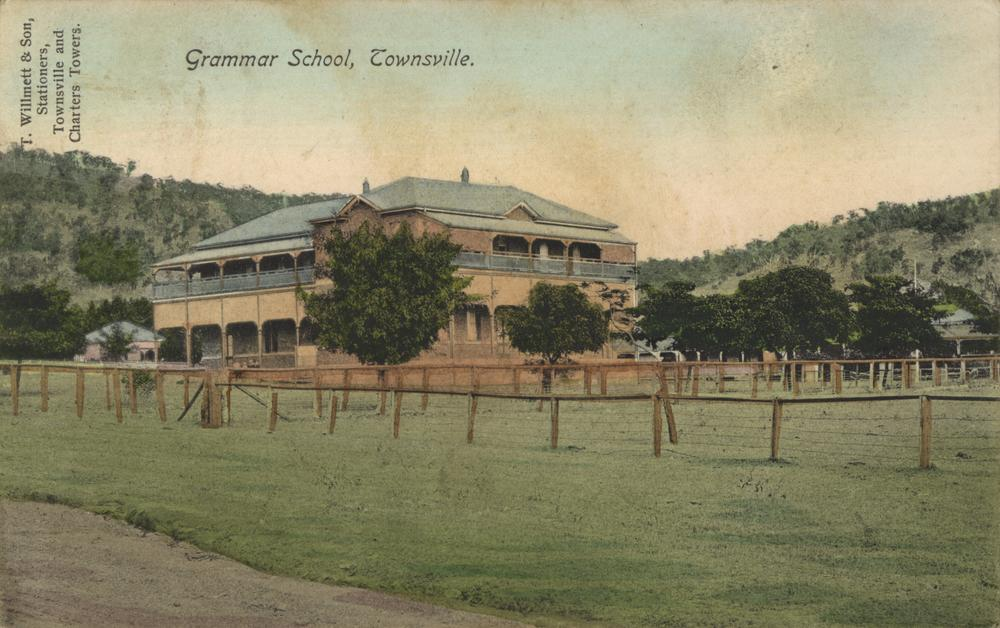
Townsville Grammar School 1905

Established in 1888, it is the northernmost member of the Queensland grammar schools. From its foundation the school encouraged a co-educational environment, but in its early decades the number of female students was particularly small; in its foundation year (1888), "20 boys" are recorded as being enrolled. During World War II the school was acquired by the Royal Australian Air Force for use as barracks accommodation for the No. 3 Fighter Sector RAAF.

== School badge ==
The School Badge was designed in 1902 by a Sydney architect. The background represents the Southern Cross, with the Three Turrets set on the Rock of Christianity, surrounded by the sea of Plenty. The central turret symbolises spiritual values, while the two side turrets represent intellectual and sporting values.

The Latin text on the badge reads "Bonus intra melior exi", translated to English as "Come in good, go out better".

== Headmasters ==
Period	Details	Notes
1888	E. F. Upward	
1889–1900	C. H. Hodges	
1901–1904	Fredrick Thomas Miller	
1905–1938	Percy Fritz "Boss" Rowland	
1939–1946	Thomas Burnside Whight	
1947–1948	A. Campbell Logan	
1946–1965	Maurice William Blank	
1966–1975	Leonard Stanley Daniels	
1976–1992	Alan Douglas Morwood	
1993–1997	S. C. Paul	
1998–2017	Richard W. Fairley	
2018–2025	Timothy J. Kelly	
2026–	Connor Barrett	

P. F. Rowland is as of 2026 the longest serving headmaster, holding his position for 34 years. During his time, "Boss" Rowland taught the School's two Rhodes Scholars, Chester James Parker and George Frederick Emanuel Hall.

== Campuses ==
=== North Shore ===
The Junior School North Shore campus teaches from pre-kindy (for children turning 3 before 30 June). This campus opened in 2015, and continues to grow.

=== Annandale ===
The Junior School Annandale campus teaches from pre-preparatory (for children turning 4 before 30 June) to grade 6. This campus opened in 1997.

=== North Ward ===
The North Ward campus is situated in the seaside suburb of North Ward at 45 Paxton Street, Townsville, QLD 4810. It comprises the Middle School (grades 7–9) and Senior School (grades 10–12). The School House building is now heritage-listed.

== Sporting houses ==
The four sporting houses are named after former headmasters:

- Rowland – Red colour (Percy Fritz Rowland)
- Miller – Light blue colour (Fredrick Thomas Miller)
- Hodges – Green colour (C. H. Hodges)
- Whight – Purple colour (Thomas Burnside Whight)

== Notable alumni ==
- Karen Andrews, politician, current member of parliament for McPherson
- Charles Davidson, politician and former Postmaster-General & Minister for the Navy
- Harriet Dyer, actress
- Jarrod Harbrow, AFL footballer
- Ted Harding, politician and rugby league player
- Remy Hii, actor
- Harold Lowes, lawyer and politician
- Micheal Luck, professional rugby league player
- Agnes McWhinney, first female solicitor in Australia
- Greg Norman, former Number 1 ranked golfer
- Frederick Perkins, teacher, headmaster and minister
- Douglas Reye, pathologist, first to study and namesake of Reye syndrome
- Tia-Clair Toomey, world Crossfit champion and Australian weightlifting Olympist
- Josh Hannay, rugby league player

== Notable staff ==
- Merilyn Manley-Harris, professor of carbohydrate chemistry in New Zealand

== See also ==
- List of schools in Queensland
