= Ipswich Girls' Grammar School =

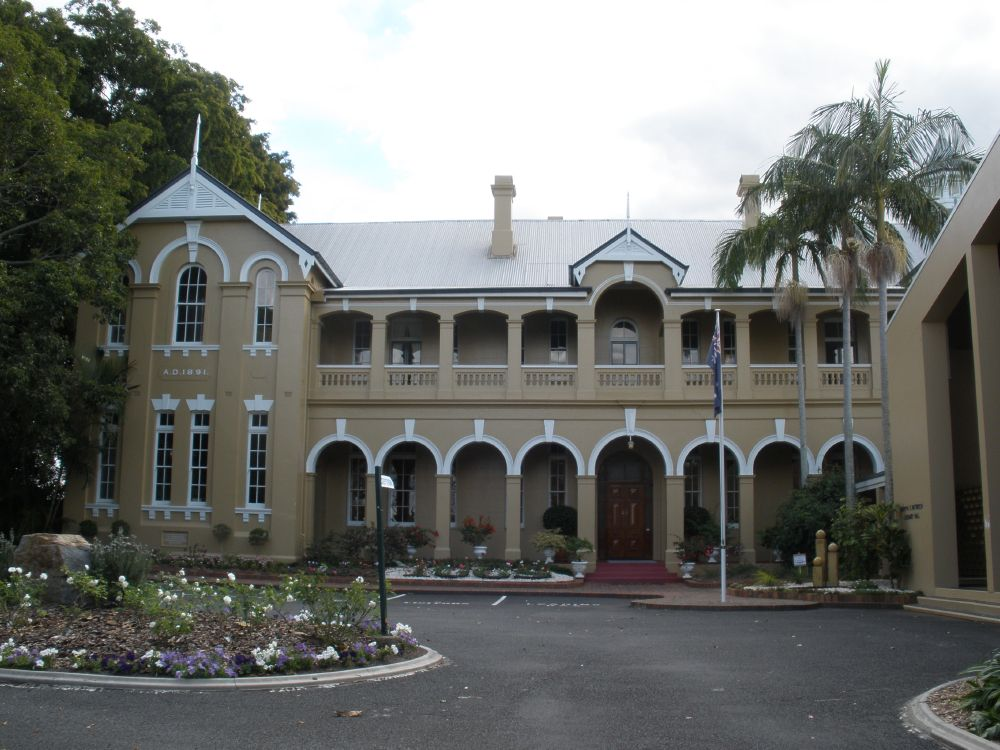

Location
- Ipswich, Queensland; Australia; 27°36′51″S 152°46′11″E

Information
- Type: Independent, day & boarding
- Motto: Latin: Omnia Superat Diligentia (Diligence Overcomes All)
- Denomination: Non-denominational
- Established: 1892
- Chairman: Greg Ploetz
- Principal: Marie Perry
- Employees: ~170
- Grades: P–12
- Gender: Girls
- Enrolment: ~860
- Colours: Navy blue, pale blue & white
- Website: www.iggs.qld.edu.au

Ipswich Girls' Grammar School (IGGS) is an independent, non-denominational, day and boarding school for girls in Ipswich, Queensland, Australia.

The school is one of the eight original Queensland grammar schools established under the Grammar Schools Act 1860. These schools are independent, non-denominational, not-for-profit statutory bodies of the Queensland Government. They are not linked to, administered, or governed by any religious organisation or specific style of education.

Both boys and girls are taught until year 6 at Ipswich Junior Grammar School, situated on the Girls' School campus. Years 7 and above are girls only. The boarding school starts in year 5.

The school is a member of the Queensland Girls' Secondary Schools Sports Association (QGSSSA).

Some Ipswich Girls' Grammar School Buildings are listed on the Queensland Heritage Register.

== Ipswich Junior Grammar School ==
The Head of the Junior School is Nicolee Eiby, who is assisted by Deputy Head, Andrea Ferrando.

== House system ==
The school is split into 5 houses, named after the first five school headmistresses.

- Hunt – named for Fanny E. Hunt BSc. – 1892–1902
- Connell – named for Maud Connell MA – 1902–1905
- White – named for Helen White MA – 1906–1927
- Armitage – named for Lillian M. Armitage MA – 1928–1947
- Carter – named for Katherine C. Carter MBE MA – 1948–1964

In these houses, the students participate in athletics, drama, music, art, debating and more.

== Campus ==
The School's campus is located in central Ipswich. It features a mixture of historic buildings from its inception in 1892 and more modern facilities added over the years. The buildings are spread around the campus, interspersed with many green areas and gardens. Facilities include the performing arts block, state-of-the-art graphics and art studios, gym, swimming pool and specialised language classrooms.

== New buildings ==
Following a devastating fire that destroyed the science block in the Senior School on 27 August 2005, IGGS has embarked on a major building program. Two new buildings were constructed after several years of negotiations undertaken by the school's board of trustees and executive; these buildings cost over $20 million and were completed by the beginning of the 2009 school year.

== Notable people ==
Students:

- Heather Bonner, Indigenous rights activist
- Zora Cross, poet, novelist and journalist
- Dakota Davidson, AFL Women's player
- Bryony Duus, soccer player and coach
- Deb Frecklington, Member of the Queensland Legislative Assembly
- Eleanor Constance (Ella) Greenham, first Queensland-born women to graduate a medical degree
- Bronwyn Harch, research statistician, academic
- Vi Jordan, the second woman to be elected to the Queensland parliament
- Kate Lutkins, AFL Women's player
- Rachel Nolan, the youngest woman elected to the Queensland parliament

Teachers:

- Caroline Barker, artist, taught art at the school 1921–1922
- Mary Dunstan Wilson, Sister of Charity and educator

== See also ==
- List of schools in Queensland
