= Grammar Schools Act 1860 =

Parliamentary act in Australia

Parliament of Queensland
- Long title: An Act to provide for the Establishment of Grammar Schools in Queensland.
- Citation: 24 Vict. No. 7
- Royal assent: 7 September 1860
- Status: Repealed

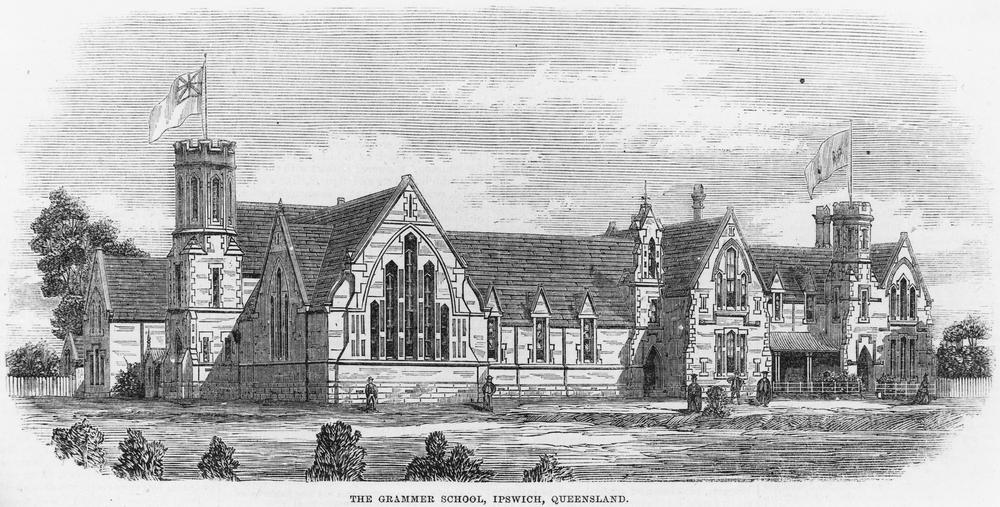
Sketch of Ipswich Grammar School, 1873

The Grammar Schools Act 1860 was passed by Queensland's first parliament in 1860 and allowed for the establishment of a grammar school in any town where £1000 could be raised locally. Between the years 1863 and 1892, ten grammar schools were opened under the auspices of the act. The first of these was Ipswich Grammar School, which opened in 1863.

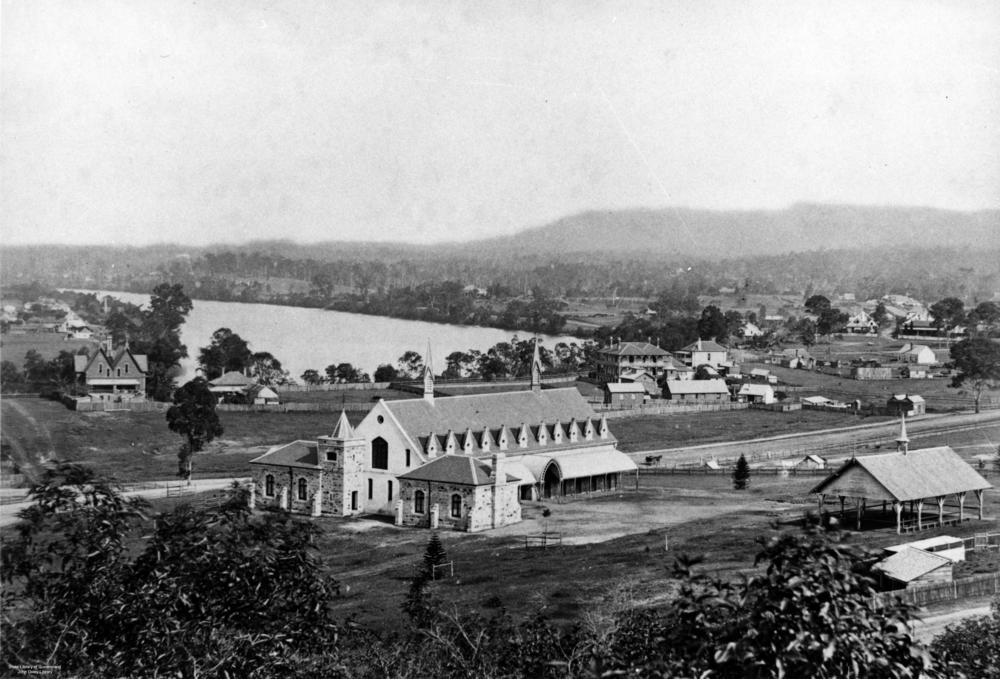
Brisbane Grammar School, 1874 (the school would later move to Gregory Terrace)

== History of the act ==
The Grammar Schools Act 1860 was the fourth bill of the first parliament of Queensland. Along with the Primary Schools Act 1860 (Qld), it aimed to bring Queensland under one general and comprehensive education system without prejudice.

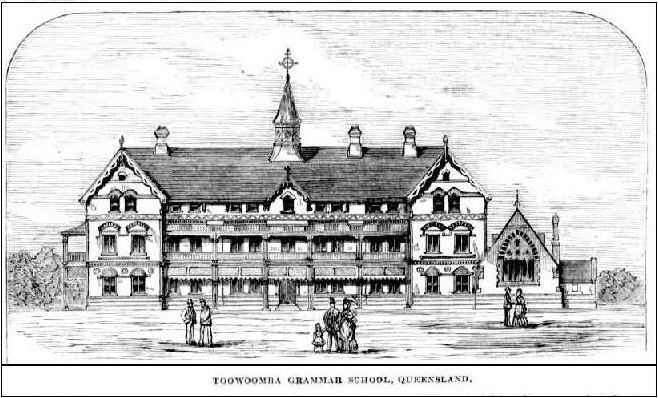
Toowoomba Grammar School, sketch prior to construction, 1875

In the early years of Australian education, denominational schools (particularly Anglican schools) had a large influence. By the time of the first parliament of Queensland in 1860, there was a general feeling that any system of education established in Queensland should be free of denominationalism.

The act received little opposition in either house of parliament – revealing its popularity. It found the approval of the public in general, and even among sections of the Anglican community. The act marked a departure from the education systems in place in Victoria and New South Wales, where schools were generally tied up with respective religious bodies or (in the case of schools such as Sydney Grammar School) being provided massive, ineffective endowments, with little effort required from the community.

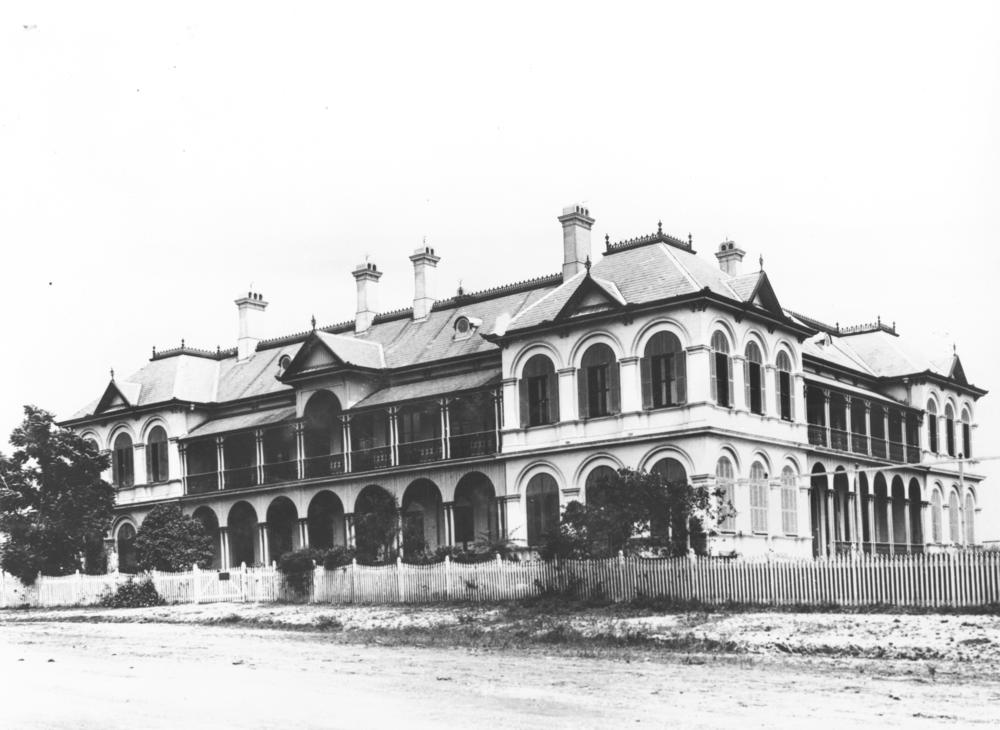
Brisbane Girls Grammar School, circa 1905

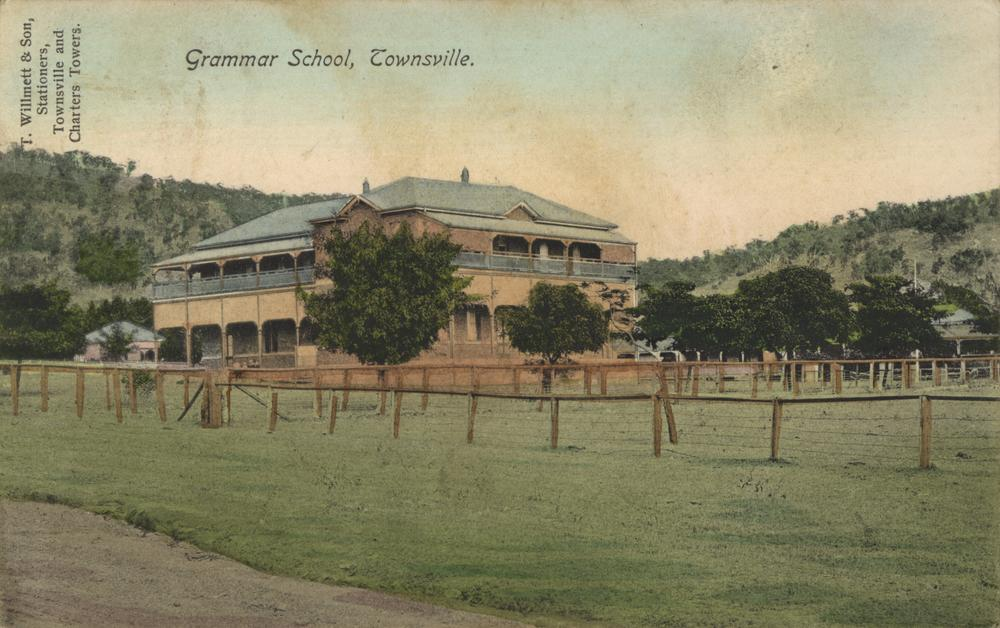
Townsville Grammar School, circa 1905

The main points of the act are summarised below. Basically, the act allowed for the establishment of a grammar school in any town where £1000 could be raised locally. The Queensland Government then matched that figure. The schools were to be administered by a seven-member board of trustees, of which four members were appointed by the Governor. The act also made provision for public scholarships for students to attend university in Britain or the southern states of Australia.

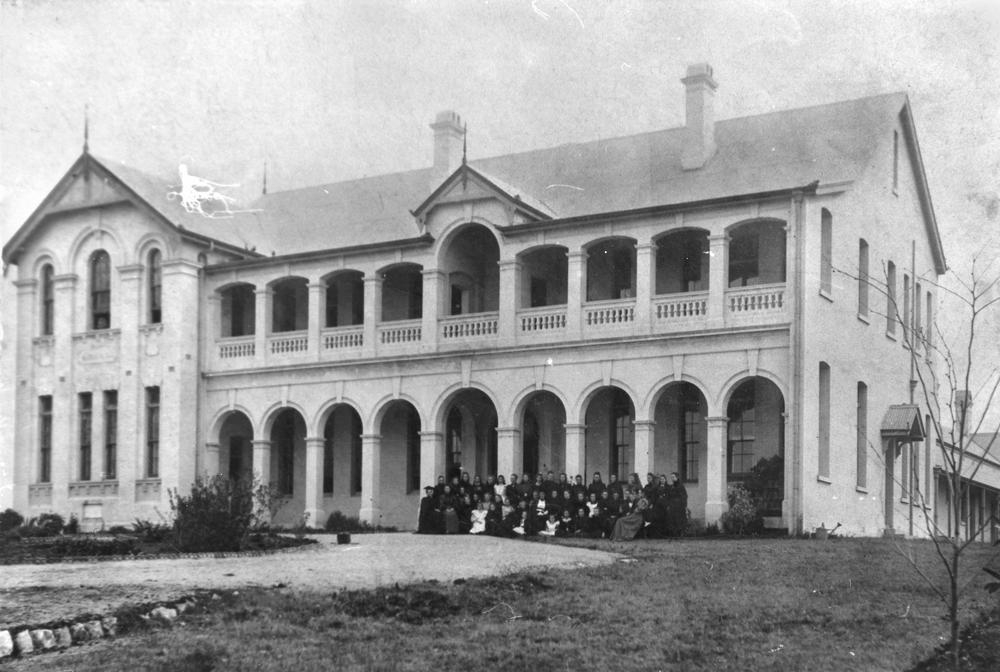
Ipswich Girls' Grammar School, 1894

The act was repealed in 1975 and replaced with the Grammar Schools Act 1975.

== Schools opened under the act ==
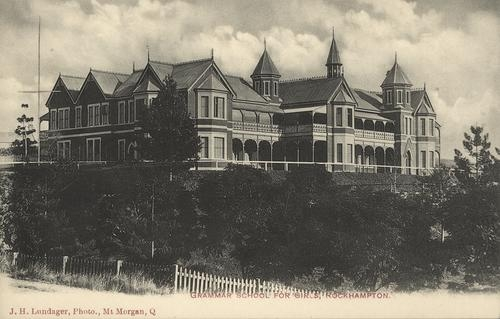
Rockhampton Girls Grammar School, circa 1895

There were ten grammar schools opened under the act – eight of which remain open today. In chronological order, they were:

1. Ipswich Grammar School for boys (1863)
2. Brisbane Grammar School for boys (1868)
3. Toowoomba Grammar School for boys (1875)
4. Brisbane Girls Grammar School (1875)
5. Rockhampton Grammar School initially for boys and girls, later only for boys (1881)
6. Maryborough Grammar School for boys (1881)
7. Maryborough Girls Grammar School (1883)
8. Townsville Grammar School for boys and girls (1888)
9. Ipswich Girls Grammar School (1892)
10. Rockhampton Girls Grammar School (1892)

When it opened in 1881, Rockhampton Grammar School was co-educational. Only four years later, the board of trustees decided to exclude females from the school, leading to the construction of Rockhampton Girls Grammar School. The latter opened on 11 March 1892 – one day after the official opening of Ipswich Girls Grammar School. (Females were readmitted to Rockhampton Grammar School in 1977 after a 92-year absence).

In 1936, hit hard by the effects of the Great Depression, the Maryborough Grammar School and Maryborough Girls Grammar School were forced to close. They were subsequently taken over by the Department of Education, Queensland Government, and renamed the Maryborough State High and Intermediate School for Boys and Maryborough State High and Intermediate School for Girls. In 1974, these schools merged to become the Maryborough State High School.

== Main points of the act ==
The main aspects of the act were as follows:

- That where £1000 was raised by donation or subscription in any district for the purpose of establishing a grammar school, then the governor (with the advice of the executive council), if satisfied with the proposed school, paid to the trustees "a sum not exceeding the amount raised".
- That when fees to the amount of £250 per annum were promised for a period of not less than three years, the governor (with the advice of the executive council) shall pay out of the general revenue of the colony £500 to the credit of the trustees, towards the upkeep of the school.
- A body of seven persons, to be called the trustees of the school, were to be elected. Four of those seven were to be nominated by the governor (with the advice of the executive council), whilst the other three were to be elected by vote of subscribers of over £5 to the funds of the school.
- The governor (with the advice of the executive council) was permitted to, in any one year, reserve 10% of the amount payable to a school to provide for scholarships to any British or Australian university. Such scholarships were awarded after public competitive examinations.
