= Gympie Court House =

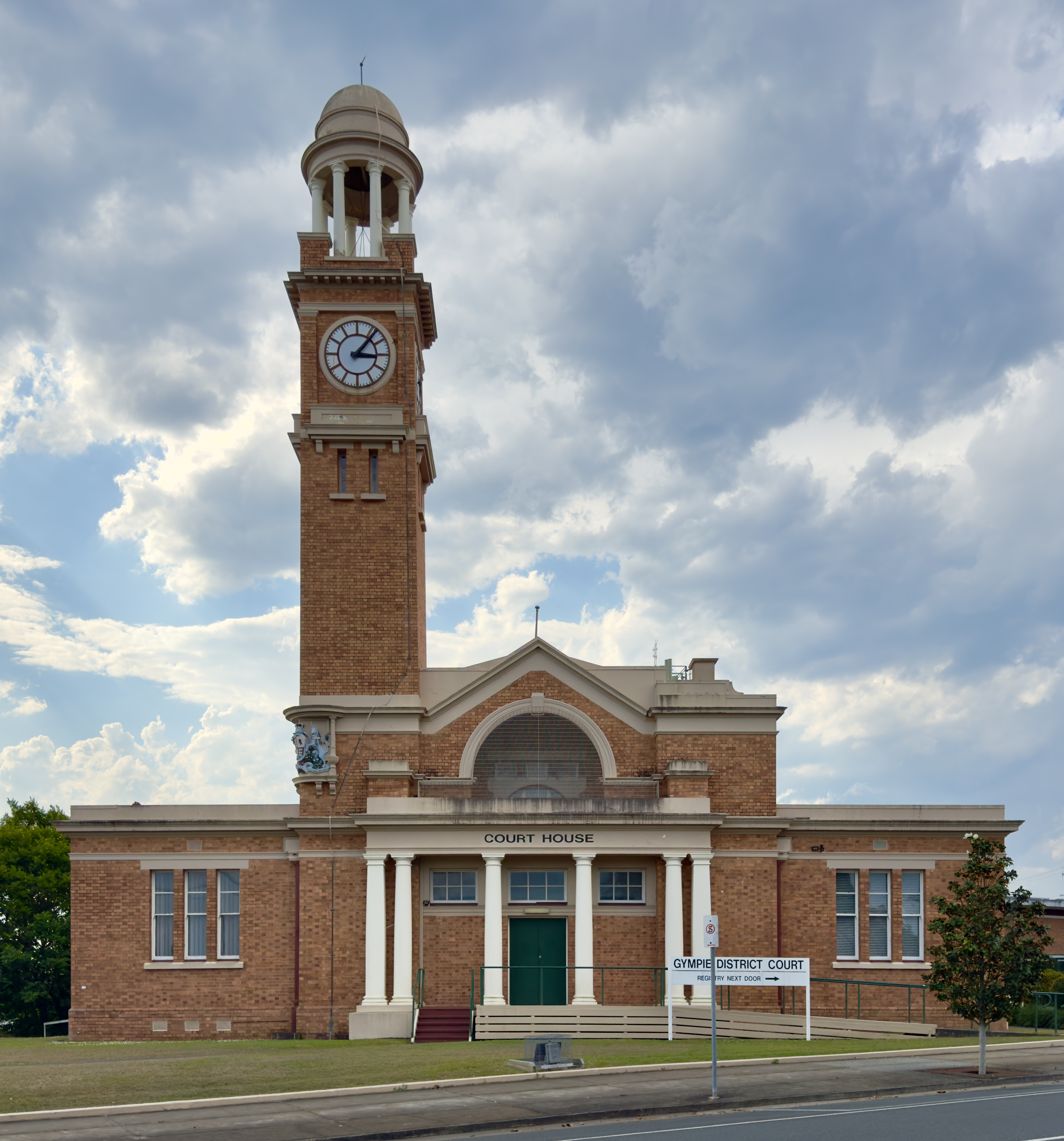
- Gympie Court House, 2025

- Location within Queensland Location within Australia
- 26.187°S 152.6593°E
- Location: Channon Street, Gympie, Queensland, Australia

History
- Design period: 1900–1914 (early 20th century)
- Built: 1900–1902

Site notes
- Architect: John Smith Murdoch
- Architectural style: Classicism

Queensland Heritage Register
- Official name: Gympie Court House
- Type: state heritage (built)
- Designated: 21 October 1992
- Reference no.: 600533
- Significant period: 1900s (historical); 1900s (fabric)
- Significant components: tower – clock, court house, roof/ridge ventilator/s / fleche/s
- Builders: Edward Boyle

Gympie Court House is a heritage-listed courthouse at Channon Street, Gympie, Queensland, Australia. It was designed by John Smith Murdoch and built from 1900 to 1902. It was added to the Queensland Heritage Register on 21 October 1992.

== History ==
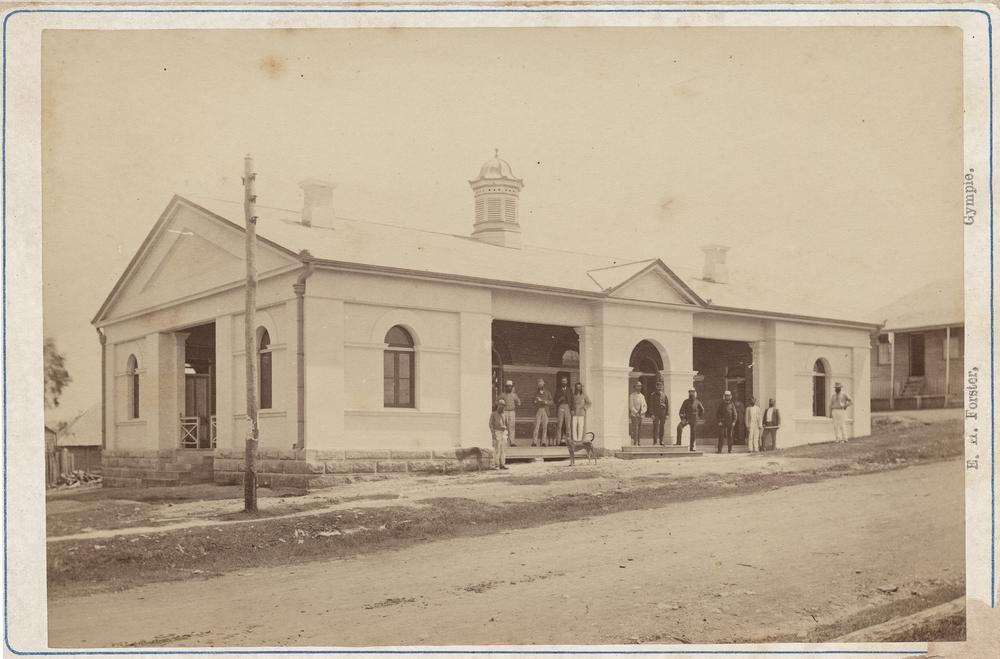
Men standing outside one of Gympie's earlier court houses, 1870

The Gympie Court House is the third court house constructed in Gympie and is located in a prominent location on a ridge at the corner of Channon and King Streets. It was constructed between 1900 and 1902 and is a brick structure with a clock tower on the southern side of the front entrance.

The town of Gympie was established after the discovery of gold in the area by James Nash in 1867. At this stage, the new colony of Queensland was in dire financial trouble, and a reward was offered to anyone who discovered gold. Nash received the reward of £3000, and the rush to the Gympie gold field began. By 1869, the town now known as Gympie had a population of many thousands. It was established so rapidly that by the time the official surveyors arrived in 1868, a substantial amount of the town had already been laid out. This resulted in the town being laid out in an irregular pattern, following the topography of the land and the mining sites, rather than the orthogonal grid pattern familiar to most Queensland towns. The 1868 survey of the town included reserves for public buildings, including the court house reserve.

The first court proceedings in Gympie were held by the Gold Commissioner in a series of temporary structures shortly after the influx of miners to the area. In the late 1860s, a more permanent structure, in the form of a timber slab building was erected on what was known as Commissioner's Hill.

In 1876 a substantial masonry court house building was erected in Channon Street on land reserved for police purposes. This building served the town until the mid-1890s when there was pressure for a new court house, primarily from local Labour politician Andrew Fisher, later the first Queenslander to become Prime Minister of Australia. The 1876 court house building survived and became the Gympie Lands Office.

Although the Queensland Colonial Architect was asked to prepare plans for a new court house in 1898, none were prepared until 1900. The delay may have been due to disputes over the site for the new court house, the site on the corner of King and Channon Street eventually being secured in preference to the original court house reserve on Duke Street. The site was selected by Colonial Architect, Alfred Barton Brady, and the government purchased the land from the Queensland National Bank and a private owner.

The new court house was designed by John Smith Murdoch who, at the time was an architect in the Department of Public Works. Murdoch had arrived in Australia from Scotland, originally working in Melbourne. He began working for the Queensland Public Works Department in the mid-1880s, leaving temporarily to practice privately before returning in the mid-1890s.

In 1901, he was appointed District Architect for the Central and Northern Division of Queensland, and in this capacity designed many government buildings north of Gympie.

Tenders were called for the building in 1900. The first tenders exceeded the £5000 allocated for its construction, requiring the design to be altered. Rendered cement replaced stonework detailing and fencing and landscaping were omitted altogether. Tenders were once again called and Bundaberg builder Edward Boyle won the contract. Boyle commenced work immediately, supervised by Bundaberg architect, Anton Hettrich, temporarily employed by the Works Department specifically for the purpose. The building was completed in March 1902.

The Gympie Court House was designed to suit the site and was intended to be viewed from all four elevations. The dominant clock tower became a landmark in the town. Murdoch designed the building in keeping with the new style of architecture, using a more refined style of embellishment. As it neared completion in 1901, it was described in the Gympie Times as "not possess[ing] any architectural beauty".

The clock tower became a dominant landmark and a popular place from which to view and take photographs of the town.

Due to deductions which were made as a result of Boyle using inferior mortar, fencing was able to be erected. However this was not the originally designed brick and iron fence, but a simpler timber version with steps and a path leading from the corner of King and Channon Street.

In 1907 the roof was reconstructed to the designs of District Architect, Thomas Pye. This was due to the continual problem of a leaking roof, which was thought to be the result of the design.

However, this did not rectify the problem, which continued until the 1940s when the entire roof was replaced with a simple gabled structure.

Future alterations included the installation of a septic system, the addition of public toilets, minor room alterations, and the replacement of the original fence with a low height concrete one.

Work carried out in the 1960s and 70s included division of the court room space and the installation of air conditioning. Later work included an access ramp for the disabled and replacement of the original cedar doors at the front of the building.

== Description ==
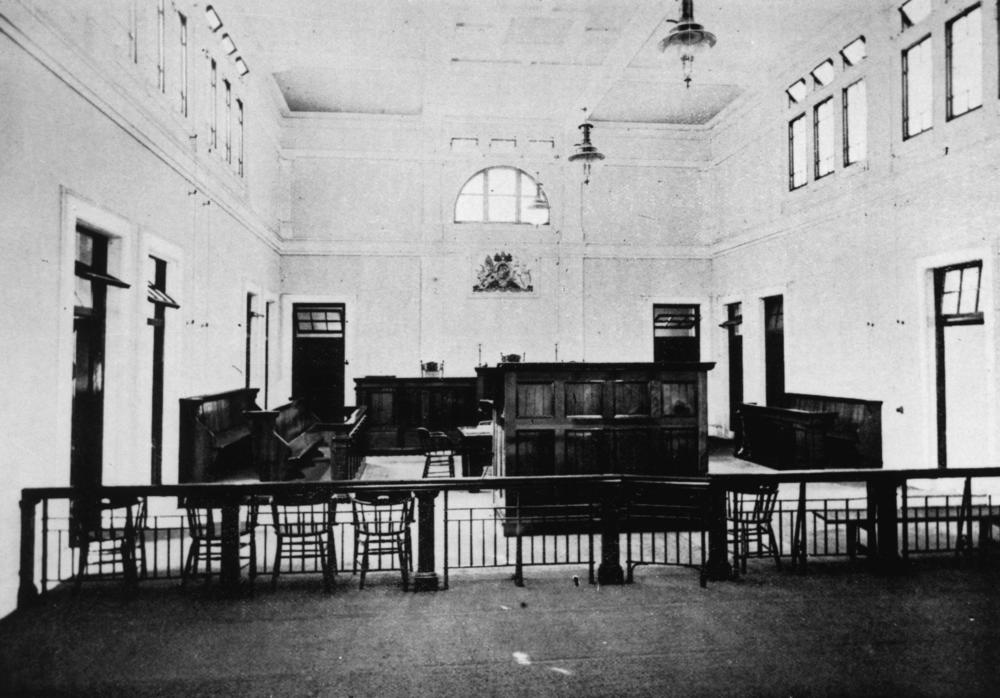
Gympie Courthouse, interior view, 1902

Gympie Courthouse is located at the intersection of Channon and King Street, facing Channon Street, but not aligned to it. A face brick building, in the Federation Free Style, it comprises a single storey structure with a substantial clock tower, located on the southern side of the front entrance.

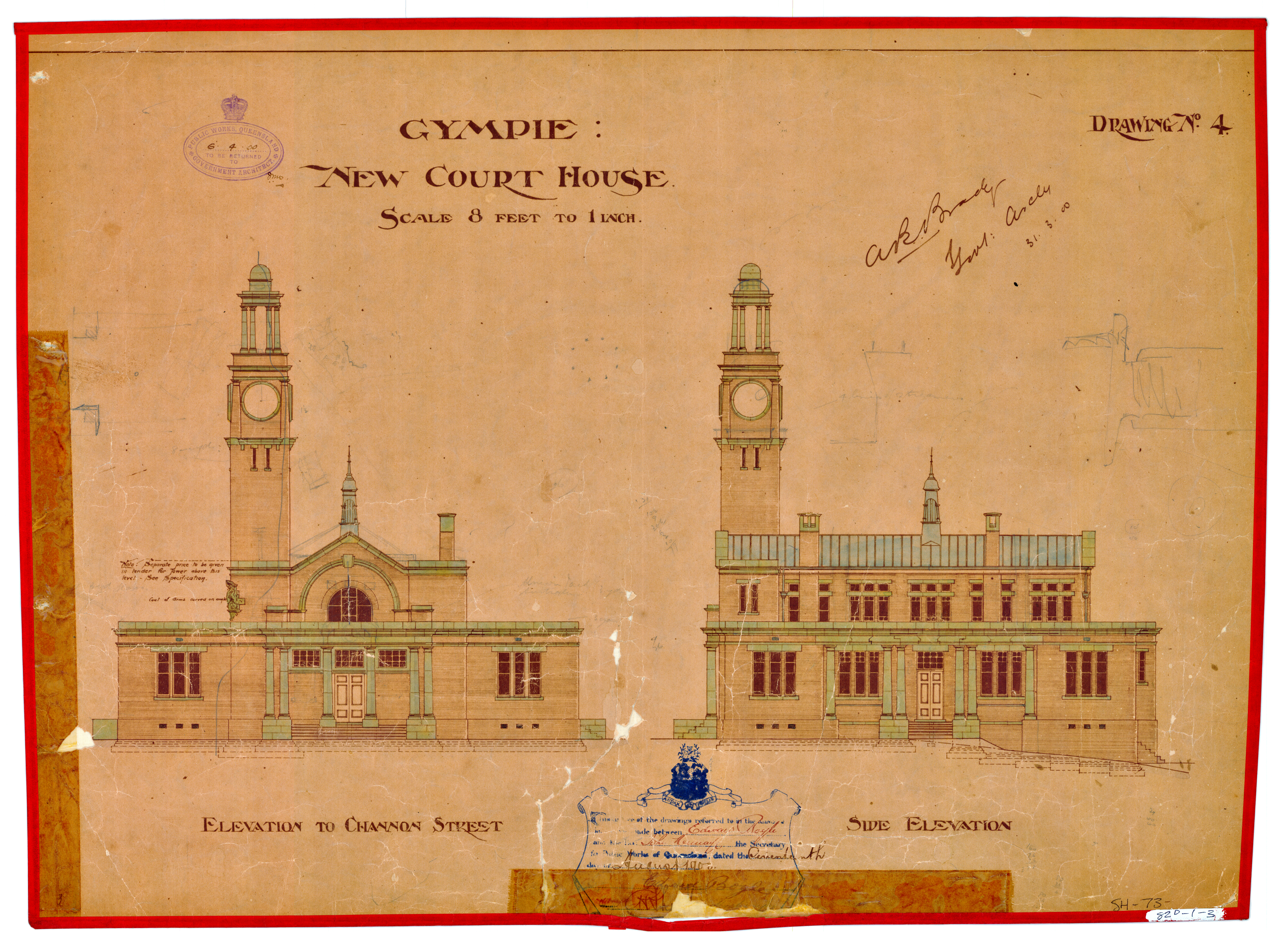
Architectural drawing showing the front and side elevations, 1900

Located on one of the ridges in Gympie, it is a dominant landmark within the town, and together with the Old Gympie Post Office and the Gympie Lands Office, forms a precinct of Queensland Government buildings.

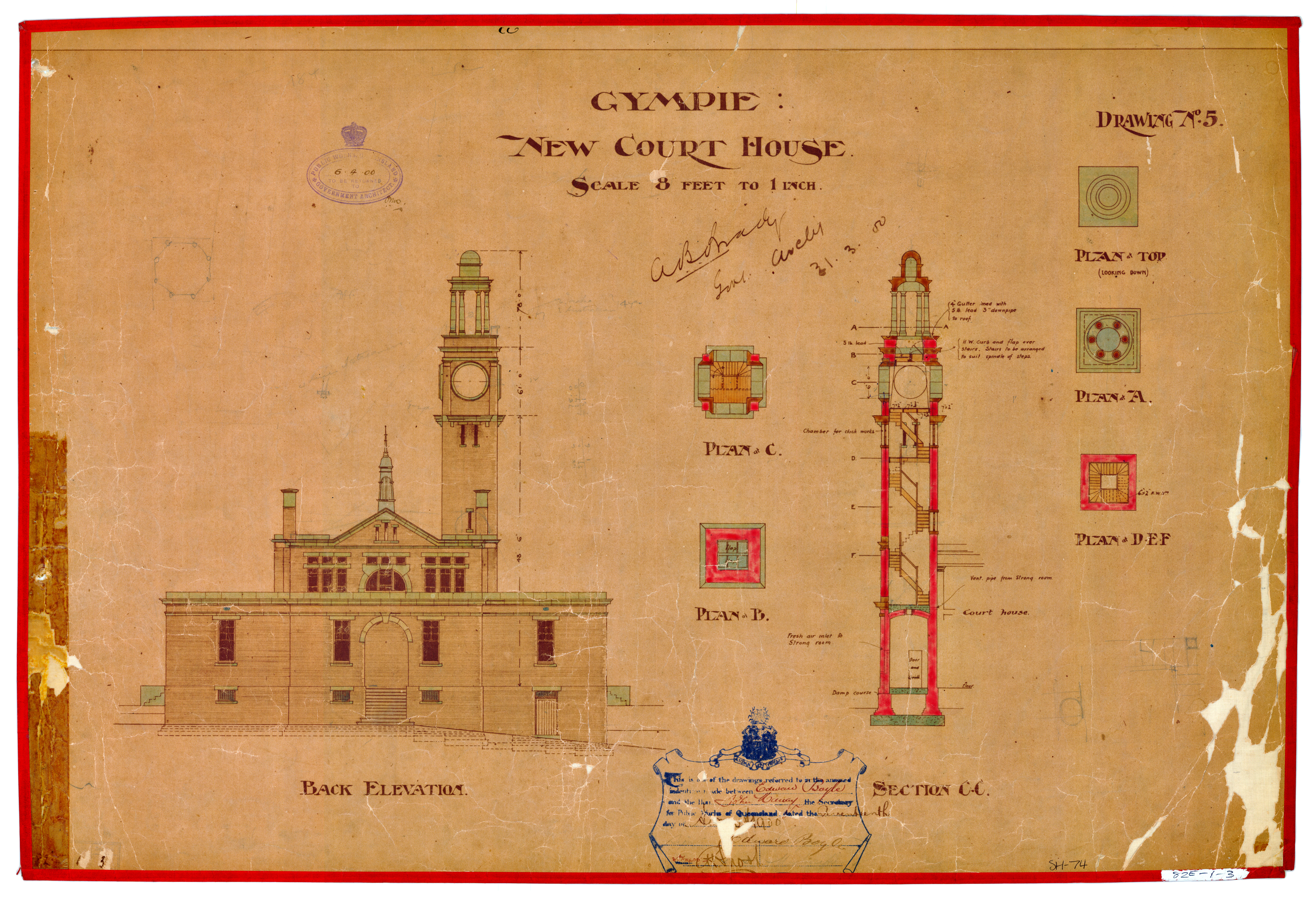
Architectural drawing showing the back elevation and section of the tower, 1900

On the Channon Street elevation a shallow set of stairs leads up to a centrally located portico comprising a substantial entablature supported by four columns and two square-planned piers, all with Doric order capitals and bases. A parapeted gable rises above the central section, which incorporates clerestory windows in each side elevation.

The clock tower is also located within the central section, positioned to the southern side of the central entrance. It is a substantial square-planned brick tower, and comprises the tower, which has a clock face in the upper section of each elevation, surmounted by a belvedere with a cupola above. Various mouldings in cement render are located above and below the clock faces and a coat of arms addresses the intersection of King and Channon Streets.

The side wings are single storeyed, and the entablature is continued around all four elevations. String courses are located below this at the height of the window heads, which run across a grouping of three double hung windows. The entablature, string courses, window heads and sills are cement rendered.

The side elevations are similar to the front elevations, with central entrances of columns and piers with Doric order capitals and bases. However, they sit flush with the line of the building and do not project forward as the main entrance portico does.

At the rear of the building, the ground slopes away to create two- storeys. The central bay projects forward and contains a two-storeyed arched opening, with steps leading to an entrance on the upper floor. The opening is flanked by doors at the lower level, with double hung windows above. Windows are also located on either side of the central bay.

The building is constructed of Campbell's double pressed Redbank face bricks, buff in colour and laid in Flemish bond. Tuck pointing survives in some areas, and all details are finished in cement render.

The central section of the building contains the court room. It is one and a half storeys high, whilst the two side wings are single storeyed. Internally, the court room is centrally located, with rooms for support staff in the side wings. These include rooms for the judge, jury, clerks, registrars and, at the rear, toilets.

The court room is intact, apart from a new wall which creates a new entrance at the front of the building, and the addition of fluorescent lighting and new speakers. The walls are plastered with Keens marble cement to dado height, and capped with a plaster moulding, all now painted. Door and window architraves, a band mould under the sills and pilasters are of painted white plaster. The original furniture and cedar joinery remain intact. The ceiling comprises painted timber panels supported by decorative brackets with large Wunderlich ventilators in the central panels.

The secondary offices also have cedar joinery, including fireplaces. All timberwork remains unpainted, apart from the fireplace in the front room on the northern side of the entrance, which has been painted white. The fireplace in the clerk's office has been removed to make way for a new door opening. Various early objects remain in some rooms, including small shelves with mirrors above and large scale maps of the Gympie region.

== Heritage listing ==
Gympie Court House was listed on the Queensland Heritage Register on 21 October 1992 having satisfied the following criteria.

The place is important in demonstrating the evolution or pattern of Queensland's history.

The Gympie Court House was constructed between 1900 and 1902. It was the second substantial court house to be constructed in Gympie, and as such demonstrates the development of the town and consequently, the evolution of Queensland's history.

The place is important in demonstrating the principal characteristics of a particular class of cultural places.

The Gympie Court House demonstrates the principal characteristics of a building of its type, and the design and plan illustrates the way in which an early twentieth century court house operated.

The place is important because of its aesthetic significance.

The place is a significant landmark in the town of Gympie. Situated on one of the hills of Gympie, the clock tower in particular, forms a dominant and well-known landmark. A precinct of Government buildings is formed by the Court House and nearby Post Office and Lands Office.

The Gympie Court House is of considerable aesthetic significance due to its landmark qualities and for its high quality of design and workmanship. This includes the refined design of the exterior and the purpose built interior fittings and furnishings.

The place has a strong or special association with a particular community or cultural group for social, cultural or spiritual reasons.

The place has strong associations with the local community.

The place has a special association with the life or work of a particular person, group or organisation of importance in Queensland's history.

The place has strong associations with architect J Murdoch as an example of the development of his work.
