= Rocky Ridge =

Rocky Ridge is the name of various places:

== Australia ==
- Rocky Ridge, Queensland, a rocky outcrop and archaeological site nicknamed the Gympie Pyramid

== Canada ==
- Rocky Ridge, Calgary, a neighbourhood in Calgary, Alberta

== United States ==
- Rocky Ridge, a mountain in Contra Costa and Alameda Counties, California
- Rocky Ridge, Maryland, an unincorporated community
- Rocky Ridge, Missouri, an unincorporated community in Sainte Genevieve County
- Rocky Ridge, Ohio, a village
- Rocky Ridge, Utah, a town
