= Gympie =

- City
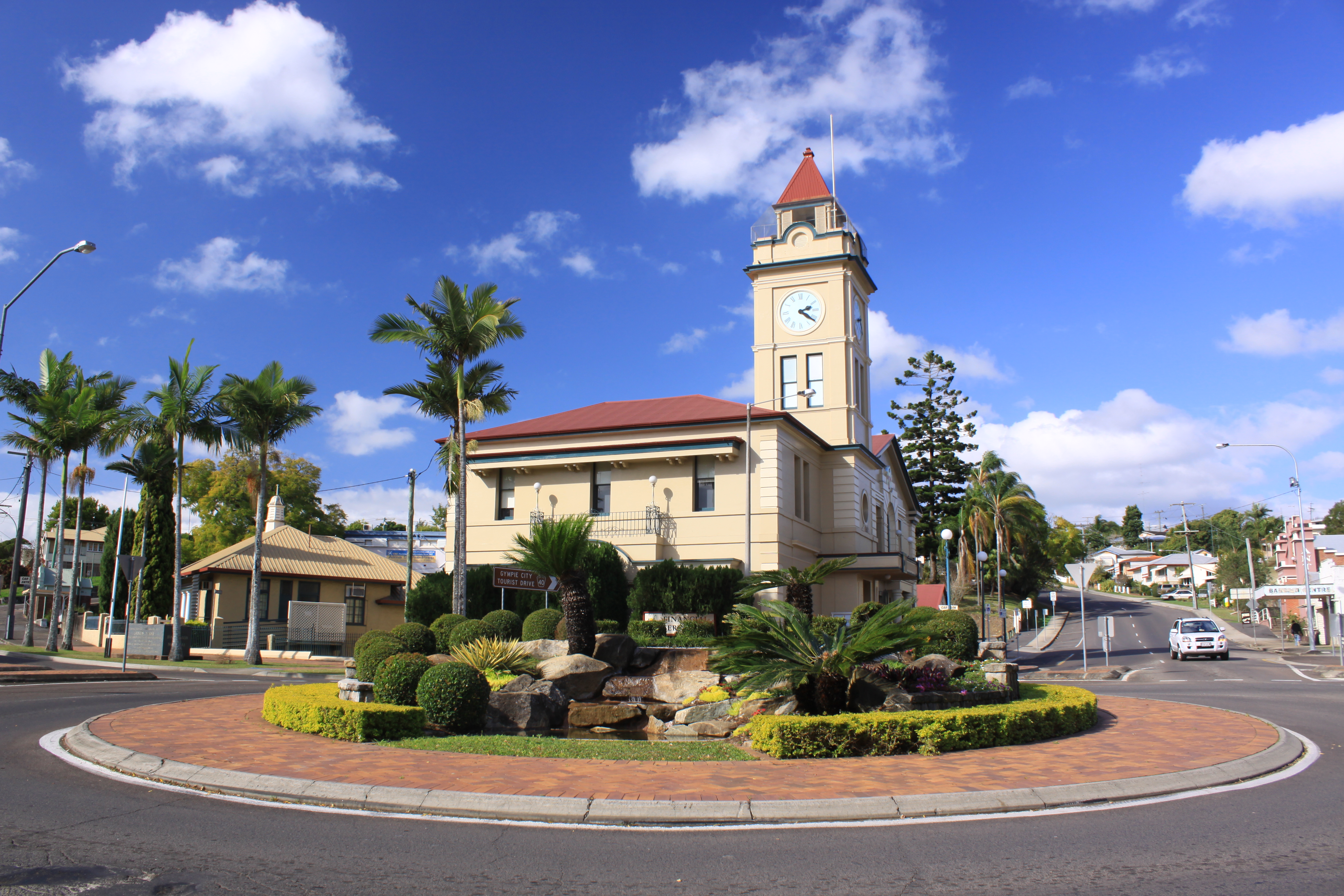
- Gympie Town Hall, 2015

- Interactive map of Gympie
- Coordinates: 26.19°S 152.6655°E
- Country: Australia
- State: Queensland
- LGA: Gympie Region
- Location: 88.4 km (54.9 mi) S of Maryborough; 180 km (110 mi) N of Brisbane
- Established: 1867

Government
  - State electorate: Gympie
  - Federal division: Wide Bay

Area
  - Total: 69.5 km^{2} (26.8 sq mi)
- Elevation: 73 m (240 ft)

Population
  - Total: 22,424 (2021 census) (60th)
  - Density: 322.65/km^{2} (835.7/sq mi)
- Postcode: 4570
- Mean max temp: 27.1 °C (80.8 °F)
- Mean min temp: 13.6 °C (56.5 °F)
- Annual rainfall: 1,132.9 mm (44.60 in)
Localities around Gympie
| Two Mile | Araluen | Victory Heights |
| Widgee Crossing North | Gympie | Victory Heights |
| Southside | Monkland | Monkland |

Gympie (/ˈɡɪmpi/ GHIM-pee) is a city and a locality in the Gympie Region, Queensland, Australia. Located in the Greater Sunshine Coast, Gympie is about 170.7 km (110 mi) north of the state capital, Brisbane. The city lies on the Mary River, which floods Gympie occasionally. The locality of Gympie is the central business district for the city of Gympie and also the administrative centre for the Gympie Region local government area. In the 2021 census, Gympie had an urban population of 22,424 people.

Gympie is famous for its gold field. It contains a number of historic buildings registered on the Queensland Heritage Register.

== History ==
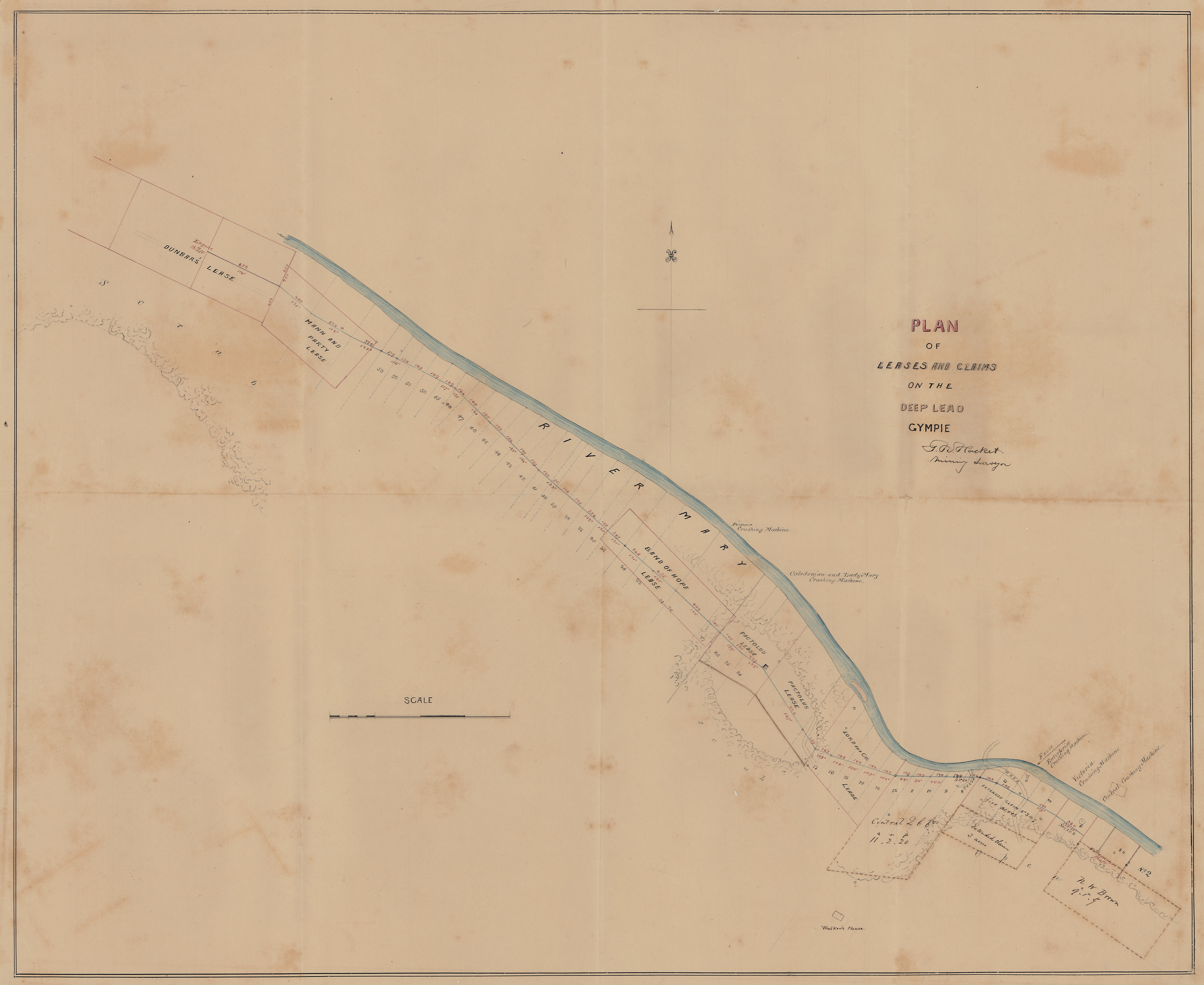
Gold mining leases and claims on the Deep Lead, 1869

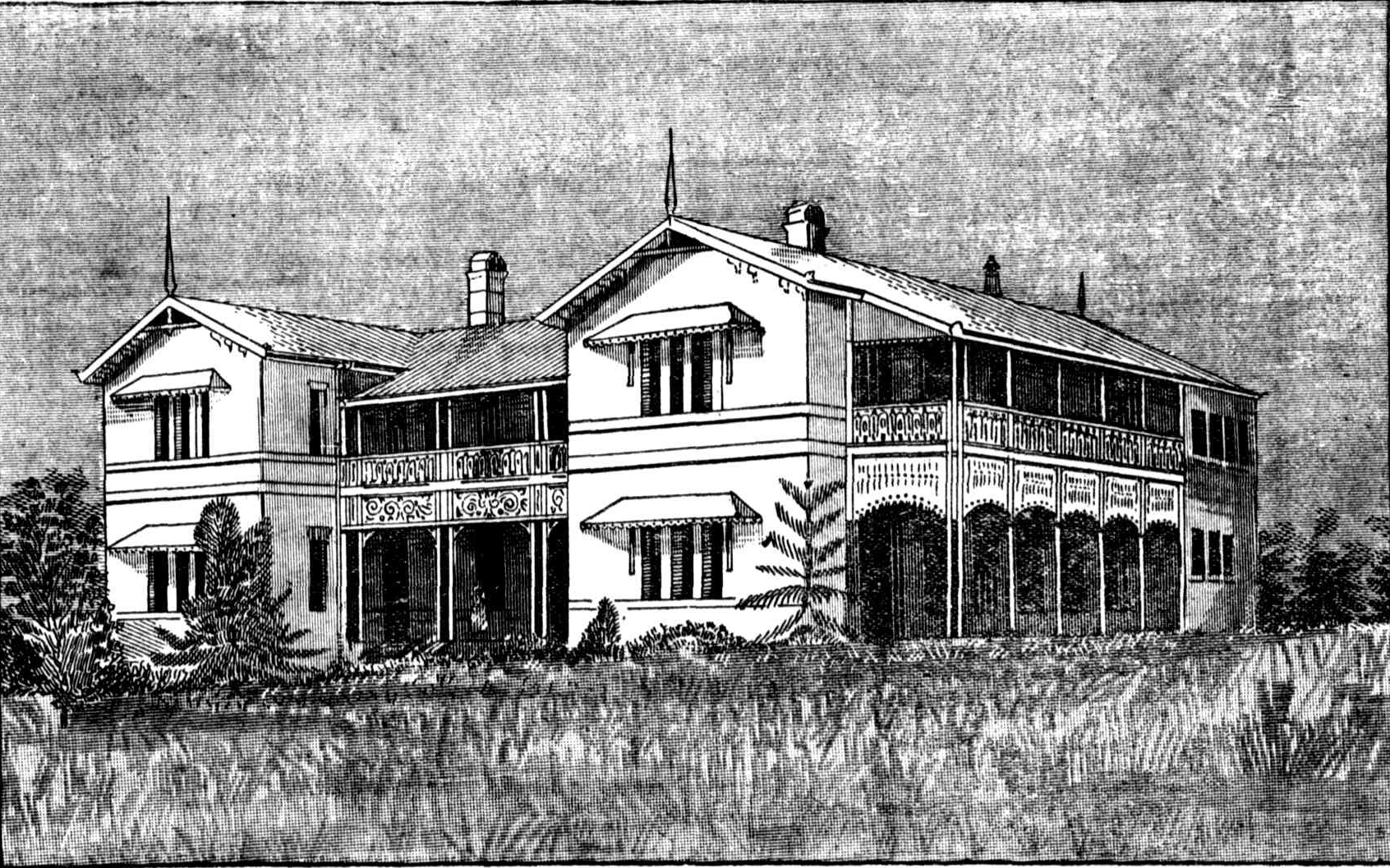
Gympie Hospital, 1891

Gubbi Gubbi (Kabi Kabi, Cabbee, Carbi, Gabi Gabi) is an Australian Aboriginal language formerly spoken by the indigenous peoples of the Sunshine Coast Region and Gympie Region, particularly the towns of Caloundra, Noosa Heads, Gympie and extending north towards Maryborough and south to Caboolture.

Gympie's name derives from the Gubbi Gubbi word gimpi-gimpi, which means "stinging tree" and refers to Dendrocnide moroides. The tree has large, round leaves that have similar properties to stinging nettles. The city was previously named Nashville, after James Nash, who discovered gold in the area in 1867. The name was changed to Gympie in 1868, after a local species of tree was found, the Gimpie-Gimpie. Graziers were the original European settlers. Subsequently, James Nash reported the discovery of "payable" alluvial gold on 16 October 1867. At the time of Nash's discovery, Queensland was suffering from a severe economic depression. Nash saved Queensland from bankruptcy. A memorial fountain in Gympie's Park honours Nash's discovery. The Gympie Gold Rush Festival celebrates the event today. The Gold Rush Festival holds 10 days of cultural events in October. Gold mining still plays a role in the area's fortunes, along with agriculture (dairy predominantly), timber and tourism. The gold rush's rapid development led to streets that are in an irregular fashion.

Nashville Masonic Lodge opened on 24 March 1869 in Duke Street. The first Master was Edward Henry King, the first goldfield commissioner in Gympie. The lodge later relocated and is now known as Pioneer Lodge, while the Duke Street site became the offices of the Shire of Woocoo.

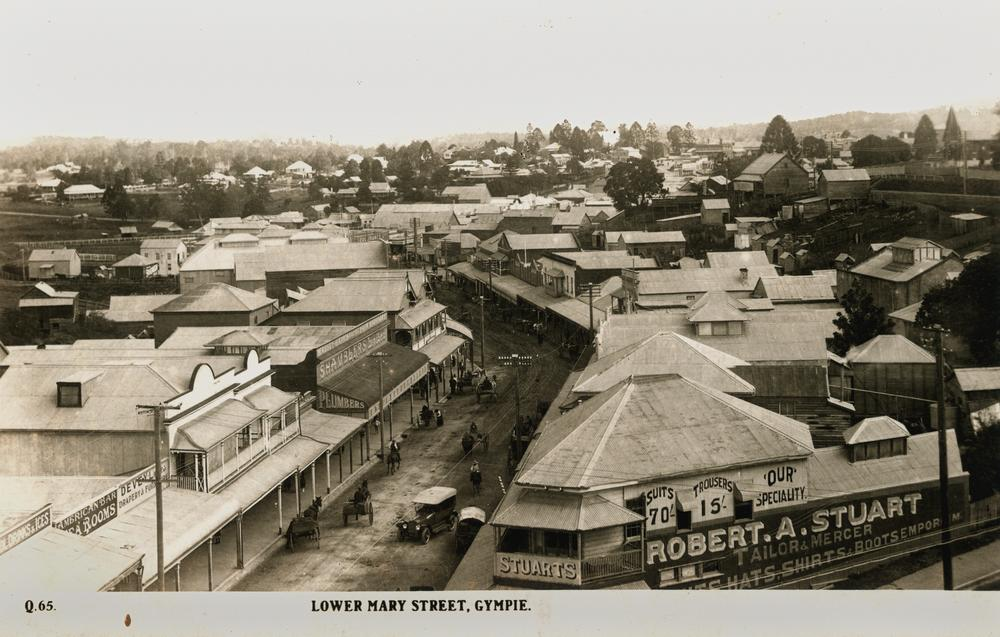
Lower Mary Street, c. 1925

In 1882, a handful of macadamia seeds was taken from trees in Gympie to Hawaii, where they became the basis of Hawaii's macadamia industry. In 2019, researchers collected samples from hundreds of macadamia trees in Queensland, and compared their genetic profiles to samples from Hawaiian orchards. They determined that essentially all the Hawaiian trees must have descended from a small population of Australian trees from Gympie, possibly just a single tree.

Gympie Creek Post Office opened on 1 December 1867. It was renamed Gympie in 1868.

In 1868, a slab hut was built behind the Northumberland Hotel and called the Miner's Bethel. This hut was used to hold religious services by the Anglican Church, the Roman Catholic Church, and Methodist Church until each had established its own church.

A Primitive Methodist Church opened on the diggings at Gympie Creek circa July 1868. It was claimed to be the first church in Gympie. A new Primitive Methodist Church was opened on Commissioner's Hill on Sunday 30 July 1876. Commissioners Hill is described as being from the post office in Duke Street to the corner of Channon and Henry Streets.

A Catholic primary school was established in 1868 by Father. M Horan under lay administration, and was taken over by the Sisters of Mercy in 1880, becoming St Patrick's Catholic Primary School.

In August 1868, Wesleyan Methodists erected a bark hut of pole construction on Surface Hill to use as a basic chapel. It was replaced by a more permanent timber church on the same site facing Reef Street, which opened on Sunday 4 July 1869. The architect was Charles G. Smith and the builder was John Nesbit. In 1890 a brick church was built on the site facing Channon Street and became the Surface Hill Uniting Church (26.189°S 152.6572°E).

A Presbyterian Church opened on One Mile Road at One Mile on Sunday 8 November 1868.

In 1868, a Cobb & Co. service between Brisbane and Gympie commenced, running twice a week. The changing station stables were located adjacent to the Northumberland Hotel in Channon Street.

In 1869, the Church of England constructed a timber church on the corner of Palantine and School Streets; the first rector was Reverend Henry Jephson Campbell. It was known as the Church of St Peter. This church became the parish hall when a second church was built in Lady Mary Terrace in 1887. This was then superseded by the third and current church, built in brick, on the corner of Lady Mary Terrace and Amy Street (26.1887°S 152.6697°E).

One Mile State School was the first school opened in Gympie on 20 September 1869 as One Mile Boys State School with the One Mile Girls and Infants State School opening in October 1874. In January 1943, they were merged into One Mile State School.

Gympie Central Boys State School opened on 18 October 1869 with Gympie Central Girls and Infants State School opening in 1874. In 1899, the Girls and Infants School was separated to become Gympie Central Girls State School and Gympie Central Infants State School. They were amalgamated again in 1912 to become Gympie Central Girls and Infants State School. They were separated again in 1944 re-establishing Gympie Central Infants State School while amalgamating the girls' school with the boys' school to become Gympie Central State School. In 1963, the infants' school amalgamated into Gympie Central State School.

In January 1870, tenders were called for the erection of a Roman Catholic Church.

The railway from Maryborough was completed in 1881. The North Coast railway linked Gympie to Brisbane in 1891.

St Andrew's Anglican Church was first established at Mount Pleasant/One Mile in 1876. It closed around 1968. As at 2019, the church building no longer exists, but the rectory in Graham Street had become a private home. In 2020, this was relocated to Gympie and opened on 29 January 1902.The state declared Gympie a town in 1903.

Little Flower School was opened in 1904 by the Christian Brothers as a secondary school for boys. It was later renamed Sacred Heart Memorial College. It closed in 1982 when it was amalgamated with St Patrick's Catholic Secondary School for Girls to create St Patrick's Catholic College.

Gympie South State School opened on 4 July 1910.

Gympie State High School opened on 29 January 1912. This school is one of the oldest state secondary schools in Queensland.

St Patrick's College in Gympie opened on 30 December 1916.

St Patrick's Catholic Secondary School for Girls opened in 1917. In 1983, it merged with the Sacred Heart Memorial College to become St Patrick's Catholic College.

A powdered milk factory began operations in 1953.

Gympie West State School opened on 28 January 1958.

Gympie East State School opened on 25 January 1965.

Gympie Special School opened in January 1972.

James Nash State High School opened on 24 January 1977.

The Christian Family College opened on 1 February 1983 and closed on 24 January 1988.

=== Flooding ===
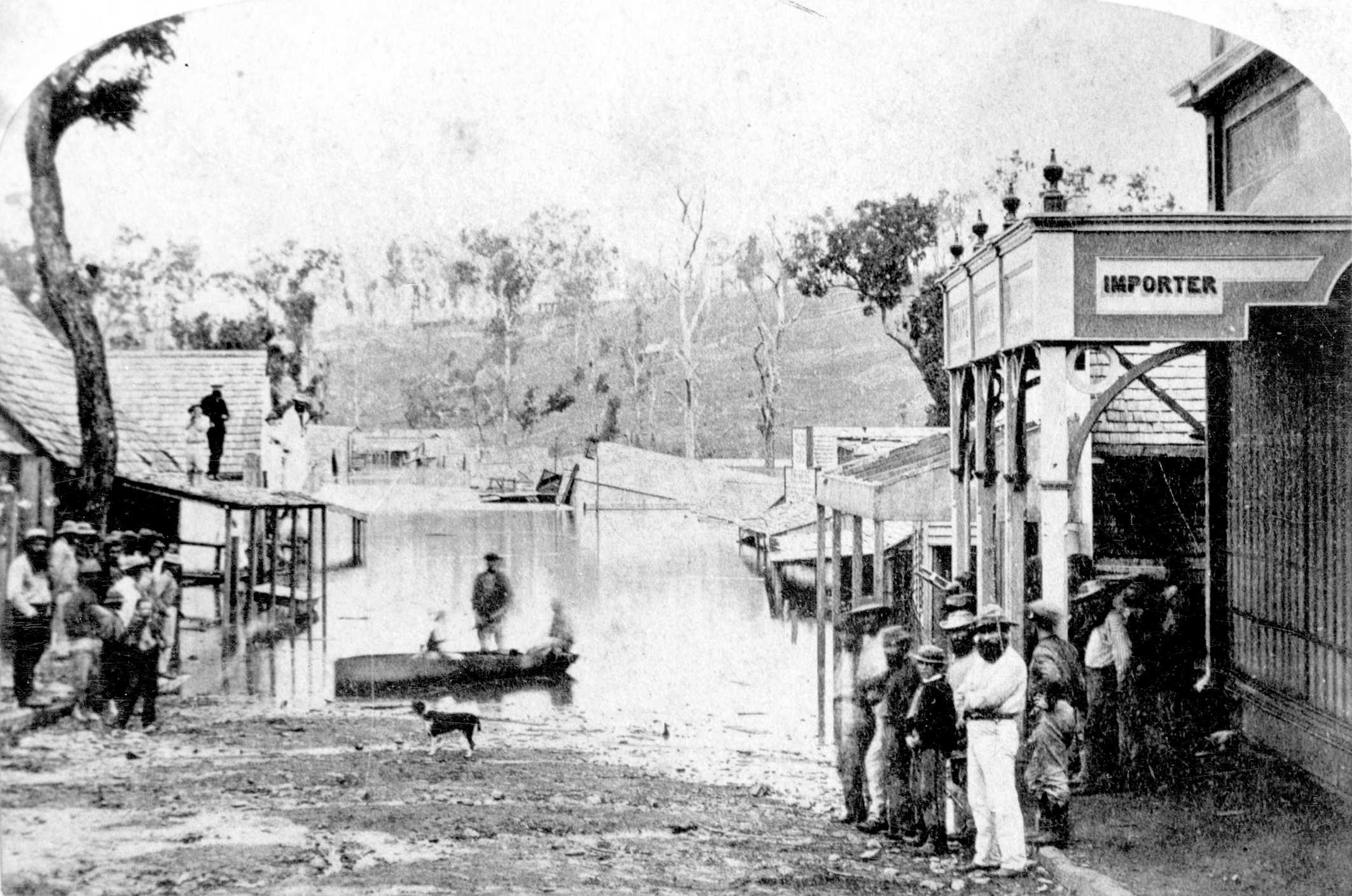
The 1873 Gympie flood

Significant floods along the Mary River have caused inundations of the city in 1870, 1873, 1893, 1955, 1968, 1974, 1989, 1992, 1999, 2011, 2013, and 2022. The first recorded flood in Gympie was in 1870. Most of the floods occur between December and April and are typically caused by heavy rainfall in the headwaters to the south.

The highest flood ever recorded in Gympie occurred on 2 February 1893, when the river peaked at 25.45 m (83.5 ft). Gympie was declared a natural disaster area during the 1999 floods. The river peaked at 21.9 metres (72 ft) then. On the 27 February 2022 the river peaked at 22.96 m, superseding the 1999 flood record by over a metre.

Numerous highways and roads in and around the city, which were destroyed or damaged during floods in 2011, were repaired under Operation Queenslander, the name given to post-flood reconstruction efforts in Queensland.

In March 2012, the Gympie Regional Council decided to spend about $30,000 for a cost-benefit analysis on flood mitigation measures. Major flooding also occurred in 2022.

== Demographics ==
In the 2016 census, Gympie had an urban population of 20,966 people. Aboriginal and Torres Strait Islander people made up 3.9% of the population; 82.4% of people were born in Australia. The next most-common countries of birth were England 2.6%, New Zealand 1.9%, and the Philippines 0.6%. About 89.6% of people spoke only English at home. The most common responses for religion were no religion 30.1%, Catholic 16.8%, and Anglican 15.6%.

In the 2021 census, Gympie had an urban population of 22,424 people.

== Heritage listings ==
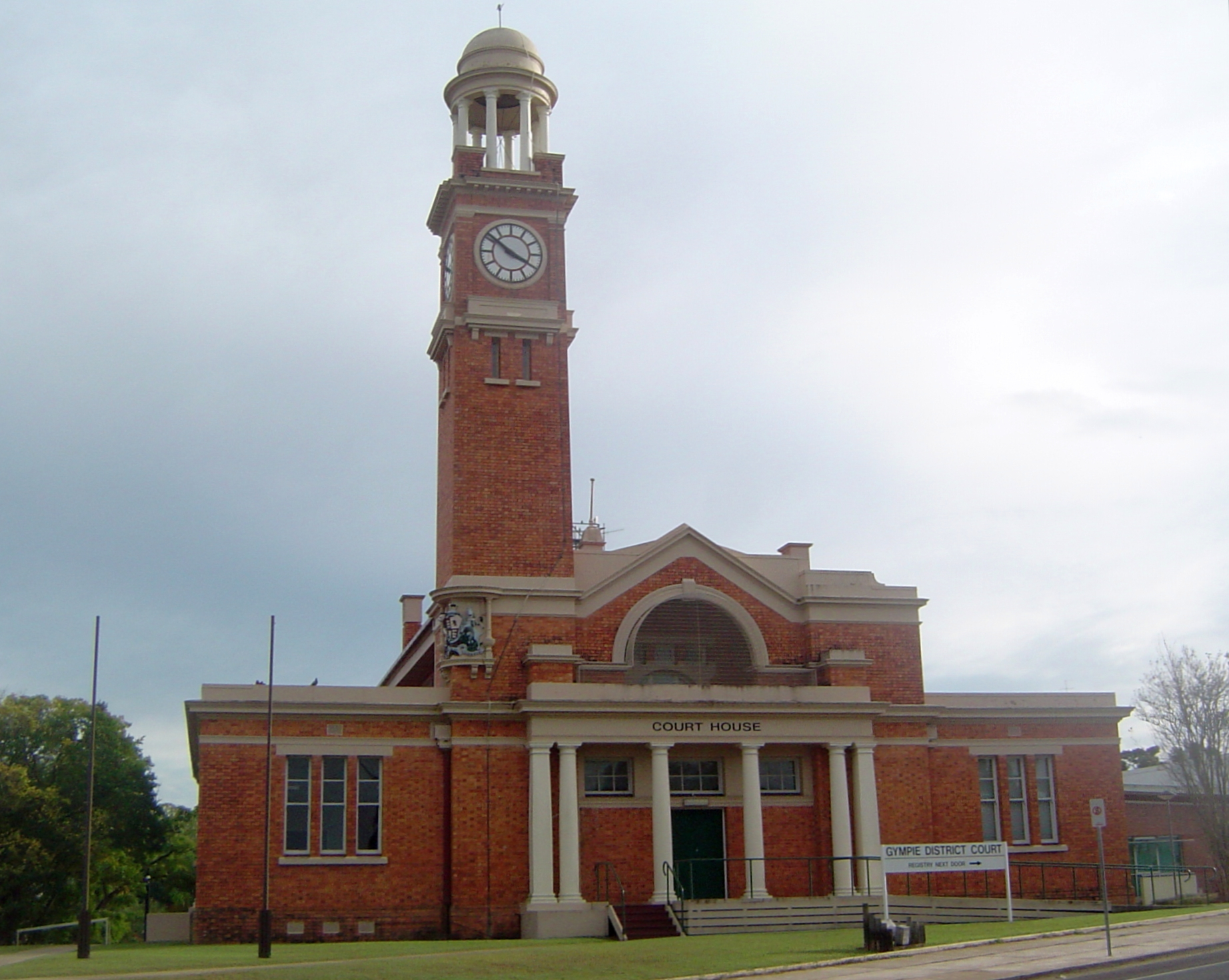
Gympie Court House, 2012

Gympie has a number of heritage-listed sites, including:

- Monkland State School Residence, Brisbane Road
- Gympie Town Hall, 2 Caledonian Hill
- Gympie Court House, Channon Street
- Old Gympie Post Office, Channon Street
- Surface Hill Uniting Church, Channon Street
- Gympie Lands Office, 26 Channon Street
- former Queensland National Bank, corner of Channon Street and Nash Streets
- St Patricks Church, Church Street
- former Gympie Ambulance Station, 17 Crown Road
- Gympie State High School buildings, 1 Everson Road (26.1888°S 152.6794°E)
- Gympie and Widgee War Memorial Gates, Mary Street
- former Royal Bank of Queensland, 199 Mary Street
- former Crawford and Co Building, 216 Mary Street
- Tozer's Building, 218 Mary Street
- Smithfield Chambers, 235 Mary Street
- former Australian Joint Stock Bank and former Gympie Stock Exchange, 236 Mary Street
- former Bank of New South Wales, 242 Mary Street
- Gympie School of Arts, 39 Nash Street
- Gympie Memorial Park, River Road:
- Railway Hotel, 1 Station Road
- Gympie railway station, Tozer Street

== Climate ==
Gympie experiences a humid subtropical climate (Köppen: Cfa) with hot, rainy summers and mild, dry winters with cool nights. Annual rainfall averages around 1,117.4 mm (43.99 in), with a summer maximum. Extreme temperatures have ranged from −4.3 °C (24.3 °F) on 20 July 2007 to 42.4 °C (108.3 °F) on 4 January 2014.

Climate data for Gympie (26º10'48"S, 152º38'24"E, 65 m AMSL) (1908–2024 normals, extremes 1965–2024, rainfall to 1870)
| Month | Jan | Feb | Mar | Apr | May | Jun | Jul | Aug | Sep | Oct | Nov | Dec | Year |
|---|---|---|---|---|---|---|---|---|---|---|---|---|---|
| Record high °C (°F) | 42.4 (108.3) | 41.3 (106.3) | 38.1 (100.6) | 35.6 (96.1) | 32.8 (91.0) | 29.2 (84.6) | 30.2 (86.4) | 34.3 (93.7) | 38.2 (100.8) | 40.1 (104.2) | 42.2 (108.0) | 42.0 (107.6) | 42.4 (108.3) |
| Mean daily maximum °C (°F) | 31.2 (88.2) | 30.4 (86.7) | 29.3 (84.7) | 27.3 (81.1) | 24.5 (76.1) | 22.1 (71.8) | 21.9 (71.4) | 23.4 (74.1) | 26.1 (79.0) | 28.3 (82.9) | 30.2 (86.4) | 31.3 (88.3) | 27.2 (80.9) |
| Mean daily minimum °C (°F) | 19.6 (67.3) | 19.7 (67.5) | 18.2 (64.8) | 14.7 (58.5) | 10.9 (51.6) | 8.0 (46.4) | 6.4 (43.5) | 7.1 (44.8) | 10.3 (50.5) | 13.9 (57.0) | 16.5 (61.7) | 18.6 (65.5) | 13.7 (56.6) |
| Record low °C (°F) | 12.0 (53.6) | 12.3 (54.1) | 9.8 (49.6) | 3.6 (38.5) | −0.9 (30.4) | −3.3 (26.1) | −4.3 (24.3) | −1.8 (28.8) | 1.3 (34.3) | 4.6 (40.3) | 3.5 (38.3) | 10.1 (50.2) | −4.3 (24.3) |
| Average precipitation mm (inches) | 160.1 (6.30) | 168.9 (6.65) | 143.9 (5.67) | 81.6 (3.21) | 71.5 (2.81) | 59.3 (2.33) | 51.5 (2.03) | 39.3 (1.55) | 44.7 (1.76) | 72.3 (2.85) | 87.4 (3.44) | 135.7 (5.34) | 1,117.4 (43.99) |
| Average precipitation days (≥ 1.0 mm) | 8.9 | 9.3 | 10.0 | 7.3 | 6.2 | 4.9 | 4.5 | 3.9 | 4.2 | 5.7 | 6.5 | 7.8 | 79.2 |
| Average afternoon relative humidity (%) | 56 | 60 | 58 | 57 | 56 | 52 | 47 | 42 | 41 | 46 | 50 | 52 | 51 |
| Average dew point °C (°F) | 19.2 (66.6) | 19.5 (67.1) | 18.1 (64.6) | 15.6 (60.1) | 13.1 (55.6) | 10.0 (50.0) | 8.2 (46.8) | 7.5 (45.5) | 9.6 (49.3) | 12.8 (55.0) | 15.8 (60.4) | 17.8 (64.0) | 13.9 (57.1) |
Source: Bureau of Meteorology (1908–2024 normals, extremes 1965–2024, rainfall to 1870)

== Attractions ==
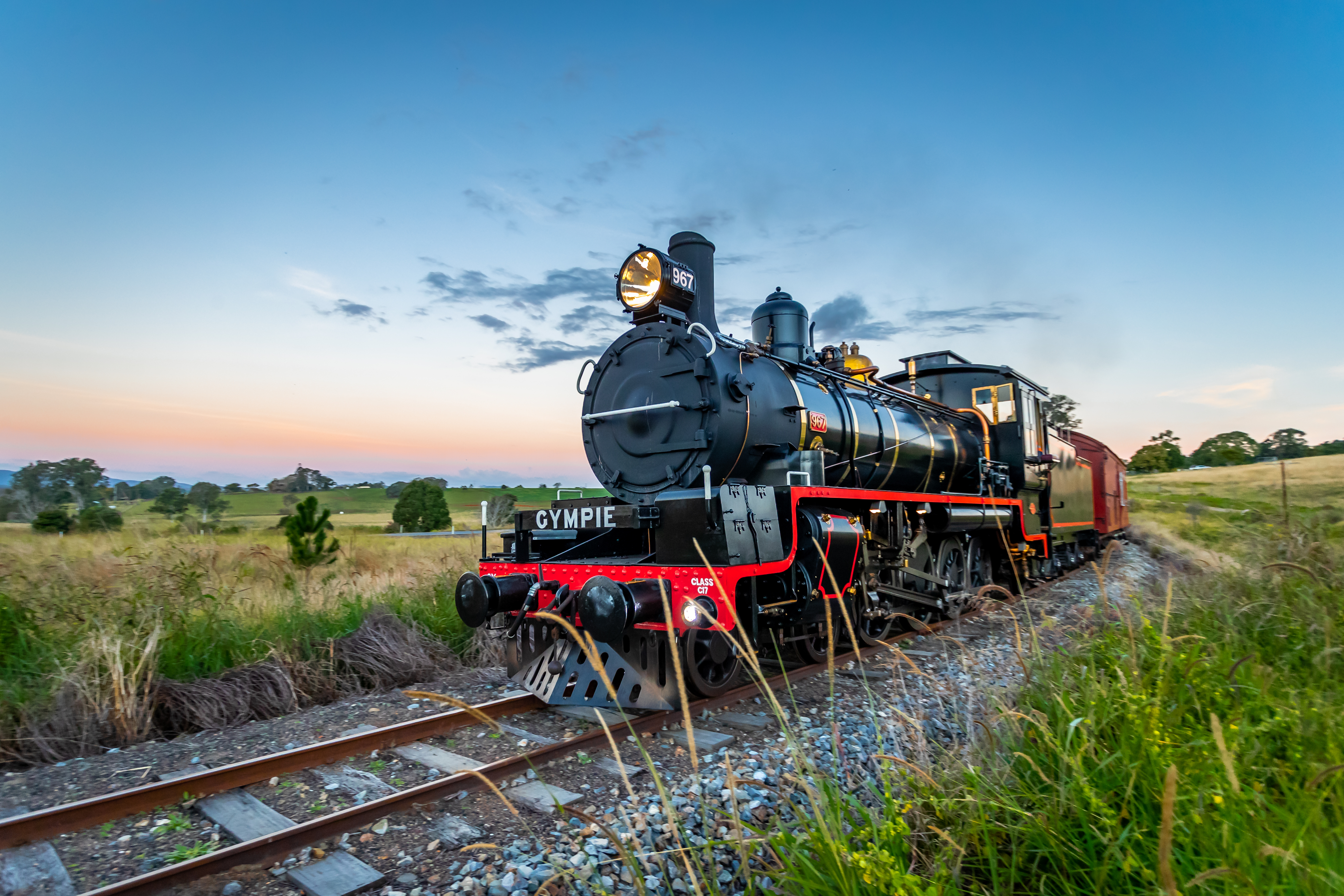
The Mary Valley Rattler C17 Locomotive 967

The Gympie Gold Mining and Historical Museum houses memorabilia from the early gold mining era, as well as displays showcasing military, rural, transport, communications, and steam development in Australia. The WoodWorks Museum provides an insight into the timber industry and social history of yesteryear through displays and demonstrations. Features include a large selection of pioneering hand tools, a 1925 Republic truck, bullock wagons, and a blacksmith shop.

The Valley Rattler steam train is a tourist train that began operations in 1996. It follows the Mary River through the forests and plantations of the Mary Valley to Amamoor. The train departs and returns to the Old Gympie Railway Station in Tozer Street, an original railway station from the 1900s gold rush.

Approximately 25 kilometres (16 mi) south of Gympie, the town of Amamoor hosts the annual Gympie Music Muster. It is held over six days and nights in August in the Amamoor Forest Reserve. The muster is the largest outdoor country music festival in Australia.

Gympie's Mary St offers a wide array of bars, cafes, and shops with 19th-century Victorian architecture. The historic Railway Hotel was built in 1915 and is listed on the Queensland Heritage Register. The Gympie Town Hall Reserve Complex, built in 1890, was added to the Queensland Heritage Register in 2011.

Mothar Mountain Speedway is Gympie's local speedway track. With a history spanning over 50 years, its most well-known feature is the unique right-hand kink. The venue hosts a variety of classes, including SSA Modified Sedans, SSA Super Sedans, SSA Junior Sedans, SSA Production Sedans, SSA Street Stocks, Modlites, and Late Models. The speedway has hosted the Australian title for SSA Production Sedans in 2014, and was scheduled to host the Australian titles for Modlites and SSA Super Sedans in April 2023.

The annual Heart of Gold International Short Film Festival is held in Gympie in March.

About 24 km (15 mi) south-east of Gympie, Woondum National Park provides access to subtropical rainforest, creeks, and granite outcrops. Facilities include picnic tables, barbecues, firewood, fresh water, amenities, and bush-walking tracks. Access is by dirt road, and a high-clearance vehicle is recommended.

About 30 minutes' drive east of Gympie is Tin Can Bay, where one can hand-feed Indo-Pacific hump-backed dolphins. The feeding is regulated for the protection of the dolphins.

Gympie and the surrounding area are part of the Great Sandy Biosphere Reserve, listed by UNESCO as a world conservation site.

Gympie Cemetery crawls are run by the Gympie Family History Society. Participants learn about the town's pioneering families.

== Education ==
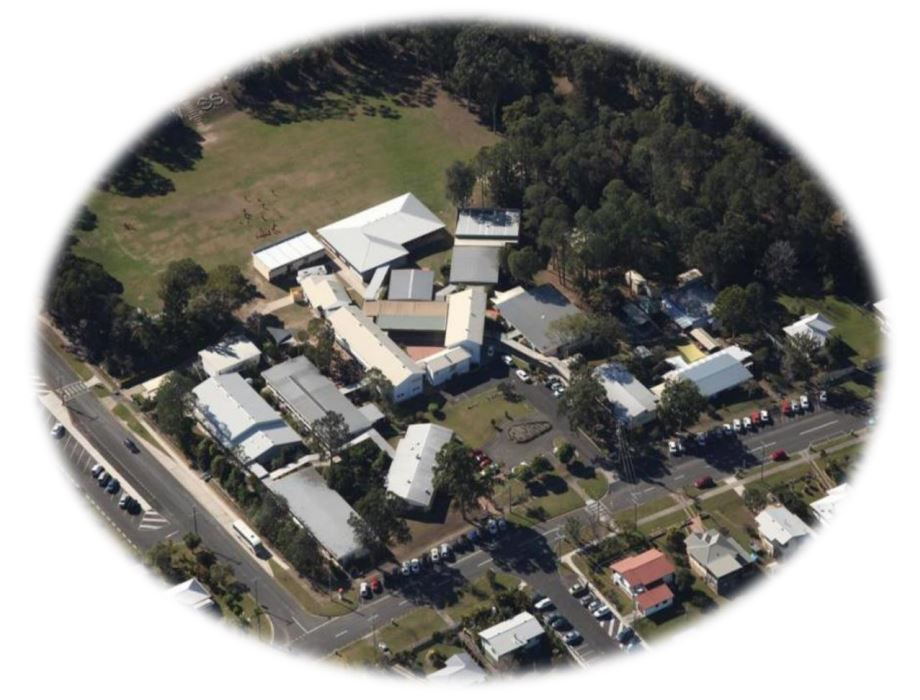
Gympie West State School, 2024

Gympie Central State School is a government primary (Prep–6) school for boys and girls at 14–20 Lawrence Street (26.1886°S 152.6646°E). In 2018, the school had an enrolment of 235 students with 18 teachers (16 full-time equivalent) and 15 non-teaching staff (10 full-time equivalent).

Gympie West State School is a government primary (Early Childhood to Year 6) school for boys and girls at 41 Cartwright Road (26.1738°S 152.6621°E). In 2018, the school had an enrolment of 524 students with 45 teachers (38 full-time equivalent) and 45 non-teaching staff (26 full-time equivalent).

One Mile State School is a government primary (Prep–6) school for boys and girls at John Street (26.1993°S 152.6753°E). In 2018, the school had an enrolment of 421 students with 37 teachers (32 full-time equivalent) and 18 non-teaching staff (12 full-time equivalent).

St Patrick's Primary School is a Catholic primary (Prep–6) school for boys and girls at 18–26 Church Street (26.1923°S 152.6656°E). In 2018, the school had an enrolment of 308 students with 21 teachers (19 full-time equivalent) and 17 non-teaching staff (11 full-time equivalent).

Gympie Special School is a special primary and secondary (Prep–12) school for boys and girls at 52 Cootharaba Road (26.1878°S 152.6808°E). In 2018, the school had an enrolment of 57 students with 19 teachers (15 full-time equivalent) and 26 non-teaching staff (15 full-time equivalent).

Gympie State High School is a government secondary (7–12) school for boys and girls at 2 Everson Road (26.1883°S 152.6781°E). In 2018, the school had an enrolment of 1,016 students with 93 teachers (86 full-time equivalent) and 51 non-teaching staff (40 full-time equivalent).

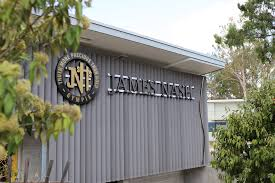
James Nash State High School, 2025

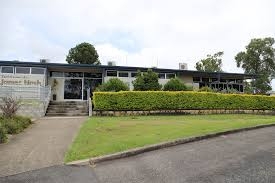
James Nash State High School, 2025

James Nash State High School is a government secondary (7–12) school for boys and girls at 109 Myall Street (26.1758°S 152.6560°E). In 2018, the school had an enrolment of 1,219 students with 113 teachers (105 full-time equivalent) and 52 non-teaching staff (41 full-time equivalent).

St Patrick's College is a Catholic secondary (7–12) school for boys and girls at Church Street (26.1924°S 152.6670°E). In 2018, the school had an enrolment of 417 students with 35 teachers (34 full-time equivalent) and 21 non-teaching staff (15 full-time equivalent).

Gympie Flexible Learning Centre is a Catholic secondary (7–12) school for boys and girls at 30 Everson Road (26.1865°S 152.6788°E). In 2018, the school had an enrolment of 89 students with 8 teachers (6 full-time equivalent) and 15 non-teaching staff (13 full-time equivalent).

Gympie is home to one campus of the Wide Bay Institute of TAFE located on Cartwright Road.

The University of the Sunshine Coast (USC) has a campus in Gympie located on Cartwright Road. This campus offers undergraduate study in primary education, nursing, business, and commerce.

== Amenities ==
The Gympie Regional Council operates a public library at 8–14 Mellor Street. It opened in 1995.

The Gympie branch of the Queensland Country Women's Association meets at the St Johns Ambulance Rooms at 20 Apollonian Vale.

Gympie Regional Uniting Church is at 15–17 Red Hill Road (26.1939°S 152.6727°E). It is part of the Mary Burnett Presbytery of the Uniting Church in Australia.

Gympie Wesleyan Methodist Church is at 70 Exhibition Road, Southside (26.2022°S 152.6436°E). It is part of the Wesleyan Methodist Church of Australia.

Two lawn bowls clubs are in Gympie:

- Gympie Bowls Club, 16 Bowlers Drive
- The Albert Bowls Club, River Road

== Transport ==
Road connection to Gympie is via the Bruce Highway. Rail connects via QR's North Coast railway line, which is served by daily Queensland Rail Citytrain network services to Brisbane and Traveltrain services for long distances. Few public buses operate in Gympie and automobiles are the main mode of transportation.

Gympie Airport is a small local airport located to the south of the city. It has general aviation, recreational aviation, and gliding communities. The nearest domestic airport is Sunshine Coast Airport, and the closest international airport is Brisbane Airport.

== Media ==
Radio stations that covered Gympie are ABC Sunshine Coast, 91.9 Sea FM, 91.1 Hot FM, and 4GY, a community-based station.

Gympie is served by 3 major free-to-air commercial television networks:

- Seven Queensland – Seven Network owned and operated
- WIN Television – Nine Network affiliate
- 10 Queensland – Network 10 owned and operated
- ABC Television
- SBS Television

== Governance ==
Eight councilors are elected to the Gympie Region local government area.

The electoral district of Gympie in the state legislature was created in 1873 and includes Tin Can Bay, Rainbow Beach, Cooran, Pomona, and parts of the Mary Valley. In 1893, Andrew Fisher was elected to the Legislative Assembly of Queensland as Labor member for Gympie and went on to become the fifth Prime Minister of Australia. Gympie's seat was eliminated in 1950 but restored in 1960. Since 1960, it has been considered a safe State Liberal-National seat having been won by the Country or National Party every election except for a brief period in the early 2000s. (It was held from 2002 to 2006 by Elisa Roberts, first as a member of the One Nation party and then as an independent, before returning to the National Party with the election of David Gibson.)

Since 2015, Tony Perrett of the Liberal National Party is the member for Gympie in the Queensland Legislative Assembly.

== Traveston Crossing Dam ==
The Queensland government had plans to build a dam on the Mary River at Traveston Crossing, about 16 km (9.9 mi) south of Gympie, arguing that the geology is sound and that the South East Queensland region needed greater water security due to climate change and population growth. The project was scrapped in 2010.

The proposed dam would have flooded about 900 properties. The affected land owners and other shire residents staged rallies protesting the proposed dam. Strong opposition to the dam from the wider and international community based on environmental concerns related to the endangered Mary River cod, Mary River turtle, giant barred frog, Cascade tree frog, and Coxen's fig parrot and the vulnerable Queensland lungfish, tusked frog, honey blue-eye fish, Richmond birdwing butterfly, and Illidge's ant blue butterfly finally shut down the project.

== Notable people ==
- The Amity Affliction – metalcore band
- John Francis (Frank) Barnes – politician
- John O'Connell Bligh – Native Police Commandant
- Allan Boase – Australian Army Lieutenant General
- Henry Ernest Boote – writer
- Glen Boss – jockey
- Archie Bradley – boxer
- Jimmy Downey – football player
- Thomas Dunstan – politician
- Hugo William Du Rietz – gold miner, architect
- Iszac Fa'asuamaleaui – NRL Rugby League Player
- Tino Fa'asuamaleaui – NRL Rugby League Player
- Andrew Fisher – Australian Prime Minister
- John Flood – Fenian and newspaperman
- Sir Thomas William Glasgow – Australian Army Major General
- Kaden Groves – professional cyclist
- Darren Hanlon – musician
- Peter Hanlon – sports writer
- Kenneth Hayne – Supreme Court Justice
- Trevor Housley – Postmaster-General
- Angus Finlay Hutton – naturalist
- Thelma Keane – businesswoman
- Lachlan Keeffe – AFL player
- James Kidgell – politician
- Tracey Lewis – Paralympic swimmer
- George Mackay – politician
- Barry McTaggart – rugby player
- Mathew Mellor – politician
- James Nash – prospector
- Francis Isidore Power – politician
- Gregory Charles Rivers – actor
- Marjorie Roche – Red Cross nurse
- Christopher Scott – Paralympic cyclist
- Sir Christopher Sheehy – dairy industry administrator
- Ann Caroline Sherry AO – businesswoman
- Jacob Stumm – newspaper owner
- Harry Sunderland – rugby administrator
- Estelle Thompson – crime novelist
- Vivian Tozer – politician
- Harry Frederick Walker – Member of the Queensland Legislative Assembly

== See also ==
- The Gympie Times, a current newspaper
- The Gympie Miner, a former newspaper
- Gympie Cemetery
- Djaki kundu
