= Marjorie Roche =

Marjorie Clare Roche (21 January 1896—8 June 1982) was an Australian nurse and army officer, active in the Red Cross. Born in Gympie, Queensland, she became a member of the local Voluntary Aid Detachment (VAD) in 1914, serving as a secretary and working at a number of convalescent hospitals til 1921. She was demobilised and retired in 1947, having been given "the commandant-in-chief's card for outstanding service".

Roche enlisted in the Australian Army Nursing Service on 17 September 1941 as a junior clerk, and was promoted to acting-sergeant in September 1942. By 21 October 1942 Roche was appointed assistant-controller (quartermaster) of VADs, Northern Command.

She was also a member of the National Council of Women and the War Widows Guild of Queensland, represented the State division on the Florence Nightingale Committee of Australia and the Queensland Bush Nursing Association and was a life member of the AAMWS Association. Roche enjoyed hand weaving, tapestry and dressmaking in her free time.
