= Surface Hill Uniting Church =

Surface Hill Uniting Church (former)
- City Church; Surface Hill Methodist Church; Wesleyan/Wesley Church
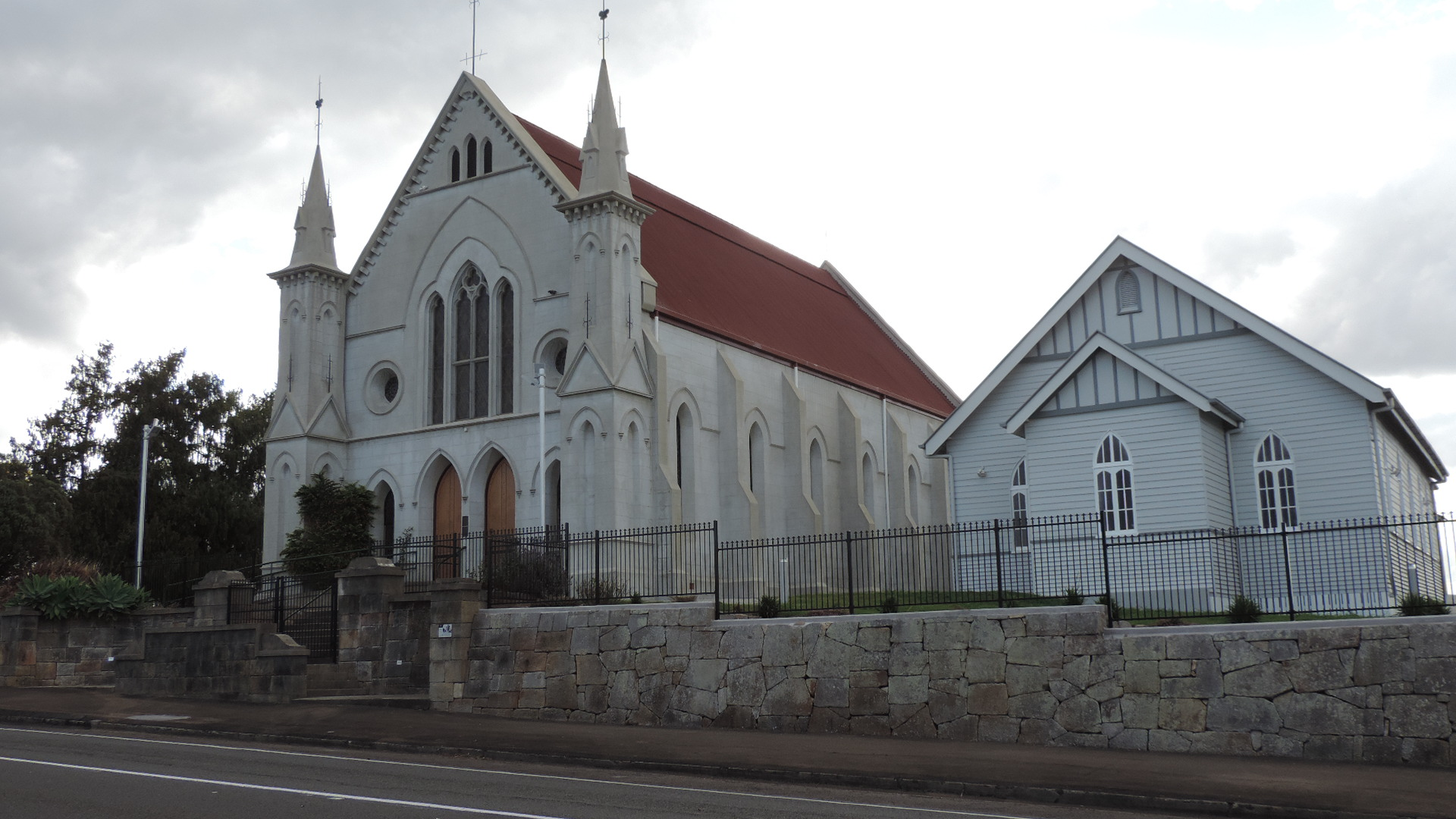
- The former Surface Hill Uniting Church, 2015
- Surface Hill Uniting Church (former)
- 26°11′20″S 152°39′26″E
- Address: Channon Street, Surface Hill, Gympie, Gympie Region, Queensland
- Country: Australia
- Previous denomination: Methodist (1890–1977); Uniting (1977–2013)

History
- Status: Funeral home (since 2013); Church (1890–2013)
- Founded: 30 January 1890
- Dedicated: 7 August 1890

Architecture
- Functional status: Preserved
- Architect: Hugo William Du Rietz
- Architectural type: Church
- Style: Gothic Revival
- Years built: 1869–1937
- Construction cost: A£1905
- Closed: 7 April 2013

Queensland Heritage Register
- Official name: Surface Hill Uniting Church, City Church, Surface Hill Methodist Church, Wesleyan/Wesley Church
- Type: State heritage (built, landscape)
- Designated: 30 May 2003
- Reference no.: 601529
- Significant period: 1860s, 1890s, 1930s (historical) ongoing (social)
- Significant components: Church, stained glass window/s, garden/grounds, memorial – honour board/ roll of honour, views to, wall/s – retaining, furniture/fittings, hall
- Builders: J McMorrine

Surface Hill Uniting Church is a heritage-listed former Uniting church at Channon Street, Surface Hill, Gympie, Gympie Region, Queensland, Australia. It was designed by architect Hugo William Du Rietz and built from 1869 to 1937. It is also known as City Church, Surface Hill Methodist Church and Wesleyan/Wesley Church. It was added to the Queensland Heritage Register on 30 May 2003.

== History ==
Surface Hill Uniting Church, constructed in 1890 and designed by architect Hugo William Du Rietz, is the third church building to be built on the prominent site on Channon Street at the crest of Surface Hill in Gympie.

=== First Wesleyan Church ===
In August 1868, Wesleyan Methodists erected a bark hut of pole construction on Surface Hill to use as a basic chapel. The Methodists were early in their efforts in establishing a place of worship on the goldfields, the Primitive Methodists had opened the "Digger's Bethel" only months after James Nash had made his momentous discovery of gold in 1867. Concurrent with building the bark hut, the Wesleyan Methodists were planning the construction of a new and more substantial church, under the auspice of the Maryborough circuit.

=== Second Wesleyan Church ===
An early committee resolved to build a new church on the same site and local architect Charles G. Smith was commissioned to prepare drawings for a timber church. The tender was let to John Nesbit and it appears that there was some sort of disagreement between this builder and the architect and the architect's name was removed from the drawings. Despite this, on Sunday, 4 July, the new church was opened. The building faced on to Reef Street. By October a small three-roomed parsonage was built on the site.

The Wesleyans were consolidating their presence in the town, however, uncertainty persisted about the land tenure as the church had been built on land that was held without a proper title. Although the land had been purchased by members of the church committee at a land sale in 1869 and set aside as a church reserve in the first town survey in 1874, it was not officially secured until 1876. It appears that these difficulties were due to the land being under Miner's Right. Indeed, mining was still taking place all over Surface Hill at this time, a whim is visible in a photo of the opening ceremony of the brick church in 1890 and at several points in time the church had to pay for shafts to be filled in for safety reasons.

In 1870, a full-time minister was appointed and two rooms and a verandah were added to the parsonage. By 1879, the parsonage was in a dilapidated condition and fund-raising began for the construction of a new one, which was completed in 1880. In 1889, Mathew Mellor, a prominent member of the congregation and church trustee moved that a new brick church to accommodate 250 people, be erected. Minutes of church meetings indicate that the construction of a more solid church had been in the minds of many members of the congregation for a number of years and suggests "that Gympie was a stable prosperous town, with a stable, committed population, who had enough faith and vision to build for the future." Both the Catholic and Anglican churches also built masonry churches in the town around this time.

=== Third Wesleyan Church ===
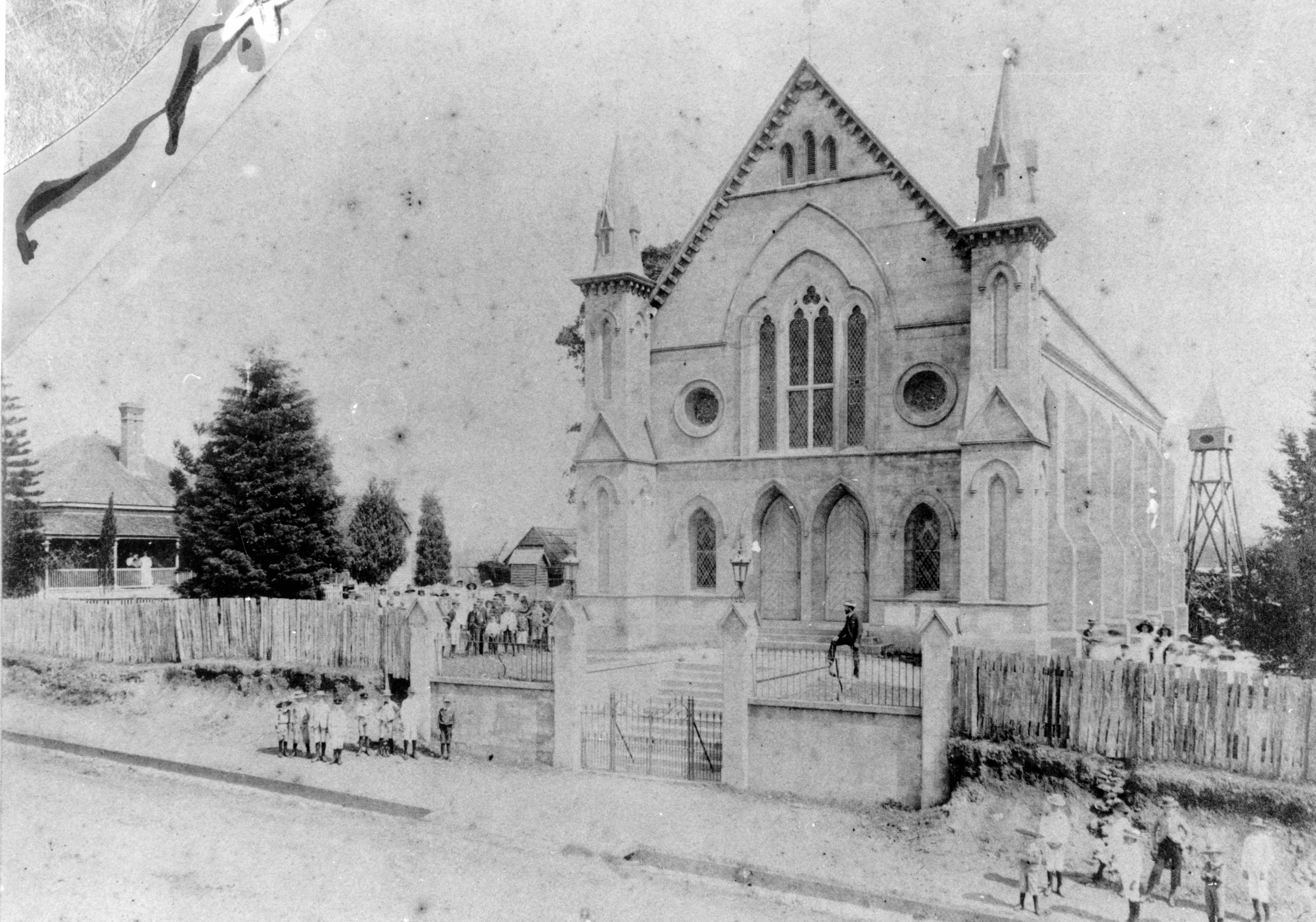
Surface Hill Methodist Church, c. 1900.

Local Gympie architect Hugo Du Rietz was commissioned to design the new church and plans were presented to the church trust in July 1889. Du Rietz was born in Sweden and came to Australia in 1852, taking up residence in Gympie around 1867 and staying there until his death in 1908. He was a prolific designer of buildings for the town and "was probably responsible for a number of distinctive local building features, such as ogee-profiled verandah roofs, close-spaced studs with cut-in angle braces and a distinctive colour scheme of cream walls and red roofs."

The church was substantial but simple in design. It was to be constructed of brick and rendered in concrete with Gothic Revival detailing. Tenders were called and the lowest tender of a Mr J. McMorrine of A£1905 was accepted.

A whole series of elaborate celebrations were held to mark the construction of the new church. A stone-laying ceremony was held on 30 January 1890. Eight large foundation stones were laid by prominent members of the congregation, a representative of the local preachers and one of the Sunday school scholars. An earthenware jar was placed under the first stone that was laid and it contained a copy of that day's Gympie Times, the previous day's Gympie Miner, The Weekly Advocate, The Christian Witness, the circuit plan, a programme of the proposed proceedings of the ceremony, the society ticket for the last quarter (a Methodist membership ticket), a list of the Trustees and officers of the church, a list of the names of the teachers and officers of the Sunday school, the names of the architect, the contractor and an estimate of the cost and fittings of the building. Each stone-layer was presented with a "polished cedar mallet bearing a chaste silver plate beautifully inscribed." One of these is held in the Gympie Historical Museum.

On 7 August 1890, the church was officially opened and a dedication service was held. A fine organ was purchased by the church from James Lord, the organist from the Albert Street Methodist Church. The organ, along with the one in the Albert Street church, had been made by George Benson of Manchester, UK, in 1888 and assembled by Benson in Brisbane. The final cost of the building, including seating, architect's commission, fittings, gas lights, pipe organ, retaining wall, lightning conductors and opening ceremonies was £3137/16/5.

The timber church was renovated and used as the Sunday School. The Methodist Church continued to have a solid presence in the town and church news was regularly reported in the Gympie Times and frequently the full text of a sermon would be published. In 1904, the Reverend Harry Youngman addressed the Chinese members of the congregation in their own language, an event which attracted hundreds of people, non-Chinese and non-Methodists alike. Small repairs were carried out on the church, hall and parsonage and it was not until the 1930s that any more substantial work was carried out on the site.

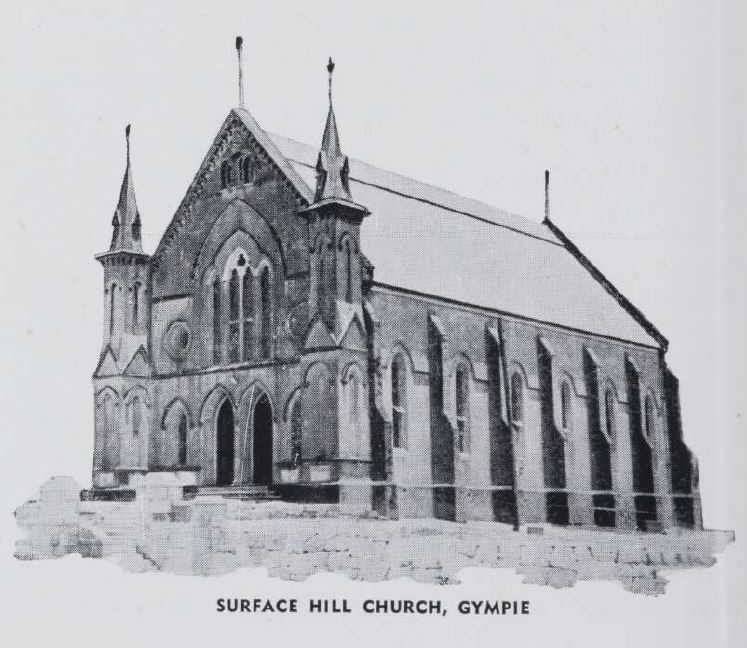
Surface Hill Methodist Church, c. 1947.

In 1937, a representation was made to the Queensland Government for the use of relief labour to construct a stone retaining wall along the frontage to Reef and Channon Streets. The church provided materials - a member of the congregation donated the stone and the government paid wages. The job took over eighteen months to complete and was opened by Frank Cooper, the Queensland Treasurer to coincide with the church's seventieth anniversary. He said at the time that "I believe this wall will speak to you every time you come past it as of honest work earnestly done, it will also look at you (for walls have eyes) and will judge you whether you are doing your part in upholding the ideal for which it stands...it stands in perpetual reminder that work and worship go hand in hand." The relief labour went on to also construct a tennis court, lay paths and grade the church grounds. In the same year, the hall (the old church) was moved across the property and re-located to face Barter Street.

A new two-storey hall was erected at the eastern end of the site in 1962. The timber parsonage was demolished in 1975 and replaced with a low-set brick building. Restoration work was undertaken on the church from 1977 to 1984 and included work on the stained glass windows, organ and exterior render and ramps were added to the church and hall.

In April 2013, the former church was sold to a local funeral director with the last church service held on 7 April 2013.

== Description ==
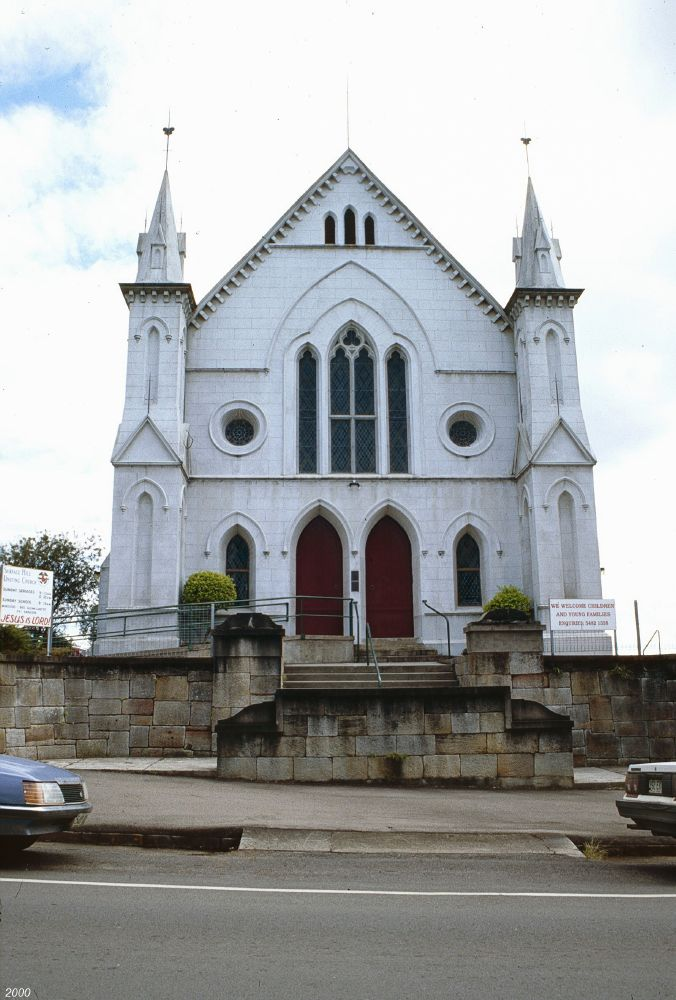
Street facade, 2000

The former Surface Hill Uniting Church is a load-bearing masonry and cement rendered building that sits with a group of other buildings within the Uniting Church precinct on Surface Hill in Gympie. The site also contains a timber hall (the former church, built in 1869), a masonry and fibro hall (1962) and a brick parsonage (1975). The building is an unpretentious interpretation of Gothic style, using Gothic motifs yet simple and restrained in its overall design and composition. The street facade (southern elevation) is the most ornate with towers at each corner, lancet and rose windows and other moulded decorations. The church is rectilinear in form, divided into six bays by stepped buttresses, each bay containing a lancet window. The roof is steeply pitched and clad in colourbonded corrugated steel with lightning conductors at each gable end.

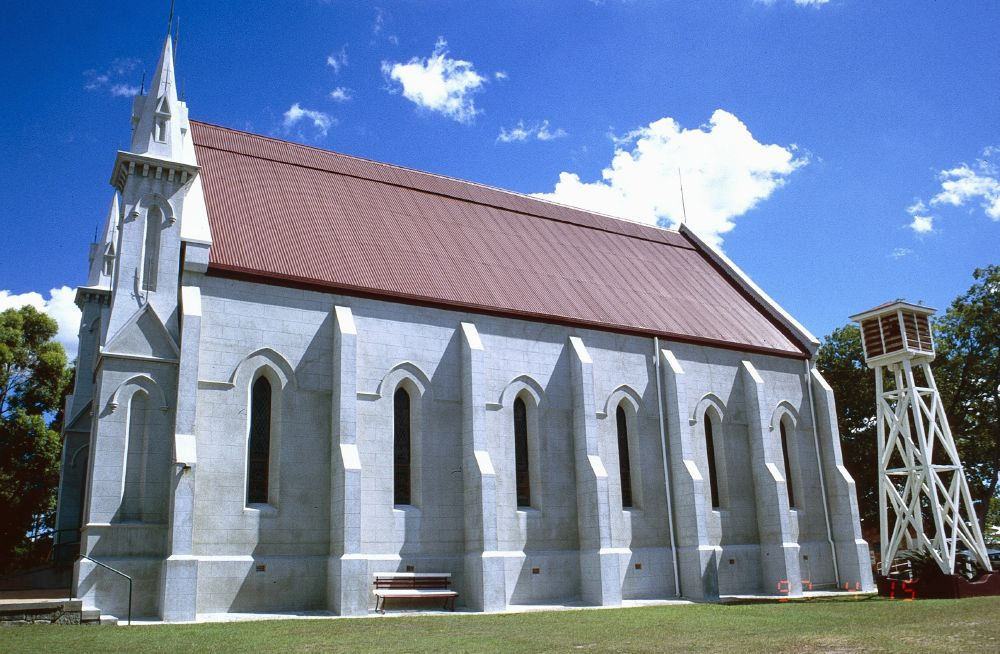
Side view of the buttresses, 1997

The interior of the former church is also cement-rendered with a decorative cornice and mouldings around the windows and at dado and picture rail height. Engaged columns with decorative capitals mark each of the bays internally. The lofty space of the interior has a vaulted ceiling lined in timber VJ boarding braced with timber ribs and punctuated with ceiling roses with timber fretwork. Light fittings and ceiling fans are suspended from the ceiling on stiff rods. Lancet windows infilled with diamond-patterned leadlight with glass in pale tones are located along the side walls and the southern elevation has an arrangement of four similar windows highset in the wall, flanked by two stained glass rose windows. Most of the windows are now framed in aluminium.

The former church is entered via two doors which lead into a small, internal porch-like space enclosed with dark stained timber. An Honour Roll is located within this space, alongside a noticeboard and a set of wall- mounted timber cabinets with leadlight doors. Lancet doors are located on both sides of this space. The main part of the former church has a raked timber floor and timber pews which have recently been restored. The side aisles are carpeted. A raised platform enclosed with low timber rails at the front of the former church is also carpeted, containing a simple timber altar and elders' chairs. A hexagonal timer pulpit is located to the left of the communion table area and is decorated with a timber veneered depiction of the Uniting Church symbol. A recent timber screen separates the raised choir platform and organ loft. Doors are located at either end of this divider and provide access to the choir area and through to the two exit doors at the back of the church. A small library and sink is located on the eastern side of the choir and a vestry area on the west.

The fine organ is an outstanding feature of the interior. The pipes of the organ are hand-painted in tones of blue with cream and gold. The organ is framed by a section of wall with a moulded edge and a lancet arch at the top that has been painted tan against the otherwise cream walls and flanked by columns either side.

The former church is located at the north west corner of the site and is used as a hall for a range of church and community activities as well as accommodating the parish office. It a small timber building with a steeply pitched roof and a small porch, separately roofed, on the eastern side. The building is set on short concrete stumps and clad in weatherboards that are narrow up to sill height and then standard width above that. Windows are multi-paned casements with lancet arched tops. Gable ends are finished in sheet material decorated with vertical timber strips. The interior is lined with horizontal tongue-in-groove boarding and has an open ceiling with exposed scissor trusses. Some of these have been stiffened with steel rods. A raised stage is to be found at the back of the hall and is framed with a wide moulded timber architrave surmounted by a timber hymnboard. Timber floors are throughout. The office is housed in a hipped roof annexe at the western end of the building, facing Barter street.

The site boundary for part of Barter Street and all of Channon and Reef Streets is finished with a squared uncoursed rubble retaining wall. A concrete stair and landing is cut into the wall to provide access to the church.

== Heritage listing ==
The former Surface Hill Uniting Church was listed on the Queensland Heritage Register on 30 May 2003 having satisfied the following criteria:

The place is important in demonstrating the evolution or pattern of Queensland's history.

The former Surface Hill Uniting Church, constructed in 1890, is important in demonstrating the evolution of Queensland's history, representing the rapid growth of the town of Gympie and the establishment and development of religious, social and cultural institutions in the town during the 1880s and 90s as a result of the prosperity of the goldfields. In addition, the church demonstrates the growth and consolidation of the Methodist Church in regional Queensland and local community efforts in meeting their spiritual needs.

The place demonstrates rare, uncommon or endangered aspects of Queensland's cultural heritage.

The Benson organ of the former Surface Hill Uniting Church demonstrates rare and uncommon aspects of Queensland cultural heritage. One of only two such organs in Queensland, it is a rare example of its age and make and has been kept in its original design and sound.

The place is important in demonstrating the principal characteristics of a particular class of cultural places.

The stone retaining wall along Reef and Channon Streets is important as an example of work undertaken by relief labour as part of a co-operative scheme between the church and state during the Depression.

The former Surface Hill Uniting Church is a good example of church architecture practiced at the end of the nineteenth century and as an example of the work of Hugo Durietz.

The place is important because of its aesthetic significance.

The former church has aesthetic significance and has been an important landmark in the Gympie townscape since its construction. It is an imposing building on a prominent site, one of a family of churches located on top of the hills of Gympie. The simple and attractive interior has a number of noteworthy features, in particular the beautiful organ with hand-painted pipes.

The place has a strong or special association with a particular community or cultural group for social, cultural or spiritual reasons.

The former Surface Hill Uniting Church has a strong spiritual and social association with the Wesleyan Methodist Circuit and Surface Hill congregation in Gympie as the principal place of worship in Gympie for over 130 years.

The place has a special association with the life or work of a particular person, group or organisation of importance in Queensland's history.

It has special association with Du Rietz, a local Gympie architect who made a significant contribution to the architectural character of the town.
