= Gympie Pyramid =

Terraced hill in Queensland, Australia

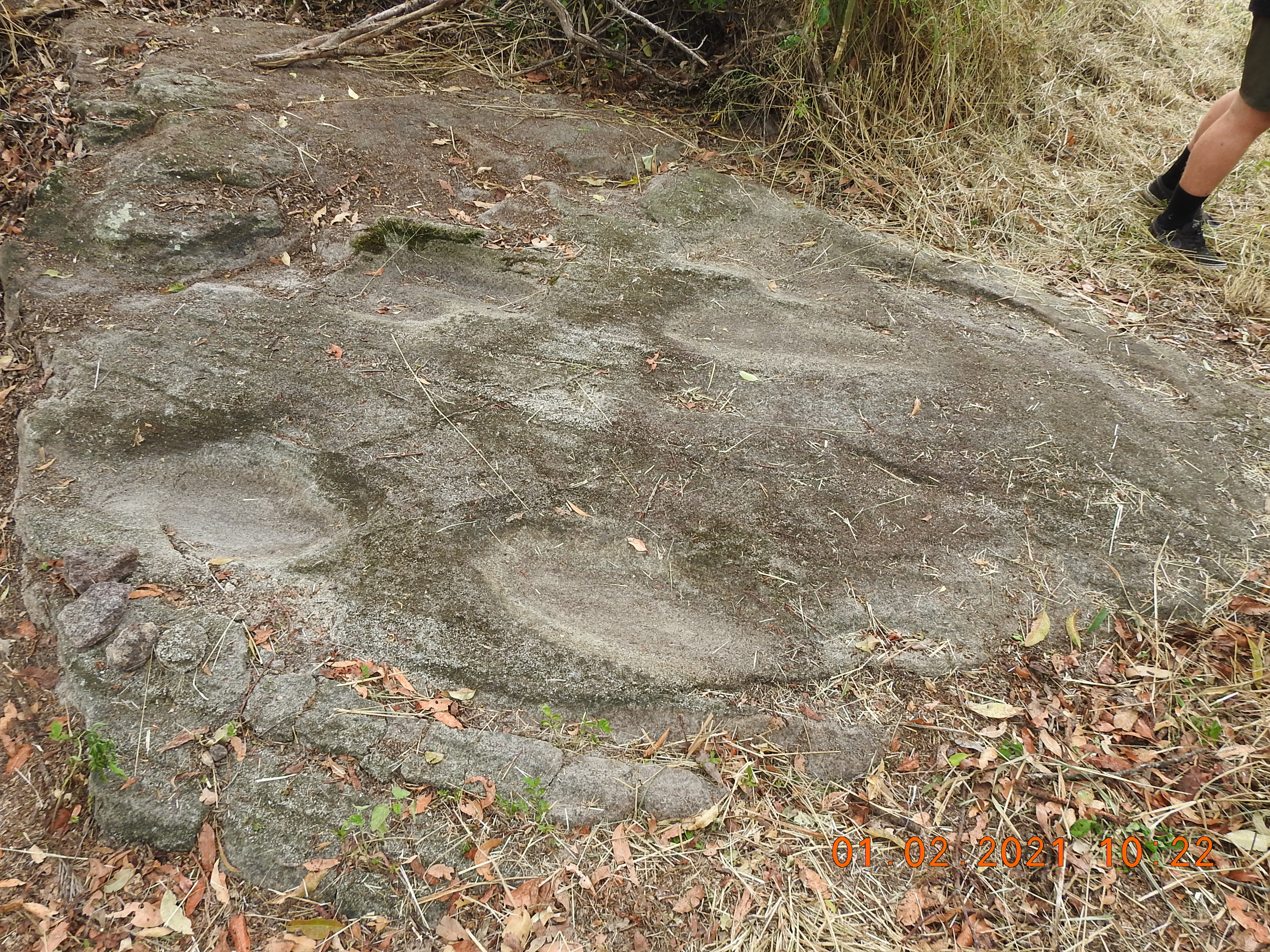
- Grinding grooves on Rocky Ridge.
- Interactive map of Gympie Pyramid
- 26.1690°S 152.6930°E
- Type: Hill
- Location: 63 Gympie Connection Rd, Victory Heights QLD 4570, Australia
- Region: Gympie Region

Site notes
- Height: 30 m (98 ft)

The Gympie Pyramid is a nickname for an archaeological site otherwise known as Rocky Ridge, or Djaki Kundu by the Gubbi Gubbi/ Kabi Kabi people. It consists of the rounded eastern end of a sandstone ridge, and is located on the Gympie Connection Road, some 5 km (3.1 mi) north-east of the town of Gympie in Queensland, Australia.

It includes the ruins of six or seven low terraces associated with early settlers. Modern scholars have debunked a variety of alternative theories that claim that the site was constructed by extra-terrestrials, ancient Egyptians, Phoenicians, the Mayans, or that the Chinese built a pyramid on the site. There is a disputed claim as to the Aboriginal significance of the site.

== History ==
The earliest evidence of use of the site is the presence of several large grinding grooves in rocks at the top of the ridge, suggesting that the site has been used from before the first English settlers reached the continent. Multiple scar trees can also be found on the site.

A group of Kabi Kabi (also known as Gubbi Gubbi) people claim this specific area was an ancient sacred site important for their dreaming, and connected with a stellar origin story concerning the seven sisters, or Pleiades, although this claim is disputed by the traditional owners of the area according to local historian Elaine Brown.

In 1868, government geologist D’Oyly Aplin described the ridge as "a stratified quartz pebble drift of older date than the existing valleys... in a large pocket of the creek known as McPherson’s Paddock". W. H. Rands, also a geologist, described Rocky Ridge in 1889 as "a drift of water-worn pebbles... consisting of quartz and of hardened, waterworn sandstone". Neither made any mention of a pyramid shape. By the time of the second observation, McPherson’s Paddock had been surveyed for the purposes of gold mining leases, one of which had been taken up in 1875 by a Swiss miner with an interest in horticulture, named John William Cauper.

The stone walls are thought to be the ruins of a terraced vineyard built by Cauper. Cauper owned the land between 1875 and 1890. In 1884 Cauper wrote an article in the Gympie Times demonstrating his extensive knowledge of vine growing and grafting. In 1905, the Gympie Times described the area as "the old vineyard".

In 1938 a retaining wall, featuring polygonally-cut stone, was built at the Surface Hill Uniting Church by relief workers, at a cost of £3000.

== Aboriginal site dispute ==
The Queensland Government started work on upgrading the Bruce Highway, involving the construction of a four-lane divided highway between Gympie and Curra, in October 2020, with the new section is due to open in 2024.

However a group of local Kabi Kabi people say that Djaki Kundu is a sacred site, which had been used for their gatherings and ceremonies for a long time, and had connections to the songlines of the seven sisters, the water spirit and four fish dreamings. Work was suspended in November 2020 after the matter was sent to an independent assessor, a specialist in First Nations matters, but the area was deemed not of sufficient significance to be protected. After work was resumed following "a final decision from the Federal Environment Minister", protesters tried to block the site, but were removed by police and five people were arrested for trespassing.

Elaine Brown says that the names and stories of the recognised traditional owners of the area are shown in historical records, and that the descendants of those people do not agree with the group currently protesting construction on the site.

== Alternative theories ==
Writing in the Omega Science Digest (2004), Anthony G. Wheeler discussed several assumptions made by amateur archaeologists over the decades in his article "In quest of Australia's lost pyramids".

Rex Gilroy claimed that he discovered the Gympie Pyramid in 1975 and that the "pyramid" was created by Egyptians who had mining operations in Australia centuries ago. According to Gilroy, the terraced hill was the remains of a pyramid, based on the fact that a stone wall nearby was of unusual construction, there had been local legends and taboos about entering the area, and that there was cactus of South or Central American origin growing nearby. In addition, "a statue (the 'Iron Man' or 'Gympie Ape') of non-Aboriginal manufacture [had been] found nearby, and some crude inscriptions on a stone block dug up in the area".

An amateur archaeologist, Marilyn N. Pye, became convinced that the "pyramid" and other features were evidence of ancient settlement in Australia by the Incas of South America. The debunked pseudohistorian Gavin Menzies claimed that it was "direct and persuasive evidence of the Chinese visits to Australia" and that "its size, height and shape are typical of Ming Dynasty observation platforms".

However, Wheeler argues that the claims of an extraordinary origin for the pyramid are unfounded, writing that the Gympie "Golden" pyramid is in fact a hill that had been terraced by early Italian immigrants for viticulture. The shape was due to erosion and the stones from the retaining walls having been removed for other uses. He says that all of the statements supporting other theories were either misquoted, deliberately falsified or fabricated.

Marilyn Pye also suggested the stones used in the construction of the church's retaining wall in 1938 (see above) had been removed from the pyramid. Wheeler, along with local historian Dick Gould and Elaine Brown (former history officer of Gympie Regional Council) have dismissed this claim. Reverend Stan Geddes has said the church's stone was quarried in the Rocks Road Area.

A 2008 cultural heritage survey was conducted by Archaeo Culture Heritage Services of Brisbane (for the Department of Transport and Main Roads), to investigate the historical cultural heritage of the hill. The report came to the conclusion that there is "no evidence to support claims that the terraces on Rocky Ridge were part of a 'pyramid' built by ancient Egyptian, Phoenician, Extra-terrestrial, Mayan or Chinese visitors".

=== Claims for other finds ===
The "Gympie Ape" is a carved stone statue discovered in 1966 by Dal Berry while ploughing a paddock close to the Gympie pyramid site. In 1978 Rex Gilroy claimed the statue was verified by unnamed experts as being a 3000-year-old statue of the Egyptian god Thoth. It is currently on display at the Gympie Gold Mining and Historical Museum. Wheeler believes it was probably carved by Chinese gold prospectors.

The "Sun Stone", a crudely shaped obelisk, was found in a swampy area near Gympie. The stone is decorated with an inscription of a symbolic sun and two bowing snakes facing away from each other. Claims were made that it was examined by a university and that the examination showed that the inscriptions were made using soft metal tools, not modern tools, and that an archaeologist confirmed that Aboriginal people had not made them. However, no such examination has been found and when interviewed, the archaeologist denied that he had even seen the inscriptions. Wheeler reported that the archaeologist also "described how investigation of the stone wall and Gympie Ape statue by a colleague in the Archeology Branch of the Queensland Department of Community Services had produced no support at all for the claimed existence of pyramids in the Gympie area".

The summit of the pyramid was claimed to have a megalithic stone circle, which early settlers allegedly described as thirteen pillars surrounding a round stone table with a hollow centre. Brett Green released a photograph of the summit, later debunked by Elaine Brown as being a photograph of Filitosa, a megalithic site in southern Corsica, France. Green also claimed the Gympie Ape was one of six statues found near the Gympie pyramid. In 2000 he published photographs of five other reptilian statues which had "gone missing". He later confessed to Brown that the images were fake.
