= Gympie Ambulance Station =

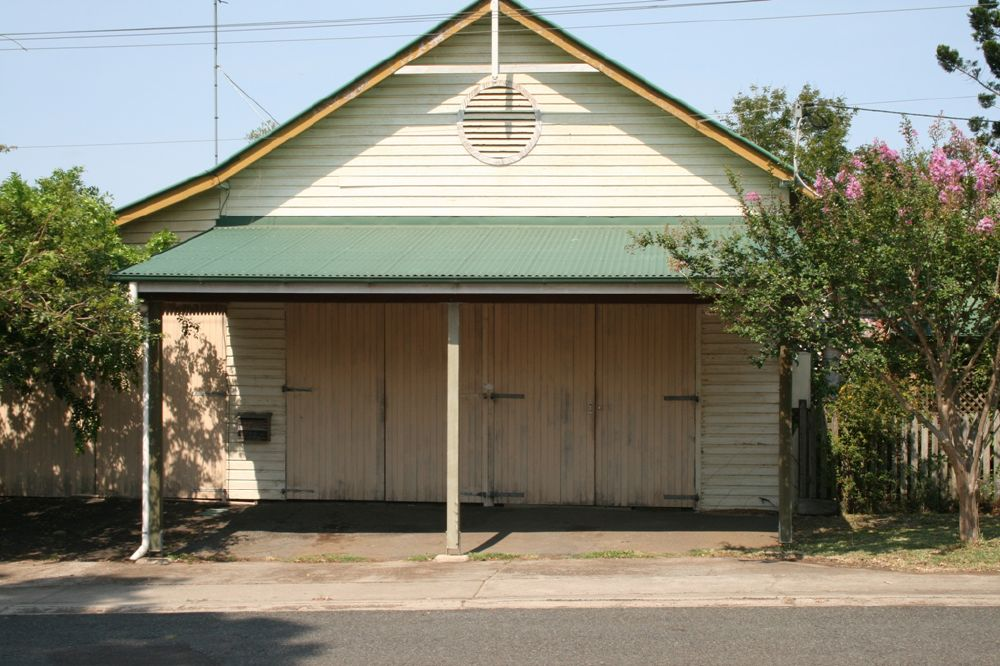
- Former Gympie Ambulance Station, 2009

- Location within Queensland Location within Australia
- 26.195°S 152.6714°E
- Location: 17 Crown Road, Gympie, Queensland, Australia

History
- Design period: 1900–1914 (early 20th century)
- Built: 1904

Queensland Heritage Register
- Official name: Gympie Ambulance Station (former)
- Type: state heritage (built)
- Designated: 16 September 2011
- Reference no.: 602794
- Significant period: 1904–1955
- Significant components: ambulance/first aid centre

Gympie Ambulance Station is a heritage-listed ambulance station at 17 Crown Road, Gympie, Queensland, Australia. It was built in 1904. It was added to the Queensland Heritage Register on 16 September 2011.

== History ==
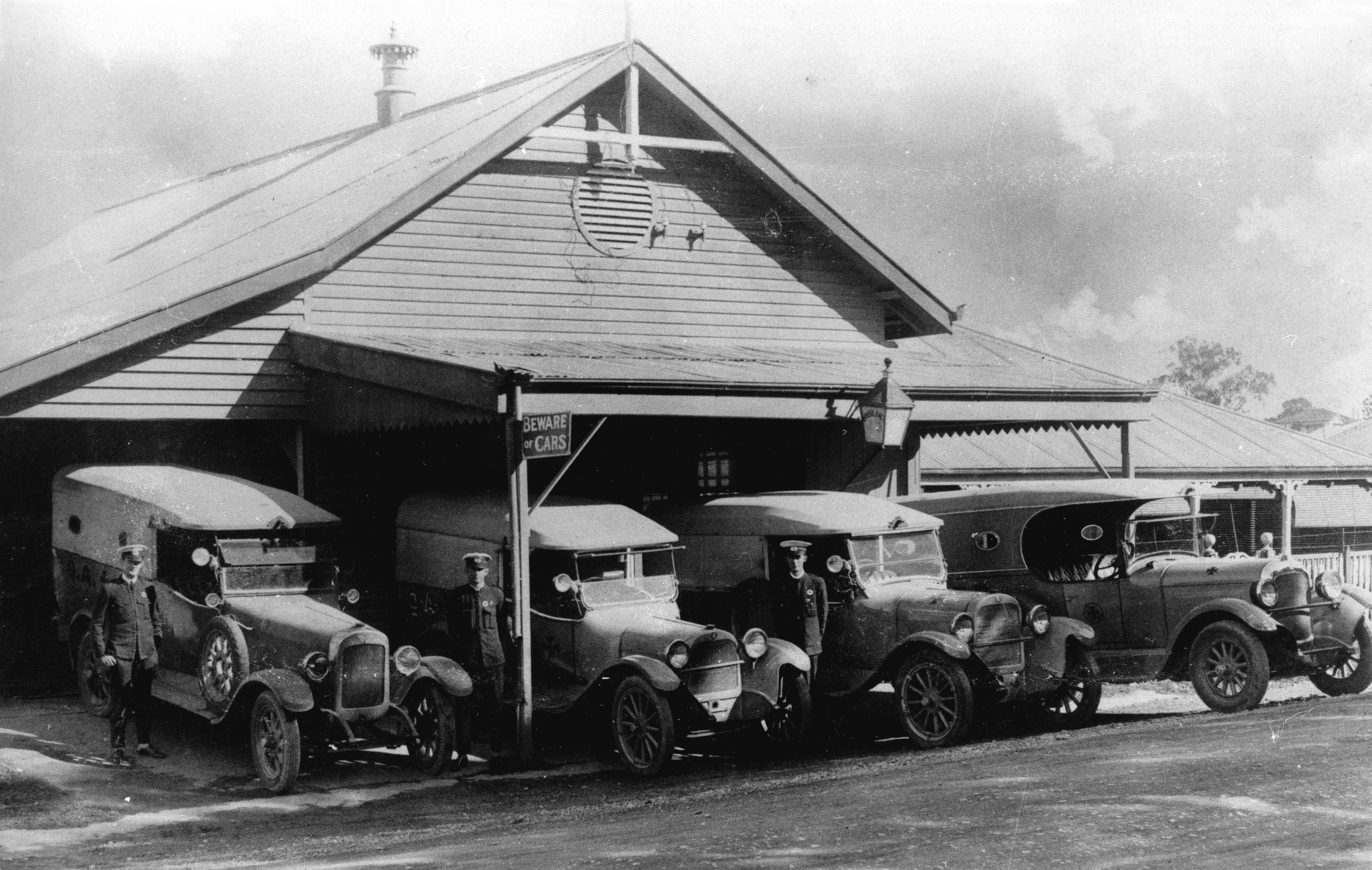
Gympie Ambulance Centre, circa 1926

Gympie (initially called Nashville) was established after the discovery of gold in October 1867 by James Nash in the Upper Mary River district. The new gold field put Queensland on the map as a significant gold producer, contributing much needed finances to the young colony. By Christmas of 1867, according to the Gold Commissioner, the Gympie field had a population of 4,000 (or over 15,000 according to James Nash). Although the alluvial deposits were quickly exhausted, from 1868 shallow reef mining occurred.

As it evolved from a hastily established mining settlement, Gympie developed a distinctive character with an irregular street pattern amid a series of valleys and ridges. Development of roads within the town followed the terrain rather than adopting the standard grid pattern that was applied to townships surveyed for settlement, and consequently many roads run along ridgelines with linking roads across valleys and hillsides. Existing buildings and mining homestead leases were accommodated in the first survey of the township in April 1868. The early makeshift structures of Gympie gradually gave way to more permanent and substantial public and private buildings.

By the end of the 1870s, an intensive phase of underground reef mining was underway, facilitated by the injection of share-holding capital into mining companies for machinery and employees. During the early 1880s mines began yielding large amounts of gold, marking a new era of wealth and prosperity for Gympie. The Gympie goldfield passed through its most profitable period from 1901 to 1906 and in 1903 produced its peak annual output. After 1906 production declined and by 1925 the last of the big mines had ceased operations, ending a 50-year phase of deep reef mining in Gympie.

Community based ambulance services first appeared in Queensland from the 1890s. In 1892, concerns regarding the lack of adequate medical aid for accident victims led to the establishment of the City Ambulance Transport Brigade in Brisbane, the Queensland Ambulance Transport Brigade (QATB) from 1902. The objective of the brigade was to provide first aid and to transport sick and injured people to hospital. During the early 1900s, ambulance brigades were established in regional centres throughout Queensland – Charters Towers and Townsville (1900), Rockhampton, Warwick and Ipswich (1901), Ravenswood, Gympie and Toowoomba (1902), Mackay (1903), Cairns (1904) and Bundaberg (1907). While some were affiliated with the QATB, others were established independently. The goldfields of Charters Towers, Ravenswood and Gympie, with large working populations of miners, were among the first to establish ambulance services in the state.

The earliest provision of ambulance services began in Gympie in 1890, with the establishment of the Wide Bay Gympie Ambulance Corps, a volunteer arm of the Wide Bay and Burnett Division of the Queensland Defence Force. In addition to their military based activities, the corps also provided a civic service. In 1898, the corps was disbanded. Subsequent efforts by former members to establish an ambulance service, including an attempt to have Gympie's miners subscribe were unsuccessful until a public meeting in September 1902 resolved to "form a local Ambulance Brigade Hospital". A Gympie Ambulance Transport Brigade Committee (GATBC) and subscription list were established by the end of proceedings. By the end of September, Superintendent Fred Roffe had attended to his first case (a fractured forearm).

Initially the ambulance service was conducted from a room in the Atlantic Hotel in Mary Street. Later, the service moved its plant of one first aid kit and a stretcher to a room at the Gympie Fire Station in Bligh St. Prior to the brigade establishing their own premises, the personnel grew to include 16 honorary bearers while the plant increased to four stretchers.

In April 1903, the provisions of the Hospitals Act were extended to include the Gympie Brigade, meaning that community subscriptions were matched by government funding. By early 1904, the Gympie Ambulance Transport Brigade (GATB) had acquired unoccupied land on Crown Road to build an ambulance station and superintendent's quarters. In March, the tender of Messrs Stuart and Poynton to erect a station for £133 was accepted. The architect is unknown. The station was officially opened on May 18, 1904, with Gympie Mayor Gilbert Garrick raising the Red Cross flag and handing out St John's Ambulance Association training certificates to brigade members.

The new station building was a simple rectangular gable ended timber structure with an office, lecture room and plant room (used to store stretchers and equipment) facing the entrance off Crown Road. The superintendent's residence was located next to the station. Many early ambulance buildings in Queensland followed the station layout first established at the 1897 Wharf Street headquarters of the QATB; a two-storey building incorporating ambulance service facilities at ground level and living quarters at the upper level, and large ground floor openings with bi-fold doors to allow ready access directly to the street for quick exit. While the Gympie building included the ground-floor provisions of a large front entrance, plant and other rooms for staff facilities, its single storey timber construction and detached superintendent's residence differed from other early stations. Early stations in Warwick and Ipswich also shared these characteristics.

The station's location was an important consideration for the Brigade when first established. The building now sits in a quiet suburban area, but when built was close to some of Gympie's largest mine headworks, and was conveniently positioned between the CBD and the One Mile and Monkland mining areas. In 1904 there were 1723 miners employed in Gympie. Accident data from the Department of Mines from the early 1900s amply demonstrates the range of occupational hazards (including defective explosives, rockfalls and machinery accidents) which led to injury or death for men working in Gympie's gold mines. In the period where the ambulance station attended to mining related cases there were 37 mining deaths and numerous accidents on the Gympie goldfield. The Gympie brigade used a special "Scott Tracy" stretcher, fitted with leather straps to vertically raise miners from underground. In 1910 the Queensland Governor Sir William MacGregor visited the station and was treated to a demonstration on how the stretcher was used. A 1911 photo shows the Gympie Brigade formally posed outside the station with the stretcher.

On 1 June 1905, the Ambulance Brigade's Crown Road site (Portion 8 Gympie Gold Field) was formerly gazetted as an Ambulance Brigade Reserve. In its first year of operating from their new premises the GATB attended to 655 patients. After receiving first-aid at the station, patients were either taken home, to a doctor's residence or to the Gympie hospital if further treatment was required. Bearers also transported patients who arrived to Gympie by rail from outlying areas such as Wondai and Cooroy. Demand for the service grew steadily during its first decade.

Gympie's earliest ambulance bearers walked or ran to attend to cases, carrying patients on stretchers and later on litters (two-wheeled stretchers) to the station or hospital for treatment. Bearers often travelled long distances on shifts, especially when attending to cases in rural areas outside of Gympie. While the use of a horse and sulky from mid-1912 made travelling to callouts easier, patients were still transported by litter into Gympie. 1912 was also the year a second paid officer began working for the brigade. A building to house the sulky and litters and a horse stable were erected behind the station at this time. The brigade acquired its first motor ambulance in 1917 and an awning had been added to the front of the station building by 1918. The purchase of a second car in 1920 effectively rendered the horse and sulky service obsolete. In 1920–21, the Brigade pulled down the 1912 litter shed and replaced the 1904 superintendent's residence with a single-skin, timber-framed cottage with a pyramid roof, connected to the ambulance station by a walkway.

In early 1922 further improvements were undertaken to the station building. By September 1921, the brigade was in possession of three cars, and a lack of storage space in the front plant room determined the decision to add an annex to the station. The brigade's use of the plant room at this time to store cars indicates that by 1921 the original front office space had been removed and replaced by an entrance door. The Brigade's monthly meeting in January 1922 resolved to extend along the length of the south end of the station, with a frontage of 12 ft (3.7 m), and a roof carried out on the same pitch as the 1904 building. Construction was underway by February and completed by May at a cost of £93. In 1923, the brigade began considering the purchase of an additional car and the construction of a new maintenance shed. In January 1924, the tender of AC McKennan of £143/10 for the erection of the maintenance shed, a simple gable roofed timber structure, was accepted.

Following a deputation from the Queensland Ambulance Transport Brigade in late 1922, the GATB voted to affiliate with the state body from 1 Jan 1923. By this time the QATB was composed of 44 centres across the state, with 17 centres opening in the previous two and a half years. Under a mutual transfer system, Gympie ambulance staff went to QATB headquarters in Brisbane for further training in first aid, mechanical and business skills. Lewis Dean succeeded Frederick Roffe as Superintendent from August 1921 and continued to hold the position until 1969 (thought to be a world record in ambulance service). The wives of Superintendents who lived on-site at the residence fulfilled important duties related to the ambulance service, remaining on-call when other members of the brigade were out, answering telephone calls and providing basic first aid when injured people called at the station.

By 1941 calls had begun for a modern ambulance station for Gympie. In 1943 the Brigade Committee investigated building a new station on the Crown Road site, but financial restrictions prevented this from occurring. Subsequently, a building fund was established for a new station and the brigade began looking for suitable sites.

In 1948, the ambulance station measured 36 ft × 48 ft (11 m × 15 m), indicating the rear of the building was extended 18 ft (5.5 m) sometime after 1922. Internally, the building included the plant (front) room and four other rooms - a first aid/casualty room, superintendent's office, staff bedroom and a larger multi-purpose room.

As late as 1954 the brigade were intending to pull down the station building at Crown Rd and erect a new station and living quarters. However, by November 1955, the brigade had acquired land on Nash Street in Gympie's CBD to build the new station and residence and requested the Crown Road reserve be rescinded. While this occurred in December 1955, the brigade remained at the site for another four years. The new Gympie Ambulance Station was opened in 1959, ending 55 years of use of the original station at Crown Road. By this time the Gympie Ambulance service had attended to 11,735 patients and had travelled over 1.85 million kilometres.

Since the removal of the ambulance service in 1959, the station building and house have been used for residential purposes and have been home to the Bowen family since 1987. Over this period some alterations have occurred to the former station building. The front entrance bi-fold doors have been reconstructed. To mark the Gympie Ambulance Service centenary celebrations in 2002, the front awning and finial were reconstructed, replacing the originals that had been removed. In the rooms at the rear of the building, some walls and ceilings have been lined with asbestos cement sheeting. Following a mine capping excavation project in 1992 a besser block understorey was installed beneath the building. On the northern side of the building a window has been replaced by a door and a (temporary) external balcony has been added to the rear. Alterations that have occurred to the former superintendent's residence include room and kitchen reconfiguration and verandah and rear deck extensions. A lean-to has been added to the maintenance shed.

While some changes have occurred, the station building survives as important evidence from the early period of expansion of ambulance services in Queensland. Only two other stations from this period-at Charters Towers (1903) and Ravenswood (1904) (Ravenswood Ambulance Station)-are known to exist.

== Description ==
The former Gympie Ambulance Station complex, including the ambulance station, garage and superintendent's residence, occupies a corner site bound by Crown Road and Stanley Street in a quiet residential area in the south of Gympie. The site slopes away to the west with the ambulance station and residence fronting Crown Road and the maintenance shed down the slope and accessed from Stanley Street.

The ambulance station, a timber-framed and clad building, is sheltered by a gabled roof with a lean-to the south. A large street awning shelters the wide entry doors facing the street. A concrete driveway slightly wider than the front of the building extends to the road crossover. The ambulance station is planned around a large garage space facing Crown Road with smaller scale rooms to the south and rear. A lean-to roofed annex runs along the southern side of the building. The roofs are clad in recent corrugated metal sheeting. Eaves are unlined and eaves gutters are quad-profile.

Wide entry doors consisting of two pairs of hinged ledged doors with strap hinges open out from the main volume to the street which is accessed via a wide driveway. The front opening is sheltered by a timber-framed footpath awning which is supported on timber posts and clad in corrugated metal sheeting. Decorative elements in the main elevation include a circular vent and a simple finial on the gable end. The main building is clad in chamferboards and the lean-to annex to the south is clad in weatherboards.

Multi-paned windows sheltered by recent timber framed window awnings are located along the south elevation. A paneled door opens from the upper level leading out to recent timber framed staircase that run along the side of the building and provide access to the lower level. External walls are clad in weatherboard.

The rear end of the gabled roof is visible on the western elevation where a temporary balcony has recently been constructed. The gable end is clad in chamferboard and features a square vent. Multi-paned windows are also located on this elevation together with a recent timber-framed window awning. The lower level of the building where the land slopes away has recently been enclosed with blockwork. This recent work is not considered to be of heritage significance.

The northern elevation of the ambulance building adjoins the adjacent former ambulance superintendent's residence. This elevation is clad in weatherboards and is linked to the residence with a timber-framed deck platform. A multi-paned double-hung window with a timber-framed awning opens from the main volume internally. A recent entry door and temporary screens have been added. This recent work is not considered to be of heritage significance.

The garage within the ambulance station is a lofty space with the ceiling partly lined on the rake with v-jointed boards laid horizontally. The floor is mostly lined with tongue and groove boards. Two sections underneath where vehicles park is lined with unsealed hardwood shot-edge boards. A large archway frames an opening into the adjacent annex. Quad-profile trims are featured on the ceiling panels and trim the wall junctions. Simple pendant lights hang from the ceiling where a single ventilation inlet in-filled with fretwork is located.

The annex has similar finishes to the main garage room with ceilings lined on the rake with horizontally laid v-jointed boards. Walls are also lined with horizontally laid v-jointed boards. Rooms to the rear of the ambulance building have been lined with asbestos cement sheeting to both walls and ceilings. Ceilings to these rooms are lower and flat. Tongue and groove boards are visible on the floors in some of the rear rooms with some floors lined with carpet and linoleum.

The former maintenance shed is a timber-framed structure with a gabled roof. It is clad in weatherboards and has a corrugated metal roof. A decorative metal roof ventilator is located on the ridge. A small ledged entry door is located on the north elevation and a pair of large ledged doors opens to the street to the south. Three shuttered windows are located on the east elevation while an awning window and a small ledged door is located on the west elevation where a timber- framed lean-to roof has been added. Simple timber finials adorn each gable end. Internally walls and ceilings are unlined and un-painted and the floor is formed from concrete.

The former superintendent's residence is a single-skin, timber-framed cottage sheltered by a pyramid roof clad with corrugated metal sheeting. A decorative roof vent crowns the peak of the roof. Verandahs run to the east and north. A range of work has been undertaken to the building including enclosure of the western part of the north verandah, addition of lattice to the east verandah, insertion of new openings, linings to partitions and verandah ceilings and an extension to the rear. As a consequence, the building contains a mix of new and early fabric. The interior and the rear extension are not considered to be of cultural heritage significance. The significance of this structure is in its presence on Crown Road alongside the ambulance station.

The ambulance complex buildings are located in a lush suburban garden shaded by semi-mature street trees and boundaries are fenced with recent timber pickets.

== Heritage listing ==
The former Gympie Ambulance Station was listed on the Queensland Heritage Register on 16 September 2011 having satisfied the following criteria.

The place is important in demonstrating the evolution or pattern of Queensland's history.

The Gympie Ambulance Station is important in demonstrating the development of ambulance services in Queensland. The establishment of civic ambulance services in regional Queensland centres began in the first decade of the 1900s, a pattern of development that continued during the 20th century. The purpose-built 1904 station building is among the earliest known surviving ambulance stations from this initial phase of establishment. Only two other examples, at Charters Towers (1903) and Ravenswood (1904) (Ravenswood Ambulance Station) are still in existence.

Additions undertaken during the building's use as an ambulance station (1904–1959) including the annex (1922), maintenance shed (1924) and rear extensions (pre-1948) provide important evidence of the evolution of Queensland ambulance services, illustrating the transition from the use of foot travel to motorised transport and growth in demand of the service.

The Gympie Ambulance Station (former) is important in demonstrating the early role of gold mining towns in developing ambulance services in Queensland. Established during the peak years of Gympie's gold production, the station's historical setting, close to large mine headworks and centrally positioned between the centre of town and the One Mile and Monkland areas, illustrates the influence of mining in determining its location.

The place is important in demonstrating the principal characteristics of a particular class of cultural places.

The earliest known surviving timber building of its type, the former Gympie Ambulance Station is important in demonstrating the evolution of the principal characteristics of purpose-built ambulance stations during the twentieth century. The building's provision of large front entrances with ready road access from the plant room to facilitate quick exit and internal rear rooms for staff facilities illustrate the functions of the station.

Additions undertaken during the building's use as an ambulance station (1904–1959), including the annex (1922), maintenance shed (1924) and rear room extensions (pre-1948), and the detached superintendent's residence (1920–21), are important in illustrating the changing requirements of ambulance services over time.
