= The Gympie Miner =

The Gympie Miner was a newspaper published in Gympie, Queensland, Australia. It was also known as The Gympie Miner and One Mile and Monkland Advertiser.

== History ==
The newspaper was published from 1878 to 1899.
