= Old Gympie Post Office =

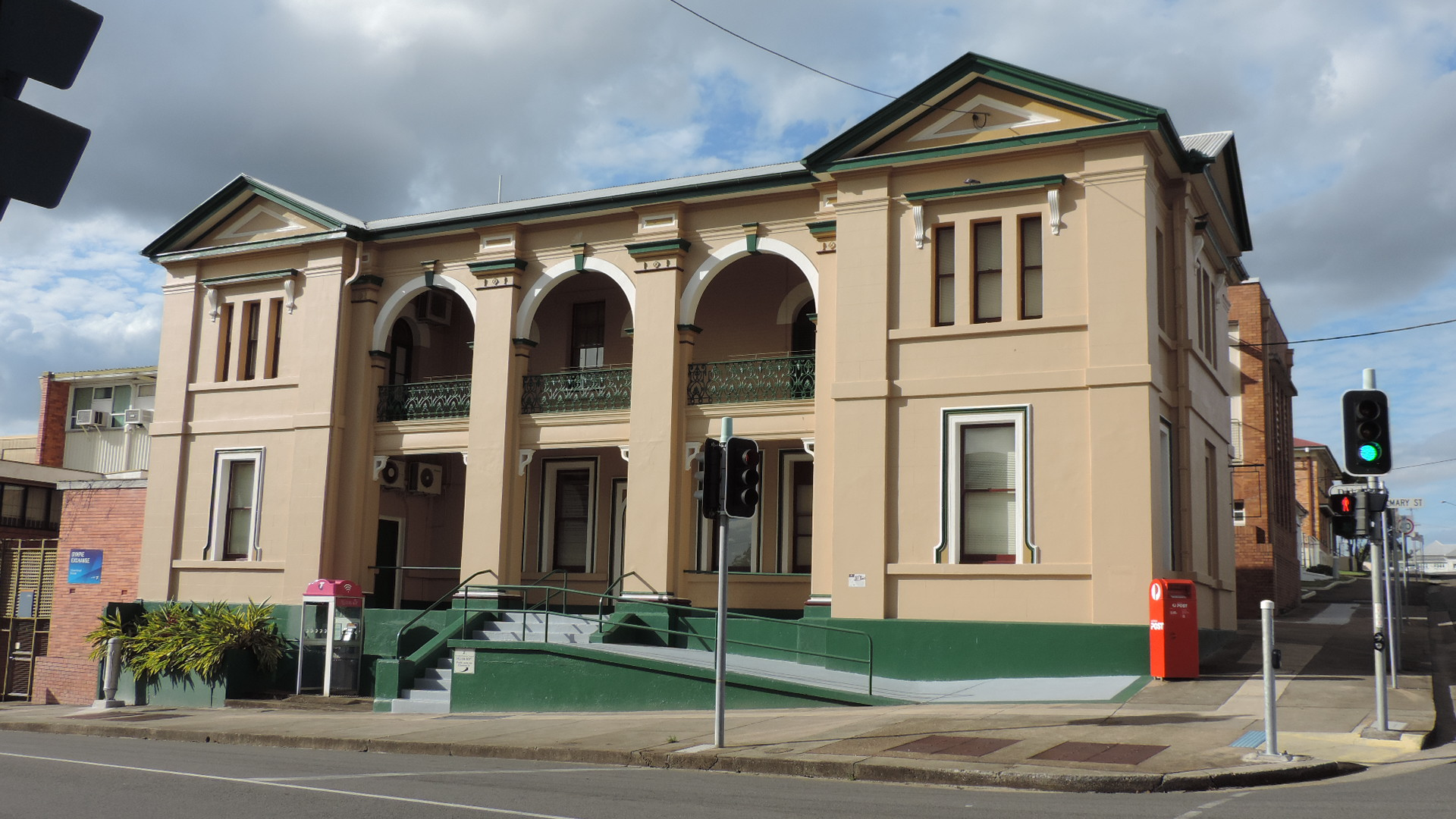
- Old Gympie Post Office, 2015

- Location within Queensland Location within Australia
- 26.1881°S 152.6584°E
- Location: 22 Channon Street, Gympie, Gympie Region, Queensland, Australia

History
- Design period: 1870s–1890s (late 19th century)
- Built: 1878–1880

Site notes
- Architect: Francis Drummond Greville Stanley
- Architectural style: Classicism

Queensland Heritage Register
- Official name: My Country; Old Post Office, Gympie Post Office
- Type: state heritage (built)
- Designated: 21 October 1992
- Reference no.: 600534
- Significant period: 1878–1880, 1898–c. 1901, 1950s (fabric); 1870s–1970s (historical, social)
- Significant components: residential accommodation – post master's house/quarters, post & telegraph office
- Builders: Andrew Collins

The Old Gympie Post Office is a heritage-listed former post office at 22 Channon Street, Gympie, Gympie Region, Queensland, Australia. It was designed by Francis Drummond Greville Stanley and built from 1878 to 1880 by Andrew Collins. It is also known as My Country. It was added to the Queensland Heritage Register on 21 October 1992.

== History ==
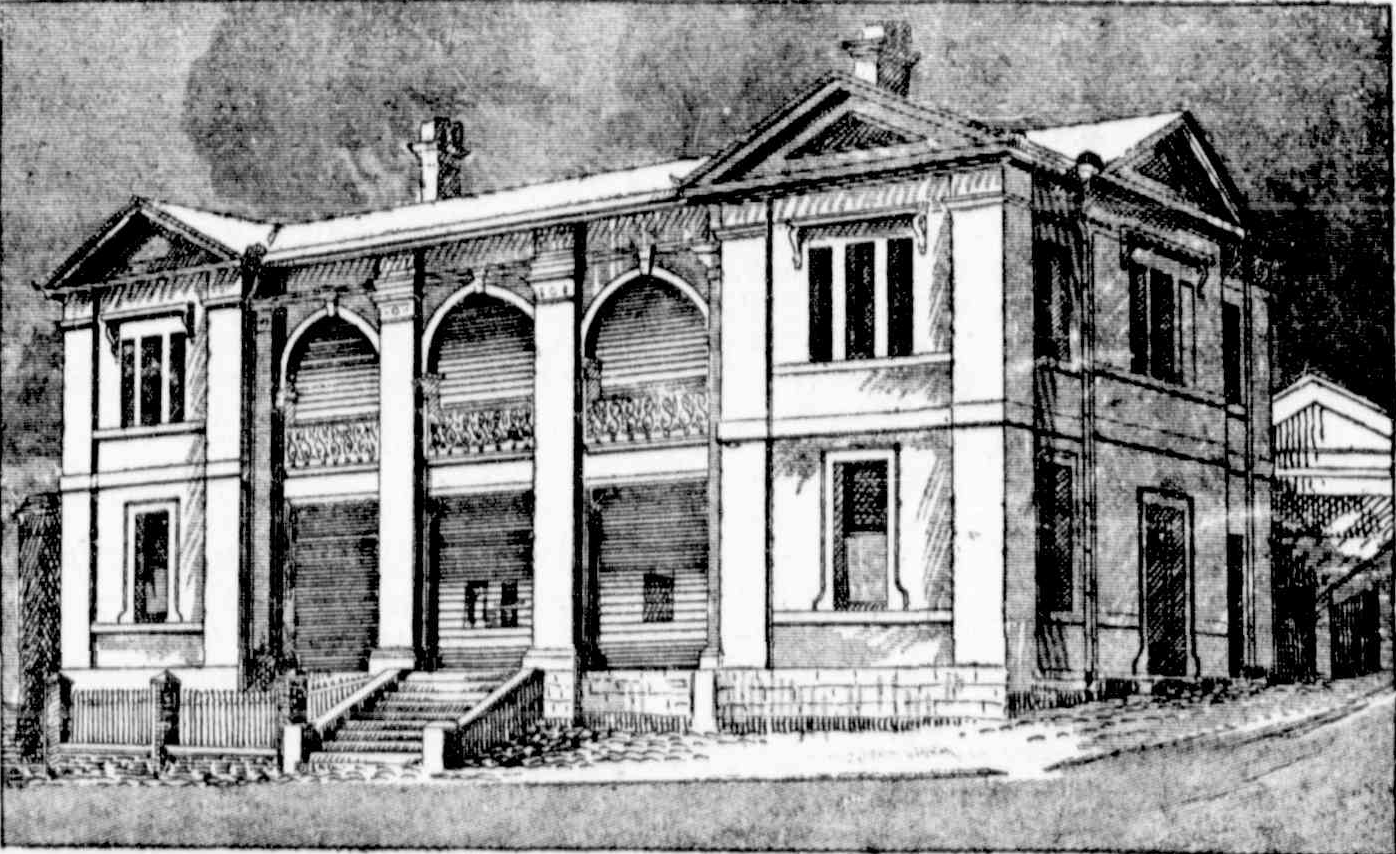
Gympie Post and Telegraph Office, 1891

The Gympie Post Office was erected between 1878 and 1880 and is a substantial two-storeyed masonry structure. It was the third Post Office built in Gympie and was designed by F D G Stanley in his capacity as Queensland Colonial Architect. It is one of eleven similarly designed Post Offices erected throughout Queensland during the period 1878–1898.

Francis Drummond Greville Stanley emigrated to Queensland in 1861 and worked as an architect for the Lands Department before entering private practice. In 1863, he became clerk of works in the Office of the Colonial Architect and was appointed as Superintendent of Roads and Buildings in 1871. When the Roads and Buildings branches divided in 1873, Stanley was appointed Colonial Architect, a position he held until 1881, making him Queensland's longest serving Colonial Architect. He was a prolific worker and designed many buildings throughout the state, including public buildings and those commissioned privately.

Queensland's first post master was appointed in 1842, and the first mail service was established in 1845. By 1859, there were fifteen post offices through Queensland, although some of these were in privately owned buildings. In the 1860s, telegraph stations were established linking most towns to Brisbane and this resulted in many more telegraph offices than post offices being established. The two bodies amalgamated in 1879 and continued to be operated by the Queensland Government until Federation in 1901 when they came under the control of the Federal Government.

The town of Gympie was established after the discovery of gold in the area by James Nash in 1867. At this stage, the new colony of Queensland was in dire financial trouble, and a reward was offered to anyone who discovered gold. Nash received the reward of £3,000 and the rush to the Gympie gold field began. By 1869, the town now known as Gympie had a population of many thousands. It was established so rapidly that by the time the official surveyors arrived in 1868, a substantial amount of the town had already been laid out. This resulted in the town being laid out in an irregular pattern, following the topography of the land and the mining sites, rather than the orthogonal grid pattern familiar to most Queensland towns.

In 1867, Post Master General, Thomas Murray-Prior reported to Parliament that complaints were being received concerning the lack of [postal] facilities at Gympie. It was decided to establish a postal service and in 1867, E H Booth took up service as Gympie's first post master. An auctioneer and estate agent, Booth was not officially appointed, but was classed as an allowance officer, indicating that the demand was not great enough to necessitate the appointment of a full-time post master. Booth ran the post office from a shop in Mary Street, and the service rapidly expanded in the first two years.

In 1868, an official postmaster was appointed, making the evolution of the postal service from part-time to an official service the most rapid in the history of the colony. The new service opened in Gympie's second post office building. However the gold rush continued to bring an influx of people to Gympie and the postal service developed accordingly, rendering the second post office building inadequate in a very short time.

A portion of land was set aside for a new post office on the corner of Duke and Channon Streets on what was then known as Commissioner's Hill. Due to its remoteness from the centre of the town, this location received strong protest from the residents of Gympie and a petition of five hundred signatures was sent to the Minister of Works. However, this was ignored by the Government and the erection of the new Post Office proceeded on the reserved site. Tenders for the new building were called on May 9, 1878 and two were received. Both were beyond the expected cost and negotiations were made with the lowest tenderer, Andrew Collins. This included the reduction of the length of the building from 96 to 76 feet (29 to 23 m). The contract was signed on August 23, 1878, however, the building was not completed in the specified time due to bad weather and a lack of skilled labour.

The building was finally completed in 1880 and included space for the post office, the land commissioner, the telegraph office and accommodation for the post master and his family. The building was arranged with space downstairs for the post and telegraph offices, each with separate entrances from the verandah. The land commissioner was located at the Channon Street end of the building on the ground and first floors, with access from Channon Street. The remaining space was used by the post master as his residence and included most of the first floor and a ground level sitting room at the rear of the main building. An additional kitchen and bedroom were located in a separate wing at the rear of the main building.

In 1898, after the land commissioner was relocated, tenders were called for alterations and additions to the post office. These included the removal of the stair at the Channon Street end of the building, an additional room at the rear of the building and the alteration of the first-level land commissioner's office to an additional bedroom and sitting room. These alterations necessitated the re-arrangement of window and door openings. The building underwent further alterations, including those in 1901, when the telephone exchange opened, and those in 1954 when the post master's residence was transformed into a new telephone trunk exchange.

In 1964, the new Automatic Telephone Exchange building was opened, adjoining and linked to the original Post Office building. This ensured that Gympie was equipped with one of the most modern services in Australia.

Both the post office and telephone exchange continued to expand, until the building was no longer considered adequate. On 14 November 1975, the new post office in Mary Street was opened, and the old one closed and purchased by Telecom. The building was subsequently handed over to the Gympie City Council in 1994.

In February 2019, a local firm Corbet Johns Builders purchased the building with the intention to restore it and use it as their office.

== Description ==
The Gympie Post Office is located at the intersection of Channon and Duke Streets and is a substantial two-storeyed masonry building. It is a dominant landmark in the streetscape and together with the Lands Office, Police Station and Court House, forms a precinct of Government buildings.

The front elevation facing Duke Street is symmetrically composed and comprises a central section with arched colonnades on the ground and upper levels, flanked by infilled sections on either end. The central section comprises three openings which extend the two levels of the building. These are arched above the first floor and intersected at midpoint by the first floor verandah. Between each arch are engaged pilasters with substantially moulded capitals. Other decorative features include keystones at the centre of each arch, small brackets below the first floor verandah and cast iron balustrading. The end sections are also symmetrical in design, with a single window at ground level and a group of three windows at first floor level. Each end section is capped with a triangular pediment and string courses run at floor level between the ground and first floors.

The elevation facing Duke Street is a continuation of the design of the end sections, with a slightly projecting central bay capped with a triangular pediment. A secondary entrance is located at the northern end of this elevation.

Internally, much of the partitioning from the building's use as a post office has been removed, resulting in an open space on the ground level. Three octagonal timber posts supporting the first floor divide the space, and staircases with decorative timber balustrades are located in each corner at the rear of the building. The stair at the eastern end of the building is a reproduction based on the existing stair at the opposite end. Most joinery remains intact, apart from the skirtings which have been replaced.

The first floor comprises a corridor which runs between the staircases at the rear of the building and offices divided by new partitioning at the front. All offices open onto the verandah and a new bathroom is located at the western end of the building.

== Heritage listing ==
The Old Gympie Post Office was listed on the Queensland Heritage Register on 21 October 1992 having satisfied the following criteria.

The place is important in demonstrating the evolution or pattern of Queensland's history.

Completed in 1880, the Gympie Post Office is the third Post Office in Gympie, demonstrating the growth of the town, as well as the growth of Government infrastructure throughout Queensland. As such, the Gympie Post Office is important in demonstrating the evolution of Queensland's history.

The place is important in demonstrating the principal characteristics of a particular class of cultural places.

The Post Office demonstrates the principal characteristics of a building of its type. It is a substantial two-storeyed masonry building with Classical detailing and is typical of Government designed buildings of the period.

The place is important because of its aesthetic significance.

It is of aesthetic significance both for its landmark qualities and its contribution to the streetscape. Together with the Lands Office, the Police Station and the Court House, it forms a precinct of Government buildings. It is also of aesthetic significance for its design qualities and detailing including cast iron balustrading and internal joinery elements.

The place has a special association with the life or work of a particular person, group or organisation of importance in Queensland's history.

The Gympie Post Office has association with Queensland architect, F D G Stanley, as one of the last examples of his work in the position of Colonial Architect.
