= Royal Bank of Queensland, Gympie =

Royal Bank of Queensland
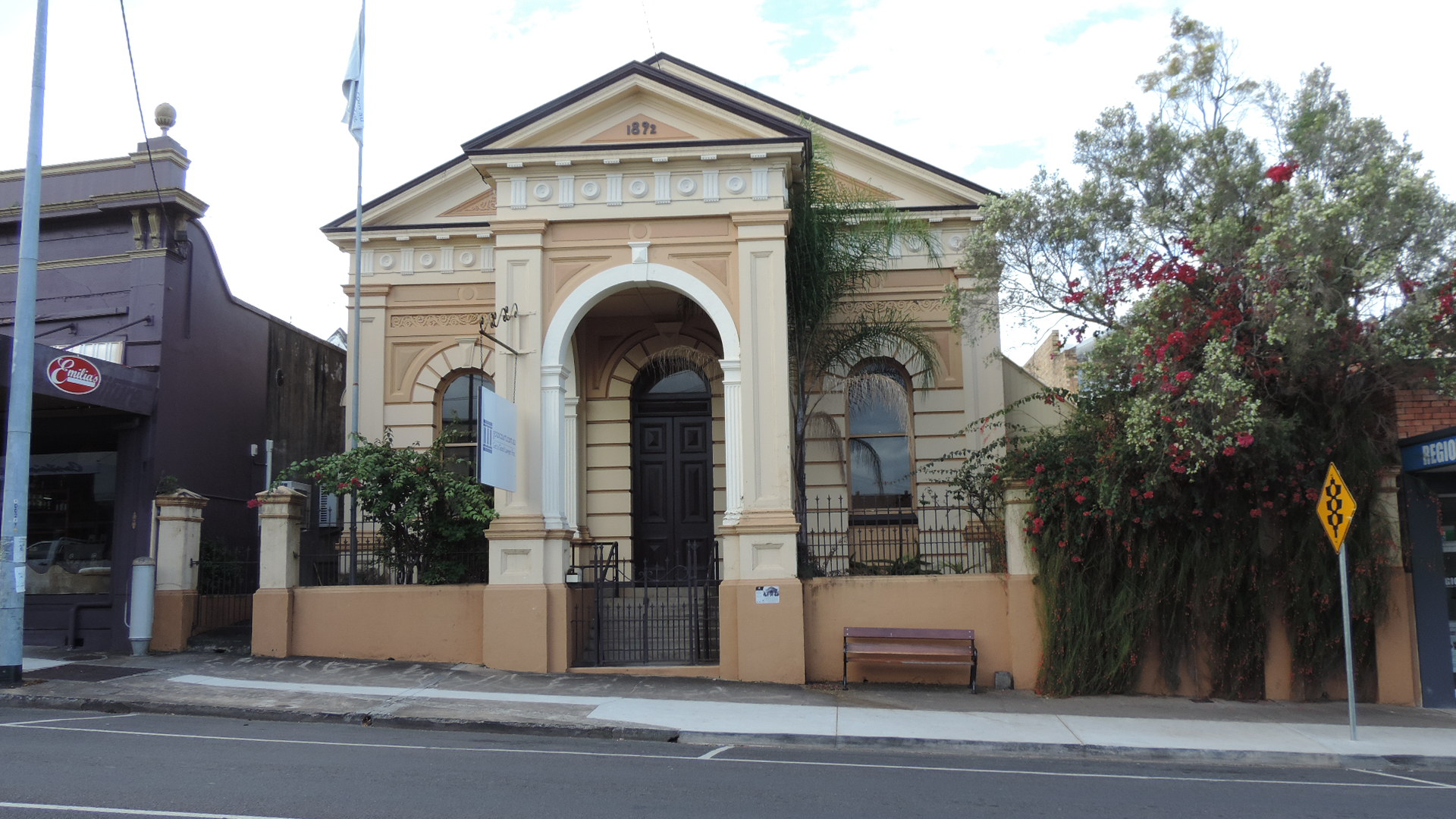
- Former Royal Bank of Queensland, 2015

- Location within Queensland Location within Australia
- 26.1889°S 152.66°E
- Location: 199 Mary Street, Gympie, Gympie Region, Queensland, Australia

History
- Design period: 1870s–1890s (late 19th century)
- Built: 1892

Site notes
- Architect: Hugo Durietz
- Architectural style: Classicism

Queensland Heritage Register
- Official name: Royal Bank of Queensland (former)
- Type: state heritage (built)
- Designated: 15 April 2011
- Reference no.: 602774
- Significant period: 1892–1979
- Significant components: bank

Royal Bank of Queensland is a heritage-listed former bank at 199 Mary Street, Gympie, Gympie Region, Queensland, Australia. It was designed by Hugo Durietz and built in 1892. It was added to the Queensland Heritage Register on 15 April 2011.

== History ==
The former Royal Bank of Queensland building at Gympie, located at 199 Mary Street, was designed by architect Hugh Durietz in 1891 and built in 1892. This neoclassical building served as the Gympie branch of successive banks for 87 years, firstly as Royal Bank of Queensland from 1892 and finally as the National Australia Bank to 1979.

Gympie (initially known as Nashville) was established after the discovery of gold in the Mary River district in October 1867. The new goldfield turned Queensland into a significant gold producer and contributed much needed finances to the young colony. Thousands of people arrived at the Gympie goldfield in the months after the discovery and a fledgling settlement emerged. In a year the alluvial gold had been exhausted and shallow reef mining commenced.

As Gympie evolved from a hastily established mining settlement, the early makeshift structures of the 1860s gradually gave way to more permanent and substantial public and private buildings from the mid-1870s. With the change to deep reef mining from 1875, came the need for extensive capital investment through the formation of companies using foreign capital. During 1881, mines began yielding large amounts of gold, marking a new era of wealth and prosperity for Gympie as an intensive phase of underground reef mining began, facilitated by the injection of capital into mining companies for machinery and employees.

Mainly due to Queensland's three major gold mining centres – Gympie, Charters Towers and Mount Morgan – gold production contributed between 21.61 and 35.53 percent of Queensland's export income during the 1880s and 1890s. The value of gold output rose from £698,000 in 1883 to £2.75 million in 1889, exceeding the value of exported wool. These enormous amounts of gold were purchased by banks such as the Royal Bank, which played a vital role in this process of wealth creation and distribution.

The influx of money and the resultant yield of gold at Gympie were reflected in the redevelopment of upper Mary Street during the 1880s and 1890s with substantial commercial buildings such as banks and company secretary and brokers' offices. Several fires - in 1877, 1881 and 1891 - razed the earlier timber buildings in upper Mary Street and accelerated this transformation. A fire in January 1891 destroyed all of the buildings between the Gympie Times offices and the Mining Exchange Hotel which lead to the construction of more permanent masonry buildings on the eastern side of upper Mary Street. The last of the new buildings erected was the Royal Bank of Queensland, located adjacent to the Gympie Times office.

Designed by Hugh Durietz in 1891, tenders were invited for the erection of the bank premises in December 1891; closing on 24 December. The bank was completed in 1892.

Hugo Durietz (1831–1908) dominated Gympie architecture and its society. He was reported as having trained as an architect in Sweden before migrating to Victoria in 1852, attracted by its gold discoveries. He came to Queensland as part of the Canoona gold rush in 1858 but by 1862 had commenced business as a builder in Brisbane. He was contracted to build the Bank of New South Wales building on the corner of Queen and George Streets in Brisbane (subsequently replaced by the present building), supervised by James Cowlishaw, in 1864–65. In 1866 he was elected as an alderman for Kangaroo Point in the Brisbane Town Council but was bankrupted during the 1867 depression. After finalisation of his insolvency case in December 1867 he joined the rush to the Gympie goldfield where he became involved in many innovative business enterprises and joined community committees including those of the School of Arts; hospital; Mutual Improvement Association; Agricultural, Mining and Pastoral Society; and the Gympie Primary School. He is also attributed with introducing the mechanical cream separator to Queensland, a vital factor in the growth of the Queensland dairy industry.

By 1871 Durietz had begun his practise as an architect in Gympie and for more than 30 years he was commissioned by institutions on whose committees he served, many religious denominations and by business leaders and professionals, often on an ongoing basis. He tendered for 113 buildings during his career; projects ranging from numerous hotels, shops and cottages to public buildings in Gympie like the Surface Hill Wesleyan Church, the Gympie School of Arts and the Royal Bank building.

The Royal Bank of Queensland, established in 1885 by local investors who were finding it hard to obtain loans from sources outside Queensland, was intended as an alternative to its rival the Queensland National Bank. It was one of only three Queensland-based banks established during the 19th century. The head office opened in Brisbane in February 1886 and although it established three branches in the mining towns of Gympie, Charters Towers and Croydon, it generally avoided mining towns because they were too risky. Instead the Royal Bank concentrated on mercantile and agricultural interests near the coast, opening branches in sound agricultural districts and ports. By 1889 it had 20 branches and agencies including branches in London and Edinburgh. In 1890 the Royal Bank occupied fifth place amongst the ten banks trading in Queensland. The Royal Bank, in contrast to the Queensland National Bank, generally contented itself with timber and iron premises rather than occupying extravagant masonry buildings in the larger towns; established a more cautious lending policy instead of erratic lending due to fluctuating government deposits; and was the bank of humbler men rather than of the elite.

Initially the Royal Bank had followed a cautious banking policy acquiring £1 million in deposits by the end of 1888. This forced the bank to increasingly lend to people and industries that could not easily repay on demand, thereby following the custom of Queensland banking. Subsequently, in May 1893 the Royal Bank became one of the many banks that temporarily ceased trading at the height of the 1893 banking crisis in Queensland. By the end of May a reconstruction scheme for the Royal Bank had been announced and in early August 1893 the bank re-opened for trading.

The 20th century brought a series of mergers for the Royal Bank of Queensland. In 1917 the bank merged with the Bank of North Queensland, which had opened in Townsville in 1888, to become the Bank of Queensland. In 1922 this bank was absorbed by the National Bank of Australasia. Following the amalgamation of the Queensland National Bank with the National Bank of Australasia to form the National Bank of Australia in 1948 there were two branches of the bank in Gympie - at 33 and 199 Mary Street.

In January 1980 the National Bank amalgamated its branches at 33 Mary Street and 199 Mary Street to form a single bank of the National Bank in Gympie at 33 Mary Street, ending 87 years of banking at 199 Mary Street. The former Royal Bank of Queensland building was auctioned in March of the same year and became commercial premises.

Alterations to the bank have included the enclosure of most of the rear verandah and some of the side verandah, the addition of partition walls to form an office in the centre of the public space and removal of the banking counter. Doorways in two interior walls have been altered. A ramp has been added on the left hand side from Mary Street to the main entrance. Roofing iron has been replaced on the main roof and the rear and side verandahs.

The former Royal Bank building before 2011 was the headquarters of the Gympie Muster.

== Description ==
The former Royal Bank of Queensland is an imposing single-storey rendered masonry building with a pedimented temple front standing prominently to upper Mary Street in Gympie's central business area.

The rendered masonry front fence forms a plinth to the building which is set back from the property boundary and raised above street level. The compact front elevation is dominated by a projecting pedimented portico which is framed by fluted corner pilasters and shelters a set of concrete stairs and a landing. The plain moulded pediments of the front elevation and portico rest on decorative entablature friezes. The portico pediment has 1892 inscribed within. The front elevation is defined by fluted corner pilasters and composed of three arched openings notable for their severe rendered rusticated surrounds. The central arched entrance accommodates a narrow draft lobby which projects into the banking chamber. The lobby is lined with timber panelling and houses two sets of doors, the outer a set of solid timber panelled doors and the inner a set glazed timber doors. The flanking arched openings house timber framed double hung sash windows with masonry sills.

Garden beds sit behind the front fence separating the building from the footpath. Decorative wrought iron balustrading runs between the fence posts and a decorative wrought iron gate opens to the entry steps. A recent concrete ramp to the western end is accessed from the street through a later opening in the front fence.

The building is sheltered by a gabled roof hidden from view behind the pediment. The roof is timber-framed and clad with corrugated metal sheeting and rests within parapet walls on all four sides. Box gutters drain to two rainwater heads at each end of the northern elevation. A masonry chimney with moulded cornice rises through the roof on the eastern side of the building.

Exterior walls to the remainder of the building are rendered and finished with shallow ruled ashlar. The western elevation is punctuated by four large double-hung sash windows shaded by curved timber-framed window hoods. Verandahs wrap around the east and north. The south end of the east verandah is open and stop chamfered posts with capitals are supported on recent metal stirrups and bearers are supported on low masonry piers. The verandah roof is timber-framed and the floor is lined with wide hardwood boards. Two door openings to the east verandah flank a large double-hung timber sash window. At the south end, a timber paneled door with glazed fanlight opens into the manager's office and the northern opening houses glazed French windows which open into the vestibule to the rear of the manager's office.

The remainder of the verandahs is enclosed with concrete blockwork. The parapet wall on the northern elevation rises to follow the gabled roof shape and is capped with a simple masonry mould. Early security bars remain in place on all external openings.

The interior is organized around the banking chamber which is accessed directly from the main entrance. The manager's office opens to the right of the chamber and two smaller offices and the bank vault run along the rear. A side entrance from the east verandah opens into a vestibule to the rear of the manager's office providing discreet access to this office and to the rear of the chamber. The banking chamber has additional later partitioning that is not full height. Two decorative timber rails run at half height around the chamber. An early fireplace, located in the manager's office, is framed with a simple timber mantelpiece and has a cast iron grate and side cheeks with a masonry hearth.

The interiors generally are notable for early cedar joinery and early door and window hardware including door knobs, locks, drop bolts, porcelain finger plates and key plates, and brass door handles to inner entrance doors. There is a gaslight fitting to the left of the vault opening.

Internal openings are generous in height and house fine timber-paneled doors with tall glazed pivoting fanlights. Generous moulded plaster skirting boards and timber skirting blocks and architraves are intact throughout. All interior timber work and joinery is varnished. Walls and ceilings are lined with hardset plaster with deep moulded cornices. A single decorative plaster ceiling rose is located in the banking chamber. Floors are generally covered with recent carpet.

The early bank vault remains intact and is secured by a heavy, metal plated door with early door furnishings intact. The vault is formed with arched brickwork supported on thick brickwork walls which have a thin render finish and has metal rod cross bracing.

The site rises sharply to the north, registering Gympie's hilly landscape. A concrete retaining wall stands to the rear of the building within which concrete steps rise steeply to a flat grassed platform which accommodates a small blockwork shed which is not considered to be of cultural heritage significance. An early concrete surface drain is located on the eastern side of the building.

== Heritage listing ==
The former Royal Bank of Queensland was listed on the Queensland Heritage Register on 15 April 2011 having satisfied the following criteria.

The place is important in demonstrating the evolution or pattern of Queensland's history.

The former Royal Bank of Queensland (Royal Bank) building (1892)-and the important gold-era precinct of which it is a part-is physical evidence of the evolution of gold mining at Gympie, a major contributor to the wealth of Queensland for approximately 60 years from 1867. As Gympie gold production continued and evolved from alluvial to shallow reef mining to deep reef mining from 1875, this change was reflected in the erection of more permanent and elaborate buildings in the town centre. The Royal Bank, built during the third stage of Gympie mining, symbolised the wealth and permanence of the town.

The former Royal Bank building is important in demonstrating the vital role of financial institutions in the process of wealth creation and distribution on Queensland goldfields as it converted enormous amounts of gold into cash.

The longest serving of all the Gympie bank buildings, the Royal Bank building functioned as a bank branch from 1892 to 1979.

The place is important in demonstrating the principal characteristics of a particular class of cultural places.

The former Royal Bank of Queensland building is important in demonstrating the principal characteristics of a regional bank of its era, being a good example of a masonry structure in a classical style combining a banking chamber and offices.

Its siting with other gold-related buildings in upper Mary Street above the gold diggings, illustrates the prominence of banks in the gold mining town of Gympie. Its intactness is demonstrated on its exterior and in its room volumes, joinery and fittings and extant strongroom.

The place is important because of its aesthetic significance.

The former Royal Bank building has aesthetic significance for its architectural qualities expressed in the craftsmanship and detailing of the joinery and finishes, and for its streetscape value through its form, scale and design. These qualities complement other surviving 19th century buildings in the street, particularly other banks also entered in the Queensland Heritage Register including the nearby former Bank of New South Wales.

Its balanced classical design, often associated with banks, projects the concept of stability that financial institutions of this era sought to convey through their buildings' architecture.

Set back from the property boundary and with a prominent portico addressing the Mary Street frontage, the former Royal Bank has a striking appearance, giving it enormous streetscape presence among the upper Mary Street gold-era buildings. This important and substantially intact gold-era precinct comprises a harmonious streetscape of late Victorian commercial buildings dating from the 1880s and 1890s.

The place has a special association with the life or work of a particular person, group or organisation of importance in Queensland's history.

The former Royal Bank building is a fine example of the work of architect Hugo Durietz who dominated Gympie architecture between 1871 and at least 1902 and was a highly regarded community leader. Other extant significant buildings designed by Durietz, include the Surface Hill Wesleyan Church, School of Arts, the organ loft of the St Patricks Church and the upper floor and facade of the Crawford & Co Building at 216 Mary Street, Gympie.
