= National bank =

National bank may refer to:

== Types of bank ==
- a central bank, in many countries' contemporary usage
- National bank (United States), a bank operating within the federal government's regulatory structure, including a list of U.S. banks with "National Bank" in their name
- National Banks in Meiji Japan, a system of organization of the Japanese banking system created in the 1870s

== Central banks ==
- National Bank of the Republic of Abkhazia
- National Bank of Angola
- National Bank of the Republic of Belarus
- National Bank of Belgium
- Bulgarian National Bank
- National Bank of Cambodia
- Croatian National Bank
- Czech National Bank
- Danmarks Nationalbank
- National Bank of Ethiopia
- National Bank of Georgia
- Hungarian National Bank
- National Bank of Kazakhstan
- National Bank of the Kyrgyz Republic
- National Bank of Liechtenstein
- National Bank of Moldova
- National Bank of North Macedonia
- National Bank of Poland
- National Bank of Romania
- National Bank of Rwanda
- National Bank of Serbia
- National Bank of Slovakia
- Swiss National Bank
- National Bank of Tajikistan
- National Bank of Ukraine

== Former central banks ==
- National Bank of Czechoslovakia
- National Bank of Haiti
- Privileged National Bank of the Kingdom of Serbia
- National Bank of Yugoslavia
- National Bank of Yugoslavia in Serbia and Montenegro

== Commercial banks ==
- National Australia Bank
- Queensland National Bank in Australia
- National Bank of Australasia in Australia
- National Bank of Bahrain
- National Bank Limited in Bangladesh
- National Bank of Canada
- National Bank of Egypt
- Nationalbank für Deutschland, a defunct German bank
- National-Bank in Germany
- First National Bank Ghana
- National Bank of Greece
- Punjab National Bank in India
- National Bank of Kenya
- National Bank of Kuwait
- First National Bank (Lebanon)
- National Bank of New Zealand
- National Bank of Pakistan, a multinational commercial bank that is a subsidiary of the country's central bank, the State Bank of Pakistan
- The National Bank (Palestine)
- Philippine National Bank
- Saudi National Bank
- First National Bank (South Africa)
- Hatton National Bank in Sri Lanka
- National Bank of Commerce (Tanzania)
- National Bank of Abu Dhabi, UAE
- National Bank of Dubai, UAE
- National Bank Ltd in the United Kingdom
- National Bank of Scotland, merged in 1969 with Royal Bank of Scotland
- National Bank of Uzbekistan

== Other uses ==
- The National Bank (band), a Norwegian rock band
- National Bank for Agriculture and Rural Development, a regulatory body in India

== See also ==
- National Bank Act (U.S. law)
- National Bank Building in Johannesburg
- Banque Nationale (disambiguation)
- Nationalbank (disambiguation)
- State bank (disambiguation)
- Royal Bank (disambiguation)
