= Royal Bank =

Royal Bank may refer to:

- Royal Bank (Azerbaijan)
- Royal Bank of Canada
  - Royal Bank Plaza, headquarters of Royal Bank of Canada in Toronto, Ontario, Canada
- Royal Bank of Queensland, a former bank in Australia
  - Royal Bank of Queensland, Maryborough
- Royal Bank of Scotland
- Royal Bank of Trinidad and Tobago, a subsidiary of RBC
- Royal British Bank
- Royal Canadian Bank
- Royal Trust Tower, former headquarters of Royal Trustco
- The Royal Bank, Ghana
- Banco Real, the Royal Bank of Brazil, a subsidiary of ABN AMRO
- Banque Royale, the name taken by the Banque Générale of John Law when it was acquired by the French state in 1718

== See also ==
- Royal Bank Building (disambiguation)
- Royal Trust (disambiguation)
- National bank (disambiguation)
- List of central banks
- Central bank
