= Bank of Queensland (1863–1866) =

Australian (trading) bank

The Bank of Queensland was a bank in Queensland, Australia. Established in London it opened for business in Brisbane on 13 August 1863 in the renovated premises of the former Joint Stock Bank. There had been just four (trading) banks established in Queensland by late 1862 but all from other Australian colonies, branches of New South Wales Bank, Union Bank of Australia, Australian Joint Stock Bank and the Bank of Australasia.

Branches of the Bank of Queensland were shortly opened at Ipswich, Dalby and Rockhampton as well as at Toowoomba and elsewhere.

In the midst of the July 1866 collapse of the major London discount house Overend, Gurney and Company the London board of the Bank of Queensland took the opportunity to announce that a major portion of their bank's capital had been lost by poorly chosen advances made on securities of sheep and cattle stations, (Note: The London directors seemed to fail to understand the advances were on livestock and wool to be sold in England but it might have been a shield for Queensland's Colonial Treasurer) sawmills and even newspaper proprietors. The bank suspended payments a week later.

In the following days it became known that the immediate reason for the suspension of payments was the Queensland's Government's failure to honour its cheques and that happened because the Agra and Masterman's Bank had failed, following Overend, Gurney. The panic in London also brought an Australian run on the Bank of Queensland and at the end of 1866 the shareholders agreed to voluntarily wind the bank up.

== Other trading banks named Bank of Queensland ==
1917–1922

A new Bank of Queensland was created by the January 1917 merger of the Royal Bank of Queensland with the Bank of North Queensland. It was bought by the National Bank in 1922.

1970—

The Bank of Queensland's name has since been taken by the Brisbane Permanent Benefit Building and Investment Society, Queensland's first permanent building society founded in 1874 and incorporated in 1887 when it began operations as a savings bank.

Licensed as a trading bank in 1942 it took on the name Bank of Queensland in 1970.
