= Royal Bank of Queensland, Lowood =

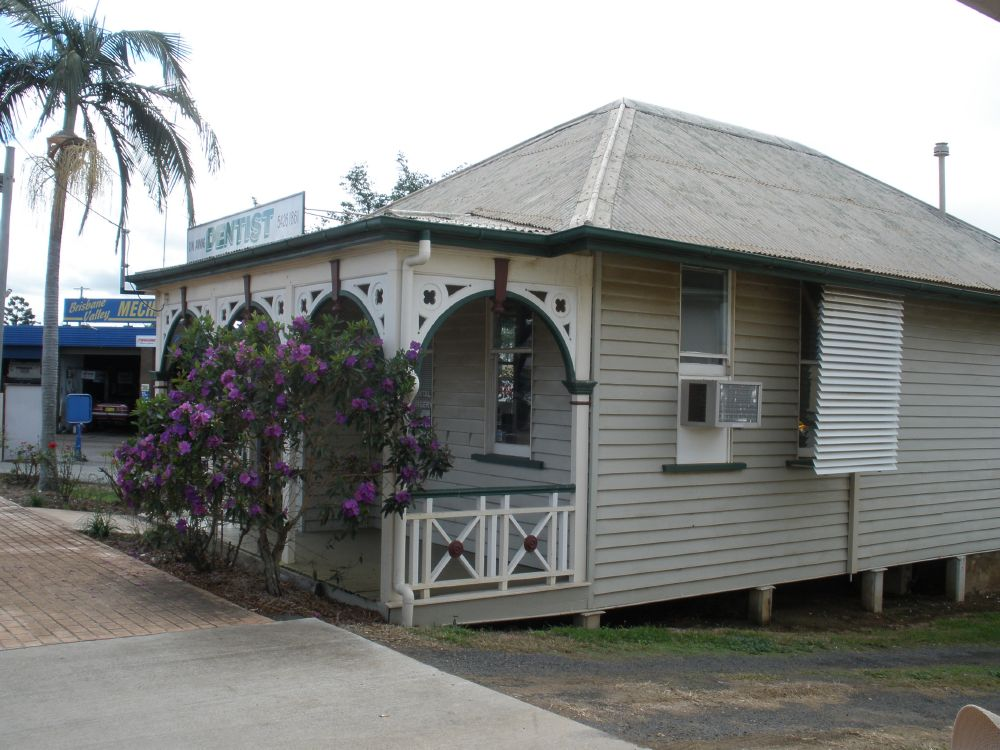
- Former Royal Bank of Queensland, 2009

- Location within Queensland Location within Australia
- 27.4618°S 152.5814°E
- Location: 12 Railway Street, Lowood, Somerset Region, Queensland, Australia

History
- Design period: 1900–1914 (early 20th century)
- Built: 1901–1917

Queensland Heritage Register
- Official name: Dental Surgery, Bank of Queensland Ltd, National Bank of Australasia, Royal Bank of Queensland Ltd
- Type: state heritage (built)
- Designated: 21 October 1992
- Reference no.: 600496
- Significant period: 1900s–1910s (fabric); 1901–1986 (historical use)
- Significant components: strong room, toilet block/earth closet/water closet, shed/s

The Royal Bank of Queensland is a heritage-listed former bank at 12 Railway Street, Lowood, Somerset Region, Queensland, Australia. It was built from 1901 to 1917. It is also known as Bank of Queensland Ltd, National Bank of Australasia, and now as a dental surgery. It was added to the Queensland Heritage Register on 21 October 1992.

== History ==
This small timber building was erected in Main Street, Lowood, between 1901 and 1917, as a branch of the Royal Bank of Queensland Ltd.

Lowood had emerged as the centre of a thriving farming district after the rail link to Ipswich was opened in mid-1884. In 1901 the Royal Bank, established in Brisbane in 1885 as a competitor to the Queensland National Bank, opened a branch at Lowood. For the first two decades of the 20th century it remained the only banking establishment in the town.

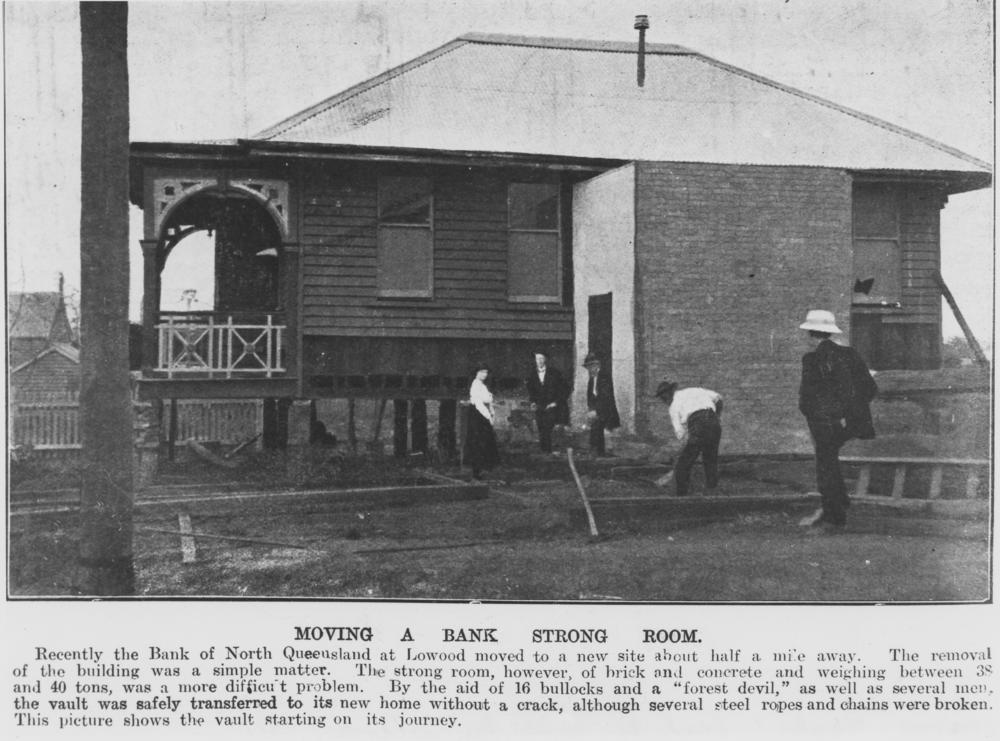
Relocating the bank, 1917

In January 1917 the Royal Bank and the Bank of North Queensland (established in Townsville in 1888) merged to form the Bank of Queensland Ltd, with the Lowood branch retained under the new name. In mid-1917 the Lowood bank building, complete with a brick and concrete strongroom which weighed close to 40 tonnes, was re-located to the present site in Railway Street.

In 1922 the Bank of Queensland in turn merged with the National Bank of Australasia, and the building remained a branch of the National Bank until 1986. In 2015, it functions as a dental surgery.

== Description ==
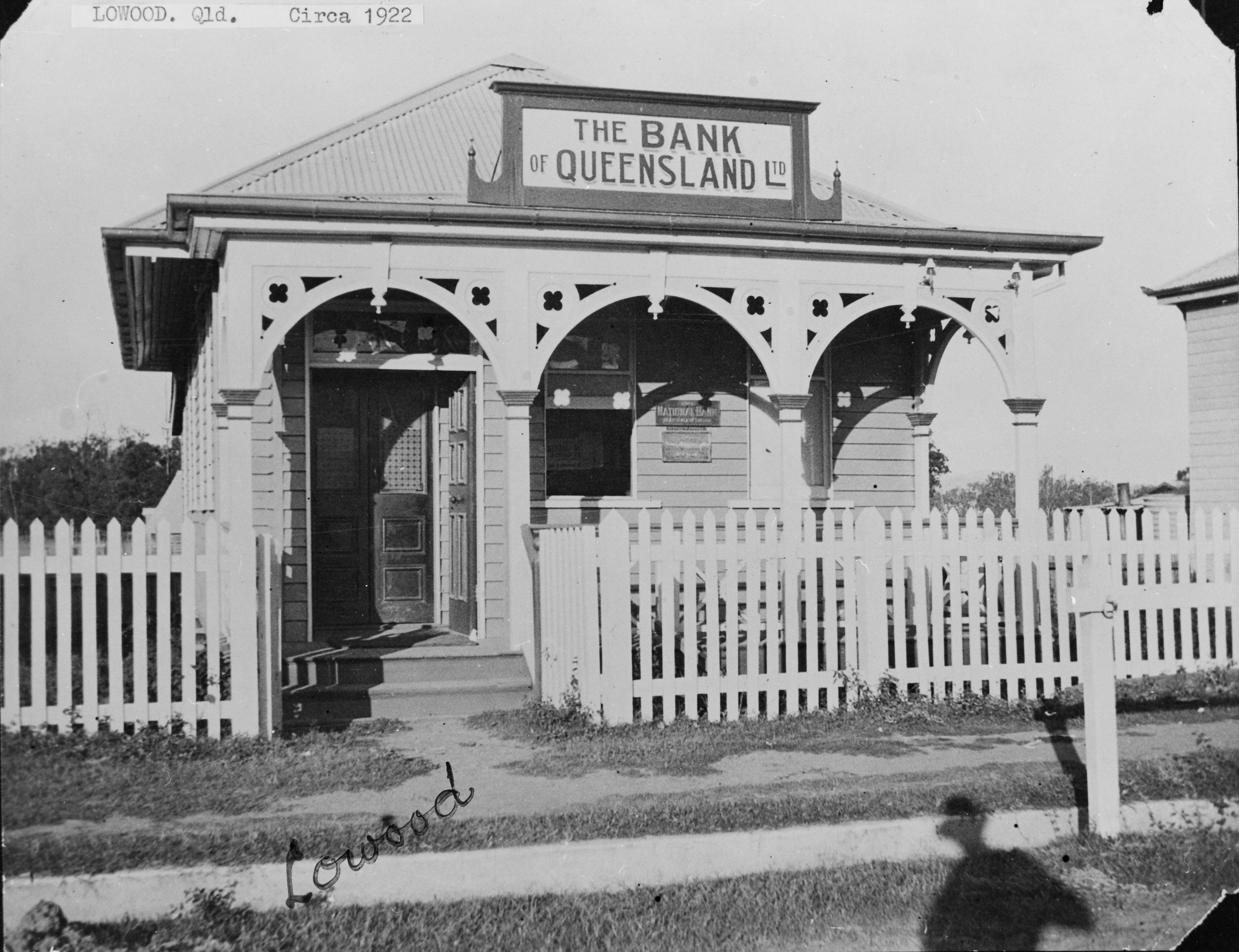
Bank of Queensland in Lowood, 1922

This single-storied weatherboard building fronts Railway Street in the centre of Lowood. Rectangular in plan, the building has a corrugated iron hipped roof with a shallow hip to the front verandah and a skillion to the rear office and workroom. The building sits on concrete stumps with the verandah at street level and the land sloping away to the rear.

The verandah has decorative carved timber arch brackets with corner quatrefoil design and cross-braced balustrade with a circular pattern. The ceiling is lined and a projecting vestibule has twin timber doors with a fanlight above.

The interior has tongue and groove boards to the walls, a flat boarded ceiling and partitioning has been installed to separate the surgery, reception and a toilet. The building has double-hung sash windows and a rendered masonry strongroom is built into the southeast elevation adjacent to the surgery and is used as a store.

A metal sheeted shed sitting on metal posts and a weatherboard and fibrous cement toilet block are located to the rear of the building. Metal sunshades are attached to the northwest and southeast elevations.

== Heritage listing ==
The former Royal Bank of Queensland at Lowood was listed on the Queensland Heritage Register on 21 October 1992 having satisfied the following criteria.

The former Royal Bank of Queensland Ltd building at Lowood is important in demonstrating the pattern of Queensland's history, being associated with the rural expansion of the Royal Bank of Queensland in the late 19th and early 20th centuries.

It is important in demonstrating some of the principal characteristics of a small, early 20th century, timber bank building in rural Queensland, retaining a substantially intact exterior and what appears to be the original masonry strongroom.

It exhibits aesthetic characteristics valued by the local community, in particular the streetscape contribution of its decorative timber facade.
