= Virgin Money Australia =

Financial services company

Virgin Money (Australia) Pty Ltd
- Type: Private (Limited liability)
- Founded: 2003
- Founder: Virgin Group; Macquarie Bank
- Area served: Australia
- Services: Finance; Banking
- Owner: Bank of Queensland
- Website: www.virginmoney.com.au

Virgin Money Australia is an Australian financial services company owned by Bank of Queensland, and has 150,000 customers.

== History ==
=== Foundation ===
In 2003, Virgin Money was launched in Australia with the launch of Virgin Money credit cards. Virgin Money Australia initially launched in partnership with Macquarie Bank, followed by Westpac under a five-year agreement.

At the time of Virgin Money's launch in Australia the group company that combined the Virgin Money UK and Australian operations was co-owned by Virgin Group and HHG Group. In 2004 100% ownership of that UK/Australia group company was acquired by Virgin Group for AU$219 million.

=== First products ===
It added superannuation (2005) and home loans (2008) to their product suite. The card was Australia's first no annual fee credit card. The card was marketed as a cheaper option to most other credit cards with up to 55 interest-free days and an interest rate of 12.99% (April 2007). Customers were entitled to offers through the credit card's 'Mates rates' scheme, which included offers from other Virgin companies in Australia such as Virgin Blue, Virgin Mobile and Virgin Atlantic. A comprehensive restaurant discount scheme, operated by the Entertainment Book company, was also available.

The Virgin Credit Card was withdrawn from sale in Australia as of 3 April 2008 after the five-year agreement with Westpac came to an end. Customers could continue to use their cards as normal, but no new Virgin credit cards would be issued. When a customer's card expired, they were transitioned to the 'Ignite' card by Westpac.

=== Changes to product ranges ===
In 2008, Virgin Money Australia withdrew its home loan product from the Australian market due to the Great Recession and the credit cards portfolio was transferred to its supplier, Westpac, after the end of a five-year agreement. In 2009, Virgin Money launched car insurance, partnering with A&G Insurance Services and also announced their strategic alliance with CitiBank, with plans to launch a suite of retail banking services in 2010.

Virgin Money credit cards were relaunched in Australia on 27 July 2010 with two card types: the Velocity Rewards Credit Card, co-branded with Velocity Frequent Flyer, and the No Annual Fee Credit Card. All credit cards are also co-branded with Visa credit card.

=== Purchase by Bank of Queensland ===
In 2013 Virgin Money Australia was bought by Bank of Queensland for $40 million. Under the deal, Bank of Queensland have rights to the Virgin Money name in Australia for four decades while paying royalties to the Virgin Group, and Virgin has a seat on the board of Bank of Queensland.

== See also ==
- Virgin Money (brand)
- Banking in Australia
- List of banks
- List of banks in Australia
- List of banks in Oceania
