= Royal Bank Building =

Royal Bank Building or Royal Bank Tower may refer to:

== Australia ==
- Royal Bank of Queensland, Maryborough, a heritage-listed building in Queensland

== Canada ==
- Toronto, Ontario
  - Royal Bank Building (Toronto), a name used for two different office buildings in the Toronto's Financial District
  - Royal Bank Plaza, a Toronto office complex which serves as the de facto headquarters of the Royal Bank of Canada
- Montreal, Quebec
  - Old Royal Bank Building, Montreal, a Montreal building that served as the head office of the Royal Bank of Canada from 1928 to 1962
  - Place Ville-Marie, a Montreal office complex also known as the Royal Bank Tower due to its main tenant
- Ottawa, Ontario
  - Thomas D'Arcy McGee Building, an office building in Ottawa originally called Royal Bank Centre
- Vancouver
  - Royal Centre (Vancouver), an office building in Vancouver also known as RBC Tower or Royal Bank Tower
  - Royal Bank Tower (Vancouver), an office building in Vancouver also referred to as Royal Bank Tower
- Victoria, British Columbia
  - Royal Bank Building (Victoria, British Columbia), a historic building

== See also ==
- Royal Bank of Canada
- Royal Bank of Queensland
