= Signal Iduna =

German financial services company

SIGNAL IDUNA Group

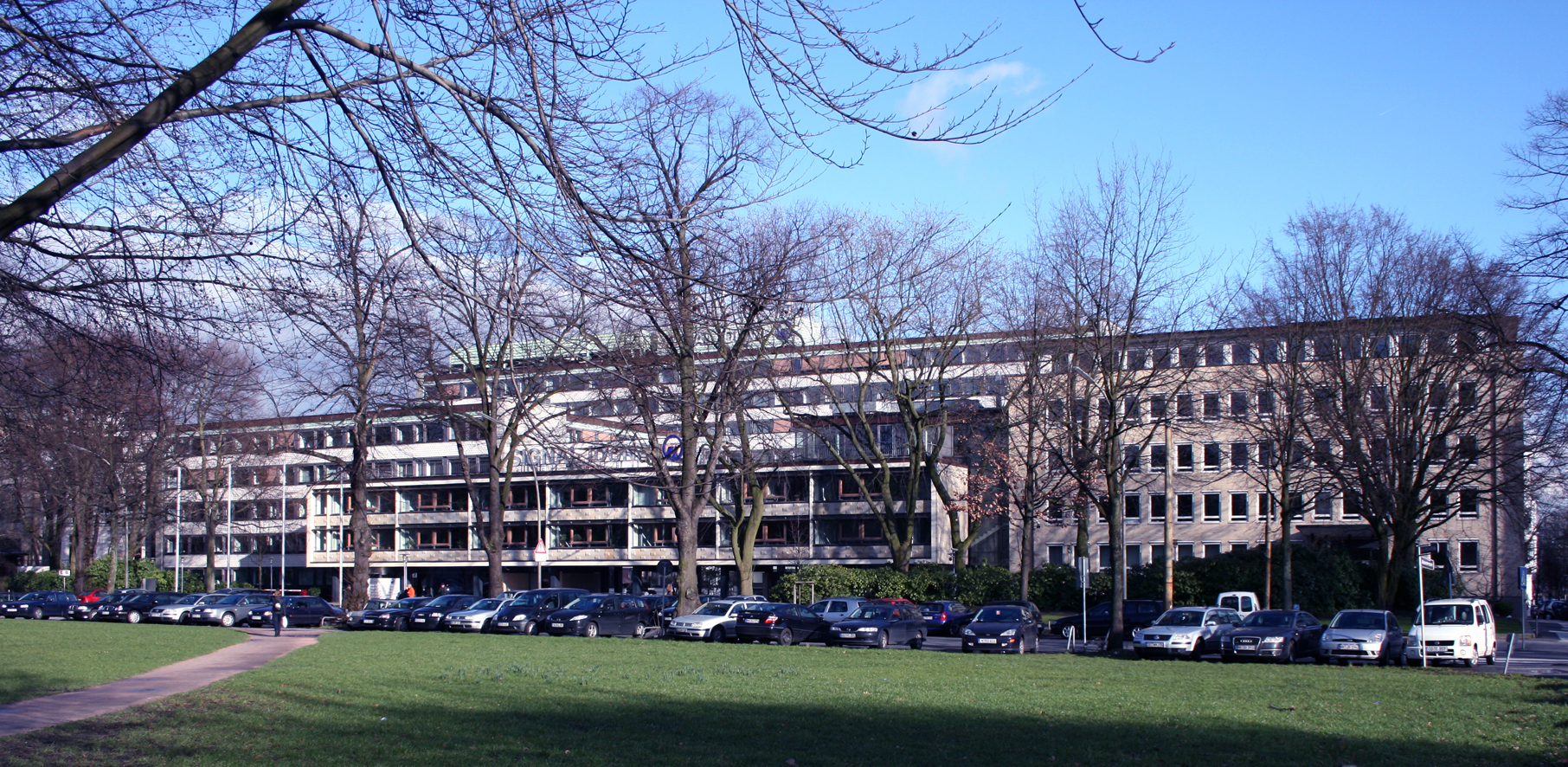
- Head office in Hamburg, Germany
- Industry: Financial services
- Founded: 1907
- Headquarters: Dortmund and Hamburg, Germany
- Key people: Torsten Uhlig (CEO); Reinhold Schulte (chairman of the supervisory board)
- Products: Insurance, banking
- Revenue: €7.0 billion (2025) (Premium income)
- Number of employees: 11,000
- Website: www.signal-iduna.de

The SIGNAL IDUNA Group offers insurance and financial services. The group was created through the merger of the Dortmund-based Signal Versicherungen and the Hamburg-based Iduna Nova Group on 1 July 1999. The companies of these two groups have been under one management ever since. Torsten Uhlig has been the Chairman of the Management Board of the Signal Iduna Group since July 2025. Since 1 April 2009, Deutscher Ring Krankenversicherungs-Verein a. G. has also been part of the Signal Iduna Group. In August 2017, it merged with Signal Krankenversicherung a. G., which has since operated under the name Signal Iduna Krankenversicherung a. G.. Within this, Deutscher Ring Krankenversicherung continues to exist as a brand.

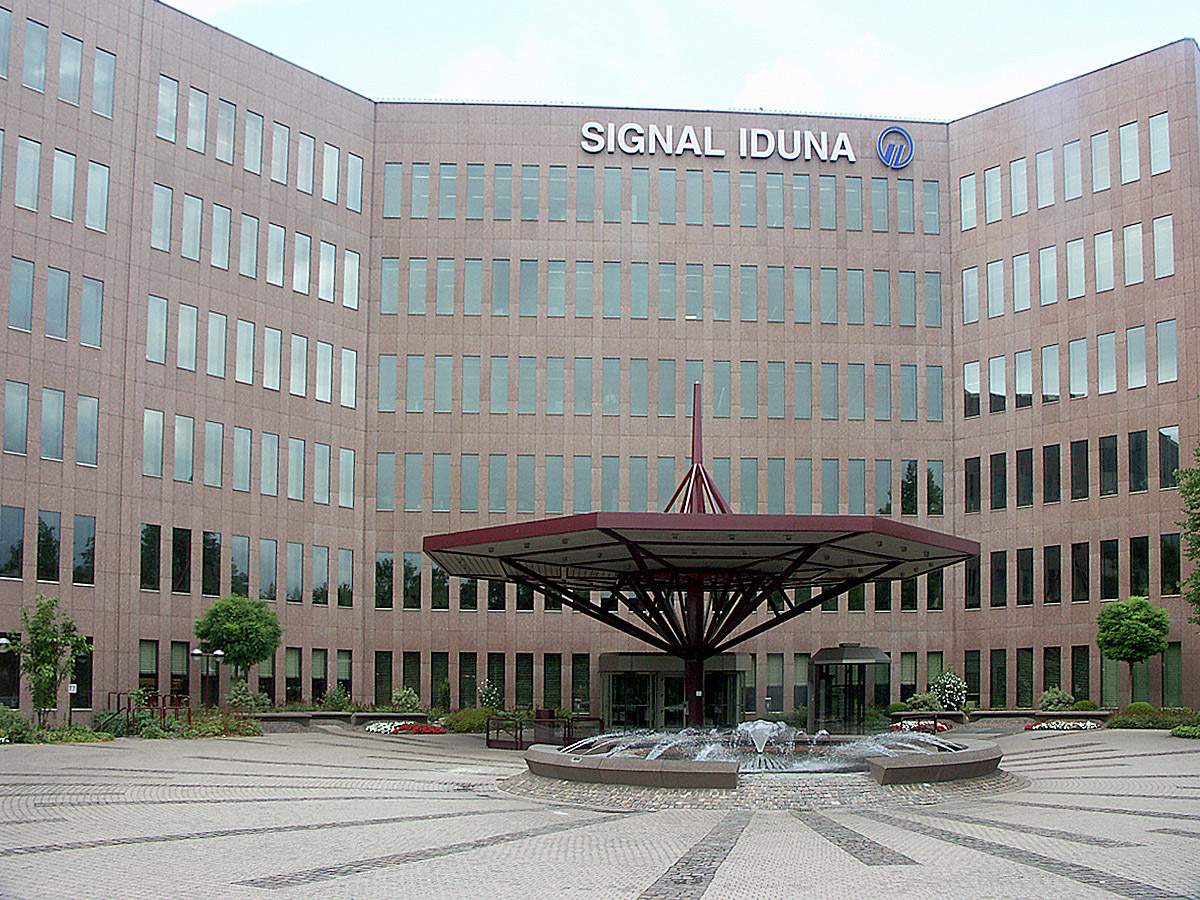
Head office located in Dortmund, Germany

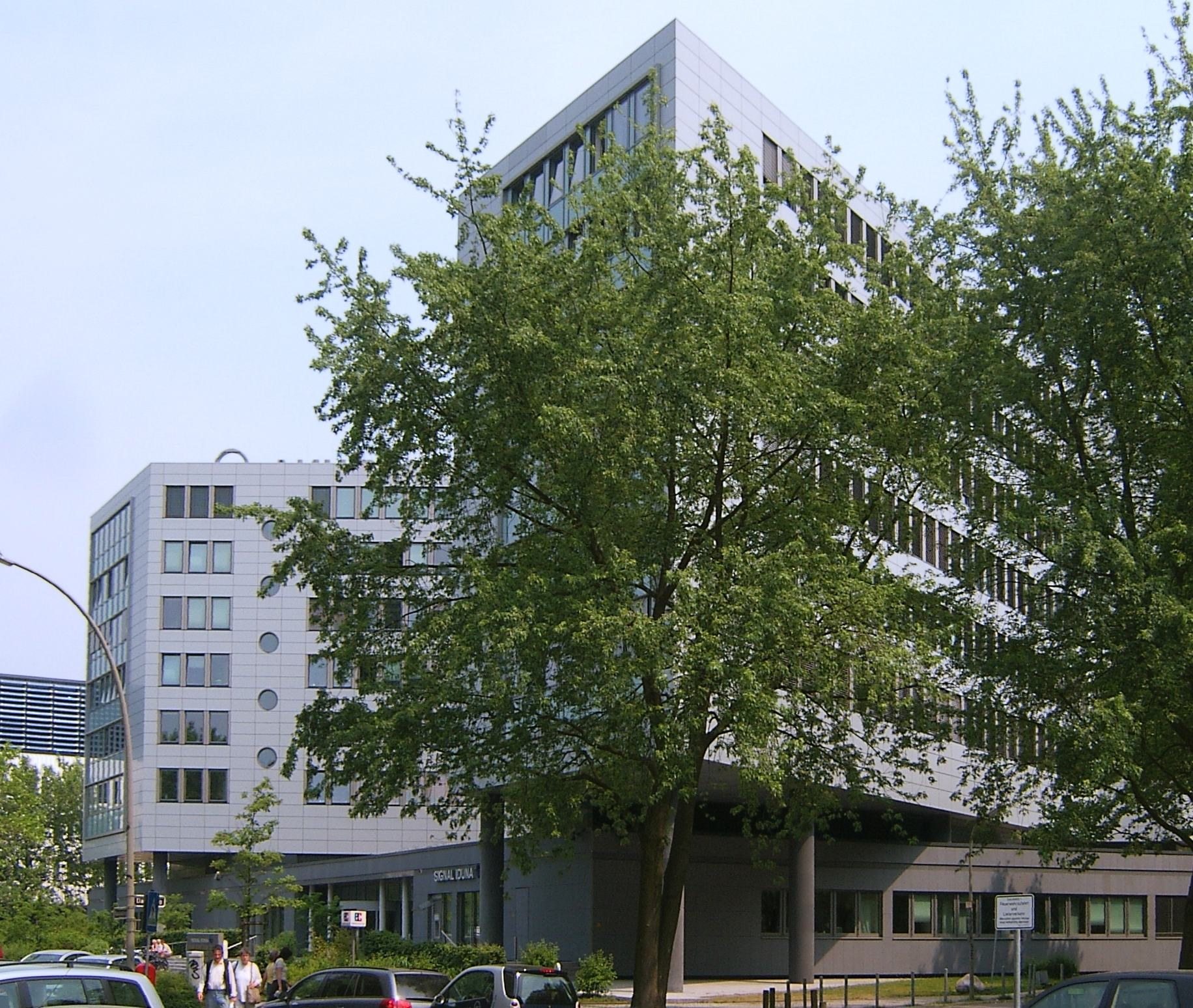
Administration in the City-Nord, Hamburg, Germany

== Business segments ==
Signal Iduna generated premium income of 6.47 billion euros in 2022. Asset investments amounted to 80.52 billion euros in 2019. 10,870 people work for the group. Sales are primarily carried out by around 2,800 self-employed (professional), exclusive insurance intermediaries (commercial agents) (§ 84 HGB), and by insurance brokers.

In addition to the insurance companies, the Signal Iduna Group includes

- Signal Iduna Krankenversicherung a. G., Dortmund
- Signal Iduna Lebensversicherung a. G., Hamburg
- Signal Iduna Unfallversicherung a. G., Dortmund
- Signal Iduna Allgemeine Versicherung Aktiengesellschaft, Dortmund
- PVAG Polizeiversicherungs-Aktiengesellschaft, Dortmund
- Versicherer für den Öffentlichen Dienst (VÖDAG), Hamburg
- Signal Iduna Pensionskasse AG, Berlin
- Adler Versicherung AG, Berlin
- DEURAG Deutsche Rechtsschutz-Versicherung|DEURAG Deutsche Rechtsschutz-Versicherung AG, Wiesbaden

as well as four providers of financial services, all of them with their head office in Hamburg:

- Donner & Reuschel Aktiengesellschaft
- HANSAINVEST Hanseatische Investment-GmbH
- Signal Iduna Bauspar AG
- Signal Iduna Asset Management GmbH

Foreign subsidiaries are Signal Iduna Biztosító Zrt. (Signal Iduna Versicherung AG), Budapest, as well as Warsaw based Signal Iduna Polska with Signal Iduna Polen Versicherung AG and Signal Iduna Polen Lebensversicherung AG and Signal Iduna Asigurări de Viaţă S.A. in Bucharest. The group also includes Signal Iduna Rückversicherungs AG with its registered office in Zug in Switzerland. Furthermore, the Signal Iduna Group is the largest shareholder of the National-Bank based in Essen, with approximately 26.4% of the shares.

== History ==
The two original groups of the group have been closely linked to the economic middle classes of crafts, trade and commerce since their creation at the beginning of the 20th century. Iduna Nova was the result of an initiative by independent craftsmen and tradesmen who founded a health and death insurance fund in Hamburg in 1906. Dortmund master craftsmen followed this example a year later and also set up a health support fund. The Hamburg Chamber of Trade (now the Hamburg Chamber of Crafts) had a special role in the founding and has had a say and a right of supervision since the founding. Two Hamburg master craftsmen deserve special mention, the builder and master stonemason Johann Reimer (1847-1917) and the master turner and later Hamburg senator Johannes Hirsch (1861–1935). The Imperial Supervisory Office in Berlin demanded 100,000 marks for the founding fund. Fourteen Hamburg banks raised half and the other half was raised by the master craftsman Johann Reimer from Hamburg's Karolinenviertel. Johannes Hirsch was chairman of the supervisory board of the "Mittelstandsversicherung" from 1914 to 1934.

The different company forms as an insurance association or public limited company have business management and tax reasons. The joint-stock companies are not listed on the stock exchange.

The Signal Iduna Group is now open to all sections of the population. However, the traditionally close ties with organisations from the trades, commerce and trade continue.

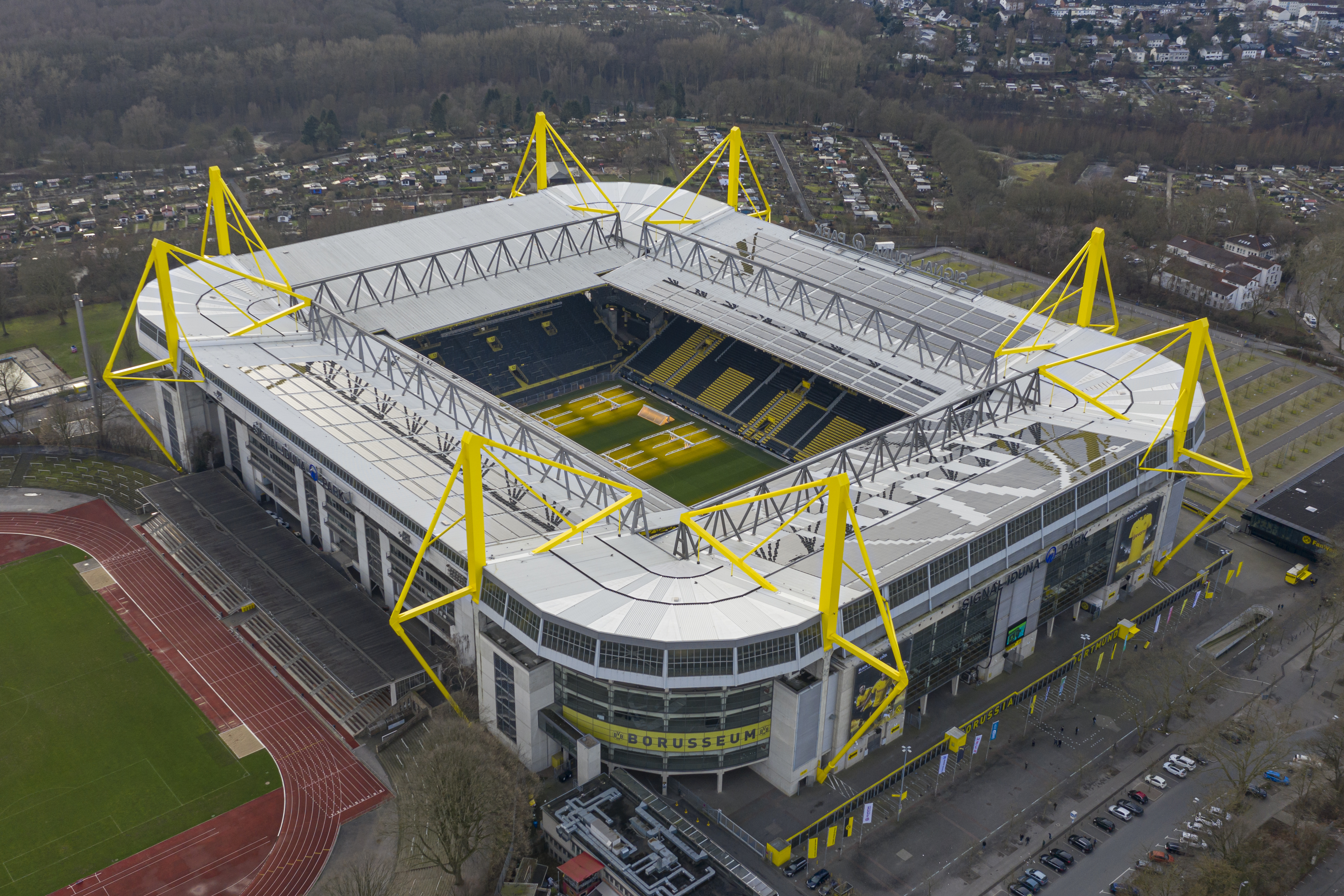
Westfalenstadion (since December 2005 officially Signal Iduna Park) in Dortmund

Through a sponsorship agreement with Borussia Dortmund, Signal Iduna acquired the naming rights to Dortmund's Westfalenstadion: Since 1 December 2005, the stadium has been called Signal Iduna Park. The contract runs until 30 June 2026.

Several skyscrapers and building complexes built by the Iduna insurance company or in whose construction it was involved carry or bore "Iduna" in their name.

The name Iduna is derived from the Norse deity "Idun(a)", the goddess who was responsible for the apples that the gods had to eat to preserve their youth and thus, as it were, their immortality.

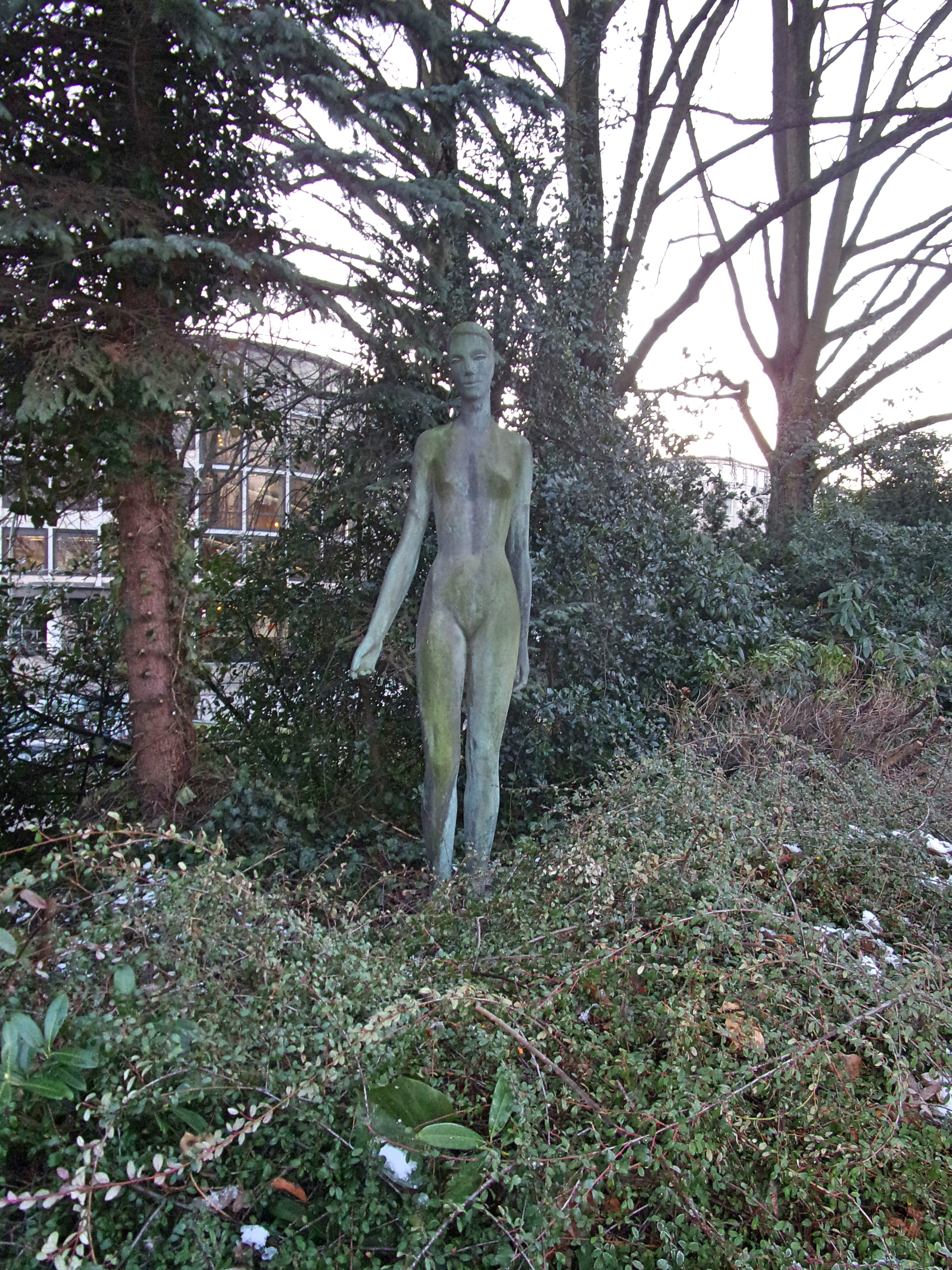
Iduna by Jean Sprenger

The sculpture of Iduna by the sculptor Jean Sprenger stands in the old Rabenstraße 32 in front of the old administration building, which was built under the direction of Bertold Beitz. The architect was Ferdinand Streb.
