= Hugh D.T. Williamson =

Australian philanthropist (1901–1985)

Hugh D.T. Williamson CBE
- Born: Hugh Dean Thomas Williamson; 4 February 1901; Ballarat
- Died: 20 December 1985 (aged 84); Melbourne
- Education: Ballarat Agricultural High School, 1917
- Occupation: Banking
- Years active: 1918–1961
- Employer: ANZ Bank
- Known for: Philanthropy
- Title: General Manager, ANZ Bank
- Term: 1954–1961
- Successor: C.R. Darvall
- Board member of: William Buckland Foundation
- Spouse: Louise Buchanan McPherson (1929–1983)
- Partner: Elaine Berkefeld (abt. 1961–1985)
- Parents: John Christopher Williamson; Jane (née Thomas) Christopher

Hugh Dean Thomas Williamson C.B.E. (1901–1985) was an Australian banking executive and philanthropist.

Williamson was born 4 February 1901 in Ballarat and died 20 December 1985 in Melbourne. He was the son of John Christopher Williamson and Jane (née Thomas) Williamson. In 1929 he married Louise Buchanan McPherson. Near the time of his retirement they began living apart. He met Elaine Berkefeld, who became his companion for the remainder of his life.

Williamson spent 44 years in banking, beginning in 1917 with the Ballarat Banking Company. He spent most of his career with the former Bank of Australasia and following the merger with ANZ rose to the position of general manager of ANZ Bank, a position he held for seven years until his retirement in June 1961. As general manager, he was responsible for eliminating the fractious attitudes following the merger, smoothing an adversarial relationship with the central bank, mechanizing back office operations, and improving branch efficiencies. He was a past president of the Australasian Institute of Banking and Finance, a predecessor of FINSIA, the Financial Services Institute of Australasia.

Post-retirement he applied the profits from his extensive investments to support his community interests, which included the Salvation Army and the trust of the Victorian Arts Centre. Through Williamson's will, the Hugh Williamson Foundation was established in 1986, and distributes more than A$1M per year. The Foundation focuses on multiple projects, including the arts the environment, scholarships and community leadership, in particular the eponymous Williamson Community Leadership Program (which later became Leadership Victoria).
