= Virgin Money =

Financial services brand

- Industry: Financial services
- Founded: 3 March 1995; 31 years ago
- Founder: Richard Branson
- Area served: Australia; United Kingdom
- Services: Finance; Banking; Mortgages
- Owner: Virgin Group and others
- Website: virgin.com

Virgin Money is a financial services brand used by two independent brand-licensees worldwide from the Virgin Group. Virgin Money branded services are currently available in Australia and the United Kingdom. The brand formerly operated in South Africa and the United States.

Each Virgin Money branded entity acts independently from the others, thus the products vary from country to country.

== Current brand licensees ==
=== Virgin Money Australia ===
Virgin Money currently has operations in Australia with 150,000 customers and is owned by Bank of Queensland.

=== Virgin Money UK ===
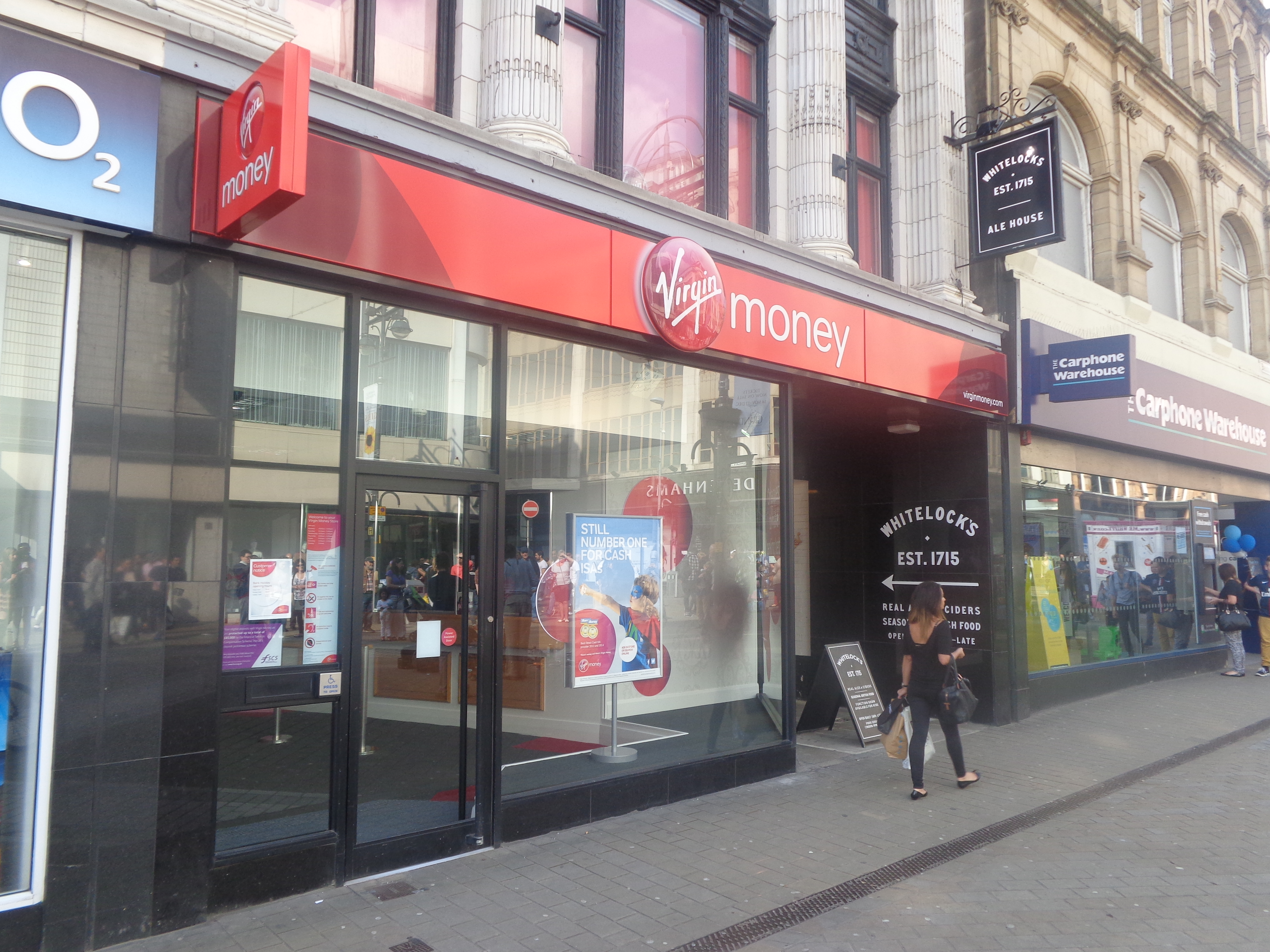
A former Northern Rock branch now in Virgin Money branding in Leeds.

Virgin Money currently has operations in the United Kingdom. The company was initially established as a personal finance company under the name of Virgin Direct in 1995, and the Virgin Money brand itself was introduced in 2000. Virgin Money vastly increased its size and customer base in 2012 with the purchase of the so-called 'good bank' portion of the nationalised Northern Rock bank.

In 2018, the entire UK operation of Virgin Money was sold to CYBG plc in a £1.7bn all-share deal which made the group the sixth-largest bank in the UK. On 31 October 2019 CYBG plc changed its name to Virgin Money UK plc.

On 7 March 2024 Nationwide Building Society, the UK's largest building society, announced that they had made an offer to buy Virgin Money UK plc for £2.9 billion. Under the terms of the deal the resulting company would be rebranded under the Nationwide banner over the next 6 years with the Virgin Money brand eventually disappearing. Nationwide intends to remain as a building society and for the "medium-term" the Virgin Money business would remain its own legal entity with its own banking licence. Nationwide aims to not make any material changes to Virgin Money's 7,300 employees "in the near term". Virgin Money's shareholders approved the deal on 21 March and it is expected to complete by the end of the year.

== Former brand licensees ==
=== Virgin Money South Africa ===
Virgin Money had operations in South Africa. In 2006, Virgin Money South Africa launched with a credit card initially in a partnership with ABSA worth $33 million.

In August 2020, it was announced that the company would be rebranding to Spot Money.

=== Virgin Money US ===
In 2007, Virgin Money launched in the US after the Virgin Group made a majority stake investment in CircleLending, a company that facilitated peer-to-peer loans. Virgin Money USA entered into dissolution on 1 November 2010, and is no longer listed as a Virgin property on the Virgin Money home page; the Virgin Money US site itself was also dismantled. Virgin Money subsequently withdrew entirely from the US market and its social lending servicing was transferred to its servicing partner, Graystone Solutions, which continues to service the social loans under its own brand.

== Corporate identity ==
The current logo of Virgin Money's operations outside the UK

Virgin Money's logo is focused around the main logo of Virgin Group, which is an underlined word 'Virgin' in a red and magenta gradient coloured circle. This logo was introduced in January 2012 to signify the purchase of Northern Rock, which used a magenta logo. Some versions of the logo use a plain red circle, such as the variant used frequently in South Africa.

Virgin Money's older logo was the word 'Virgin' in a red rounded skew rectangle, similar in shape to a credit card, followed by the word 'Money'. This logo remains in use in South Africa. The previous logo had used a red logo with the word 'Virgin' in a large circle and three smaller circles above the word 'Money'. Virgin Direct's logo had been a more simplistic rendering of the company name, in white on top of a red rectangle with a semicircle attached on the left side.

=== Logo evolution ===
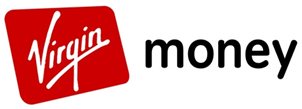
2008–2012

2019–present (UK)

2019–present (non-UK)
