= Royal Trust =

Royal Trust may refer to:

- Royal Trust (Belgium)
- Royal Trust (Canada), a trust company founded in 1899 in Montreal and part of Royal Bank of Canada since 1993
- Royal Collection Trust, a British charitable body established in 1993
- The Princess Royal Trust for Carers (UK)

== See also ==
- Royal Bank (disambiguation)
