= Spot Money =

South African online banking company

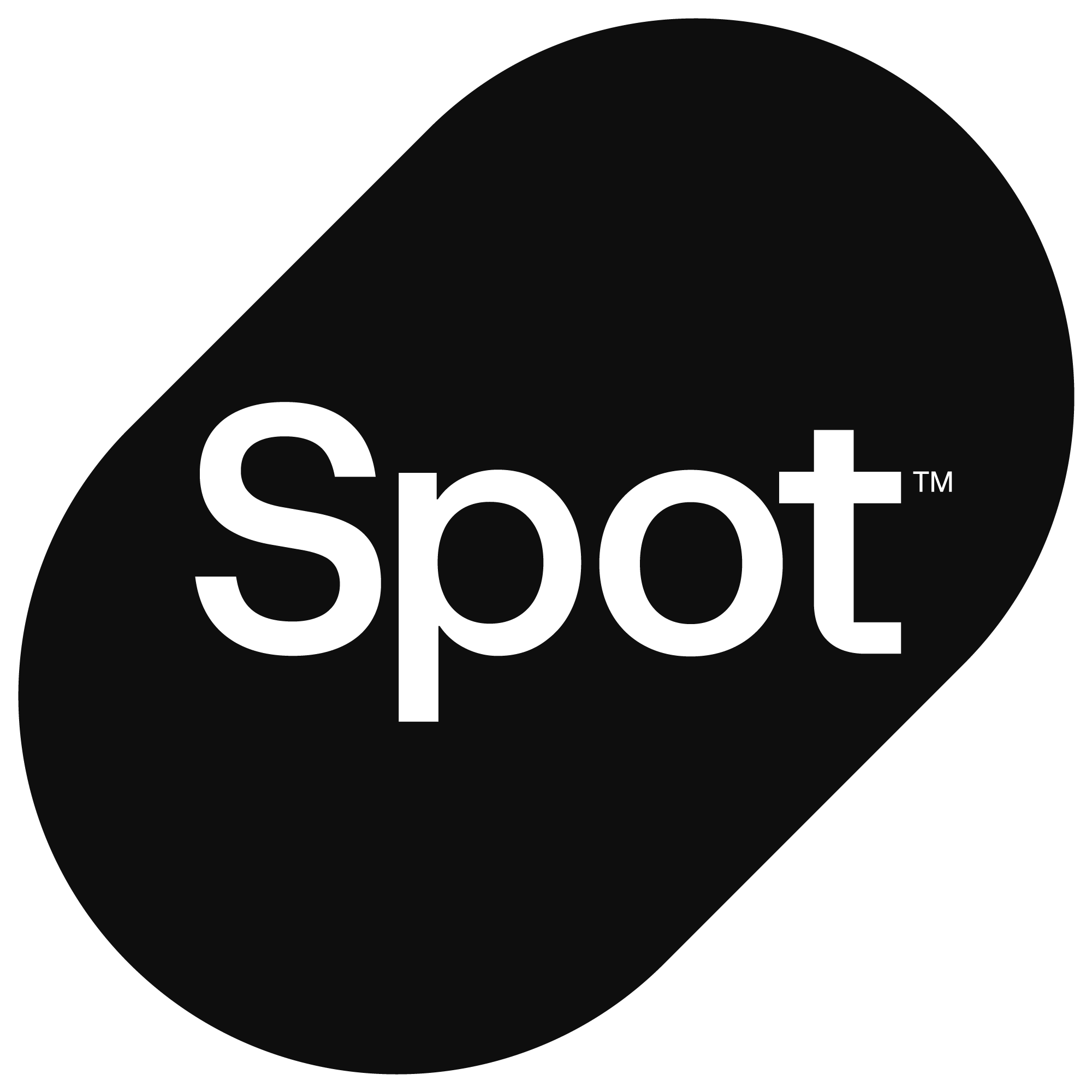
- The logo of Spot Money
- Company type: Limited company
- Industry: Banking
- Predecessor: Virgin Money South Africa
- Founded: 2006; 20 years ago in South Africa
- Headquarters: Cape Town, South Africa
- Area served: South Africa
- Key people: Andre Hugo (CEO)
- Website: spotmoney.com

Spot Money is a South African mobile banking company, that provides bank accounts, debit and credit cards using an app. The Spot app is operated in association with Bidvest Bank.

== History ==
The company launched as Virgin Money South Africa in 2006, as a partnership between Virgin Group (owners of the Virgin Money brand) and Absa, as an issuer of credit cards. The 50-50 joint venture was worth R240 million at the time of launch. By 2013 Virgin Money's customers had R1 billion in total credit. Virgin Money SA launched their Spot app cashless platform in February 2018. As of July 2019 the Spot app had 400,000 users.

Following the discontinuation of the Virgin Money South Africa credit card, the company and app was acquired by its management and a local private equity company, and renamed Spot Money. The 118,000 former credit card customers, with R750 million in total credit, were transferred to Absa's own credit card offering.

== 2026 Service Disruption ==
On 1 March 2026 at approximately 18:00, Spot Money reported a service disruption affecting transactions across its platform. The company stated that the incident impacted certain payment and card services, resulting in failed or delayed transactions for some users. As of 3 March 2026, the disruption was still ongoing while technical teams investigated the issue and worked to restore normal service.
