= Bank of Queensland (1917–1922) =

Australian (trading) bank

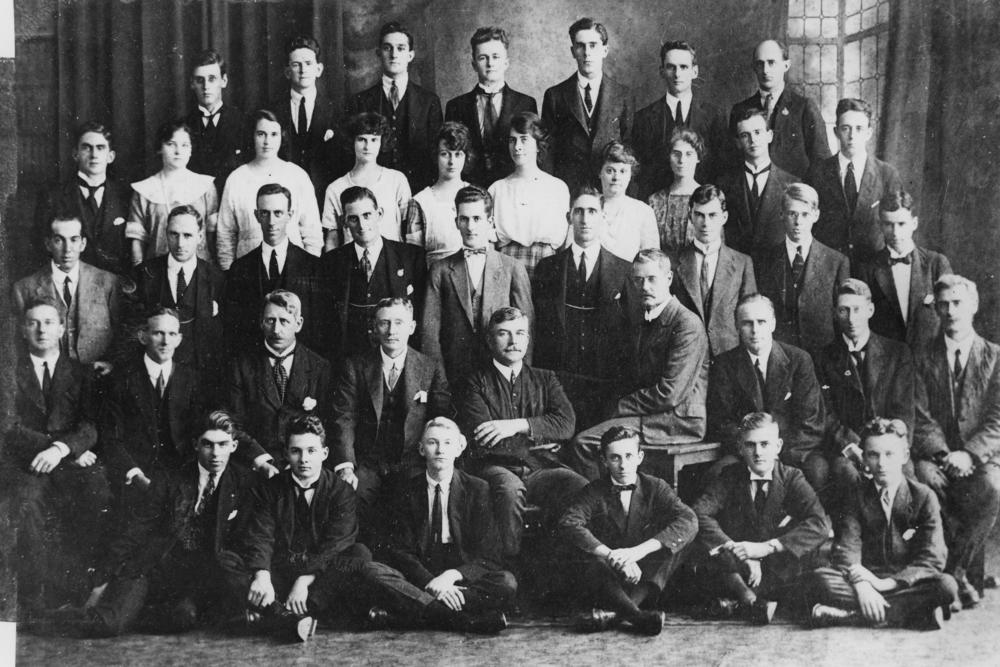
Staff members of the Bank of Queensland, Brisbane, 1922

The Bank of Queensland was a bank in Queensland, Australia. It flourished between 1917 and 1922. It was created by the January 1917 merger of the Royal Bank of Queensland with the Bank of North Queensland.

The National Bank was not well represented in Queensland and, intending to expand itself into a truly national institution, bought the Bank of Queensland for cash on 9 January 1922 "for a price corresponding with the actual assets of £520,000". Their offer was accepted by the former shareholders immediately after it was approved by the National Bank's shareholders.

== Other trading banks named Bank of Queensland ==
1863–1866

A Bank of Queensland had been established in London and opened for business in Brisbane on 13 August 1863 in the renovated premises of the former Joint Stock Bank.

Caught by the fall-out from the July 1866 collapse of the major London discount house Overend, Gurney and Company, the shareholders agreed at the end of 1866 to voluntarily wind the bank up.

1970–

The Bank of Queensland's name has since been revived by a different institution. The former Brisbane Permanent Benefit Building and Investment Society, which had operated as a savings bank since 1887 and then as a trading bank since 1942, took on the name Bank of Queensland in 1970.
