= Ballarat Banking Company =

The Ballarat Banking Company was a long-lasting regional bank based in the city of Ballarat, Victoria, Australia, operating from 1865 to 1955.

It commenced operation in June 1865, having occupied the former Ballarat premises of the Oriental Bank Corporation. It was one of the banks to suspend payments in the 1892-93 banking crisis, closing in March 1892 but reopening in June 1892 after negotiations with creditors. Hugh Dean Thomas Williamson gained his first banking job with the bank c. 1917.

It "confined its activities to the Ballarat district", but "[flourished] in its original form" for nearly a century. In 1934, it had branches in Ballarat and three adjoining towns.

It was acquired by the National Bank of Australasia in 1955 for £375,000. It held deposits of £712,000 and advances of £439,000 at the time. At its closure it was the last remaining unit bank and provincial bank in Australia. Its closure reduced the amount of independent private trading banks in Australia to six.
