= Banque Nationale =

Banque Nationale (lit. 'National bank') may refer to:

- Banque Nationale Agricole, state-controlled bank in Tunisia
- BNP Paribas (Banque Nationale de Paris), commercial bank
- National Bank of Canada (Banque Nationale du Canada), commercial bank
- Banque Nationale was the first name of Banque Canadienne Nationale, later amalgamated into National Bank of Canada
- National Bank of Belgium (Banque Nationale de Belgique), central bank
- Swiss National Bank (Banque Nationale de Suisse), central bank

== See also ==
- National bank (disambiguation)
