= Virgin Superannuation =

Virgin Superannuation is an Australian superannuation fund, or pension fund, offered by Virgin Group subsidiary Virgin Money in Australia. Virgin Super launched in 2005 under the Virgin Money Australia brand. Initially backed by fund manager Macquarie Investment Management, Virgin Super is a passive managed index fund that is operated by Mercer.

== History ==
Virgin Super launched in 2005 by Virgin Money Australia.

In 2010, Virgin Super launched the Virgin Super Baby Break, meaning Australian parents are exempt from super fees whilst they are on maternity or paternity leave.

In 2016, Virgin announced that it had folded its struggling super fund into the Mercer Super Trust. The fund would continue to use the Virgin Money Australia brand.
