= Royal Bank of Queensland, Maryborough =

Royal Bank of Queensland
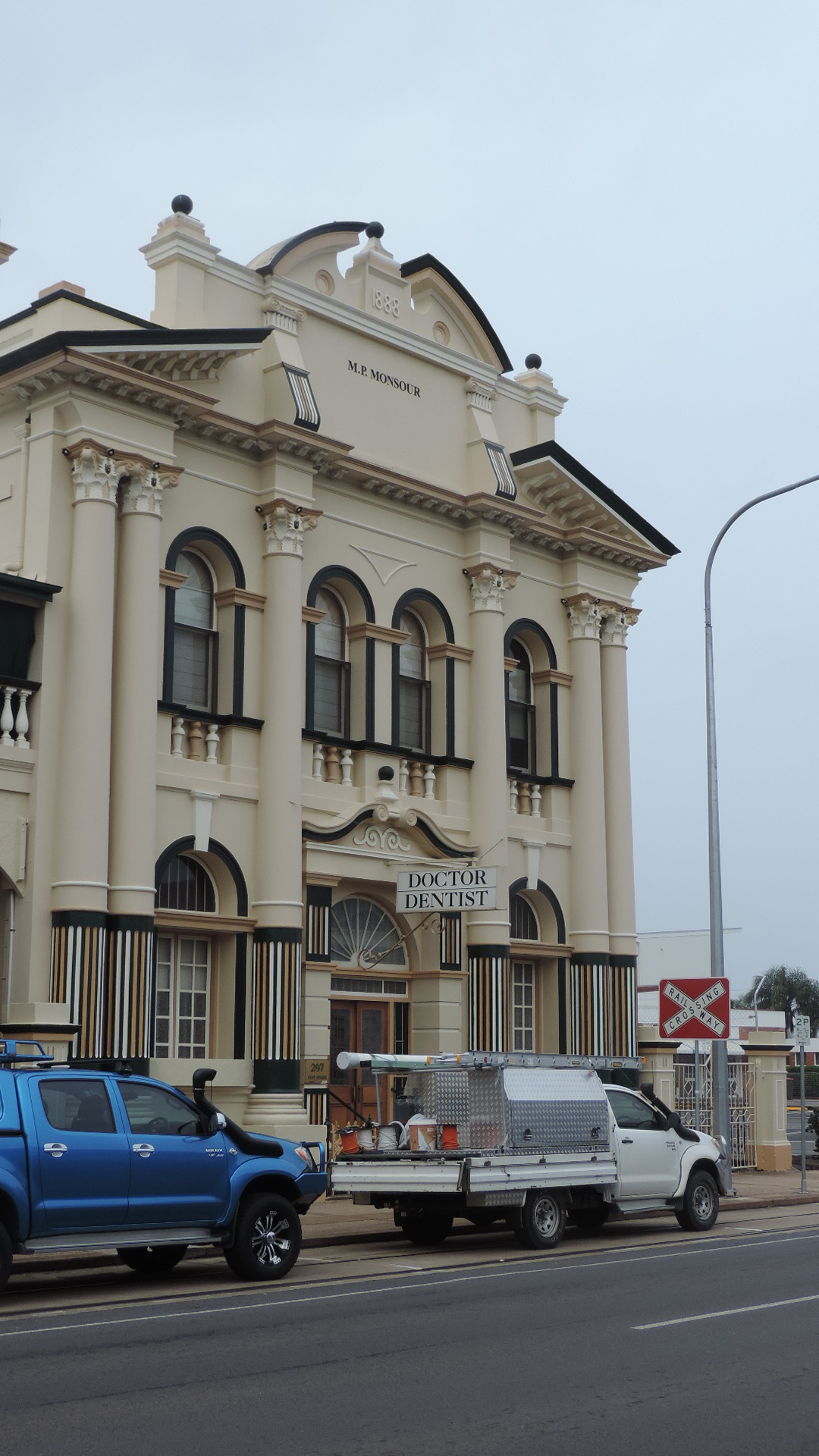
- Royal Bank of Queensland, 2016

- Location within Queensland Location within Australia
- 25.5396°S 152.7055°E
- Location: 297 Kent Street, Maryborough, Fraser Coast Region, Queensland, Australia

History
- Design period: 1870s–1890s (late 19th century)
- Built: 1888–1889

Site notes
- Architect: Victor Emmanuel Carandini
- Architectural style: Classicism

Queensland Heritage Register
- Official name: Royal Bank (former), Queensland International Heritage College, Windsor House
- Type: state heritage (built)
- Designated: 21 October 1992
- Reference no.: 600699
- Significant period: 1880s (fabric); 1889–c. 1973 (historical use as bank)
- Significant components: banking chamber, residential accommodation – manager's house/quarters

Royal Bank of Queensland is a heritage-listed former bank at 297 Kent Street, Maryborough, Fraser Coast Region, Queensland, Australia. It was designed by Victor Emmanuel Carandini and built from 1888 to 1889. It is also known as Queensland International Heritage College and Windsor House. It was added to the Queensland Heritage Register on 21 October 1992.

== History ==
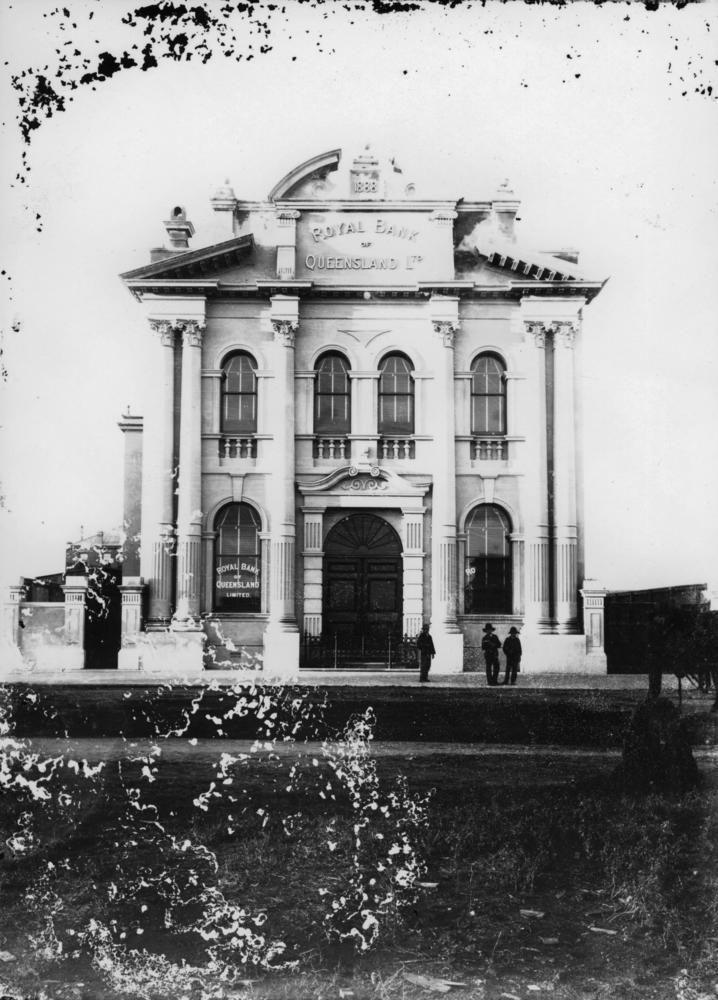
Maryborough branch of the Royal Bank of Queensland, 1889

The former Royal Bank of Queensland was constructed in 1888–1889 to the design of Brisbane architect, Victor Carandini. The building was the first branch of the Royal Bank of Queensland opened in Maryborough.

The original township of Maryborough was situated, not in its current place, but on the north of the Mary River, after wharves were established in 1847–1848 providing transport for wool from sheep stations on the Burnett River. In 1850 Surveyor, Hugh Roland Labatt arrived in Maryborough with instructions to suggest the best sites for the towns and wharves. The site recommended by Labatt was not where settlement was established but further east to allow for the development of deeper wharves and from the early 1850s this is where the town developed. During the 1860s and 1870s Maryborough flourished as the principal port of the nearby Gympie goldfield and as an outlet for timber and sugar. The establishment of manufacturing plants and primary industries sustained its growth as a major regional centre.

Many banks opened branches in Maryborough during the nineteenth century, and the Royal Bank of Queensland opened a branch in 1888 after many of the other banks were established. The Royal Bank was established in about 1886, and their head office was opened in February 1886, with shareholders concentrating on business, mining and agricultural interests near the eastern coast. The architect chosen to design the Royal Bank was Brisbane architect, Victor Carandini who practised from 1885 in partnership with Alfred Banks and from mid-1887 in private practice. He won several competitions and designed a number of fine buildings throughout Queensland, including a fire station in Townsville; St Thomas' Church of England, Beaudesert; a School of Arts in Redland Bay and the Post Office Hotel in Maryborough. The new bank building was designed to incorporate the banking chamber and offices on the ground floor and a residence for the manager on the upper floor, a common practice in regional banks at the time.

The Royal Bank merged with the Bank of North Queensland in about 1917 to form the Bank of Queensland. In 1921 this in turn merged with the Queensland National Bank and became part of the National Bank of Australasia Limited in the late 1940s. This merging meant that many banks in Maryborough were surplus to requirements and the former Royal Bank was one of these, being sold in 1973. It became known as Windsor House and was leased as private tenancies, including some residential use and as a restaurant. In 1983 it was purchased as a group medical practice and also contained pathology laboratories until 1995, when it changed hands again. It was then opened as the Queensland International Heritage College. At this time some of the internal partitions erected for previous tenants were removed and the building was painted.

== Description ==
The former Royal Bank is a substantial two storeyed rendered brick building prominently located on Kent Street, Maryborough.

The symmetrically composed principal facade of the building is divided into three bays by round pilasters on square planned plinths. The capitals of the pilasters are of the Corinthian order and from the base to about one third of the overall height, the pilasters are reeded. The central bay is flanked by single pilasters and the pilasters at the corner of the building are paired. Surmounting the pilasters are panels which project from the face of an entablature but have similar mouldings. Above this is a large broken triangular pediment which acts as a parapet, and runs the entire width of the building but comprises a central signage panel, broken arched pediment at the apex, mouldings and urns. Between the pilasters on the face of the building are a number of round arched window openings. The openings on the upper storey, glazed with timber framed sashes, are above blind Italianate balustrades. The central ground floor entrance, is through a round arched opening which is flanked by rusticated pillars supporting an entablature and a scrolled curved pediment. Flanking the central entrance, in the recesses of the side bays are round arched openings.

The three elevations of the building which do not address Kent Street are of rendered brick and are less richly decorated, featuring segmental arched openings, a double storeyed verandah and a moulded parapet.

== Heritage listing ==
The former Royal Bank was listed on the Queensland Heritage Register on 21 October 1992 having satisfied the following criteria.

The place is important in demonstrating the evolution or pattern of Queensland's history.

The former Royal Bank is of historical importance for demonstrating the growth of Maryborough in the 1880s when many financial institutes established branches.

The place is important in demonstrating the principal characteristics of a particular class of cultural places.

The building is a good example of a late nineteenth-century bank influenced by classical architecture, reinforcing the banking values of tradition and strength.

The place is important because of its aesthetic significance.

The former bank is a well composed building of architectural value and a prominent element of the streetscape.
