= Nationalbank =

Nationalbank may refer to:

- Danmarks Nationalbank, the central bank of Denmark
- Nationalbank für Deutschland, a bank that merged into Darmstädter und Nationalbank in 1922
- Oesterreichische Nationalbank, Austria's central bank

== See also ==
- National bank (disambiguation)
