= Hugo William Du Rietz =

Australian pioneer gold miner and architect

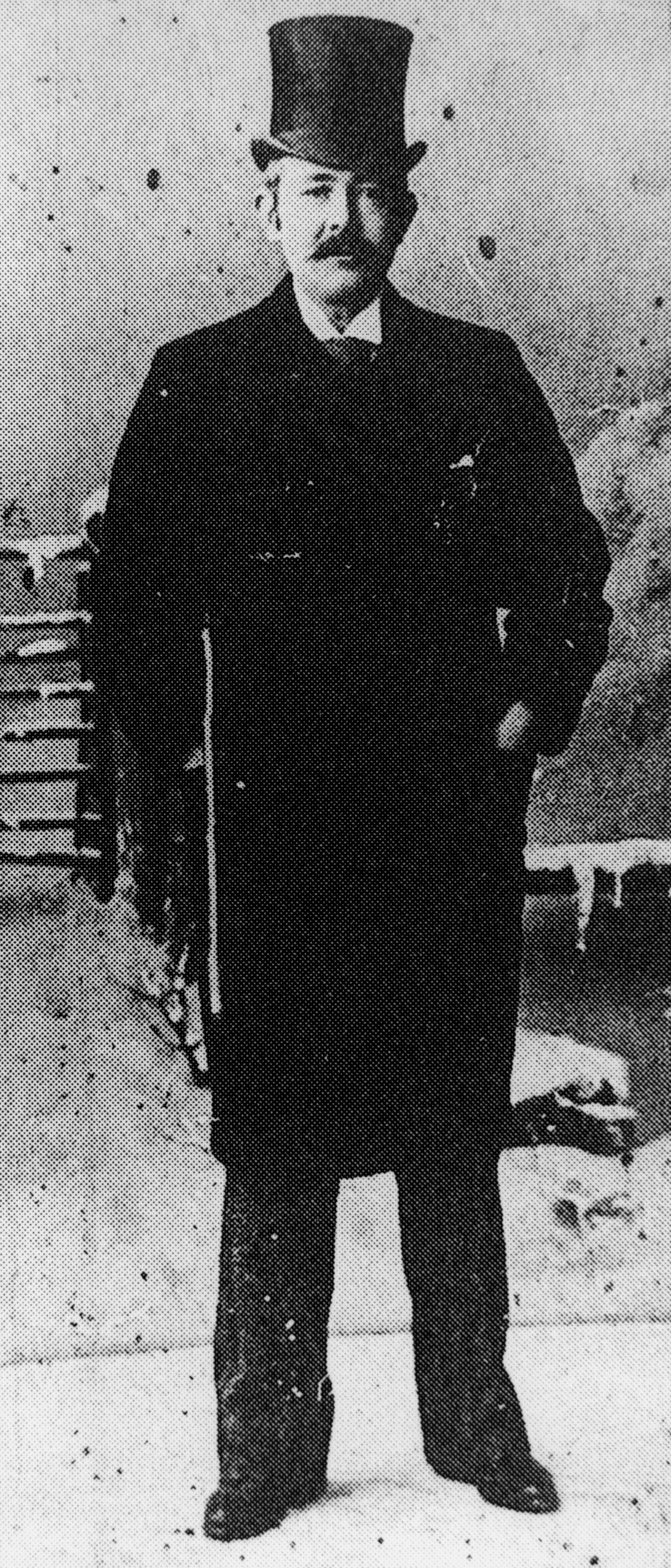
Hugo Du Rietz of Gympie

Hugo William Du Rietz (sometimes written as Du Reitz, Durietz, Dureitz) (c. 1831–1908) was a pioneer gold miner and architect in Gympie, Queensland, Australia. He was the architect of many heritage-listed buildings in Gympie.

== Early life ==
Hugo William Du Rietz was born 3 April 1831 in Vittskövle, Sweden, the son of Johan Fredrik Du Rietz (a lieutenant in the Royal Navy of Sweden) and his wife Johanna Ulrika Charlotte Borgh Hugo Du Rietz was educated as an architect and served in 1849 in the First Schleswig War as a volunteer for Denmark.

== Immigration to Australia ==
Attracted by news of the gold rush, Du Rietz emigrated to Ballarat, Victoria in 1852 where he had some success in alluvial gold mining. He was present during the Eureka Rebellion.

He came to Queensland following reports of gold being found at Canoona (near Rockhampton). However, the Canoona gold rush produced very little gold. He then moved to Brisbane where he established himself as a building contractor. In 1865 he built the Bank of New South Wales building at the corner of Queen and George Streets (which was replaced in 1928 with the present Bank of New South Wales Building). He was also an active member in the first years of the Brisbane Municipal Council.

== Gympie pioneer ==
However, he was drawn to the Gympie gold rush in 1867 and then resided in Gympie for the rest of his life.

Although he invested in gold mining in Gympie, he was not successful in any major finds of gold, and so instead involved himself in architecture and the development of Gympie and its civic institutions. He designed and/or supervised the erection of most of the large buildings in Gympie. He was Secretary of the Gympie Hospital for many years and an active member of the Gympie School of Arts.

His interests extended to agriculture. He imported the first cream separator into Queensland (possibly the first in Australia) and he built the first silo in Gympie.

== Later life ==
After a year of poor health, Du Rietz died after a short illness on Sunday 9 August 1908 aged 77 years. His graveside funeral was held later that afternoon. He was described as a man of adventurous spirit and enterprise.

== Works ==
- Gympie School of Arts (now the Gympie Regional Art Gallery)
- Surface Hill Uniting Church (now a funeral home)
