= National-Bank =

Regional bank in Germany

Coordinates: 51.4550°N 7.0119°E

National-Bank AG
- Company type: Joint-stock company
- Industry: Financial services
- Predecessor: Duisburger Bankverein; Oberhausener Bank
- Founded: 1921; 105 years ago
- Headquarters: Essen, Germany
- Number of locations: 18 branches
- Area served: North Rhine-Westphalia
- Services: Banking services
- Total assets: 4.644 million Euros (2018)
- Number of employees: 564 (2018)
- Website: www.national-bank.de

National-Bank is a German regional bank that provides services in North Rhine-Westphalia. It is a medium-sized bank with around 600 employees and 18 branches, it provides services for approximately 100,000 retail clients, freelancers, corporate clients and institutional investors with a focus on medium-sized companies.

== History ==
The National Bank was founded in 1921 under the name Deutsche Volksbank as the bank of the Christian trade union movement for the so-called "little people". In the same year, Adam Stegerwald commissioned Heinrich Brüning, later Chancellor of the Reich, to found the Vereinsbank für deutsche Arbeit AG in Berlin, where the headquarters of the General Association of Christian Trade Unions was also located. Later in the same year, the institute was given the name Deutsche Volksbank AG. In October 1922, the general meeting voted to move its headquarters to Essen. However, the occupation of the Ruhr region and hyperinflation proved to be considerable burdens. In addition, most of the managers were not banking specialists, but functionaries of trade union organisations; moreover, the business model fluctuated between a trade union "savings bank" and a financing instrument for cooperative and social projects. In 1931, the bank was on the brink of collapsing.

In 1933, when the NSDAP seized power, the name was changed to National-Bank and a strategic reorientation as a regional bank for small and medium-sized enterprises took place. Essen's Gauleiter, Josef Terboven, installed his confidant and publishing director Wolfgang Müller-Clemm as controller in the bank. The union shares were taken over by the Bank der deutschen Arbeit, which exercised a kind of holding function for the German Labour Front. The bank was capitalized and refocused on medium-sized companies with an affinity for National Socialism and their credit requirements. It was therefore given the new name. Hochtief, Krupp, Rheinisch-Westfälische Elektrizitätswerke, Stinnes and Vereinigte Stahlwerke became shareholders, but the largest investor was the Bank für Industrie-Obligationen (from which the industrial credit bank IKB emerged). The bank attempted to participate in the "Aryanization" of Bankhaus Simon Hirschland in Essen, but it was only possible, through a substantial capital increase, to purchase a stake in the new Bankhaus Burkhard & Co. With the takeover of Duisburger Bankverein AG in 1942, the bank expanded by means of additional acquisitions.

After the war, the British allowed the bank to remain in their occupation zone, but the board of directors was completely changed. Oberhausener Bank AG was taken over in 1957, of which IKB held the largest share of around 26.4%. It was sold to the Signal Iduna Group in 2000. From the late 1990s, Essener Bank extended its activities to Dortmund, Düsseldorf and Wuppertal. Like many other banks, however, it invested in securitised loan receivables on the US mortgage market. These securities were considered "toxic" after the collapse of IKB. The company was restructured and strategically reoriented towards so-called wealth management for wealthy private clients. In 2013, the regional bank cut about 70 jobs as a result of the financial crisis.

In Münster, the National Bank opened another branch in 2014, with a total of 14 employees in 2016.

In February 2016, National-Bank withdrew from the cities of Recklinghausen, Hattingen and Gladbeck and reduced its branch network in Essen by two locations.

== Personalities ==
- Erich Edgar Schulze, Chairman of the Supervisory Board

== See also ==
- List of banks in Germany

== Literature ==
- Joachim Scholtyseck: The History of the National-Bank 1921 to 2011 Franz Steiner, Stuttgart 2011.
