= Gympie School of Arts =

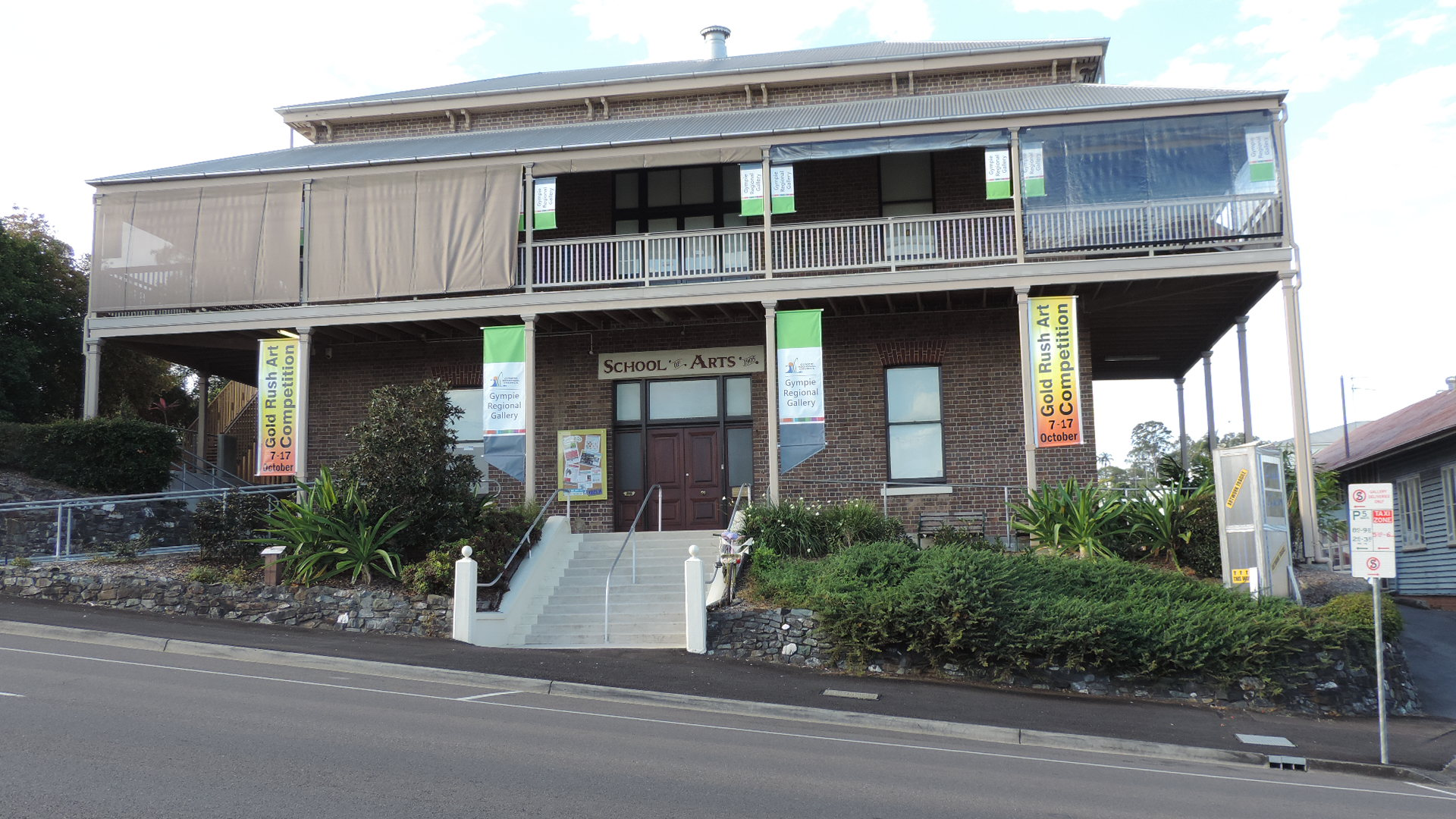
- Gympie School of Arts, 2015

- Location within Queensland Location within Australia
- 26.1881°S 152.6604°E
- Location: 39 Nash Street, Gympie, Gympie Region, Queensland, Australia

History
- Design period: 1900–1914 (early 20th century)
- Built: 1904–1905

Site notes
- Architect: Hugo William Du Rietz
- Architectural style: Classicism

Queensland Heritage Register
- Official name: Gympie School of Arts
- Type: state heritage (built)
- Designated: 23 April 1999
- Reference no.: 601910
- Significant period: 1900s–1920s (historical); 1900s (fabric); 1904–1920s (social)
- Significant components: School of Arts

Gympie School of Arts is a heritage-listed school of arts (Note: Schools of Arts were known throughout much of Australia, outside Queensland, as Mechanics' institutes. In Britain too, where they originated, most were called Mechanics' institutes. The names varied in many places, however. The founding institute of the movement, formed in 1821, was called the Edinburgh School of Arts.) at 39 Nash Street, Gympie, Gympie Region, Queensland, Australia. It was designed by architect Hugo William Du Rietz (sometimes written as Durietz) and was built from 1904 to 1905. It was added to the Queensland Heritage Register on 23 April 1999. It is now home to the Gympie Regional Gallery.

== History ==
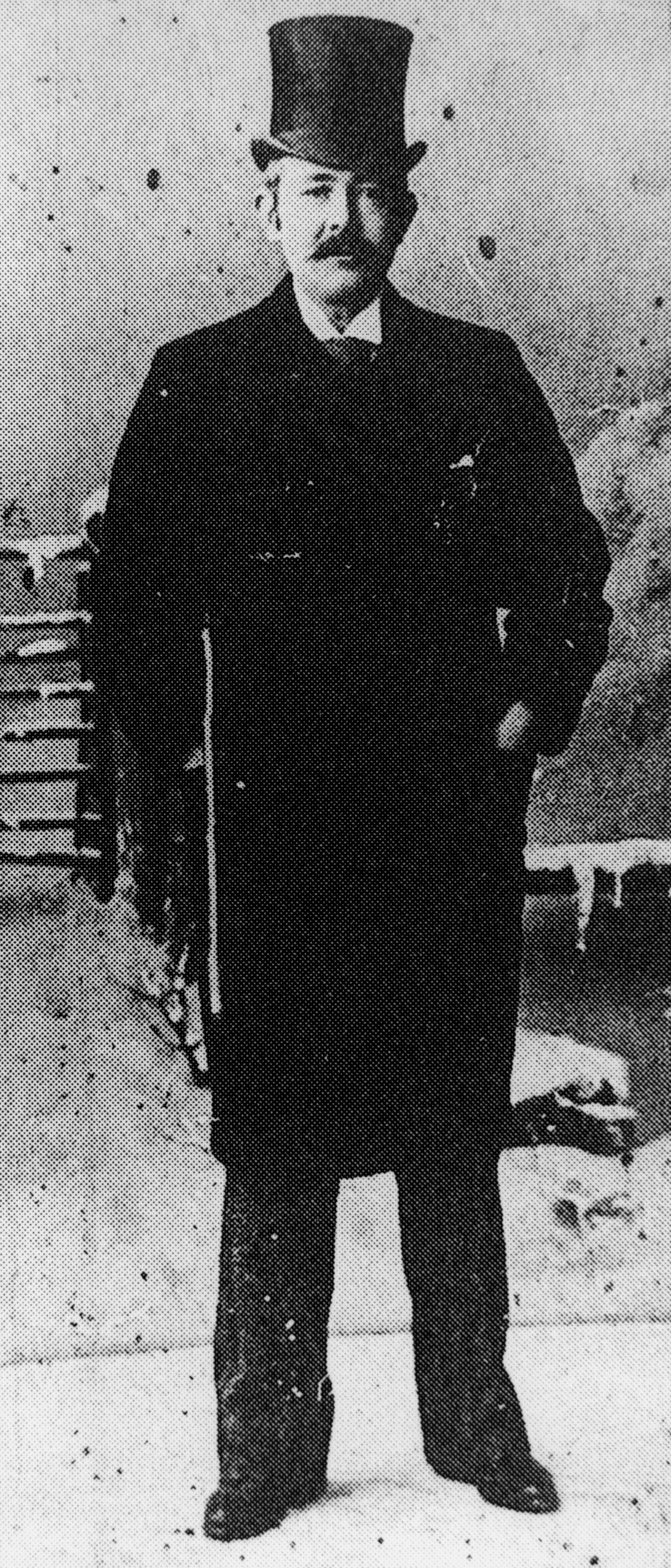
Hugo Du Rietz of Gympie

The Gympie School of Arts is a substantial two storeyed brick building located on a prominent Gympie site. Constructed between 1904 and 1905, it was designed by local architect Hugo William Du Rietz.

The School of Arts movement began in the 1820s, when Mechanics Institute were established in Glasgow and London, and a School of Arts was established in Edinburgh. Their intention was to promote mental and moral improvement of the working classes. The first institute in Australia was formed in Hobart in 1827, followed by Sydney in 1833, from which date the movement rapidly spread throughout the rest of the colony.

The first School of Arts in Queensland was established in Brisbane in 1846, although its building was not erected until 1864. From this beginning, approximately 350 Schools of Arts were established throughout the state during the nineteenth and twentieth centuries.

The intention of Schools of Arts was that they address the educational needs of the working classes, although it appears they were directed more towards the middle classes, with lectures on subjects such as philosophy, and classes in French and Latin, which may not have appealed to a largely illiterate working class. Some institutes also provided technical classes including measured drawing, painting and typewriting and all Schools of Arts provided a variety of entertainments as well as games, lending libraries and reading rooms.

The Gympie School of Arts was first established in 1870. Gold had been discovered in the region by James Nash in 1867, and the town grew rapidly. By 1868 there were 560 business licenses and 15,000 miners rights.

The impetus for a School of Arts was provided by Edward Bytheway, early settler and shopkeeper, and later mayor. Bytheway was involved in many community organisations including the local hospital and the Agricultural, Pastoral and Mining Company. Most Schools of Arts established in Queensland were driven by community minded men, usually middle or upper class, many with political aspirations.

The committee applied to the government for land on which to construct a suitable building. A temporary reading room was established in an existing building until the construction of a hall in 1874. There were many disputes over the siting of the hall, with some members wanting it near the government buildings, and others wanting it where it would be more accessible to the mass of the population in general. There were also disputes over whether the School of Arts should merge with the One Mile Miners Institute. Although this occurred in the early 1890s, it was unsuccessful and had dissolved prior to the erection of the new building.

It was decided that a new building was required as early as 1890, however the institute was financially insecure, owing to poor subscription levels. By 1904, there was £1000 in the building fund, and the committee decided that this, coupled with the proposed sale of the existing building was sufficient to erect a new building.

Local architect, Hugo Du Rietz, who had previously served on the School of Arts committee, was requested to draw up plans for a new building which was not to exceed £1500. The committee provided a preferred layout, based on the workings of the previous building.

The design for the new building was of a functional nature with few decorative features. Constructed of brick it was two-storeyed with verandahs to the upper floor. The ground floor had a central entrance, with a library on the right and four classrooms on the left. The upper floor contained two rooms with specially reinforced floors for billiard tables and a reading room across the front of the building.

Hugo Du Rietz, the architect had arrived in Gympie at the beginning of the gold rush. He established many businesses in Gympie and was a member of various committees, including that of the School of Arts. By 1871, he was practising as an architect in Gympie, and designed many buildings in the town in the ensuing years.

The new School of Arts cost £1 400 and was officially opened on 28 February 1905 as the School of Arts and Technical College. It provided classes in practical subjects, which were also provided for state school students from 1909 on.

As with all Schools of Arts the 1920s saw the beginning of the demise of the institute. New forms of entertainment such as the radio, increases in car ownership resulting in a more mobile community, world wars and the economic collapse of the 1930s all contributed to reductions in membership. As members paid subscriptions, this financially disabled most institutes.

In order to raise revenue, the upstairs reading room was converted into a flat for rent in 1941. The role of the School of Arts was further diminished in the 1970s, when technical education was taken over by TAFE and the Gympie Adult Education Organisation. However, this was also a period where government support was given to the development of a free library system, and in January 1975, $30 000 was allocated to refurbish the School of Arts as a municipal library. At the end of 1975, the School of Arts Trustees resigned and the administration of the library was taken over by the Gympie City Council.

As well as the library, the building also housed the Wide Bay Regional Council, Police Department and National Fitness Council at various times. In 1985, the building was shared by the library, and the Local History Collection, which was located in the former reading room. It was during this period that air conditioning and a book lift were installed in the building.

The library moved to new premises in 1995, leaving the School of Arts building unoccupied. It was later reused to house the Gympie Regional Gallery.

== Description ==
The Gympie School of Arts is a substantial two storey brick building, located on one of the main streets of Gympie. It is situated on a sloping site, with rock walls retaining gardens beds in the front. Access is via a centrally located concrete stair, or a ramp which located on the western side of the site. The rear of the site is bitumened for car parking.

The building is of brown face brick laid in English bond, with deep red voussoirs over the windows. It is symmetrically designed with centrally placed cedar entrance doors with fanlight and sidelights. These are flanked by double hung windows on either side. This arrangement is replicated on the upper level.

The upper level has a verandah which runs across the front elevation and halfway around the side elevations which is simply designed and comprises timber square posts with smaller square balusters. The end of the verandah on the eastern side is partially enclosed to form a kitchen, and a stair leads from the verandah on the opposite side. The verandah roof attaches to the building below the main roofline, allowing space for a series of pairs of timber brackets which support the fascia of the main roof. The main roof is pyramidal in form, with a decorative ventilator at its peak.

The side elevations have regularly and symmetrically placed double hung windows and the rear elevation has three sets of windows in staggered positions. A door is located at the rear, below the central window, which allows access to a new toilet block abutting the building.

Internally, walls have been removed on the ground floor to create an open space and partitions have recently been erected around the perimeter of room. Floorboards on the western side of the ground floor have been replaced, and the entire floor has been sanded. The door entering the kitchen at the rear of the ground floor has been extended to form a double-leafed opening, and the stair is enclosed with new partitioning.

The staircase has a highly decorative cedar balustrade and is located at the rear of the building, opposite the entrance. A door allows access to the rear of the site, where a toilet block is located adjacent to the building.

The ceilings throughout are timber boarded, with suspended track lighting on the ground floor and suspended fluorescent lighting and fans on the upper floor. All outer walls are plastered, whilst the internal walls are either of timber boards, horizontally laid, or sheeted with fibro.

The first floor comprises a central room at the top of the stairs, with access to rooms on either side. Double leafed doors open from the central room into a larger room which runs the width of the building. This room is a large open space with symmetrically placed windows and doors and a pressed metal cornice. A set of double leafed doors opening onto the verandah are centrally located within the front wall.

== Heritage listing ==
Gympie School of Arts was listed on the Queensland Heritage Register on 23 April 1999 having satisfied the following criteria.

The place is important in demonstrating the evolution or pattern of Queensland's history.

The Gympie School of Arts was constructed in 1904. It is one of many School of Arts constructed throughout Queensland in the nineteenth and early twentieth centuries as part of an attempt to promote mental and moral improvement of the working classes. By the 1900s, almost every town in Queensland had a School of Arts and they were often seen as indicators of the prosperity or status of the town. As such, they demonstrate the evolution of Queensland's history.

The place demonstrates rare, uncommon or endangered aspects of Queensland's cultural heritage.

The building is an uncommon example of a School of Arts of masonry construction in the Queensland vernacular style.

The place is important in demonstrating the principal characteristics of a particular class of cultural places.

The place demonstrates the principal characteristics of a building of its type, with provision for a reading room, library and games rooms. The inclusion of a verandah is also common to the design of Schools of Arts in Queensland. Most Schools of Arts in Queensland were of timber construction, with few substantial masonry buildings.

The place is important because of its aesthetic significance.

The Gympie School of Arts is of aesthetic significance due to its simplicity and symmetry of design, and for its contribution to the streetscape. Internal features including the balustrading and joinery details also contribute to the overall aesthetic significance of the building.

The place has a strong or special association with a particular community or cultural group for social, cultural or spiritual reasons.

The place has strong associations with the community of Gympie due to its continued use as a library and educational facility. The building ceased to function as a library as recently as 1995.

The place has a special association with the life or work of a particular person, group or organisation of importance in Queensland's history.

The building has special association with prolific local architect Hugo Durietz as an example of one of his more substantial Gympie buildings.
