= National Bank Building =

Coordinates: 26°12′18.3″S 28°2′23.5″E

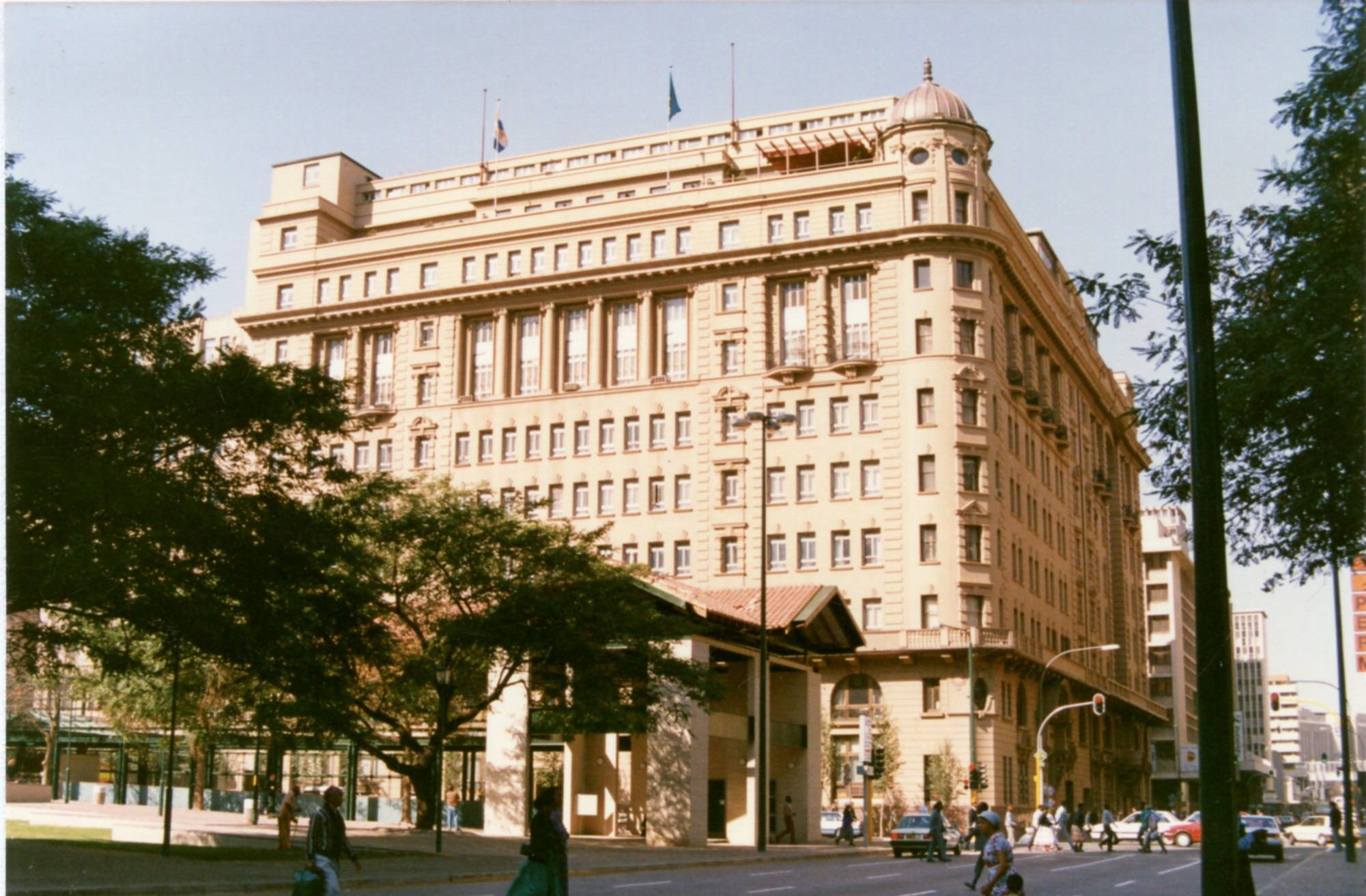
- National Bank Building, cnr Harrison and Commissioner Str Johannesburg
- Interactive map of National Bank Building

General information
- Status: Completed
- Type: Business-use
- Location: Johannesburg, South Africa, Simmonds str
- Completed: 1904

Technical details
- Floor count: 11

Design and construction
- Architects: Leck & Emly

The National Bank Building also known as the Corner House is situated on the corner of Market and Simmonds Streets in Johannesburg. The address 38-40 Simmonds Street corresponds to Stand 205 F.

It was designed by renowned architects Leck and Emley in 1903, and construction was completed in 1904. Leck and Emley also designed the neighbouring Corner House building in 1902, which was finished in 1904 on the corner of Simmonds and Commissioner Streets. The facade of the new National Bank Building blended well with that of the Corner House, and it is believed that J.B.Taylor, chairman of Corner House as well as a director of the National Bank, proposed the plan of combining the two.

Fifty years later, in 1953, the bank (now Barclays) duplicated Taylor's thinking, and Gordon Leith was commissioned to design the third part of the building – the Market Street extension – in keeping with the two existing structures to form a cohesive unit.

It was refurbished by the current owners, Barclays Bank.

== History ==
Before the National Bank Building was built, the site on Simmonds Street had been owned by several different organisations, including the Beaconsfield Hotel in 1889, Baldwin Chambers in 1890, National Bank of the Z.A.R. in 1892, Chamber of Mines in 1894, and in 1899 the New Court Building.

The building was altered by architects G. Leith & Partners in 1953-56, to gain two further storeys and additions were created on Stands 750 and 751. The additional floors were designed in such a way as to respect the original building and to create a harmonious facade. In 2004, the National Bank House was purchased from First Rand (or First National Bank) by Urban Ocean Property Developers (PTY)LTD. This privately owned company took a long term view on the history of Johannesburg inner city as the financial capital of the African continent (or the "City of Gold"), and undertook to start a rejuvenation process in the 'Financial District' of Johannesburg. They secured the filming of Trump's "The Apprentice" and created a luxury penthouse apartment of over 8000 sq.ft on the top floor of the National Bank House, thereby creating renewed interest in the old city. Today the National Bank House is once again fully tenanted with high-end colleges, law firms, accountants and other professionals. The old Banking Mall on the ground floor of the building is a popular venue for high-end functions from nearby banks, government and product launches.

== Design ==
The building is in late Victorian Neo-Classical style with an attractive copper dome on the corner. A glass dome spans over the banking hall, creating a bright and airy interior below. The rest of the roof scape is formed from a flat concrete slab. In the same vein as the building design, the interiors are also carefully proportioned and include fittings executed with a high level of craftsmanship, such as panelling and parquet flooring. A mahogany counter with bronze metal screens was fitted by J H Ross and Company (Pty) Limited.

== Heritage Status ==
The National Bank Building was declared a national monument by the PHRAG and is historically and culturally significant for the following reasons:

- The National Bank Building is a building of high architectural quality
- It was the highest office block in the City until the 1920s, making it a very prominent and landmark building in Johannesburg CBD
- It is an outstanding example of a building where additions made 50 years later blend sympathetically with the original building
- The National Bank Building forms a grouping with the Old Corner House
- The National Bank Building is associated with Leck and Emley, two renowned architects working in Johannesburg at that time
- The National Bank Building survives in good condition and as such its significance has been retained
- It is of sufficient age to qualify as a heritage building
