= Bank of Queensland =

Australian financial institution

- Trade name: BOQ
- Formerly: Brisbane Permanent Benefit Building and Investment Society (1874–1970)
- Type: Public (since 1971)
- Traded as: ASX: BOQ
- Industry: Banking; Financial services
- Founded: 1874; 152 years ago
- Headquarters: 100 Skyring Terrace, Newstead, Brisbane, Queensland
- Number of locations: 2,447+ (Note: Including ATMs, branches and third party intermediaries.) (2022)
- Area served: Queensland
- Products: Retail banking; Commercial bank; Financial services; Mortgage loan; Credit card
- Net income: ▲ A$1.682 billion (2022)
- Total assets: ▲ A$99.930 billion (2022)
- Total equity: ▲ A$6.685 billion (2022)
- Number of employees: 3,040
- Subsidiaries: Virgin Money Australia; ME Bank
- Rating: S&P Global Ratings: Short-term: A2; Long-term: BBB+
- Website: www.boq.com.au

The Bank of Queensland (BOQ), formerly known as the Brisbane Permanent Benefit Building and Investment Society (BPBBIS) between 1874 and 1970, is an Australian retail bank with headquarters in Brisbane, Queensland. The bank is one of the oldest financial institutions in Queensland, having begun as a building society. It previously had 111 owner-managed branches throughout Australia, including thirty-six corporate branches and third-party intermediaries. They also have over 2,300 ATMs. The bank also owns Virgin Money Australia and ME Bank.

In 2021, customer satisfaction with BOQ was rated at 82.9% by Roy Morgan. In 2007 customer satisfaction levels were placed at 88%. The bank does not currently have any board directors who are based in Queensland.

== History ==
A Bank of Queensland was established in 1863. It collapsed in 1866 closing its doors in the severe financial depression known as the Panic of 1866. Another bank took the same name in 1917 but disappeared into the National Bank in 1922.

The current Bank of Queensland was established in 1874 as The Brisbane Permanent Benefit Building and Investment Society. It was incorporated in 1887. It amalgamated with City and Suburban Building Society in 1921 and with Queensland Deposit Bank a decade later. It remained a savings bank come building society until a trading bank licence was obtained in 1942 in the name of Brisbane Building and Banking Company.

Brisbane Building and Banking Company changed its name to Bank of Queensland (BOQ) on 1 May 1970 and was listed on the Australian Securities Exchange in 1971. Its operations were computerised in 1970.

Bank of Queensland incorporated Bank of Queensland Savings Bank as a wholly owned subsidiary in 1982. In 1991 BOQ acquired Stowe Electronic Switching Pty Ltd and renamed it Queensland Electronic Switching Pty Ltd.

In 1999, Bank of Hawaii bought 5.8 m shares (approx. 10%) in Bank of Queensland. Two years later Bank of Hawaii sold its 6.2 m shares and 5.4 m convertible notes in Bank of Queensland to refocus on its operations in Hawaii.

In 2002, the Bank launched the tagline "bank different" which was to be their branding until 2011.

BOQ acquired the equipment financing business of UFJ Bank in Australia and New Zealand in 2003. The bank also acquired ATM Solutions.

Between 2001 and 2004, BOQ accelerated its branch opening program, opening 55 new branches throughout Queensland and then branches in New South Wales, Victoria, and the Australian Capital Territory in 2004.The following year BOQ acquired the $78 million debtor finance division of Orix Australia. In 2006 the bank acquired Queensland-based Pioneer Permanent Building Society with full integration completed in November 2007.

The bank opened branches in the Northern Territory and Western Australia in 2006 and then merged with Western Australia-based Home Building Society and the Queensland-based Mackay Permanent Building Society in 2007.

In 2010, BOQ joined the rediATM network, and purchased St Andrew's Insurance. St Andrew's is an Australian manufacturer of consumer credit insurance products. It also acquired the Australian and New Zealand divisions of CIT Group Inc, a supplier of vendor finance to small businesses and middle market companies. In that year, BOQ launched a new slogan "Your own personal bank" which was replaced in 2013.

In 2011, the bank experienced a profit slump due to lending losses from the 2010–11 Queensland floods.

In 2013 BOQ bought Virgin Money Australia for $40 million. Under the deal, BOQ has rights to the Virgin Money name in Australia for four decades while paying royalties to the Virgin Group, and Virgin has a seat on the BOQ board.

BOQ launched a new branding in 2013 – “It’s possible to love a bank".

BOQ launched a new five-year five pillar strategy focused on growth and digitisation in February 2020. This included reducing some of the 220 banking products it offered and reducing processing times to counter underperformance

In January 2021, BOQ was given approval by the Australian Competition & Consumer Commission to purchase ME Bank for $A1.3 billion raised through an underwritten capital raising of $A1.35 billion. Half of the Bank of Queensland's customers are in Queensland with another 30% split across New South Wales and Western Australia. One third of ME Bank's with another 47% based in New South Wales and Queensland. Combined, the group will have pro forma total assets over $88 billion, with total deposits of more than $56 billion. The ME brand will be maintained together with BOQ and Virgin Money. The purchase was approved by the Treasurer of Australia in June 2021, with the sale expected to be completed on 1 July 2021.

In October 2021, BOQ sold its St Andrew's Insurance business to Farmcove Investment Holdings for $23 million.

In August 2024, BOQ announced it would make up to 400 employees redundant and end its franchise model, moving to a corporate-owned branch structure by March 2025.

== Franchise model ==
The BOQ chose a franchise model as a key part of its expansion nationally across Australia in the early 2000s. Many of the bank's branches are run as franchises, under which the bank pays franchisees commissions on the loans they generate, the deposits they source and other products they retail. BOQ calls the franchisees "Owner Managers", and selects small business owners who have strong community relationships to set up a local branch in a suburb or town. BOQ's stated aim was to offer "communities the security of a national bank combined with local know-how" and a personal banker.

The branch owner is responsible for employing and managing the branch staff and all other operating costs associated with running the business whilst operating according to BOQ's policies and procedures. BOQ is responsible for overall brand, policy, product, and operations. Owner Managers were eligible for a series of rewards including BMW car and travel vouchers.

Following the 2011 loss, the BOQ reduced its branch network which included taking control of some of the franchise branches and buying the branch owners out.

BOQ experienced a series of litigation actions between 2014 and 2016 by some franchise owners who believed that they had been unfairly treated.

Two of BOQ's Victorian franchisees sued the bank in the Supreme Court of Victoria in 2014, claiming senior bank management forced them out of business. In 2013, the bank terminated the franchise agreement with the owner-managers of its Geelong West branch in Victoria and used police and security guards to prevent them entering their branch.

In 2014, BOQ won a large class action proceeding in the Supreme Court of New South Wales. In this case, the Bank successfully defended claims of misleading and deceptive conduct, unconscionable conduct and negligence brought by eleven franchisees who claimed loss and damage caused by the failure of their franchise branches. In 2015, the NSW Court of Appeal rejected the claimants' appeal.

During the Royal Commission into Misconduct in the Banking, Superannuation and Financial Services Industry, the banks franchise model was scrutinised.

In February 2020, the CEO stated that as part of a new five year strategy, that owner-manager branches would continue to be an important and growing part of the business.

In August 2024, BOQ announced it would buy all owner-managed branches and convert them to corporate branches by March 2025. CEO Patrick Allaway said "The current operating model and structure is not sustainable for us."

Notable former franchisees include Simon Black, Mark Bartholomeusz and Ben Tune.

== Involvement with Storm Financial ==
In 2010, it was found that one of the Townsville branches of the Bank of Queensland was giving loans to clients of the collapsed Storm Financial. Australian Securities & Investments Commission undertook compensation suits on behalf of Storm Financial clients against the BOQ.

== Awards ==
BOQ was inducted into the Queensland Business Leaders Hall of Fame in 2014, in recognition of its excellence in providing banking services to Queensland for over a century and its continuing expansion nationally.

== See also ==
- Banking in Australia
- List of banks in Australia
- Financial system in Australia
