= Royal Bank of Queensland =

Australian (trading) bank

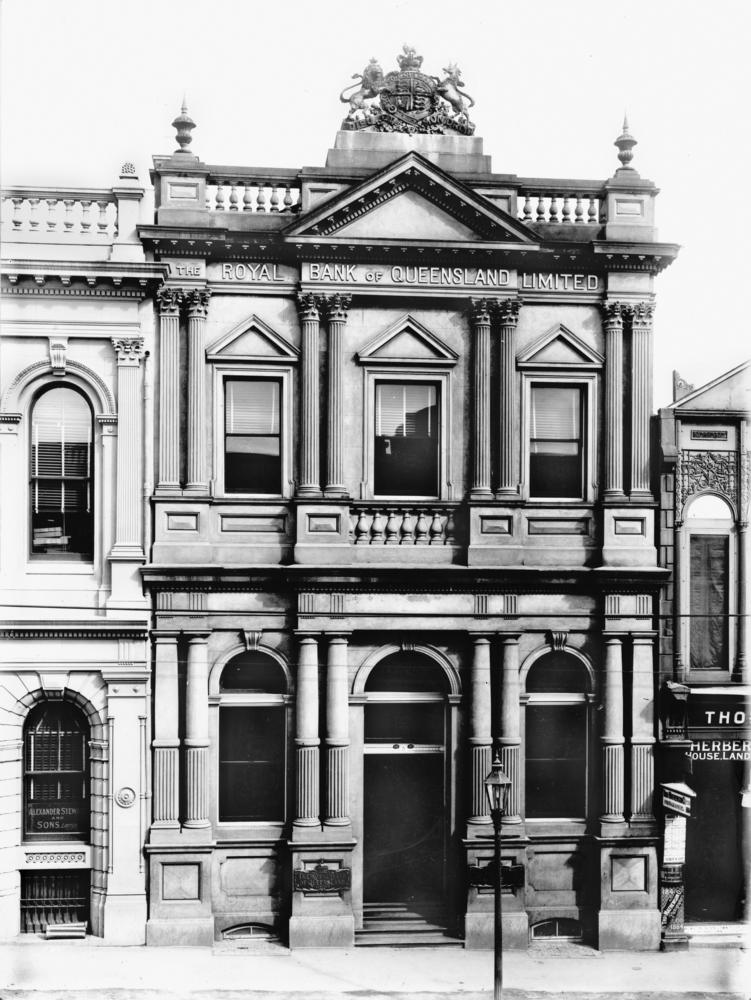
Royal Bank of Queensland, Queen St, Brisbane, ca. 1900

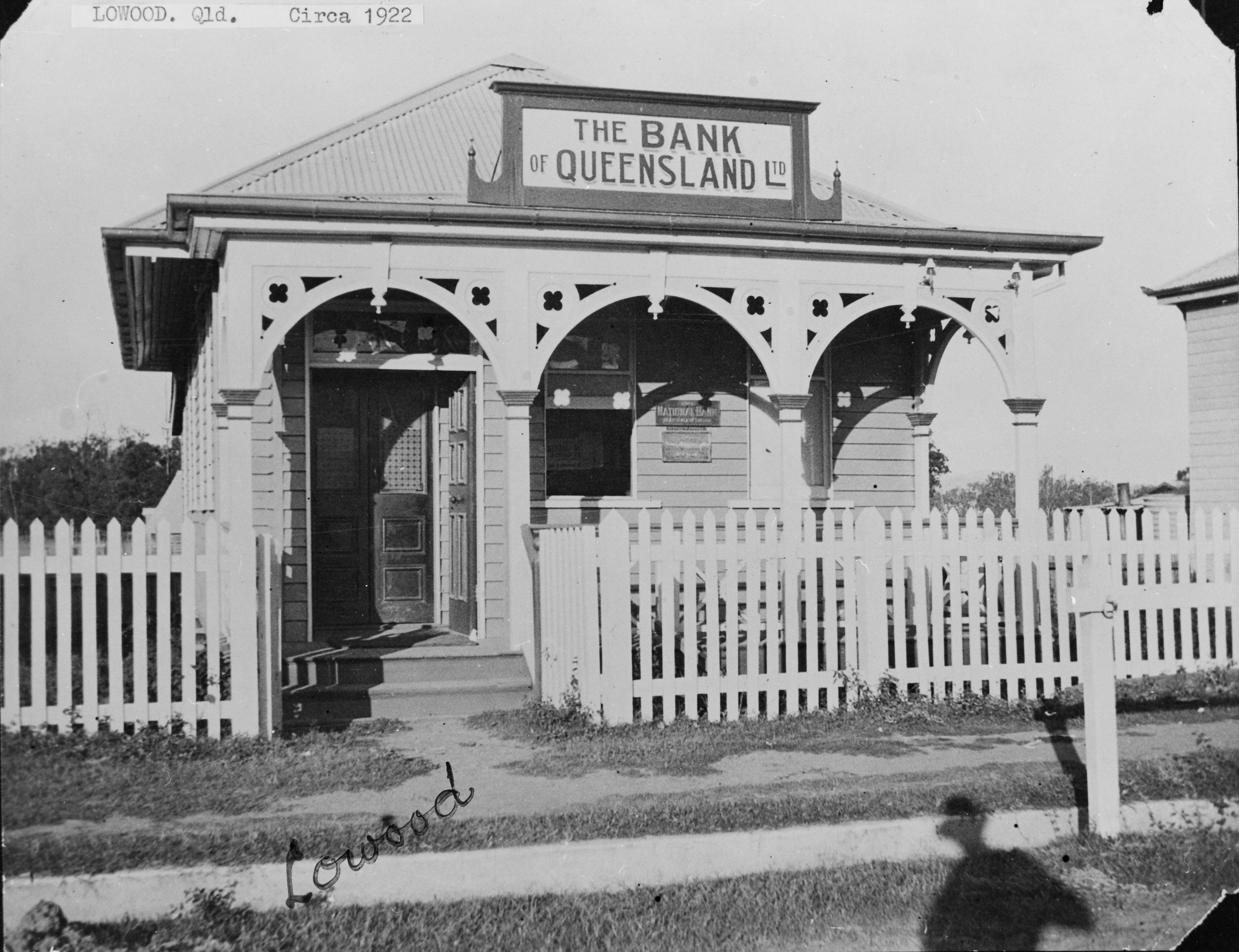
Royal Bank of Queensland, in Lowood, after merger in 1922

The Royal Bank of Queensland was a bank in Queensland, Australia.

== History ==
The Royal Bank of Queensland commenced operation in Brisbane in February 1886.

In 1917, it merged with the Bank of North Queensland creating the Bank of Queensland. In 1922, the Bank of Queensland merged with the National Bank of Australasia.

== Head Office ==
The early head office was built in 1891 at 180 Queen Street. However, the original building was replaced in 1929–30 by the successor company; the replacement is a heritage-listed building of the (now) National Australia Bank.

== Heritage listings ==
A number of former Royal Bank of Queensland buildings are still standing and are now heritage listed, including:

- Royal Bank of Queensland, Gympie
- Royal Bank of Queensland, Helidon
- Royal Bank of Queensland, Lowood
- Royal Bank of Queensland, Maryborough
