= Bank of North Queensland =

Australian (trading) bank

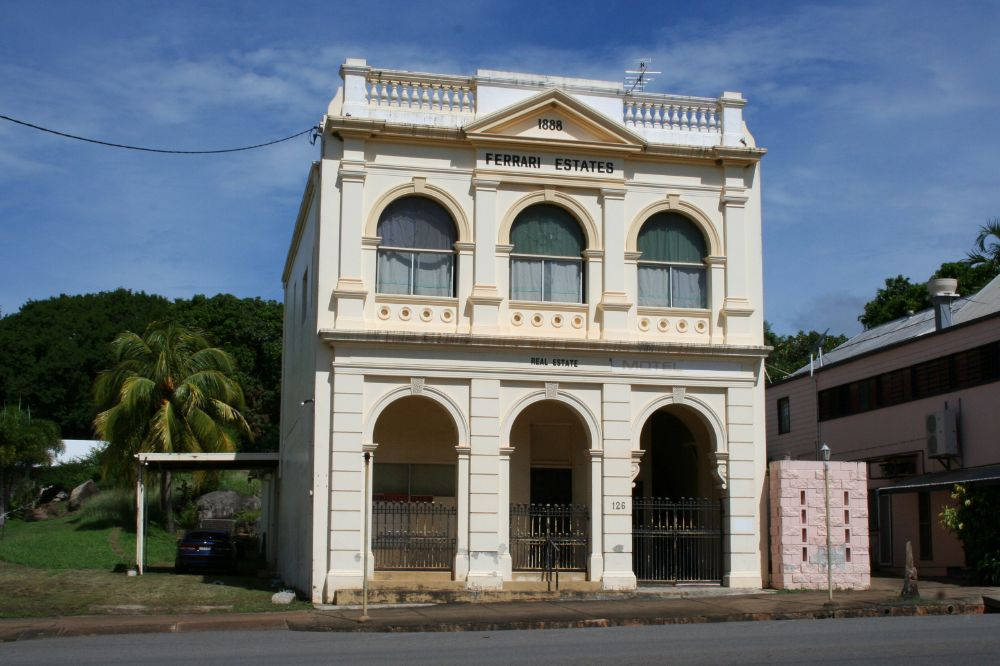
- Bank of North Queensland Cooktown branch 2010
- Industry: Banking
- Founded: 1887
- Defunct: 1917
- Fate: Merged with the Royal Bank of Queensland to form the Bank of Queensland
- Successor: Bank of Queensland
- Headquarters: Townsville, Queensland, Australia
- Area served: Queensland; New South Wales; United Kingdom
- Services: Financial services

The Bank of North Queensland was formed in 1887 in Townsville with branches in Sydney and London.

In 1893 there were branches in: Ayr, Cairns, Charters Towers, Cooktown, Herberton, Normanton, Rockhampton and Thursday Island and agencies at Mareeba, Limestone, and Muldiva. London agents, the London and Westminster Bank. In 1910 it had branches in Northern, Central, and Southern Queensland, including Atherton, Childers and Warwick. There were also branches in the New England area of New South Wales and the vicinity of Sydney, and Agencies throughout Australasia, Great Britain, America, and the East.

In 1917, the Bank of North Queensland merged with The Royal Bank of Queensland to form the Bank of Queensland.
