= National Bank of Australasia =

National Bank of Australasia Limited
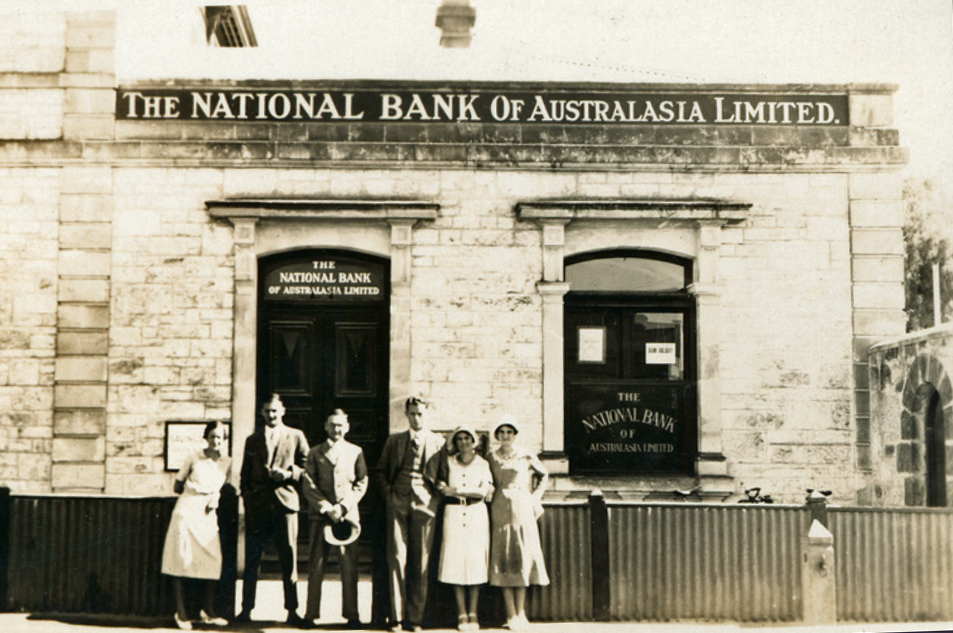
- National Bank of Australasia, Naracoorte, South Australia in 1931
- Industry: Banking
- Founded: 8 October 1858
- Defunct: 1982
- Fate: Merger with Commercial Banking Company of Sydney
- Successor: National Australia Bank
- Headquarters: Melbourne, Australia

The National Bank of Australasia was a bank based in Melbourne. It was established in 1857, and in 1982 merged with the Commercial Banking Company of Sydney to form National Australia Bank.

== History ==
In 1857, Alexander Gibb, a Melbourne gentleman, enlisted Andrew Cruickshank, a local merchant and pastoralist, to raise the capital to establish National Bank of Australasia with headquarters in Melbourne. The prospectus was published on 18 November 1857. The legal work establishing the bank was performed by a predecessor of King & Wood Mallesons. Cruickshank became its first chairman while Gibb left after being passed over for the position of General Manager. Prior to the opening of the bank, several shareholders took an unsuccessful action in the colony's Supreme Court claiming that Cruikshank and several other directors had been appointed illegally. The first branch opened in Melbourne on 8 October 1858. The bank was incorporated by the Colony of Victoria on 24 February 1859.

The bank opened its first branch in the Colony of South Australia the same year. The building, located in King William Street, Adelaide, was designed by E. J. Woods (later, co-founder of Woods Bagot) and erected in 1864–1865. Expansion to other Australian colonies followed, with branches opening in Tasmania (1859), Western Australia (1866), New South Wales (1885), and finally in the state of Queensland in 1920.

An early branch established in Mauritius (1859) closed within a year, but a London branch (1864) was established to handle financing and payment for Australian exports of wool, gold and other commodities, and imports to Australia, was more successful.

National Bank of Australasia was one of many banks that closed its doors during the banking crisis of 1893. Director John Grice was active in the crisis, from which the bank re-emerged as a public limited company, incorporated on 23 June 1893.

For the next half century, growth was stimulated by a number of acquisitions:

- Colonial Bank of Australasia (est. 1856) in 1918, bringing additional branches in Victoria and New South Wales.
- Bank of Queensland in 1922, with branches in Queensland, New South Wales and Victoria. The Bank of Queensland was itself result of the merger in 1917 of Royal Bank of Queensland (est. 1886) and Bank of North Queensland (est. 1888).
- Queensland National Bank (est. 1872) in 1948, with branches in Queensland, New South Wales and Victoria.
- Ballarat Banking Company (est. 1865) in 1955

The bank opened a representative office in Tokyo, Japan, in 1946, later upgraded to a branch in 1985. The bank's overseas interest expanded more rapidly in the 1970s. It opened a branch in Singapore in 1971, and representative offices in Jakarta (1973) and Hong Kong (1974). It took minority interests in merchant banks in these locations at the same time, and in Hong Kong established a 50–50 joint venture merchant bank with Mitsubishi Bank and Trust, but withdrew from these arrangements in 1984. Its first US presence was established in 1977 with a branch and an agency in Los Angeles that closed in 1993.

== Arms ==
Coat of arms of National Bank of Australasia
Notes Granted 27 September 1954. Escutcheon Gyronny of six Argent and Or a cross couped Gules charged with five mullets of the first.
