= List of Westpac buildings =

This list of Westpac buildings includes a number of notable (often heritage-listed) buildings, currently or formerly used by the Westpac Bank or its predecessor institutions including Bank of New South Wales.

== New South Wales ==
- Westpac Place, Sydney

== Queensland ==
- Bank of New South Wales building, Brisbane
- Bank of New South Wales building, Charters Towers
- Westpac Bank Building, Cooktown
- Bank of New South Wales building, Helidon
- Bank of New South Wales building, Gympie
- Bank of New South Wales building, Maryborough
- Westpac Bank building, Normanton
- Bank of New South Wales building, Townsville
- Bank of New South Wales building, Yungaburra

== South Australia ==
- Westpac House, Adelaide

== Victoria ==
- Bank of New South Wales building, Melbourne
