= Gail Kelly =

South African-born Australian businesswoman

- Born: Gail Currer; 25 April 1956 (age 70); Pretoria, South Africa
- Citizenship: Australia
- Education: University of Cape Town; University of the Witwatersrand
- Occupation: Financial business executive
- Known for: Former CEO of Westpac
- Board member of: UBS
- Spouse: Allan Kelly (m. 1977)
- Children: 4

Gail Kelly (née Currer; born 25 April 1956) is a South African-born Australian businesswoman. In 2002, she became the first female CEO of a major Australian bank or top 15 company, and in 2005 was the highest-paid woman in an Australian corporation. She is the former CEO of Westpac, a role she held from 2008 to 2015. In 2010 Kelly was named 8th most powerful woman in the world by Forbes; in 2014, she was listed in 56th place.

== Early life and education ==
Gail Currer was born in Pretoria, South Africa. Currer attended the University of Cape Town where she undertook an arts degree, majoring in history and Latin, as well as a Diploma in Education.

She married Allan Kelly in December 1977. They have four children, including triplets.

== Career ==
=== Teacher ===
The couple moved to Rhodesia (now Zimbabwe), where she taught Latin at Falcon College while he served in the Rhodesian Army. They returned to South Africa, where Allan Kelly studied medicine at the University of the Witwatersrand and Gail Kelly taught at a government high school.

=== Banking ===
Kelly started work at the Nedcor Bank in 1980 as a teller but was fast-tracked into an accelerated training program. She started an MBA at Wits Business School, the graduate school of business administration of the University of the Witwatersrand in 1986 while pregnant with her oldest daughter and graduated with distinction in 1987. In 1990, she became head of human resources at Nedcor (after having given birth to triplets five months earlier). From early 1992 to 1997 she held various other general manager positions at Nedcor, including cards and personal banking.

Kelly and her family, like many white South Africans, became disillusioned with South Africa following the end of apartheid and sought to emigrate. In June 1997, she flew to Sydney, Australia, where she interviewed with four of the major banks; by July 1997, she had been appointed to a senior position at the Commonwealth Bank.

Kelly started work as the General Manager of Strategic Marketing in the Commonwealth Bank in October 1997. By 2002, she was head of the Customer Service Division responsible for running the Commonwealth Bank's extensive branch network.

Her performance at the Commonwealth Bank led her to be recruited as CEO of St. George Bank (after the death of the incumbent CEO from a heart attack). She commenced in January 2002 – at the time, St. George was seen as a possible takeover target (especially after the purchase of Colonial State Bank by the Commonwealth Bank) but Kelly increased the bank's profitability and achieved much higher levels on return on assets. In November 2004, St. George Bank gave Kelly a pay rise and extended her contract indefinitely with the capitalisation of the bank having risen by $3 billion since the start of her term as CEO. The Australian Banking & Finance magazine gave her an award for Best Financial Services Executive in 2003 and 2004.

Due to her success at St George, there was extensive media speculation in June 2005 that she would return to the Commonwealth Bank as CEO on the retirement of David Murray AO, but Kelly said that she was committed to remaining with St. George. Murray was replaced by Ralph Norris, the former CEO and managing director of Air New Zealand.

On Friday 17 August 2007, she announced her resignation as CEO of St. George Bank to take up the same position in Westpac from 2008. She started work as Westpac CEO on 1 February 2008.

On 12 May 2008 Kelly announced an $18.6 billion merger between Westpac and St. George Bank. The merger was approved by the Federal Court of Australia and finalised on 26 May 2008. The merger resulted in the new combined Westpac Group having 10 million customers, a 25% share of the Australian home loans market and with $108 billion investment funds under its administration.

In October 2010, Kelly announced a target to have women occupy 40% of the top 4000 managerial positions at Westpac, a task reported by The Australian newspaper to have been almost achieved by March 2012.

On 13 November 2014, Kelly announced that she would retire as CEO of the Westpac Group on 1 February 2015. Brian Hartzer, the head of Westpac's Australian financial services group, was appointed as her replacement.

Kelly joined the board of UBS in 2024.

== Book ==
In August 2017, Kelly's memoir, Live Lead Learn: My Stories of Life and Leadership was published by Viking. The book details her experiences of being a high-profile businesswoman and a mother of four.

== Impact and influence ==
In 2010 Kelly was named 8th most powerful woman in the world by Forbes; in 2014, she was listed was 56th place.

=== Ranking ===
Forbes - Most Powerful Women in the World

Year	Ranking	Related article
2014	56	
2013	62	
2012	60	
2011	32	
2010	8	
2009	18	
2008	11	

Fortune - Various

Year	Title	Ranking	Related article
2014	The World's 50 Greatest Leaders	49	
2014	Most Powerful Women of Asia-Pacific	1	
2014	50 Most Powerful Women – Global Edition	10	
2013	50 Most Powerful Women in Business: The Global 50	3	
2012	50 Most Powerful Women in Business – Global List	2	
2011	International Power 50	2	
2010	50 Most Powerful Women – International Power 50	2	
2009	50 Most Powerful Women in Business – Global List	2	
2008	50 Most Powerful Women in Business – Global List	2	
2007	50 Most Powerful Women: The Global Power 50	28	

Financial Times

Year	Title	Ranking
2011	The Top 50 Women in World Business	12
2010	The Top 50 Women in World Business	17

The Australian Financial Review/Boss Magazine

Year	Title	Ranking
2010	True Leaders: Staying Power	No rank
2008	AFR Magazine List: Sectoral Power: Financial Services	2
2007	AFR Boss True Leaders – Hall of Fame	Top 25
2005	AFR Boss True Leaders	No rank
2004	AFR Magazine List: Sectoral Power: Financial Services	No rank
2003	AFR Boss True Leaders List	No rank

Other Australian newspapers

Year	Title	Ranking
Feb 2015	The Australian's Deal Magazine – 50 Most Powerful Women in Australian Business	40
March 2013	The Australian Newspaper – List of the 50 Most Influential People in Politics	46
2011	The Sydney Morning Herald – 50 Women of Influence	n/a
2003	Daily Telegraph – Sydney's Most Powerful Operators	n/a

Other publications

Year	Title	Ranking	Related article
2014	Morningstar – CEO of the Year	Joint runner-up	
2014	Australian Women Online – Power List	4	
2013	Crikey – Power 50 Index	20	
2011	Insto Magazine – Banker of the Year	1	
2010	Australian Women's Weekly – 6 Women of Influence	No rank	
2007	Bulletin Magazine – 50 Most Influential in Business	9	
2007	Australian Women's Weekly – List of the 10 Most Powerful Women	No rank	
2005	Australian Banking & Finance Magazine – Best Financial Services Executive	1	
2004	Bulletin Magazine – Smartest People List	'Heads up the business category...’ with Chip Goodyear.	
2004	Australian Banking & Finance Magazine – Best Financial Services Executive	1	
2003	Australian Banking & Finance Magazine – Best Financial Services Executive	1	
2002	Business Review Weekly – Top 20 Most Powerful Women in Australian Business	4	

Business positions
Preceded by Edward Asbury O'Neal	Chief Executive Officer of St.George Bank; 2002 – 2007	Succeeded by Paul Fegan
Preceded by David Morgan	Chief Executive Officer of Westpac Banking Corporation; 2008 – 2015	Succeeded by Brian Hartzer
