= Bank of New South Wales =

Bank in New South Wales, Australia

- Coat of Arms, granted in 1931.
- Industry: Financial services
- Founded: 8 April 1817 in Sydney, Australia
- Founder: Lachlan Macquarie
- Defunct: 4 May 1982
- Fate: Merged with Commercial Bank of Australia
- Successor: Westpac
- Headquarters: Martin Place, Sydney, Australia
- Area served: New South Wales

The Bank of New South Wales (BNSW), also known as the Wales, was the first bank in Australia. It was established in 1817 in Sydney. During the 19th century, the bank opened branches throughout Australia and New Zealand, expanding into Oceania in the 20th century. Throughout it history it merged with and purchased many other financial institutions. In 1981 it merged with the Commercial Bank of Australia and was renamed Westpac on 4 May 1982.

== History ==
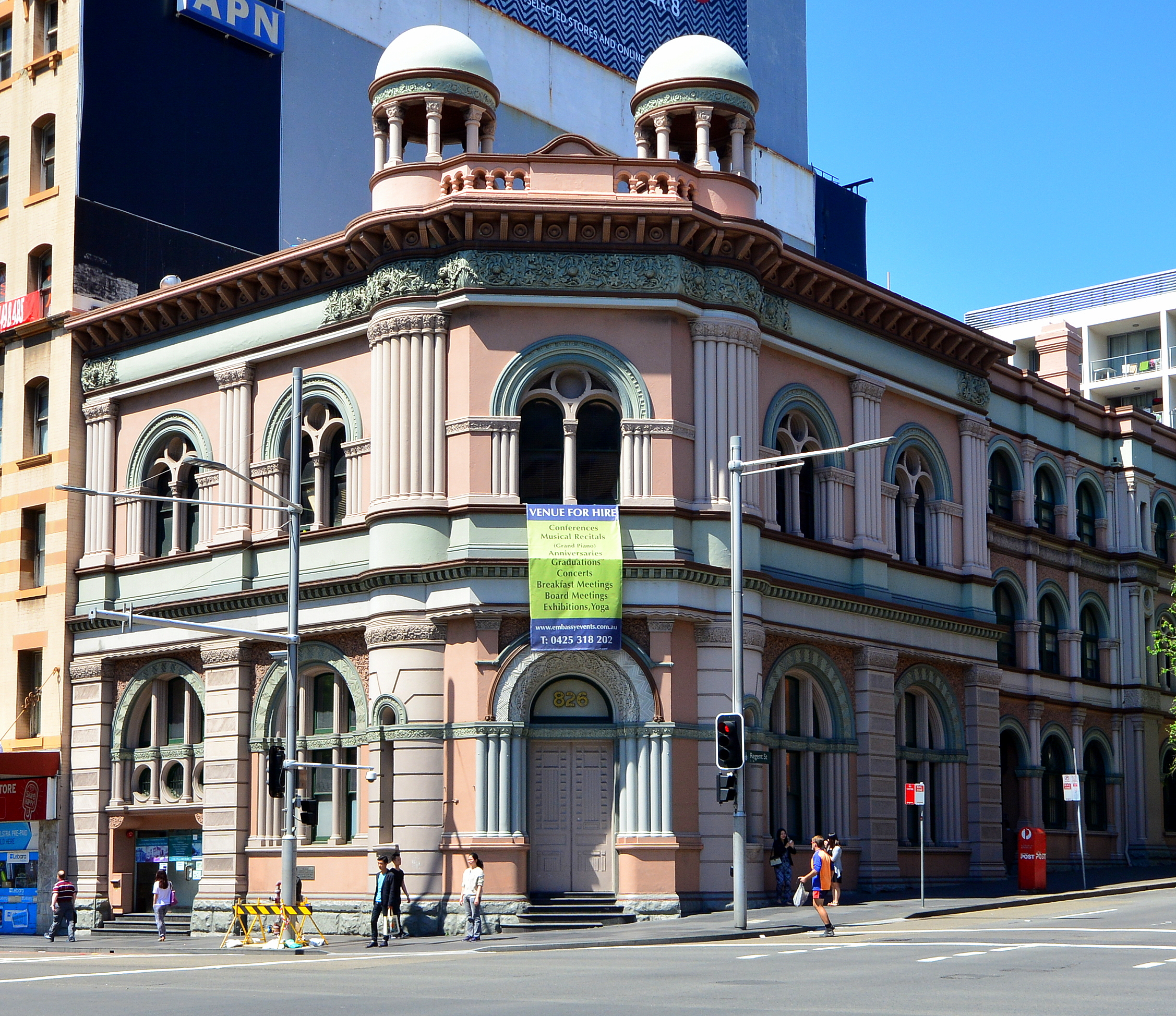
Former Bank of New South Wales, Broadway, Sydney, designed by Varney Parkes

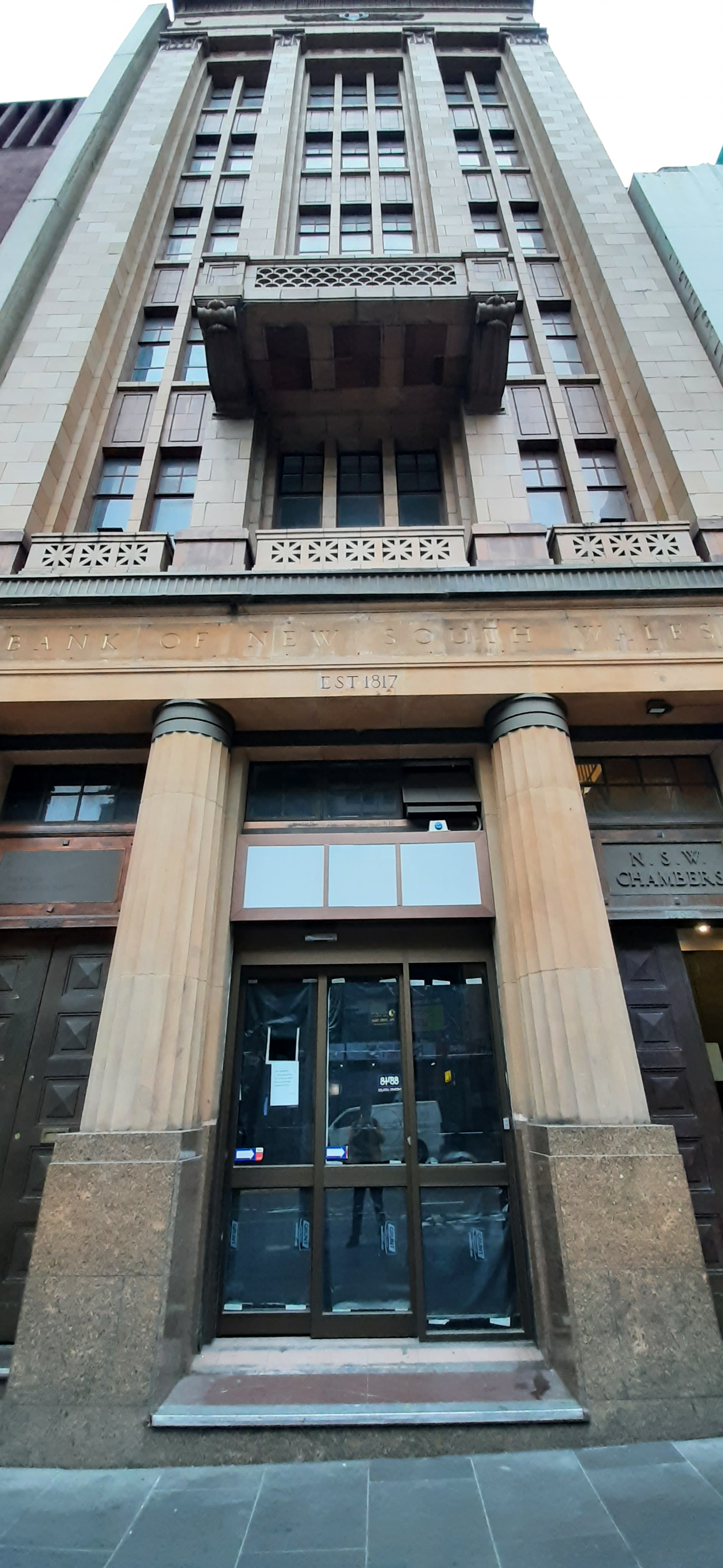
The former Bank of New South Wales building on Russell Street, Melbourne

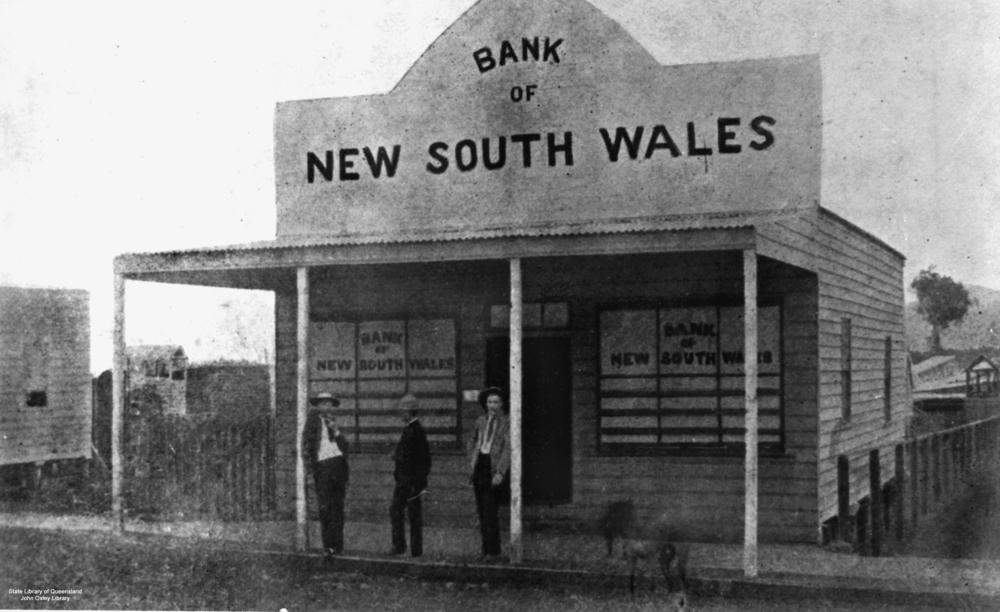
Bank of New South Wales branch in Port Douglas, Queensland circa 1890

Established in 1817 in Macquarie Place, Sydney premises leased from Mary Reibey, the Bank of New South Wales (BNSW) was the first bank in Australia. It was established under the economic regime of Governor Lachlan Macquarie (responsible for transitioning the penal settlement of Sydney into a capitalist economy). At the time, the colony of Sydney had not been supplied with currency, instead barter and promissory notes was the payment method of choice. Governor Macquarie himself used cattle and rum as payment for the construction of Sydney Hospital and the road from Sydney to Liverpool. The suggestion of establishing a bank was raised in March 1810; but it wasn't until November 1816 that a meeting was held to discuss the real possibility of such a proposal. In February 1817 seven directors of the bank were elected: D'Arcy Wentworth, John Harris, Robert Jenkins, Thomas Wylde, (Note: Thomas Wylde / Wilde retired founder of London's solicitors Wilde Sapte) Alexander Riley, William Redfern and John Thomas Campbell. Campbell was elected the bank's first president and Edward Smith Hall as its first cashier and secretary. During the 19th and early 20th century, the bank opened branches throughout Australia and New Zealand and in the 20th century in Oceania. This included at Moreton Bay (Brisbane) in 1850, then in Victoria (1851), New Zealand (1861), South Australia (1877), Western Australia (1883), Fiji (1901), Papua (now part of Papua New Guinea) (1910) and Tasmania (1910).

Besides expanding its branch network, the bank also expanded by acquiring other banks:

- 1927: BNSW acquired the Western Australian Bank, which had been established in 1841 or 1842.
- 1931: BNSW acquired the Australian Bank of Commerce, which had branches in both New South Wales and Queensland.
- 1942: BNSW suspended operations in Papua after the Japanese Army captured many of the towns in which it had branches and agencies, and bombed Port Moresby. It resumed operations in 1946.
- 1946: BNSW resumed operations in Papua.
- 1957: BNSW purchased a 40% shareholding in Australian Guarantee Corporation and over the years progressively increased its interest to a majority stake of 76% and then acquired all remaining shares in 1988.
- 1968: BNSW joined Databank Systems consortium in New Zealand to provide joint data processing services. Around this time the bank started going 'on line' with the use of their computer nicknamed "Fabicus", the letters standing for "First Australian Banking Institution Computer Used in Sydney". Fabicus had been in use since 1958 in the processing of some records. With advanced programming, The use of this computer changed the whole concept of banking as it had been done in years previously with its combination of hand-written and machined records. Branches slowly became attached to the data processing centre and other banks slowly joined the ranks of computer-generated reports, records, and expansion.
- 1970: BNSW established a branch on Tarawa in Kiribati, which also took over the government savings bank. BNSW was publicly listed on the Australian Securities Exchange on 18 July 1970.
- 1973: BNSW became the corporate sponsor of the Rescue Helicopter service started by Surf Life Saving Australia. The service is known today as the Westpac Life Saver Rescue Helicopter Service
- 1974: BNSW participated in a joint venture to establish the Bank of Tonga.
- 1975: BNSW incorporated its local business in Papua New Guinea as Bank of New South Wales (PNG).
- 1977: BNSW formed the Pacific Commercial Bank in Samoa as a joint venture with the Bank of Hawaii, buying into Pacific Savings and Loan Company, in which the Bank of Hawaii had had an ownership interest since 1971.
- 1981: BNSW merged with the Commercial Bank of Australia. The Parliament of New South Wales passed the Bank of New South Wales (Change of Name) Act 1982 on 4 May 1982, changing the name of BNSW to Westpac. The new brand incorporates the "W" motif, which had been the logo of BNSW.

== Executive leadership ==
=== Chief executive ===
- Alfred Davidson – General manager (1929–1945)
- Robert Norman – General manager (1964–1977)
- Bob White – Chief general manager (1977–1982)

=== President/Chairman ===
(Note: In 200:The Westpac Story on page 296 there is a chronological list of presidents of the Bank of New South Wales 1817-1982 followed by a list of chairmen of Westpac Banking Corporation 1982–2017.)

Ordinal	Name	Title	Term start	Term end	Time in office	Notes
1	John Thomas Campbell	President	1817	1821	3–4 years	
2	John Piper	President	1822	January 1827	4–5 years	
3	John Holden	President	1851	1852	0–1 years	
4	Daniel Cooper	President	1855	1861	5–6 years	
5	Robert Tooth	President	1862	1863	0–1 years	
6	Robert Towns	President	1866	1867	0–1 years	
7	Frederick Tooth	President	1868	1869	0–1 years	
8	Thomas Walker	President	1869	1886	16–17 years	
9	Thomas Buckland	President	1886	1894	7–8 years	
10	James Richard Hill	President	1894	1898	3–4 years	
11	James Walker	President	1898	1901	0–1 years	
12	Charles Mackellar	President	1901	1922	20–21 years	
13	Thomas Buckland	President	1922	1937	14–15 years	
14	Robert Gillespie	President	1937	1945	7–8 years	
15	Frederick Tout	President	1945	1950	4–5 years	
16	Martin McIlrath	President	1950	1952	1–2 years	
17	Colin Sinclair	President	1952	1954	1–2 years	
18	Leslie Morshead	President	1954	1959	4–5 years	
19	John Cadwallader	President	1959	1978	18–19 years	
20	Noel Foley	Chairman	1978	1982	3–4 years	

== Coat of arms ==
In 1931 the bank was granted a coat of arms from the College of Arms, symbolising the 1927 acquisition of the Western Australian Bank. The arms featured an emu and a black swan (which is symbolic of Western Australia) rampant supporting a shield surmounted by a kangaroo and the emblem of the rising sun. On the shield are shown a ship, two sheaves of wheat, a sheep, a cow, and a crossed pick and spade, representing the principal industries of Australia at the time: pastoral, agricultural, mining and shipping. The motto included was "Sic fortis Etruria crevit", translated as "Thus strong Etruria prospered", a line taken from Virgil's Second Georgic and an early motto of the Colony of New South Wales.

These arms replaced the original arms known as the "Advance Australia Arms" which was similar to the first Coat of arms of Australia used until 1910, using the same kangaroo and emu supporters and the motto "Advance Australia". The shield in these arms was retained in the 1931 arms.

Coat of arms of Bank of New South Wales

Crest
On a Wreath of the Colours in front of a Sun rising a Kangaroo Or.
Escutcheon
Per chevron Azure and Argent in chief a Fleece and Bull statant of the last in base a Miner's Pick and Shovel in saltire the heads upwards Proper on a Chief Ermine between two Garbs an ancient Ship with one mast, Sail hoisted, Pennon and Flag flying, all Or.
Supporters
On a Compartment Vert to the dexter an Emu Proper to the sinister a Swan wings addorsed and inverted Sable the tip Feathers Argent beaked and legged Gules.
Motto
Sic Fortis Etruria Crevit

== Heritage-listed buildings ==
The Bank of New South Wales built many buildings in Australia, some of which survive and are heritage-listed. However, very few are still used as banks. Surviving buildings with heritage listing include:

=== New South Wales ===
- 341 George Street, former Sydney Head Office (1927–1932).
- 107–109 Bathurst Street, Sydney (1895).
- 51 Mount Street, North Sydney (1931).
- 306 Pacific Highway, Crows Nest (1924).
- 264 Church Street, Parramatta, Sydney (current branch)
- 18 King Street, Sydney (1912)

=== Queensland ===
- Bank of New South Wales Building, Brisbane
- Bank of New South Wales Building, Charters Towers
- Bank of New South Wales Building, Gympie
- Bank of New South Wales Building, Helidon
- Bank of New South Wales Building, Maryborough
- Bank of New South Wales Building, Normanton (currently operates as a branch of Westpac Bank)
- Bank of New South Wales Building, Townsville
- Bank of New South Wales Building, Yungaburra

=== Victoria ===
- Melbourne Head Office (building demolished with the façade preserved and relocated within the University of Melbourne, Parkville campus)

== Gallery ==
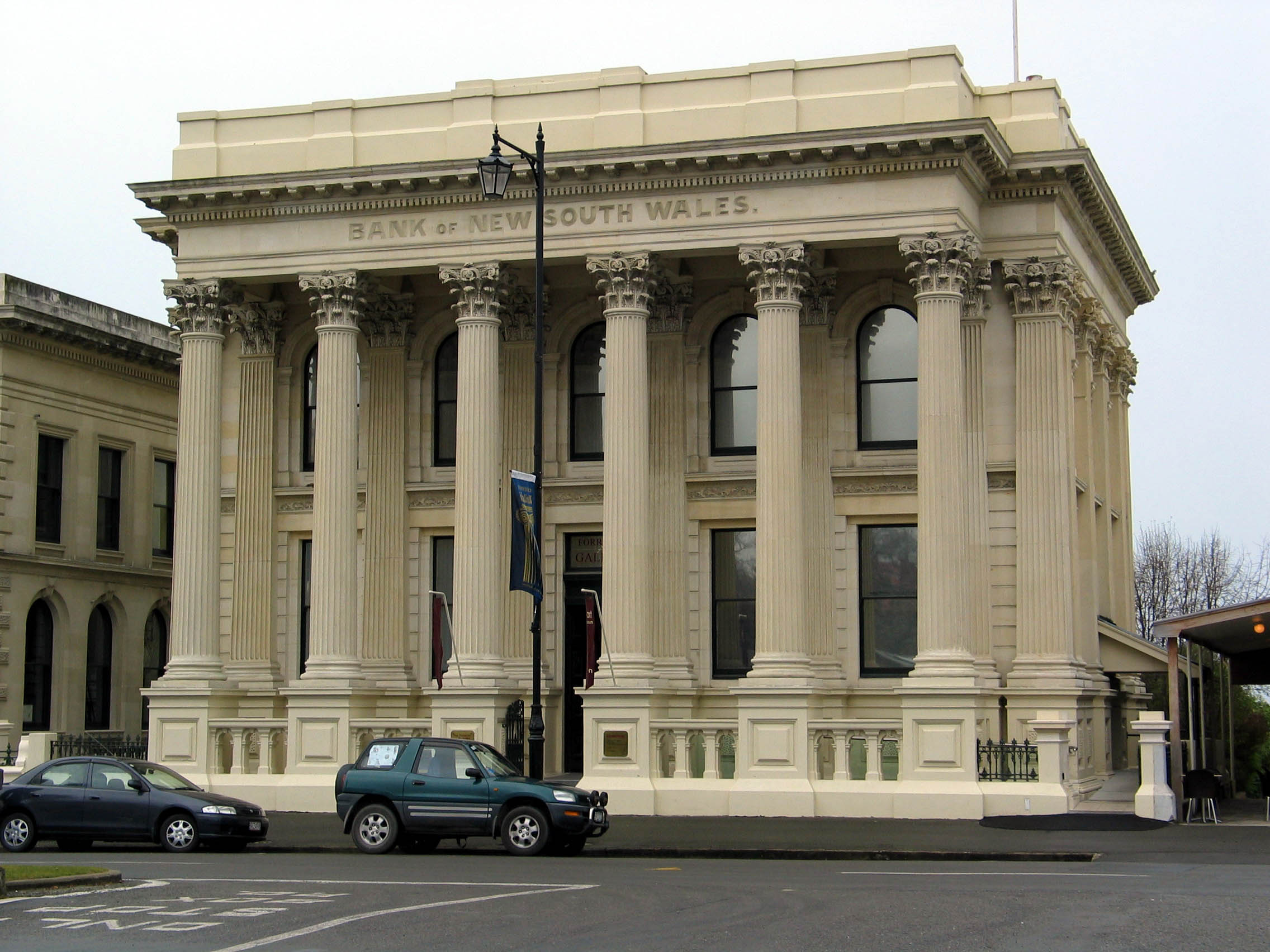
Bank of NSW Building (1882), Oamaru, New Zealand

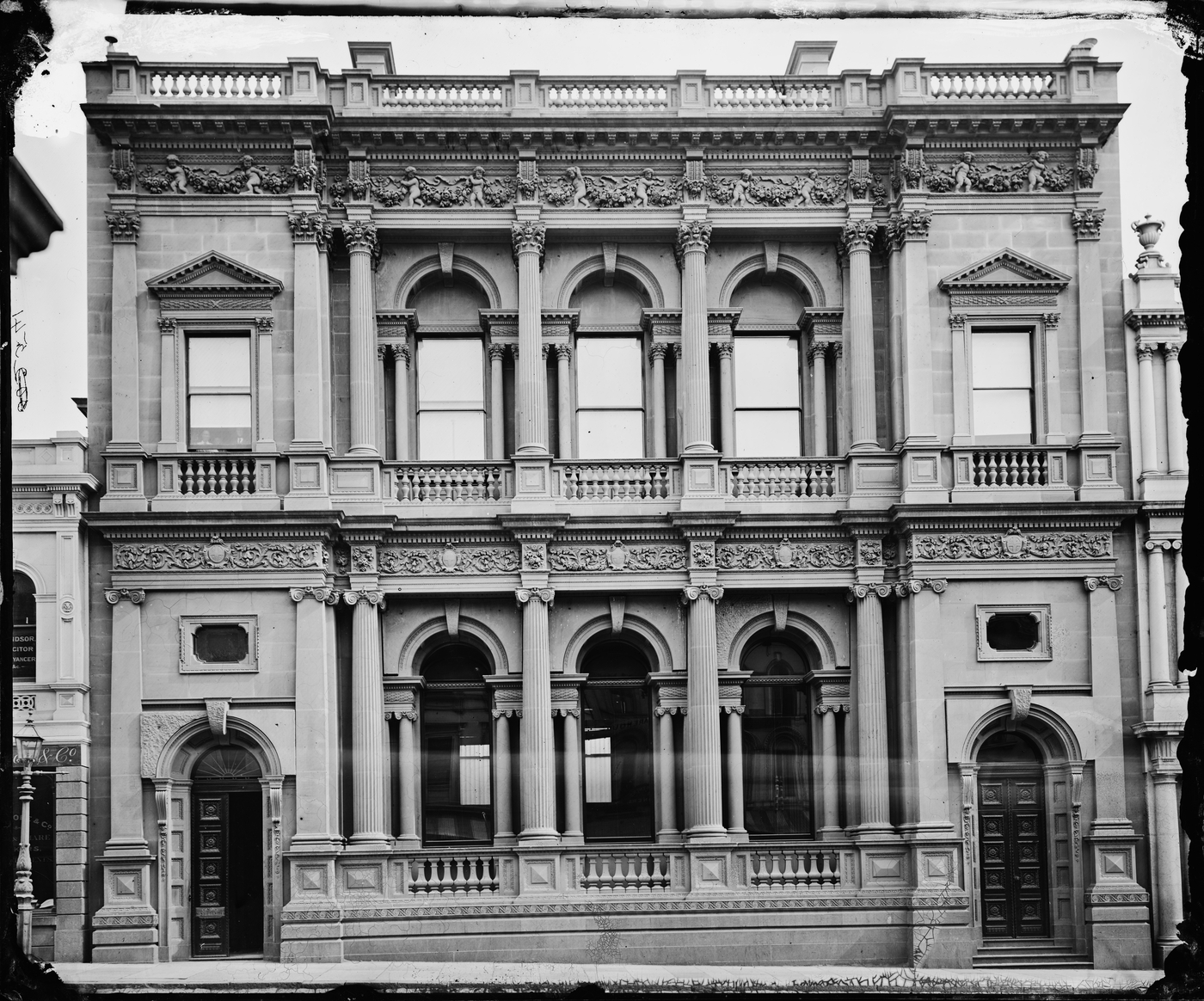
Bank of NSW, 55 Collins Street, Melbourne

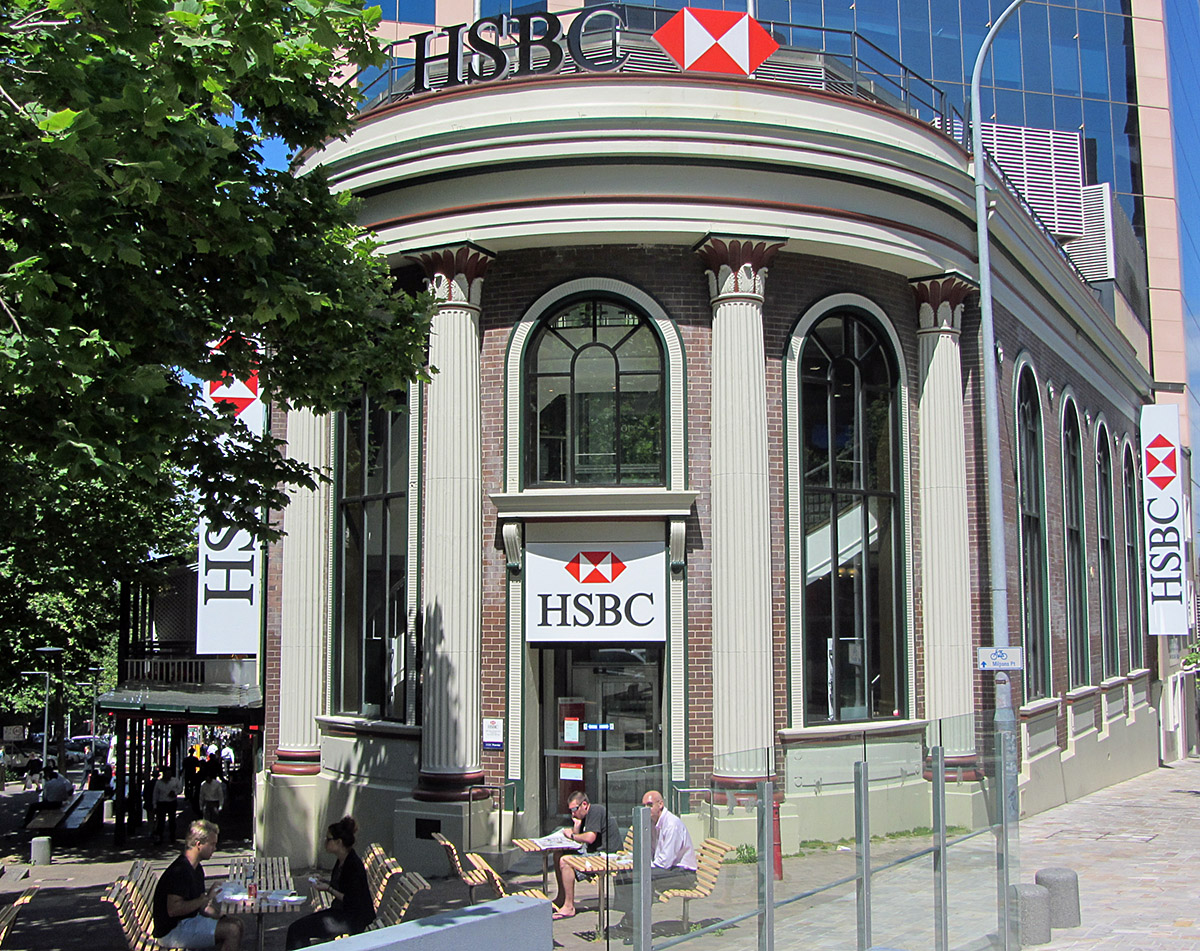
Bank of NSW North Sydney Branch (1931–1974), 51 Mount Street, North Sydney

== See also ==
- List of oldest companies in Australia
- List of banks in Australia
- List of Bank of New South Wales buildings
