= Tattersalls Hotel, Townsville =

Tattersalls Hotel
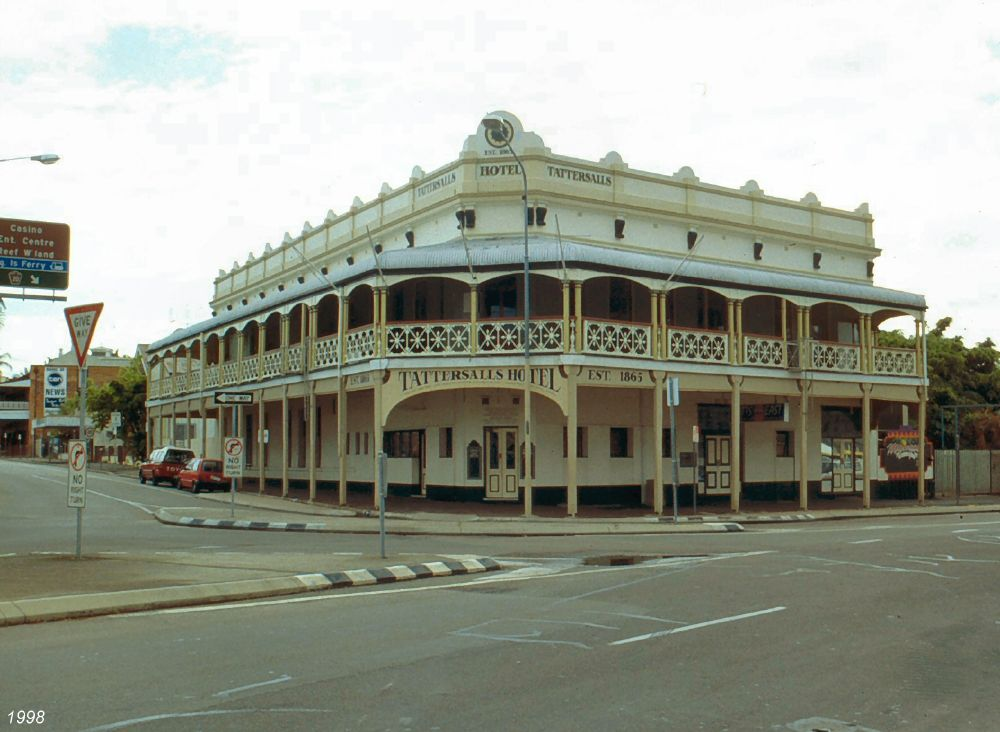
- Tattersalls Hotel, 1998

- Location within Queensland Location within Australia
- 19.2568°S 146.8221°E
- Location: 87 Flinders Street, Townsville CBD, City of Townsville, Queensland, Australia

Queensland Heritage Register
- Official name: Tattersalls Hotel
- Type: state heritage (built)
- Designated: 21 October 1992
- Reference no.: 600916
- Significant period: 1860s, 1890s (fabric); 1889–ongoing (historical use)

Tattersalls Hotel is a heritage-listed hotel at 87 Flinders Street, Townsville CBD, City of Townsville, Queensland, Australia. It is also known as Molly Malone's Irish Pub. It was added to the Queensland Heritage Register on 21 October 1992.

== History ==
The City of Townsville was established in 1864 as a port for rapidly developing pastoral districts in the hinterland. John Melton Black, who had pastoral runs in the Cleveland Bay area, formed a partnership with Robert Towns to secure financial backing for plans to establish a port at the mouth of Ross Creek. The port was proclaimed in October 1865 and by the end of the year the population was between 100 and 200 people. Townsville was proclaimed a municipality in 1866 and became the centre of substantial and continuous growth, particularly with the discovery of five major goldfields in the vicinity within six years.

Wharves, stores, shops, hotels and housing were rapidly established at the new port. The land now at the corner of Wickham and Flinders Streets proved an ideal location for a hotel. Opposite the wharves, the site was first developed by Hermann de Zoet & Company as the "Townsville Boarding House, Cleveland Bay" in 1865. In December 1865 de Zoet applied for a licence for the Townsville on the same site at the corner of Flinders and Wickham Street.

The original hotel was a single storey timber building of simple design incorporating two sitting rooms and four bed rooms with an awning facing both streets. In 1866 Joseph Fletcher and Bernard O'Neill purchased the property, retaining the hotel for six months before selling in December to Alexander Mollison.

In March 1867 the township experienced its first cyclone, which destroyed the hotel and much of the town. Mollison rebuilt the hotel in a matter of weeks and reopened with "a Grand Ball". However, by the time he reopened the hotel he had exhausted his funds, and he died the following year. The place was purchased by James Evans, who renamed the hotel Tattersall's. This name evoked the model of sporting clubs established in Britain and their connection with horse racing, a sport which Evans was actively involved in. At this time Townsville's Tattersall's Hotel was only the second Tattersall's in Queensland, a club having been established in Adelaide Street, Brisbane in 1856.

On 11 April 1868 the Cleveland Bay Express featured a tender notice for a two-storey extension to the hotel. The decision to expand was probably due to both economic and environmental factors. Recent gold discoveries had brought more mining prospectors to the town, and a better class of hotel was required to compete with the likes of the popular Criterion and Exchange hotels. A decision to construct out of brick may also have been a direct response to the cyclone the previous year.

The new section in Wickham Street consisted of two, two-storeyed buildings. Both were constructed of imported brick, as brickworks were not yet established in Townsville. When travelling down Wickham Street from The Strand, the first of the two new buildings was a plain building with access from the street. The next building adjoining the 1865 timber hotel featured a balcony with a timber balustrade which incorporated simple cross braced panels and a facia with an unusual corrugated decoration.

Evans incorporated an "American Bowling Saloon" to attract clients, provide entertainment and fill the void of bowling activity left after the destruction of the saloon at Hamilton's Hotel in Denham Street by the 1867 cyclone.

Although Flinders Street may have been the commercial centre of the township, Wickham Street was the administrative core. By the end of the 1860s it contained the Court and Customs House, Telegraph House, Post Office and a Bank. In July 1869 Evans advertised that the hotel had received "extensive improvements and additions" and could accommodate "a much larger circle of patrons in 'first-class style'; [it] had 'cool' ale, spirits, porter and wines always on hand as well as 'first class stabling'".

The Townsville economy continued to boom in the 1870s and 1880s as the gold fields created new markets for the flagging pastoral industry. New industries were developed such as sugar cane and manufacturing. Infrastructure and administration also developed as the population expanded to total 1500 in 1875. Civic and commercial works underlined Townsville's growing importance as the regional centre and port of an extensive pastoral and mineral district.

Evans left Tattersall's in 1872 to supervise the building of his new Queen's Hotel on the Strand. James McGrath became the licensee of Tattersall's in 1874 beginning a long association of the extended McGrath family with the hotel. Following his death in 1878, his son Daniel McGrath became the licensee. In that year, Thomas Enright, who became a leading community figure associated with Tattersall's hotel, became the licensee of the Post Office Hotel, Townsville. Enright had come to Townsville in 1878 working with his father, Thomas Enright senior on a variety of civil infrastructure projects. He had spent the previous years from 1876 exploring the Hodgkinson region inland from Cairns (a potential goldfield) and before that had been licensee of the Commercial hotel at Sadlier's Waterholes (now Morven) from 1873 to 1875 and the Drover's Arms, Hoganthulla 1875–77.

In 1881, the original 1865 hotel was demolished. In its place, a two-storeyed timber and corrugated galvanised iron structure was added to the brick 1868 section. It featured exposed framing and lace brackets on the supporting posts of the verandah and roof. The new Tattersall's was reported to be "a handsome new structure".

In April 1884 Enright transferred the license of the Post Office Hotel to JR Riley while Daniel McGrath continued to hold the license to Tattersall's. In 1885 Enright's wife tragically died and in the following year he took over the license and running of Tattersall's Hotel. Townsville continued to boom with the population growing from 1500 in 1875 to 3032 in the 1881 census. Tattersall's was centrally located in the growing township with the town's first buses operating from the hotel and continued to be the terminus of Townsville bus routes for nearly a century.

During the 1880s the growth of the sugar and mineral industries encouraged the construction of rail lines from Townsville to Ayr, Charters Towers and Hughenden. There was also considerable expenditure on harbour improvements with the construction of jetties at Ross Island and improvements to the eastern breakwater.

Enright remarried in 1888 to Miss Parker, the daughter of a leading Ipswich butcher and he continued to run the new Tattersall's. By 1895, Townsville had grown to the extent that Tattersall's was considered to be "one of the few connecting links between old and new Townsville". The new hotel was considered to be one of the most comfortable in the municipality accommodating fifty. The hotel had a bottle department selling directly imported liquor and made up and dispatched country orders. Enright was also the sole promoter of Nimrod's Consultations which conducted horse racing sweeps that were "becoming more and more popular".

In June 1895 a right of way added to the rear of the property, presumably to enable better service access. It is unclear whether the partial demolition of the non-balconied 1868 extension occurred at this time or whether it was severely damaged during Cyclone Sigma in 1896. The remaining section was rendered from the street frontage, presenting a blank wall and the roofline totally altered. Photos taken soon after Cyclone Leonta in 1903 reveal this remnant section, detached from the main hotel. It remains the oldest identified building in Townsville.

In 1899 shortly after being elected mayor, Enright replaced the 1881 two-storey timber section with a new two-storeyed brick building. W. G Smith and sons Architects produced plans for the new hotel. Smith and Hansen were contracted as the builders.

The 1881 section was moved on rollers along Flinders Street to the Western corner of Blackwood Street where it became Fritz Grosskoff's Boarding House. With this structure removed, the 1868 balconied section of Tattersall's had its balcony and roof demolished. The new hotel incorporated this section into its length down Wickham Street with a uniform verandah, parapet and roof. On completion in 1899, it presented as a unified whole.

The interior, finished in silky oak and cedar, was lighted by gas. The courtyard formed by the wings of the building was paved and was described as being like a conservatory. Wide verandahs and fretwork panels above the doors were designed to channel the Strand's breezes through the hotel. The iron lace pattern used on Tattersall's was also used on two other Townsville buildings, Matthew Rooney's House (now Yongala Lodge) and "Kardinia". The North Queensland Herald regard the new Tattersall's as "an architectural acquisition to Flinders Street".

Enright remained as landlord for three years transferring the licence to his brother-in-law George Sullivan in 1902. During the 1930s the hotel was renamed "Ramages" while Sid Ramage was proprietor but its name reverted to Tattersall's after his departure. The exterior of the hotel has changed little with the exception of the original curved valance which was replaced with a horizontal profile during the 1960s. Around 1999, the hotel was renamed Molly Malone's Irish Pub and themed as an Irish bar and grill.

== Description ==
Tattersall's Hotel is part of the Flinders Street East Precinct. Tattersall's Hotel is a two-storeyed rendered brick building with frontages to Flinders and Wickham Streets. A timber verandah supported on timber posts extends along the two street frontages. The verandah has a cast iron balustrade separated by double timber posts. The iron lace is of a rare design.

Tattersall's Hotel is located on a prominent corner site at the intersection of Flinders and Wickham Streets, within an historic precinct which includes the Queensland Building, the former Bank of New South Wales and the former Burns Philp Building.

It has a single pitched corrugated iron roof, hidden behind a parapet. Bull nosed awnings, wide verandah's and a wooden valance adorn both street frontages.

The exterior of the hotel has changed little with the exception of the original curved valance which was replaced with a horizontal profile during the 1960s. A remnant section of the original valance design still exists at the angled corner of the hotel.

Up to four former doorways on the footpath of the Wickham Street section have been bricked in and rendered. This is the 1868 balconied section that was incorporated into the 1899 extension.

The furniture in the hotel was built by the Tritton Furniture Company.

=== Ground floor ===
There are two bars on the Flinders and Wickham Street frontages. Almost no original fabric is visible, the walls being rendered and the ceiling covered in fibro. Over the bar area air conditioning ducting has been enclosed in a lowered ceiling.

A cellar exists under the bar area. It was filled with cracker dust approximately ten years ago as it had become unusable due to water penetration.

A timber internal staircase rises from the Flinders Street foyer. It has a well-crafted turned timber baluster on one side and handrail height panelling against the wall.

=== First floor ===
Several guest rooms from the 1899 extension remain with enamel room numbers located on doors. Many original fanlight panels and ceiling roses are extant.

=== Courtyard ===
An open area exists to the rear of the building which originally contained a section of the 1868 extension. What appeared to have been a U -shaped courtyard has since been covered over with a 1960s single storey masonry extension.

== Heritage listing ==
Tattersalls Hotel was listed on the Queensland Heritage Register on 21 October 1992 having satisfied the following criteria.

The place is important in demonstrating the evolution or pattern of Queensland's history.

Tattersall's Hotel, erected in 1899 and incorporating an earlier 1868 brick section demonstrates the pattern of Queensland's regional history associated with the development of Townsville as a key northern port and service centre for the surrounding mining and pastoral districts.

Tattersall's Hotel is associated with the Tattersall's hotel empire which had connections to numerous Queensland towns.

The hotel complex, including the 1868 and 1899 buildings, demonstrates the utilitarian pattern of approach adopted in the late 19th century towards reconstructing business premises by incorporating earlier sections as the place developed.

The place demonstrates rare, uncommon or endangered aspects of Queensland's cultural heritage.

Tattersall's Hotel features a rare pattern of cast iron balustrade particular to North Queensland. The incorporation of this design of balustrade is an important link to the other two buildings it survives upon in Townsville; the private residences of the former Rooney's House (Yolonga Lodge) and "Kardinia".

The place demonstrates the incorporation of older brick structures into newer buildings during the 19th century. The 1868 sections are the oldest structures identified in Townsville.

The place has potential to yield information that will contribute to an understanding of Queensland's history.

The 1868–69 additions use of brick prior to local manufacture has the potential to reveal further information about materials and construction techniques that were adopted during the foundation years of the settlement.

The place is important in demonstrating the principal characteristics of a particular class of cultural places.

Tattersall's Hotel demonstrates the principal characteristics of a two-storied 19th-century hotel through its prominent location at an intersection, its incorporation of accommodation on the first floor, public facilities on the ground floor and wide, sweeping verandahs.

The place is important because of its aesthetic significance.

Tattersall's Hotel has considerable aesthetic appeal and is located at a prominent junction of Flinders and Wickham Streets, Townsville. It is opposite the Queensland Building, the former Bank of New South Wales Building and the former Burns, Philp building and contributes to the visual and historical significance of the Flinders Street East, Wickham Street precinct.
