= Bank of New South Wales building, Townsville =

Bank of New South Wales Building, Townsville
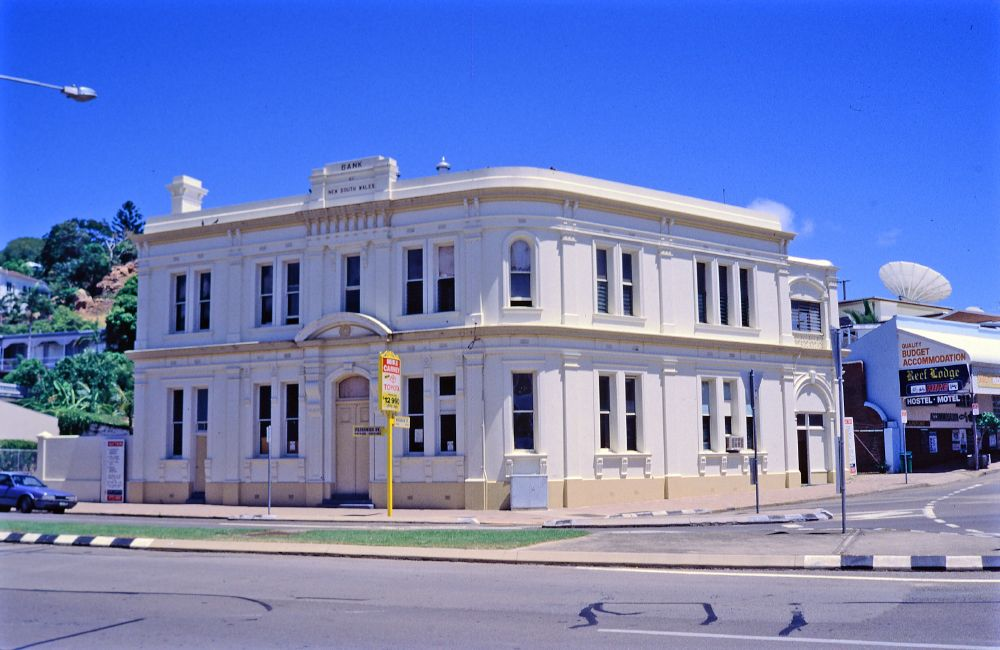
- Australian Meat Industry Employees Union (Queensland Branch), formerly Bank of New South Wales, Townsville

- Location within Queensland Location within Australia
- 19.2568°S 146.8214°E
- Location: 101–111 Flinders Street, Townsville CBD, City of Townsville, Queensland, Australia

History
- Design period: 1870s–1890s (late 19th century)
- Built: 1887

Queensland Heritage Register
- Official name: Australian Meat Industry Employees Union (Queensland Branch), Bank of New South Wales
- Type: state heritage (built)
- Designated: 21 October 1992
- Reference no.: 600890
- Significant period: 1887 (fabric); 1941–1945, 1948–1970s (historical)
- Significant components: fence/wall – perimeter, garage, out building/s, strong room, banking chamber
- Builders: Denis Kelleher

Bank of New South Wales Building is a former heritage-listed bank at 101–111 Flinders Street, Townsville CBD, City of Townsville, Queensland, Australia. It was built in 1887 by Denis Kelleher. It is also known as Australian Meat Industry Employees Union (Queensland Branch). It was added to the Queensland Heritage Register on 21 October 1992.

== History ==
The former Bank of New South Wales Building was built for the Bank of New South Wales in 1887. It was third building which the bank had constructed. Built by Townsville builder Denis Kelleher at a cost of £7,500, the building was probably designed by Sydney architect John Smedley, with construction supervised by architect WM Eyre of the Townsville firm of Eyre and Munro and Brisbane architect FDG Stanley.

The Bank of New South Wales was the second banking company to be established in Townsville. The Australian Joint Stock Bank opened on 19 February 1866 and the Bank of New South Wales on 20 March 1866.

The Bank of New South Wales was founded in 1817 in Sydney, New South Wales. In 1851 Robert Towns, a Sydney businessman, became a shareholder. During the early 1860s Towns formed a business partnership with John Melton Black in his North Queensland properties and investment speculations, including the establishment of a port on Cleveland Bay. Keen to protect his investment in the new settlement at the port and to encourage the expansion of the Bank of New South Wales into North Queensland, Towns facilitated the establishment of a branch of the bank in Townsville within a year of settlement.

The first branch building, leased from Towns and Black, was located in Flinders Street East near the site of the present building, but the managers and staff soon complained that the building was hot and plagued by mosquitoes from Ross Creek. A decision was made to move after Queensland Bank Inspector, Alexander Archer, reported that the bank and its records were unsafe located amongst a group of wooden buildings.

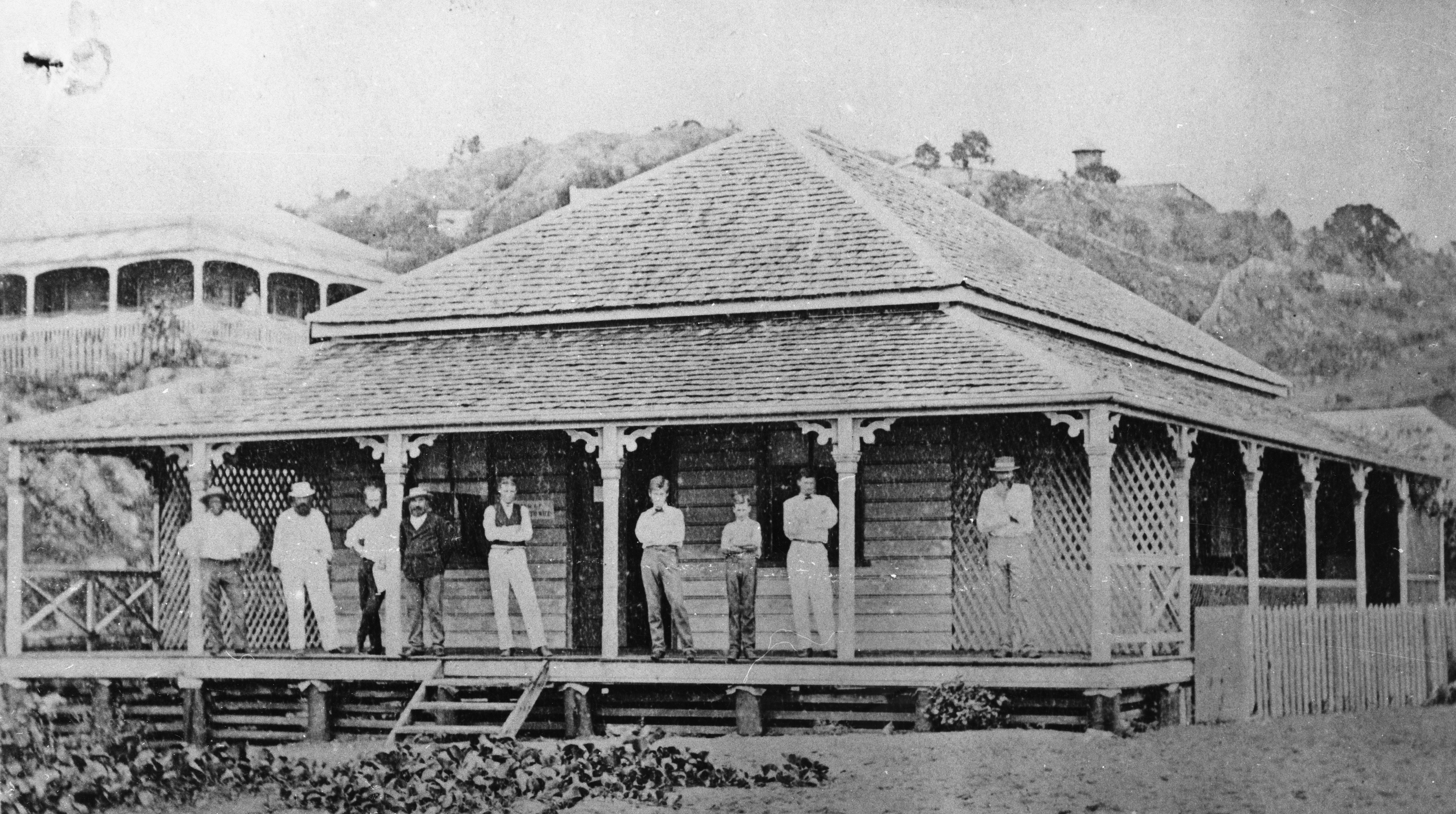
Bank of New South Wales, Townsville, ca. 1873 (probably on the site of the Townsville Customs House)

The second bank building and a manager's residence were constructed in 1869 on the corner of Wickham Street and The Strand on the present Townsville Customs House site. While these premises were well placed for the sea breezes, the building was again deemed unsuitable because of the distance from the centre of town and the difficulty of access via Wickham Street.

By August 1875 the Bank of New South Wales had purchased a new site closer to the centre of town while still taking advantage of the sea breezes. However, the block on the corner of Flinders and Wickham Streets remained undeveloped for a further twelve years, despite Brisbane architect James Cowlishaw calling tenders on 8 January 1883 for the erection of banking premises at Townsville for the Bank of New South Wales.

During the 1860s, Cowlishaw had supervised the construction of the Brisbane branch of the Bank of NSW for Sydney architect GA Mansfield, and was also involved in the construction of branches in Bowen and Rockhampton. It is not certain whether the 1883 tender for a new bank building in Townsville was for a building designed by Cowlishaw, or another design by Mansfield to be supervised by Cowlishaw. However, newspaper reports of 1887 suggest that, either way, the 1883 design for a Bank of New South Wales in Townsville was not constructed.

By October 1887 however, the Townsville Herald noted that FDG Stanley, architect for three buildings being erected in Townsville including the Bank of NSW, inspected these with his local representative Mr WM Eyre who was supervising their construction. Three months later on 24 December 1887, the same newspaper congratulated the architect Mr Smedley of Sydney for his design of the newly completed Bank of New South Wales building. This suggests Smedley was Mansfield's successor as the bank's design architect in Sydney, and Eyre was the local supervising architect with Stanley his senior partner.

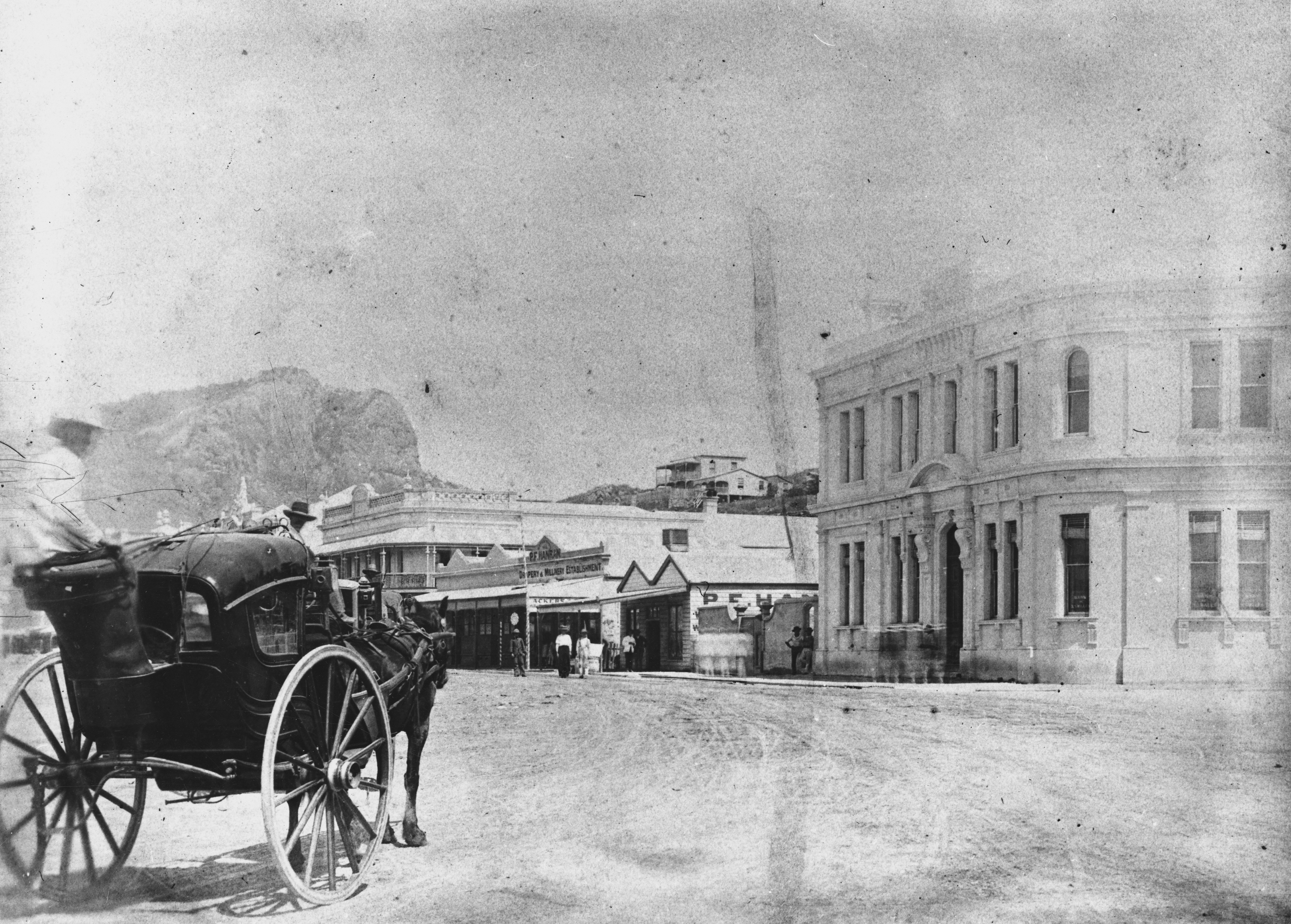
Bank of New South Wales (right), Townsville, circa 1888

The new premises included the banking chamber, manager and accountant's offices, strong rooms and ablution facilities. The manager's residence included nine private rooms, kitchen, bathroom linen press and pantry. Included in the complex were stables, a coach house and a messenger's room.

In 1925 Townsville architect Walter Hunt supervised alterations to the building including the installation of the pressed metal ceiling in the banking chamber. The work was carried out by contractor J Hillman.

On 17 November 1931 the Bank of Commerce amalgamated with the Bank of New South Wales. In Townsville the combined businesses operated from the Flinders St/Wickham Street offices until 12 January 1935 when the main office of the bank moved to new premises at the corner of Flinders and Stokes Streets.

The former premises became known as the East Flinders Street Branch of the Bank of New South Wales, with the branch operating from the building until it was sold. Historical Services Section of the Westpac Banking Corporation provided information that the property was sold in 1940 for £2500 but titles information indicates that the building was not sold until 26 February 1941 when the Queensland branch of the Australian Meat Industry Employees Union (AMIEU) purchased it.

With the threat of invasion of Australia by Japan during the early years of WWII, Townsville was selected as the supply base for the allied forces in the south west Pacific. By 1941 many buildings in the city had been requisitioned including the former Bank of New South Wales from the AMIEU.

A detachment of Area Signals personnel established a telegraph, switchboard and dispatch rider service in the building prior to February 1942. For a short time after the attack on Pearl Harbor, Col North, Commander of the Townsville area, established his headquarters in the building along with the Signals Corp. During this period PMG style switchboards were installed and the communication centre connected to service units being established throughout the region. Telegraph facilities in the building were linked to Charters Towers and to units further west as well as to Victoria Barracks, Brisbane. Part of the first floor was also used as living quarters for the Area Signals Officer and Operations Officer.

During this period, a concrete bunker was constructed at the rear of the property to house a cypher group who worked to decode Japanese messages. Pigeon lofts were also built in the yard to supply ships and aircraft with carrier pigeons.

Towards the end of 1942 or early 1943, the switch installation became a security monitor of all telephone calls, both civil and military, emanating from North Queensland. About twenty AWAs staffed the switch which was connected to the Security Monitoring Centre at Stuart, south of Townsville. The monitoring unit remained in the building until the end of the war.

The AMIEU, located in Denham Street during the war, did not move into this building until about 1948. For the next three decades the AMIEU building became a bastion of the Labor movement in Townsville and North Queensland, with the building and surrounding area becoming a focus for workers seeking permits to work at the Ross River Meatworks, seeking social security in the Queensland Building diagonally opposite, and visiting the Tattersalls Hotel, across Wickham Street which was a favourite recreation venue for all those who lived and worked in the area.

From the late 1940s until the early 1970s, the building was a hive of activity and the centre of labour issues for North Queensland. During this period. apart from the AMIEU, the Trades and Labour Council and the Seamen's Union operated at various times from offices on the first floor, and later the Communist Party had an office on the Wickham Street verandah.

The Seamen's Union, miners unions, the Trades and Labour Council and affiliated unions, and particularly the Communist Party were involved in the 1948 Railway Strike; a strike which highlighted the conflict between the unions and the Labor Party and a conflict which was to split the party a few years later. The Seamen's Union and various mining and craft unions played active roles in this conflict with the Queensland Government and the industrial court over wage fixing measures introduced by the court in 1939. This conflict was to raise questions of fundamental importance to a democratic society, such as the extent of civil liberties, the use of violence, and the distortion of truth.

The labour organisations in this building were also involved in the Mount Isa Strike of 1964/65 when the Qld Trades and Labour Council, representing unionists at the mine, came into conflict with Mount Isa Mines management over bonus payments. The Communist Party was also involved to a lesser degree through union officials and members who were members of the Communist Party.

From 1 January 1954 Remington Rand Charters Pty Ltd leased most of the ground floor and part of the first floor of the building. They had a showroom of typewriters and business machines in the banking chamber, a workshop at the rear, and accounting branch offices upstairs connected by a stairs to the banking chamber. A partition in the corridor divided them from the other tenants. Remington Rand vacated the building early in the 1970s, then for several years ex-employees continued to work from the building. The ground floor has remained vacant since these workshops closed in the late 1970s.

About 1962–3, the toilets on the first floor were altered to divide the single male toilet into male and female toilets. This became necessary after the introduction of a Federal award which, after some 60 years, again allowed women to work at the meatworks, and so women would be coming to the union offices in the building for their work tickets.

There were also apparently substantial wrought iron gates in the Flinders Street fence and at the Wickham Street entrance, which have all been removed.

In 1995, Townsville celebrate VP50 (the 50th anniversary of victory in the Pacific). A small ceremony was held in the building and a plaque presented recognising the service of the men and women of the Royal Australian Corps of Signals here during WWII.

The building has housed Flynns Irish Bar since 2001.

== Description ==
The former Bank of New South Wales building is a two-storeyed stuccoed masonry structure on the corner of Flinders Street East and Wickham Street, Townsville. With the Tattersalls Hotel, the Queensland Building and the Burns Philp Building, it forms a group of late-19th century commercial buildings on the four corners of this intersection. Flinders Street East also retains many other late-19th century commercial masonry buildings.

The principle facades of the Bank of NSW building are set on the street alignments of Flinders and Wickham Streets, and joined by a curved bay at the street corner. The facades are asymmetrical, and are divided by pilasters and by a horizontal moulded string course between the levels. In each bay are sets of windows, mostly double hung but some louvres and fixed lights to the curved bay at the corner, all with external moulded architraves.

The simple squared parapet has a moulded and bracketed cornice above the windows, and a higher decorative parapet with "Bank of NSW" in relief above the main Flinders Street entrance. This entrance is emphasised by moulded pilasters to either side, decorative plasterwork and a segmented arch over the doorway.

Behind the parapet is a hipped roof with moulded chimneys and ventilators. The facades not facing the street have little decoration, apart from the two-storeyed verandah to the north-eastern end of the building. The upper level of the verandah, now enclosed with louvres and fibro, has segmental arched openings and cast iron balustrade, and the lower level has moulded semi-circular archways infilled with timber and masonry.

Through the Flinders Street entry doors is a decorative timber vestibule, with timber and glass panelled walls and doors, which leads to the former banking chamber. The former chamber features highly decorative pressed metal ceilings, moulded architraves and dados, and two central decorative cast iron columns. It also has a concrete safe which retains its safe door and some timber shelving, and a curious window opening to the stair landing reputedly for managers to supervise their staff from above.

From Wickham Street is a second entrance lobby, and vestibule with tessellated tiles. The timber stair features substantial newels, twisted balusters, and boarding to the underside. From the mid landing is the window opening to the former chamber, and a doorway to a small room and stair to the exterior.

The remainder of the ground floor includes several former offices between the chamber and the stair, and a series of small service rooms to the rear. Projecting from the north-western corner of the building is a single-storey wing, with three small former services rooms opening onto a common verandah. This wing has details consistent with the two-storey part of the building.

The First Floor has a central corridor with rooms opening to either side. The corridor is divided by a pedimented and panelled partition with a pair of glazed French doors, and by an adjacent fibro partition. The first floor interior features moulded timber skirtings and architraves, some panelled doors with toplights, some double hung windows, and decorative metal ceilings and cornices.

At the top of the main stair is a hall, divided by a square arch with panelled architraves, and by a fibro partition with a small hatch. To the north-eastern end of this level is a verandah enclosed with louvres and fibro sheet, but with the cast iron balustrade still visible from the exterior.

At the north-western corner of the site is a rectangular concrete building, mostly covered with vines and other vegetation. It is a single room, with access from a covered entrance porch.

To the western end of the site is the garage, reputedly the former stables, which is constructed of brick with a corrugated iron skillion roof, double-hung windows and boarded doors. Access to the western yard is through a rendered masonry fence on the Flinders Street alignment. Along the north-eastern boundary is a face brick fence, with a curved coping, engaged piers and recessed panels.

== Heritage listing ==
The former Bank of New South Wales building was listed on the Queensland Heritage Register on 21 October 1992 having satisfied the following criteria.

The place is important in demonstrating the evolution or pattern of Queensland's history.

Built and occupied by the Bank of New South Wales from 1887 to 1935, the building is associated with the establishment of the presence of the bank in Townsville and the growth of Townsville as a major port in North Queensland.

The place is important in demonstrating the principal characteristics of a particular class of cultural places.

It is typical of bank buildings of the nineteenth and early twentieth centuries, with a ground floor plan banking chamber and a second floor residence for the manager. The interior of the building is substantially unaltered since WWII. It is of extremely high quality in its design, detailing and finishes. It is one of the few intact ground floor commercial interiors of all the historical buildings of Flinders Street East. The upper level retains its layout as a manager's residence, and includes a white marble fireplace and timber joinery. The building was probably designed by Sydney architect John Smedley, and constructed by Townsville builder Denis Kelleher under the supervision of Townsville architect WM Eyre and his partner FDG Stanley of Brisbane. Eyre's firm, Eyre and Munro, were later responsible for other Bank of NSW branches including Georgetown, Winton, Cairns and Charters Towers.

The place is important because of its aesthetic significance.

The exterior of the Former Bank of New South Wales remains remarkably intact. The street facades form a major contribution to the streetscape of the Flinders Street East area, which retains many historical commercial buildings. The facade of the building along Wickham Street also contributes to the linking of this area with the historical government precinct of lower Melton Hill. The intersection of Flinders and Wickham Street has a prominent historical building on each of its four corners.

The place has a special association with the life or work of a particular person, group or organisation of importance in Queensland's history.

The building is associated with the Royal Australian Corps of Signals who occupied it between 1941 and 1948. The announcement of the end of WWII first reached North Queensland through this facility. Purchased by the AMIEU in 1941, and occupied by them in 1948, the building is significant for its long association with the Union, over 50 years, and the substantial role that the Union played, in connection with other organisations such as the Ross River Meatworks, in the social and economic framework of Townsville. The building is associated with a number of other Unions, with offices being occupied at various times by the Seamen's Union, the Communist Party and the Queensland Trades and Labour Council (Townsville Branch). Whilst in this building, these organisations were involved in several industrial disputes, including the Mount Isa Mines Strike of 1964–5, in which the Trades and Labour Council played a key role.
