= Brian Hartzer =

Australian business executive (born 1967)

Brian Charles Hartzer
- Born: 1967 (age 58–59); New York City, U.S.
- Education: Princeton University
- Occupation: Business executive
- Employer: Quantium Health
- Children: 4

Brian Charles Hartzer (born 1967) is an Australian business executive. Formerly CEO of Westpac (2014-2019). He became CEO of Quantium Health in December 2023. He has been chair of fintech startup BeforePay since 2021. Hartzer was chair of the Australian Museum Foundation from in 2021 and 2022, and since January 2023 and as of November 2024, he is president of the Australian Museum Trust. Brian has four children.

== Early life and education ==
Brian Charles Hartzer was born in New York City, United States, in 1966 or 1967.

He attended went to Choate Rosemary Hall school in Connecticut, before studying European history at Princeton University.

Hartzer is a Chartered Financial Analyst.

== Banking career ==
Hartzer began his career as a consultant at First Manhattan Consulting Group (FMCG), working in New York, San Francisco, and Melbourne. Hartzer concluded his time at FMCG as a vice president (partner).

After around 10 years at FMCG, Hartzer worked at ANZ Bank, in several roles including running the credit card business, the retail banking operations and managing director of the consumer finance division and CEO of the Australia division.

Hartzer joined Royal Bank of Scotland as CEO UK Retail, Wealth and Ulster Bank in 2009.

In 2012 he started working for Westpac. In November 2014, he was announced as the CEO to succeed Gail Kelly as CEO, Australian Financial Services, at Westpac in February 2015. Hartzer stepped down as CEO in November 2019, after claims made by AUSTRAC alleged the bank was involved in money laundering, child exploitation, and other banking violations. Peter King was appointed to replace him.

In July 2021, Hartzer was named chairman of BeforePay, a fintech startup based in Sydney.

In December 2023 he was appointed CEO of Quantium Health, which is owned by Woolworths.

As of November 2024 he is CEO of Quantium Health, chair of Beforepay as well as Reejig, an HR technology startup.

== Other activities ==
Hartzer was chair of the Australian Museum Foundation from December 2020 until December 2022. He was appointed a trustee of the Australian Museum Trust in January 2021, and since January 2023 and as of November 2024, he is president of the Trust.

In the past, he has been chair of Save the Children Australia, director of the Financial Markets Foundation for Children, and chair of the Business Advisory Committee of the Australian National University.

== Publications ==
- The Leadership Star: A Practical Guide to Building Engagement ISBN 978-0730390831

Business positions
| Preceded by Gail Kelly | Chief Executive Officer of Westpac; 2015 – 2019 | Succeeded by Peter King |
