= Westpac Bank building, Normanton =

Westpac Bank Building, Normanton
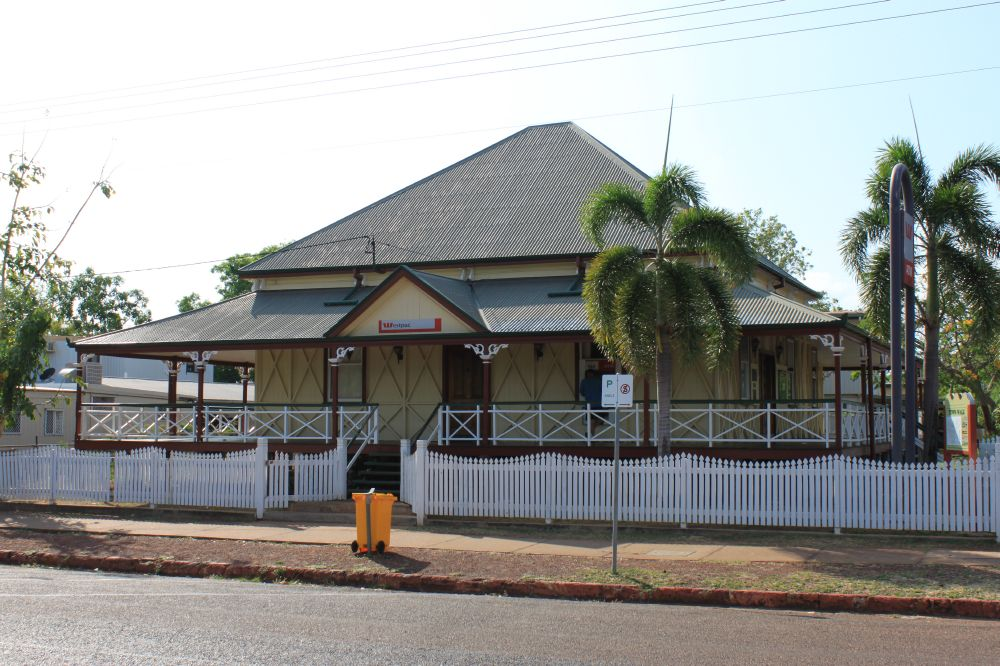
- Westpac Bank, Normanton, 2010

- Location within Queensland Location within Australia
- 17.6709°S 141.0786°E
- Location: Landsborough Street, Normanton, Shire of Carpentaria, Queensland, Australia

History
- Design period: 1870s–1890s (late 19th century)
- Built: 1886

Site notes
- Architect: Richard Gailey

Queensland Heritage Register
- Official name: Westpac Bank, Normanton, Bank of New South Wales
- Type: state heritage (built)
- Designated: 21 October 1992
- Reference no.: 600394
- Significant period: 1880s (fabric); 1886–ongoing (historical use)
- Significant components: furniture/fittings

Westpac Bank Building is a heritage-listed bank building at Landsborough Street, Normanton, Shire of Carpentaria, Queensland, Australia. It was designed by Richard Gailey and built in 1886. It is also known as Bank of New South Wales. It was added to the Queensland Heritage Register on 21 October 1992.

== History ==
This single storey timber building was constructed in 1886 as the permanent premises for the Normanton branch of the Bank of New South Wales.

By the mid-1880s Normanton, on the Norman River, had developed as the port for a large extent of pastoral and mining country, including the Cloncurry gold and copper fields, and the Etheridge and Croydon goldfields. The development of banking facilities was important to the commercial role of Normanton as a supply centre for the Gulf of Carpentaria region. Normanton was constituted a municipality in 1886.

The Bank of New South Wales commenced trading in Normanton in 1884 in rented premises, acquiring the present site in 1885. The building was designed by Richard Gailey, who was responsible for the design of bank buildings elsewhere in Queensland during the late 1880s.

The building was used as both the bank premises and manager's residence until the late 1960s when the manager moved to a new residence. The residential component of the building was kept as staff quarters until 1971 when it was replaced by new staff quarters at the rear of the bank building.

In 1978 substantial internal alterations were undertaken to the premises to update the banking facilities. The verandahs which had been enclosed by the mid-1960s were reopened.

In October 1982 the Bank of New South Wales acquired the Commercial Bank of Australia and then renamed itself Westpac Banking Corporation.

A storage shed was erected on the site in 1991.

The Westpac Bank is the only remaining banking facility in Normanton.

== Description ==
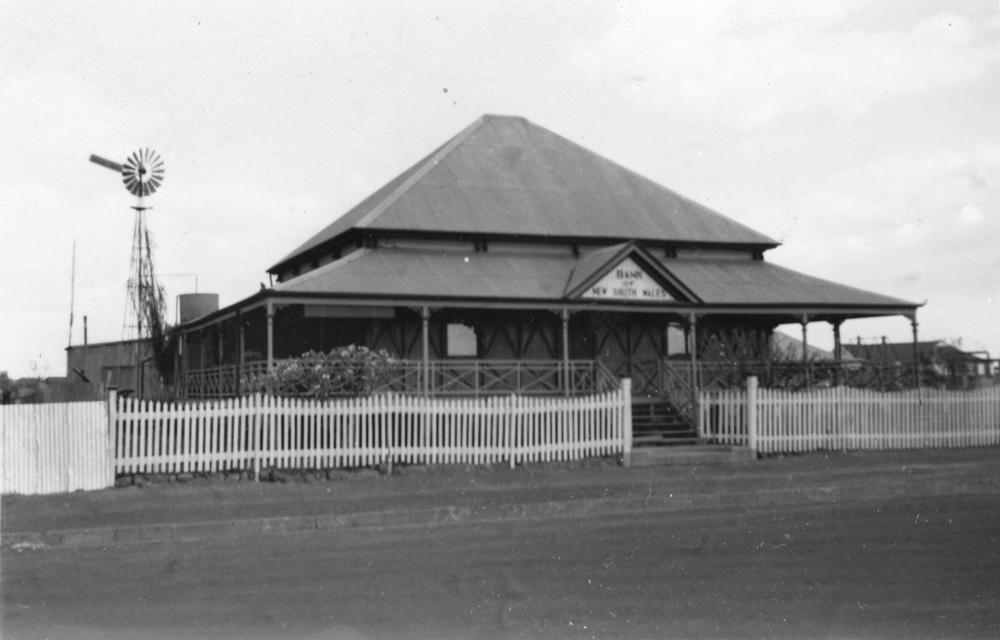
Bank of New South Wales, Normanton, circa 1953

Located on the corner of Landsborough and Little Brown Streets, the Normanton Westpac Bank is a single-storeyed exposed frame timber building on timber stumps, with a corrugated iron pyramid roof. It has wide timber verandahs on three sides which have corrugated iron skillion roofs. The bank has a simple rectangular plan, with a "book room" in the eastern corner. There is a weatherboard annex and c. 1970s staff quarters to the rear of the bank.

The exterior is modestly detailed, with bracing, studding and nogging over tongue-and-groove boarding, paired shaped eaves brackets under the main roof, and timber doors and double hung sash windows. The verandah has square timber posts with a braced balustrade. The Landsborough Street elevation has central timber stairs with a timber pediment above the landing. The Little Brown Street elevation has timber stairs, new doors, and a partially enclosed verandah.

Internally, surviving evidence of earlier operations of the bank include gold scales and the manager's safes.

The Landsborough and Little Brown Street elevations are intact, and the building contributes to the townscape of Normanton.

== Heritage listing ==
Westpac Bank, Normanton was listed on the Queensland Heritage Register on 21 October 1992 having satisfied the following criteria.

The place is important in demonstrating the evolution or pattern of Queensland's history.

The Normanton Westpac Bank, erected in 1886, is important in demonstrating the pattern of Queensland's history, in particular the pattern of development of the Gulf region of north-west Queensland, and the development of Normanton as a commercial centre for the Gulf region.

The place demonstrates rare, uncommon or endangered aspects of Queensland's cultural heritage.

It is significant as a rare example of a large timber bank building, with early scales and safes, surviving in Queensland.

The place is important in demonstrating the principal characteristics of a particular class of cultural places.

It is significant as a rare example of a large timber bank building, with early scales and safes, surviving in Queensland.

The place is important because of its aesthetic significance.

The building exhibits aesthetic characteristics valued by the community, in particular its contribution to the townscape of Normanton.

The place has a strong or special association with a particular community or cultural group for social, cultural or spiritual reasons.

As a banking premises in continuous use in Normanton since 1886, it has a strong association with the community.

The place has a special association with the life or work of a particular person, group or organisation of importance in Queensland's history.

It has a special association with the work of Richard Gailey, as one of a number of rural bank buildings designed by Gailey during the late 19th century.
