= Westpac =

Australian multinational bank

Westpac Banking Corporation

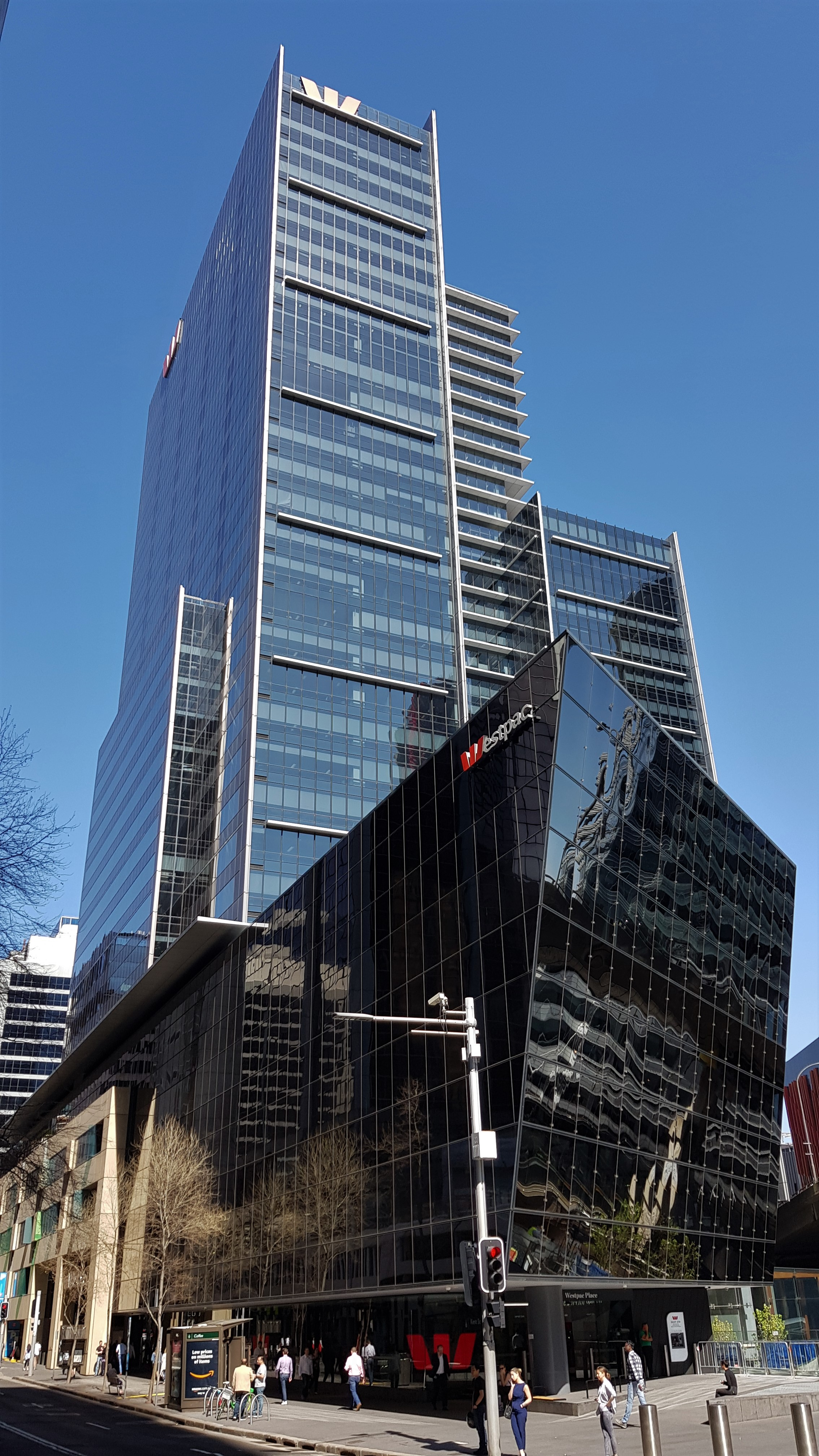
- Headquarters at Westpac Place in Sydney
- Type: Public company
- Traded as: ASX: WBC; NZX: WBC; S&P/ASX 200 component; S&P/NZX 50 component
- Industry: Financial services
- Predecessor: Bank of New South Wales; Commercial Bank of Australia
- Founded: 8 April 1817 (as the Bank of New South Wales); 4 May 1982 (as Westpac Banking Corporation)
- Headquarters: Westpac Place; Sydney, Australia
- Area served: Worldwide
- Key people: Steven Gregg, chair Anthony Miller, CEO
- Products: Asset management; Banking; Commodities; Credit cards; Equities trading; Insurance; Investment management; Mortgage loans; Private equity; Wealth management
- Operating income: ▲ A$22.38 billion (2025)
- Net income: ▼ A$6.93 billion (2025)
- Total assets: ▲ A$1.13 trillion (2025)
- Total equity: ▲ A$73.09 billion (2025)
- Number of employees: 35,236 (2025)
- Subsidiaries: BankSA, Bank of Melbourne, St.George Bank, RAMS, Westpac New Zealand
- Website: westpac.com.au

Westpac Banking Corporation is an Australian multinational banking and financial services company headquartered at Westpac Place in Sydney.

Established in 1817 as the Bank of New South Wales, it acquired the Commercial Bank of Australia in 1981 before being renamed to Westpac Banking Corporation in 1982. Westpac is one of Australia's Big Four banks, and is Australia's first and oldest banking institution. Its name is a portmanteau of "Western" and "Pacific".

As of 2025 Westpac has 13 million customers worldwide, and employs around 35,000 people.

== History ==
In 1982 Westpac Banking Corporation was formed by the merger of the Bank of New South Wales and the Commercial Bank of Australia. The new name, Westpac, was a portmanteau reflecting its mission of becoming a significant Western Pacific bank. The brand name incorporated the "W" that had been the logo of the Bank of New South Wales. Subsequent significant events:

- 1984: The original agreement between BNSW and the government in the Gilbert and Ellice Islands expired and Westpac and the government of Kiribati formed the Bank of Kiribati as a 51–49% joint venture. Bank of Kiribati also fulfilled the functions of a reserve or central bank.
- 1985: Westpac replaced Barclays in the National Bank of Tuvalu (est. 1981) in Tuvalu (ex-Ellice Islands), taking 40% of the shares as well as a 10-year management contract.
- 1988: the firm acquired the European Pacific Banking Corporation in the Cook Islands and a HSBC subsidiary, the Solomon Islands Banking Corporation, which HSBC had established as a branch in 1973. Westpac also acquired HSBC's operations in Fiji and the New Hebrides, and established a branch in Niue that is the only bank in that country. (HSBC had established its branch in Fiji only some 18 months earlier).
- 1990: Bank of New Zealand sold half its shares in Bank of Tonga to Westpac and half to Bank of Hawaii, giving each of them 30%. Westpac bought Banque Indosuez's operations in New Caledonia and Tahiti. (Banque de l'Indochine, which later merged into Banque Indosuez, had established itself in New Caledonia in 1888 and in Papeete, Tahiti in 1905. In both places l'Indochine functioned as the bank of issue until 1966–1967.)
- 1992: Westpac recorded a 1.6 billion dollar loss, which at the time was the largest loss for an Australian corporation. In the process the firm came close to insolvency, and slipped from being Australia's largest to third-largest bank.
- 1995: Westpac sold its shares in National Bank of Tuvalu to that country's government, which now wholly owns the bank.
- 1995: Westpac acquired Challenge Bank.
- 1996: WBC Holdings NZ bought Trust Bank, a chain of regional banks owned by Community Trusts, for NZD1.2 billion to form NZ largest bank, WestpacTrust. The bank had promised to keep the funding to Community Trusts flowing and to keep "Trust" in its name. However, Community Trust funding slowed to a trickle, and in 2002 the bank launched a rebranding which included dropping the "Trust" from its name. The merger of WBC Holdings NZ and Trustbank also saw the closure of many branches around New Zealand. In towns and cities where both and Trustbank existed, the bank merged redundant branches into a single branch; also it closed many branches in rural areas and outer suburbs.
- 1996: Westpac sold Challenge Bank's Victorian assets to the Bank of Melbourne.
- 1997: Westpac acquired Bank of Melbourne in Victoria, paying an estimated price in excess of A$1.4 billion. Westpac retained the rights to the Bank of Melbourne name and logos, but in 2004 rebadged the branches as Westpac. In 2011, Westpac relaunched the brand.
- 1998: Westpac sold its operations in New Caledonia and Tahiti to Société Générale, which merged them with Société Générale Calédonienne de Banque (est. 1971) and Banque de Polynésie (est. 1973) respectively.
- 2001: The government of Kiribati sought to reduce Westpac's share in Bank of Kiribati from 51 to 49%, leading Westpac to sell its shares back to the government. Bank of Hawaii sold its interest in Pacific Commercial Bank (42.7%) to Westpac, which held an equal portion. Westpac offered Samoan investors, who held the remaining shares, the same price it had paid Bank of Hawaii. Westpac now owns 93.5% of Westpac Bank Samoa and Samoan companies and individuals own 6.5%. In Tonga, Bank of Hawaii sold its shares in Bank of Tonga to Westpac, giving Westpac 60% ownership of what is now Westpac Bank of Tonga.
- 2002: Westpac acquired BT and Rothschild Australia Asset Management.
- 2004: The Reserve Bank of New Zealand required Westpac to incorporate its NZ branches network.
- 2004: Westpac sold its branch in Niue to Bank of South Pacific.
- 2008: Former St George Bank CEO Gail Kelly appointed chief executive officer and managing director.
- 2008: Westpac announced that it intended to merge with the 5th largest Australian bank, St George Bank, for A$19 billion. The holders of about 95% of St George's shares voted in favour of the merger.
- 2008: On 17 November, the Federal Court of Australia approved the merger of Westpac and St George.
- 2011: During July, St George branches in the state of Victoria were rebadged as Bank of Melbourne branches.
- In early February 2012, Westpac announced plans to axe more than 400 domestic jobs and another 150 offshore jobs. This action was a response to much slower growth over the past several years and the desire to rationalise following Westpac's 2008 merger with St. George Bank.
- In 2014, Brian Hartzer was named CEO of Westpac.
- 2017: Westpac celebrated its 200th anniversary.
- 2020: In April, Peter King was appointed CEO of Westpac, replacing Brian Hartzer.
- 2024: In September, Anthony Miller was appointed CEO of Westpac, succeeding Peter King.

Between 2015 and 2025 the group closed more than 400 branches, as well as all of its agencies, in Australia between its four bank brands, including 103 out of 106 Bank of Melbourne branches, and at least 100 regional branch closures. The figure does, however, include several (but not a significant amount of) branch co-locations where Westpac and a subsidiary such as BankSA or St George are brought together into one branch, and the other location being vacated. There are 111 co-located branches as of Westpac's 2024 annual report, up from 82 in 2023. On 1 May 2024, the group announced a moratorium on regional branch closures until 2027. This was extended until 2030 on 16 November 2025.

== Executive leadership ==
=== Chief executives ===
The following individuals have been appointed as chief executive:

#	Name	Title	Term start	Term end	Ref
1	Bob White AO	Chief general manager	4 May 1982	31 December 1987	
2	Frank Conroy AM	Chief general manager	1 January 1988	December 1992	
3	Robert L. Joss AC	chief executive officer	15 February 1993	February 1999	
4	David Morgan AO	chief executive officer	1 March 1999	31 January 2008	
5	Gail Kelly	chief executive officer	1 February 2008	1 February 2015	
6	Brian Hartzer	chief executive officer	1 February 2015	2 December 2019	
7	Peter King	chief executive officer	2 December 2019	16 December 2024	
8	Anthony Miller	chief executive officer	16 December 2024	Incumbent	

=== Chairs of the board ===
The following individuals have been appointed to serve as chair of the board:

#	Name	Term start	Term end	Ref
1	Sir Noel Foley CBE	4 May 1982	30 January 1988	
2	Sir James Foots	30 January 1988	January 1989	
3	Sir Eric Neal AC	January 1989	October 1992	
4	John Uhrig AO	October 1992	December 2000	
5	Leon Davis AO	December 2000	March 2007	
6	Ted Evans AC	March 2007	14 December 2011	
7	Lindsay Maxsted	14 December 2011	2 April 2020	
8	John McFarlane OBE	2 April 2020	14 December 2023	
9	Steven Gregg	14 December 2023	Incumbent	

== Core business activities ==
The structure involves five key divisions including: Consumer Bank, Commercial and Business Bank, BT Financial Group, Westpac Institutional Bank and Westpac New Zealand. These five divisions serve more than 13 million customers.

=== Consumer Bank ===
Consumer Bank is responsible for sales and service of its 9 million consumer customers in Australia, assisting them with their everyday banking needs. The division covers all consumer banking products and services under the Westpac, St George, BankSA, Bank of Melbourne and RAMS brands.

Activities are conducted through the Consumer Bank's nationwide network of 877 branches, third-party distributors, call centres, 1,637 ATMs, EFTPOS terminals and internet banking services.

=== Business Bank ===
The Business Bank is responsible for sales and service of its small-to-medium enterprise, commercial and agribusiness customers in Australia, as well as asset and equipment finance and operates under the Westpac, St George Bank, BankSA and Bank of Melbourne brands.

Business and corporate customers (businesses with facilities typically up to $150 million) are provided with a wide range of banking and financial products and services, including specialist advice for cash flow finance, trade finance, automotive and equipment finance, property finance, transaction banking and treasury services. Sales and service activities for business and corporate customers are conducted by relationship managers via business banking centres, internet and customer service centre channels.

=== BT ===
BT is the wealth management brand of the Westpac Group.

Funds Management operations include the manufacture and distribution of investment, superannuation products and investment platforms including Panorama, BT Wrap and Asgard. Insurance solutions cover the manufacturing and distribution of life, general and lenders mortgage insurance.

=== Westpac Institutional Bank ===
Westpac Institutional Bank (WIB) delivers a broad range of financial services to commercial, corporate, institutional and government customers.

WIB operates through industry relationships that allow them to deliver specialist products, with knowledge in transactional banking, financial and debt capital markets, specialised capital, margin lending, broking and alternative investment solutions.

Customers are supported through operations in Australia, New Zealand, the US, the UK, and Asian centres.

=== Westpac New Zealand ===
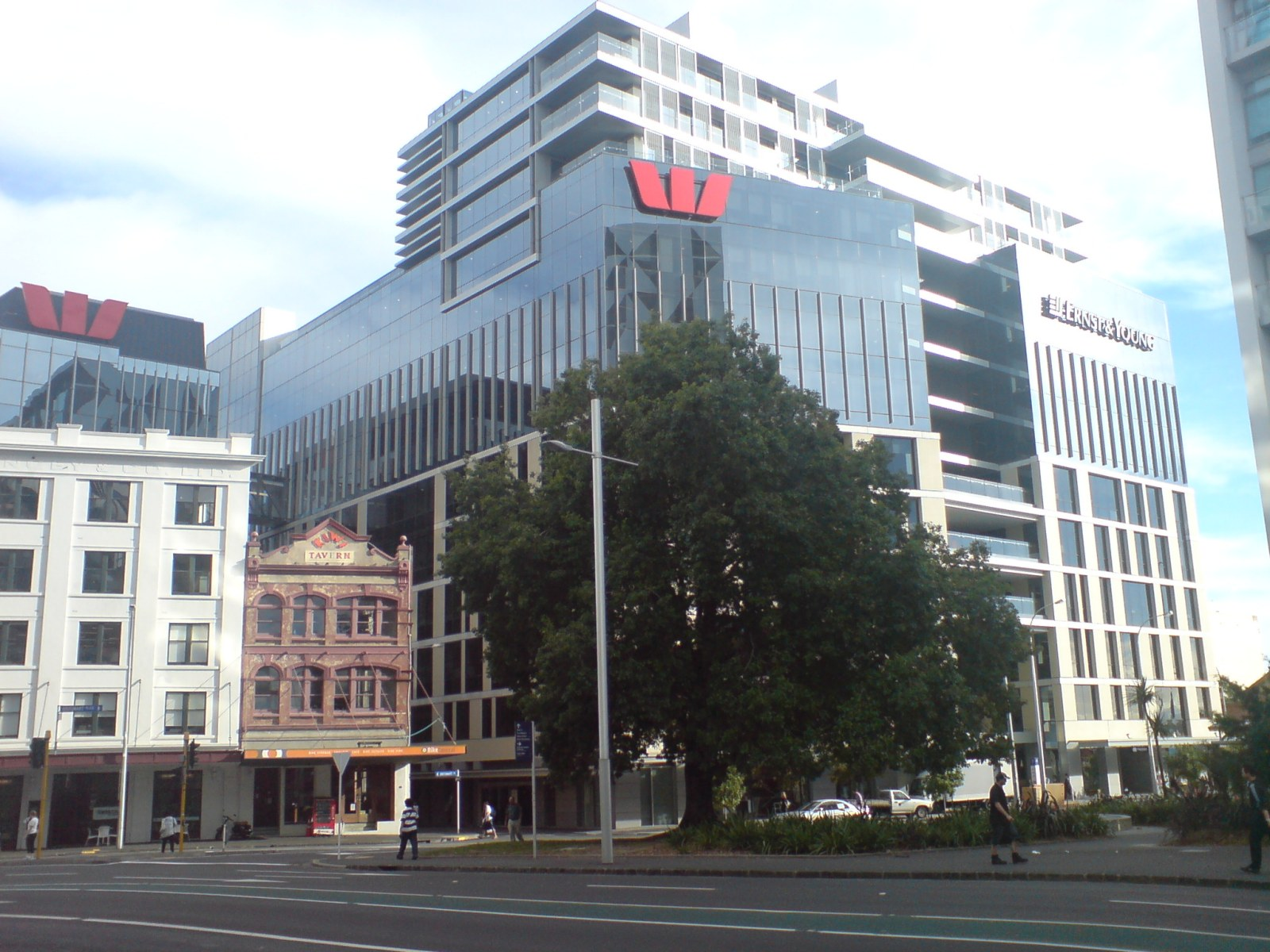
Westpac NZ's head office, Takutai Square, Auckland

In 1861 the Bank of New South Wales opened seven branches in New Zealand. Westpac NZ offers a full banking service with around 1.5 million customers, and 196 branches nationwide. It is one of the big four banks in New Zealand and provides services to small to medium business, corporate and institutional organisations, and is the banker of the New Zealand government. As of June 2022, it was the third largest bank in New Zealand, with a market share of 19%. It is operationally separated from Westpac as required by the New Zealand Reserve Bank.

=== ATM Alliance ===
Westpac is a member of the Global ATM Alliance, a joint venture of several major international banks that allows customers of the banks to use their ATM card or check card at another bank within the Global ATM Alliance with no fees when traveling internationally. Other participating banks are Allied Irish Banks (Ireland), Barclays (in the UK, Spain and parts of Africa), Bank of America (US), BNP Paribas (France), Ukrsibbank (Ukraine), Deutsche Bank (in Germany, Spain, Italy, Poland), and Scotiabank (in Canada, Chile, Mexico among many other countries).

=== Westpac Migrant Banking ===
This unit of both the Australian and New Zealand Bank offers banking facilities to those migrating to either New Zealand or Australia. Bank accounts for migrants can be opened before people arrive in the country, and credit cards and mortgages can be approved before arrival. Westpac Migrant Banking has a representative office in London where accounts can be arranged, although the process can be done remotely from any country. Westpac planned to open a retail branch in London in 2011.

=== Westpac Pacific ===
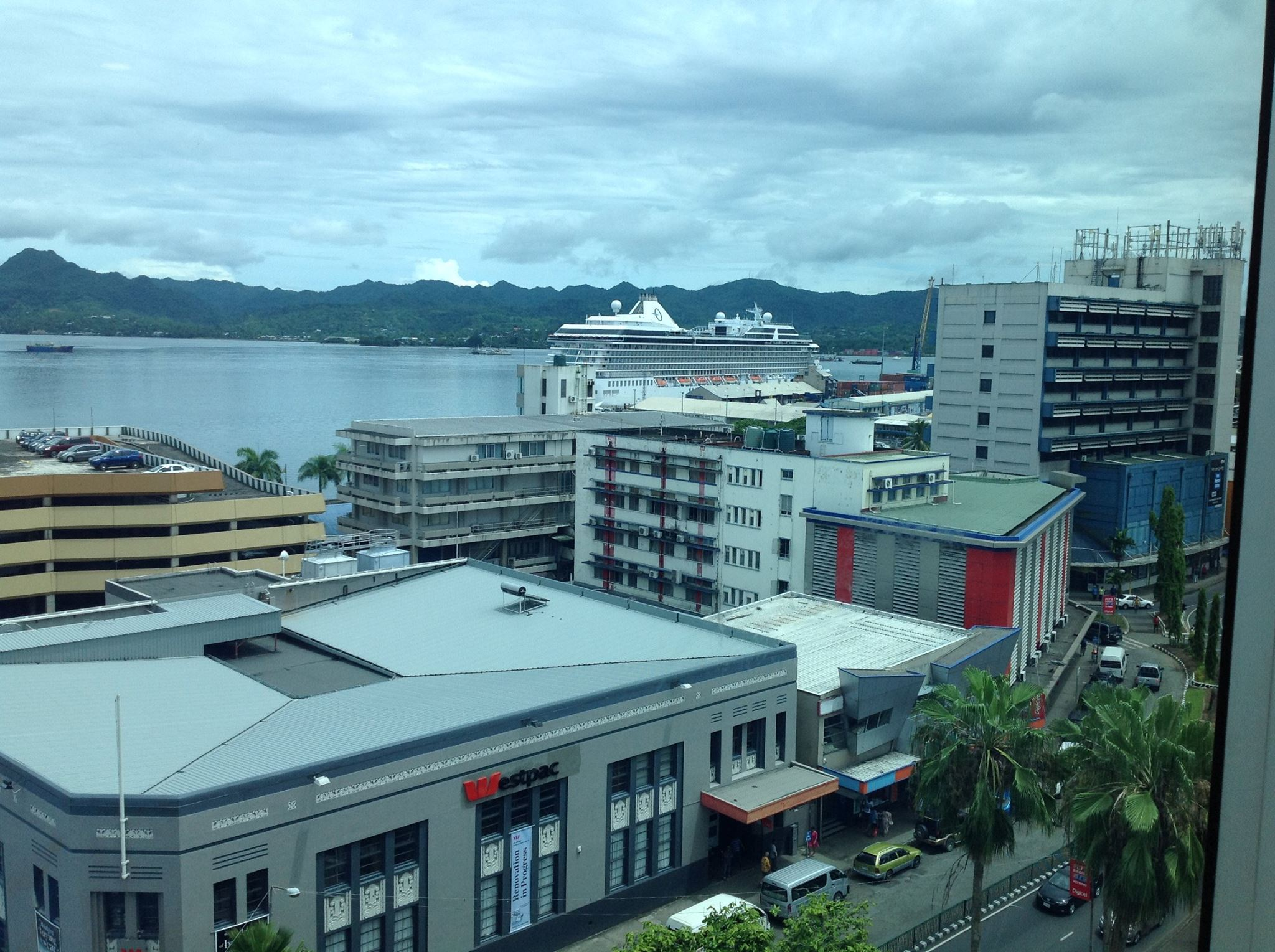
Westpac branch in Suva, Fiji

Westpac operates in seven south Pacific nations; the unit is headquartered in Sydney. The financial services offered include electronic banking (via online banking, ATMs and EFTPOS), deposit, loan, transaction accounts and international trade facilities to personal and business customers. Westpac Fiji is Westpac's Fijian operation. It is one of the largest banks in the country and has a 40% market share.

==== Westpac Outstanding Women Awards ====
Westpac recognises numerous professional women each year who are doing exceptional work in several sectors of the Papua New Guinea economy with the Westpac Outstanding Women Awards.

=== Banking Alliance for Women ===
Westpac Pacific Banking is a member of the Global Banking Alliance for Women, supporting initiatives in the Pacific to help women prosper and grow.

=== Reinventure ===
Westpac has committed $150m to the venture capital group Reinventure with the objective to increase the impact of technology in financial markets. The Westpac-backed firm has invested in start-ups like BrickX, OpenAgent and CodeLingo. Reinventure is mandated to invest independently of Westpac, unlike venture capital strategies led by other Australian banks.

== Corporate responsibility ==
In 2002 Westpac released a social impact report that outlined the bank's plan to meet international standards in the area of corporate social responsibility. This led to Westpac's assessment as the global sustainability leader for the banking sector in the Dow Jones Sustainability Index from 2004 to 2007.

Westpac has been criticised for backing logging operations on the Solomon Islands that destroy virgin rainforests. Because of this, the Australian Greens have called for the Banksia Awards to be withdrawn from Westpac.

Westpac was one of the 13 top ASX 20 companies to support the 2023 Australian Indigenous Voice referendum’s ‘Yes’ campaign.

== Controversies ==
=== US Federal Reserve borrowings ===
During the 2008 financial crisis a Westpac-owned entity borrowed US$1.09 billion from the US Federal Reserve. Commentary suggests this was an unusual move for the bank given its relatively minor position in North America. The public and government attention of the borrowings followed the release of the information by the Federal Reserve in 2010, not Westpac.

=== Funding of coal mining in New Zealand ===
Westpac came under criticism from 350.org for its role in funding mining company Bathurst Resources, which was permitted to mine coal on the Denniston Plateau, claiming that the mine would release up to 218 million tonnes of carbon dioxide.

=== Financial misconduct ===
==== Manipulation of benchmark interest rates ====
In April 2016 the Australian Securities and Investments Commission began legal proceedings against Westpac for manipulation of Australian benchmark interest rates, alleging that it had traded in a manner intended to create an artificial price for bank bills. It further alleged that Westpac was seeking to maximise profit or minimise its losses to the detriment of those holding opposite positions to Westpac. In November 2018, Westpac was fined the maximum penalty of $3.3m and ordered to pay legal costs.

==== Money laundering and child exploitation scandal ====
In November 2019 Westpac was alleged to have violated anti-money laundering, child exploitation and counter-terror finance laws. Westpac's CEO, Brian Hartzer, resigned in the wake of the scandal. According to Australian regulators, Westpac had 23 million anti-money laundering law violations, which is Australia's biggest ever anti-money laundering scandal to date.

On 24 September 2020 Westpac and AUSTRAC agreed to a $1.3 billion penalty over Westpac's breaches of the Anti-Money Laundering and Counter-Terrorism Financing Act 2006. This was the largest fine ever issued in Australian corporate history.

==== Unsolicited sales campaign ====
In August 2021 Westpac was fined $10.5m for breaches to best interests duty after it provided personal financial product advice in calls to 14 customers in a sales campaign. The sales campaign aimed at rolling customers from their existing superannuation into Westpac superannuation products.

==== String of misconduct cases ====
In April 2021 the Australian Securities & Investments Commission launched six civil penalty proceedings against Westpac for alleged misconduct and widespread compliance failures. The six cases that were all settled by April 2022 are:

- Charged $10.9m in advice fees to 11,800 deceased customers for services that were not provided, fined $40m.
- Distributed duplicate insurance policies to 7,000 customers for the same property and issuing insurance policies to 329 customers who had not consented, fined $15m.
- Charged $10.6m in ongoing financial advice fees to at least 25,000 customers without disclosing these fees, fined $6m.
- Charged fees to 21,000 deregistered company accounts, holding $120m in funds instead of remitting to ASIC or the Commonwealth, fined $20m.
- Sold consumer credit card and flexi-loan debt to debt purchasers with incorrect interest rates, resulting in 16,000 customers being overcharged interest, fined $12m.
- Charged 9900 members insurance premiums that included commission payments that are banned, fined $20m.

Westpac was fined $113m for the string of misconduct cases.

Auto dealer commissions

In July 2020 law firm Maurice Blackburn filed a class action lawsuit, alleging that Westpac and St George Finance had let car dealers hike interest rates on car loans to earn commissions between March 2013 until October 2018. In March 2025, it had settled the lawsuit for $130m.

==== Insider trading and interest swap allegations ====
In May 2021 the Australian Securities and Investments Commission (ASIC) commenced proceedings in the Federal Court of Australia for allegations of insider trading and unconscionable conduct over a 2016 $12 billion interest swap rate transaction with AustralianSuper. In January 2024, ASIC dropped the insider trading allegation and Westpac was ordered to pay a $1.8m fine and an additional $8m to cover ASIC's litigation and investigation fees for unconscionable conduct.

==== Home loans misconduct ====
In October 2025 the Federal Court of Australia ruled that its home loan arm RAMS had allowed unlicensed lenders to approve home loans for customers who struggled to pay the money back. It ordered Westpac to pay a $20 million fine and pay $7 million to 48 customers who were in hardship or arrears after taking out loans. A week later, it had sold RAMS to Pepper Money.

==== Westpac New Zealand ====
In May 2025 the High Court of New Zealand imposed a $NZD3.25 million fine on Westpac New Zealand for misleading customers and overcharging customers who were entitled to benefits that they did not receive after it self-reported itself to the Financial Markets Authority.

==== Hardship failures ====
In May 2026 Westpac was ordered to pay a $26 million fine after the Federal Court of Australia ruled that it failed to respond to over 200 hardship requests within the time required by law between 2017 and 2023. Westpac made admissions of contravention and paid $1.7 million in remediation.

== See also ==
- Banking in Australia
- Global ATM Alliance
- List of banks in Australia
- List of banks in Oceania
- Westpac House
- Westpac Life Saver Rescue Helicopter Service
- Westpac Rescue Helicopter (New Zealand)
- Westpac Stadium
- List of Westpac buildings
