= Westpac Place =

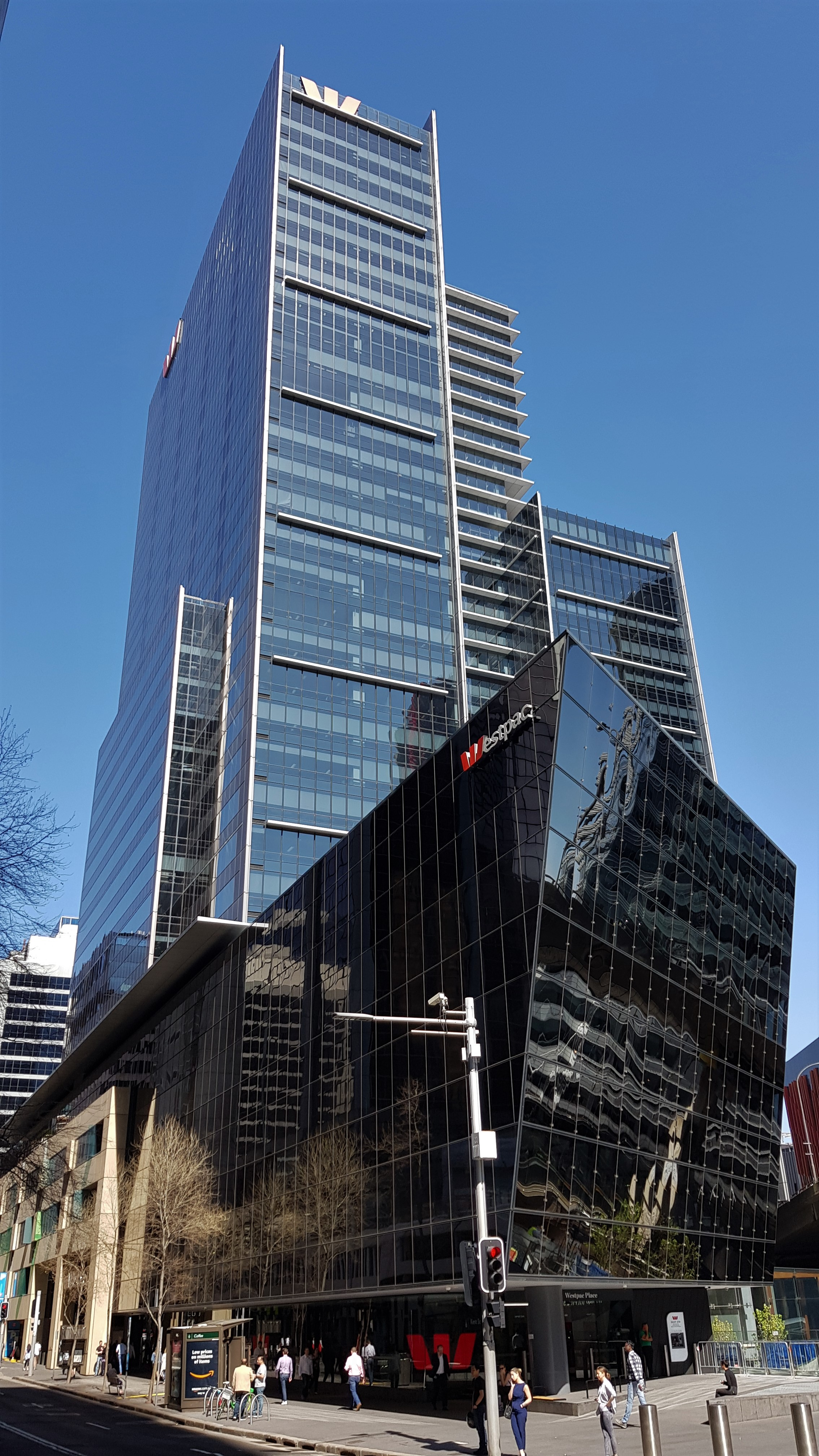
- Interactive map of the Westpac Place area

General information
- Type: Commercial skyscraper
- Location: 275 Kent Street, Sydney, Australia
- Coordinates: 33°51′57″S 151°12′15″E
- Current tenants: Westpac
- Construction started: 2003
- Completed: 4 August 2006
- Landlord: Mirvac (50%); IFM Investors (50%)

Height
- Height: 166 metres

Technical details
- Floor count: 33

Design and construction
- Architect: Johnson Pilton Walker
- Developer: Leighton Properties
- Main contractor: Leighton Contractors

Westpac Place is a commercial skyscraper located in the north-western corridor of the Sydney central business district, Australia. The building is the bank's Australian headquarters.

The building was built for the Westpac Office Trust, being included in the sale of the trust to Mirvac in 2010. In July 2014, Mirvac sold a 50% share in the building to Blackstone Real Estate Asia. In June 2018, Blackstone sold their 50% share to the Industry Superannuation Property Trust (ISPT).

== Opening ==
Westpac Place was officially opened by Prime Minister John Howard on 4 August 2006, marking the completion of the project developed by Leighton Properties.

== Architecture ==
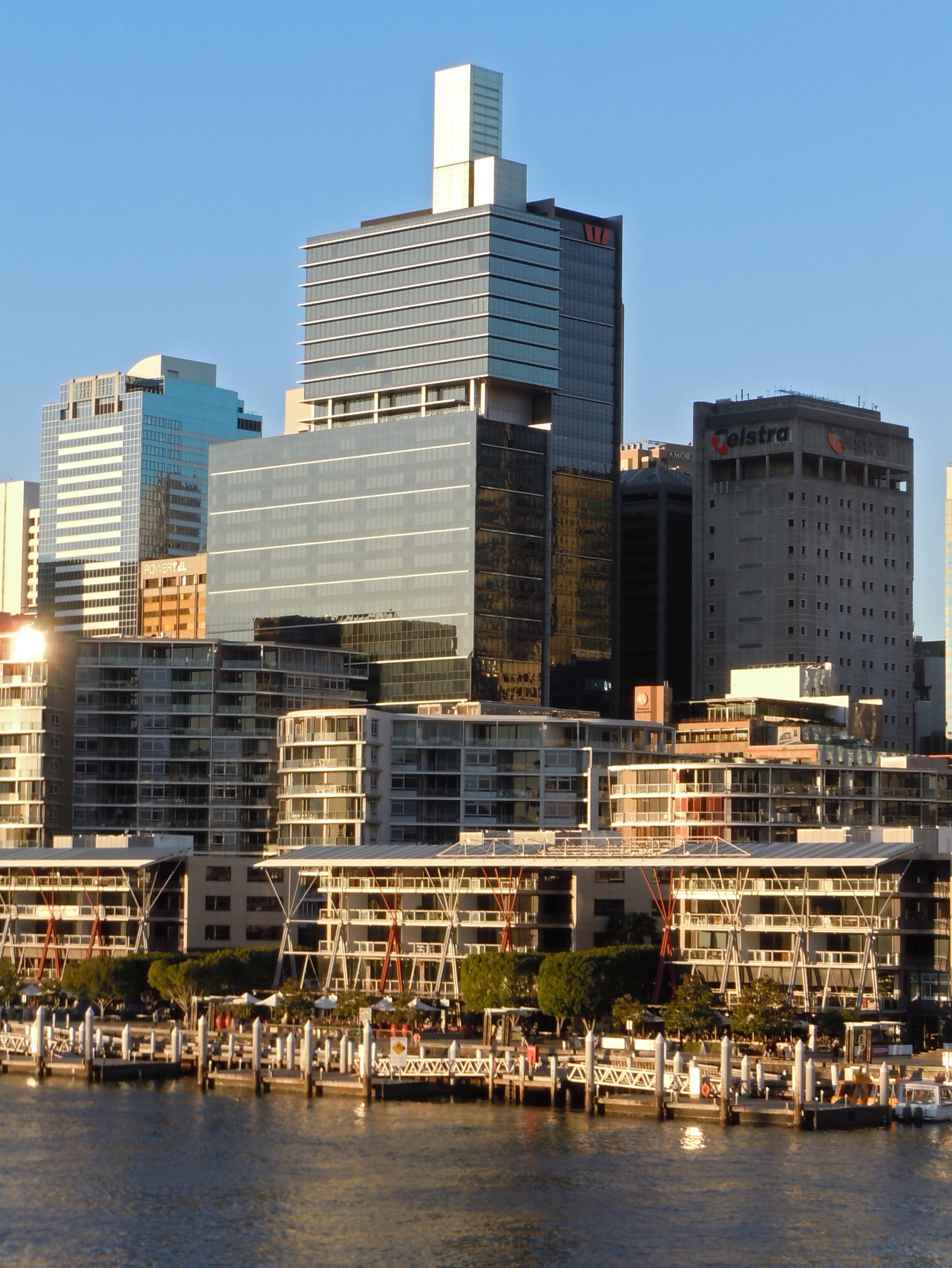
Westpac Place as seen from the Pyrmont Bridge

The architectural roof feature on top of Westpac Place has become a major part of the Sydney city skyline. This feature incorporates a weather beacon barometer, and is a key component of the overall composition of the project. The barometer is a particular response to 'place', and alludes to the maritime history of the precinct. In the late 18th and early 19th centuries, the site was at the harbour's edge, being the heart of Sydney's maritime trade, and was the principal trade route into the city centre.

The architectural roof feature comprises:

- Two metal clad base elements with the larger of the two capped by an internally illuminated white glass tower. The glass tower is 25 metres high and nine metres across.
- Eight red LED illuminated bars (on the north and south faces of the white glass tower), the lowest representing 990 hPa, rising in 5 hPa increments to the top bar representing 1025 hPa. This provides real time information on barometric pressure changes. Generally low pressure indicates inclement weather and high pressure with good or clear weather (although this is not always the case). As the pressure rises or falls, the LED bars will appear to ripple in an upward or downward direction respectively. The illumination level of the LED bars and tower is controlled by a roof mounted photosensor. The LEDs will be brightest in the middle of the day, and will start to smoothly dim before dusk, and after darkness will reach a low illumination level.
