= John Smedley (architect) =

John Smedley – Architect & artist
- Born: 4 March 1841; Sydney, New South Wales, Australia
- Died: 17 November 1903 (aged 62); Shanghai, China
- Occupation: Architect
- Practice: Hughes, Smedley & Thornley
- Buildings: Sydney Trades Hall; Waterloo Town Hall; Stanmore Wesleyan Church; The Coogee Aquarium and Swimming Baths

John Smedley (4 March 1841 – 17 November 1903) was an Australian–born architect and painter who worked extensively in China and Japan as well as designing many prominent buildings in New South Wales. He is often referred to as Australia's first native-born architect.

== Biography ==
Smedley was born in Sydney, New South Wales, to Margaret (née Brown) and Samuel Smedley on 4 March 1841. He was articled to the established architect George Allen Mansfield before travelling to Hong Kong in 1866 and joining a firm of architects there. In July 1868 he travelled to Japan, marking the beginning of a long connection with the Orient. Over many years he worked as an architect in Australia, Japan and China. In December 1876 he married Annie Maria Casement in Sydney. When in Sydney Smedley and his seven children lived in Manly. The home Uyeno was designed by him and was a large villa near the southern end of Addison Road on the point that now bears the Smedley name. Smedley designed the Town Halls at Waterloo and Liverpool and numerous commercial buildings in Sydney and in rural New South Wales. He won the design competition for the Sydney Trades Hall on the corner of Goulburn and Dixon streets. The foundation stone of the building was laid in early 1888 but the building was not finally completed until 1916, although the work remained mostly true to his design. As a communicant member of the Methodist Church of Australasia Smedley designed the Wesleyan Church in Stanmore in 1883. It became the Chapel of Newington College but was demolished in the 1970s. In 1897 Smedley set up business in Shanghai and designed an International Institute in Peking and was elected a member of the China Association. His last work in China was the design of the Nippon Yusen Kaisha buildings in Shanghai. Smedley died in Shanghai in November 1903 at the age of 62.
