= Australian Banking & Finance =

Trade magazine

- Categories: Finance magazine
- Frequency: Monthly (Printed) and Daily (Online)
- Publisher: Andrew Stabback
- Founded: 1992
- Company: Australian Financial Publications
- Country: Australia
- Language: English
- Website: australianbankingfinance.com

Australian Banking & Finance Magazine is a trade magazine of the Australian banking and finance community, providing coverage of the financial services sector, with a 30,000-strong readership.

It is produced by Australian Financial Publications, an Australian financial industry media company that produce, manage and deliver magazines, conferences, forums, briefings and custom and online communications.

The magazine is published monthly in print format, with eleven editions a year. A daily online newsletter was established in 2010 providing coverage of day-to-day events in the banking and finance industry.
