= Queensland Building =

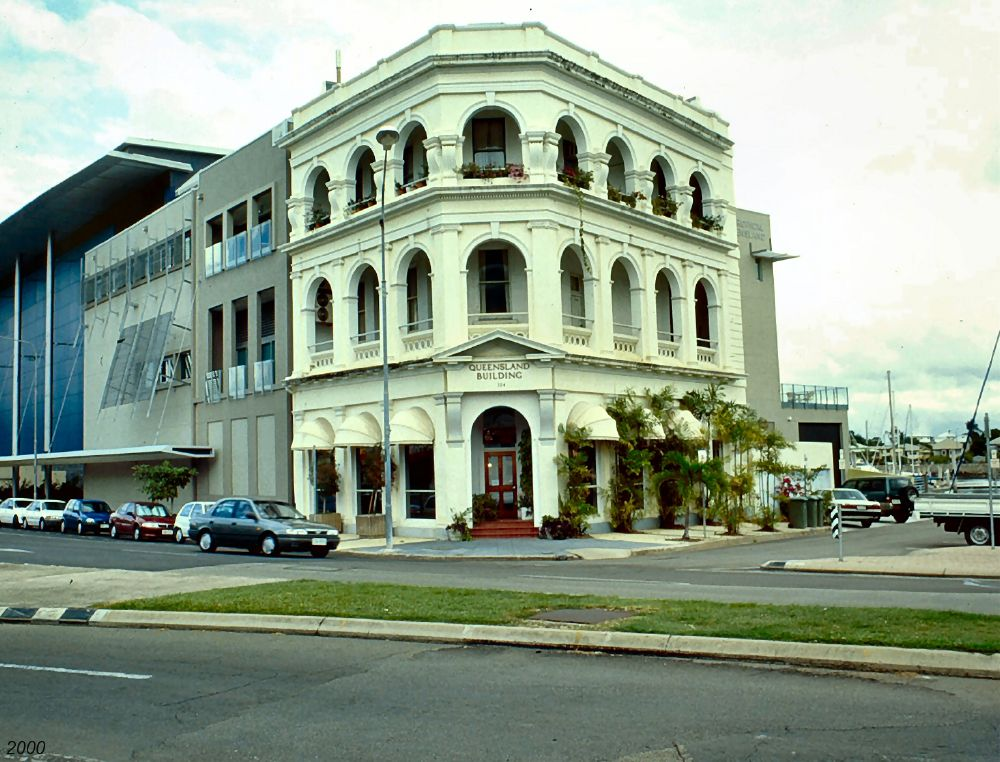
- Queensland Building, 2000

- Location within Queensland Location within Australia
- 19.2573°S 146.8218°E
- Location: 104–106 Flinders Street, Townsville CBD, City of Townsville, Queensland, Australia

History
- Design period: 1870s–1890s (late 19th century)
- Built: 1890–c. 1971

Site notes
- Architect: Mark Cooper Day
- Architectural style: Classicism

Queensland Heritage Register
- Official name: Queensland Building, North Queensland Insurance Building
- Type: state heritage (built)
- Designated: 21 October 1992
- Reference no.: 600909
- Significant period: 1890s (fabric); 1892–c. 1972 (historical use, Insurance Company)
- Significant components: loggia/s
- Builders: John Petrie & Son

Queensland Building is a heritage-listed office building at 104–106 Flinders Street, Townsville CBD, City of Townsville, Queensland, Australia. It was designed by Mark Cooper Day and built from 1890 to c. 1971 by John Petrie & Son. It is also known as North Queensland Insurance Building. It was added to the Queensland Heritage Register on 21 October 1992.

== History ==
The Queensland Building was built in 1890–1892 by the important North Queensland firm of Burns, Philp Co. Ltd as the headquarters for its subsidiary insurance company, which role it retained for over eighty years.

Townsville was established in 1864 by partners John Melton Black and Robert Towns and was gazetted as a port of entry in 1865. It grew quickly as a supply centre, and by 1873 the port was receiving international as well as coastal traffic. Improvements were carried out to improve facilities and to allow larger ships to anchor. By 1880 Townsville was the port for several major goldfields and had opened the first stage of the Great Northern railway line westwards through Charters Towers and beyond, consolidating its importance as a port and mercantile centre. Townsville had many prosperous mercantile and shipping firms including the major partnership of Burns Philp.

James Burns arrived in Brisbane in 1862 with his brother John, who set up a store there while James worked on a pastoral run. In 1867, James established a store in Gympie, beginning a long commercial association with mining fields. In 1872 he moved to Townsville and set up his own business there, as improvements to the port and the wharves on Ross Creek were beginning. He was joined in 1874 by Robert Philp who had previously worked for shipping agents in Brisbane. Burns moved to Sydney in 1877 and established himself as an importer and shipping agent, while Philp continued business in the north. In 1883 they formed a company, Burns Philp and Company Limited, registered in Sydney. Philp was elected to the Queensland Legislative Assembly in 1886 but continued to represent the northern interests of his company.

Burns Philp developed rapidly during the boom of the 1880s and Townsville owed much of its importance to the fact that it was the headquarters of this company. Within a decade of Burns' arrival in Townsville, the company dominated trade in North Queensland, supplying a huge range of goods and establishing branches in such places as Charters Towers. They also became a major player in Pacific Island and New Guinea trading. By the time that the Queensland Building was constructed, Burns Philp had passed beyond being a North Queensland company only and had shed some of its local retail activities, selling its drapery interest to Hollis Hopkins, for instance. Its shipping business was so important that the North Queensland Insurance Company was initially formed in 1886 to cover its own maritime interests.

The land on which the Queensland Building stands was originally purchased by Robert Towns and John Melton Black in 1867. It was situated near the Burns Philp wharves on Ross River and at the opposite corner of Wickham Street from the Burns Philp Offices. In 1890, Burns Philp purchased the land for an office for its subsidiary insurance company. Sydney-based architect Mark Cooper Day, who had just completed a house for Sir James Burns at Parramatta, was engaged to design the building. Construction was carried out by the Brisbane builders John Petrie and Son and supervised by local architects Eyre and Munro. When completed, the quality of the workmanship in the building was highly praised. The position of the new offices in relationship to the existing Burns Philp and Company building on the other side of the intersection may have been taken into account in the design, so that two company buildings harmonious in scale and design formed a gateway to the Burns Philp wharves on Ross Creek beyond.

The North Queensland Insurance building originally provided space on the ground floor for the resident company secretary, the manager, public offices, a strong room and stationery room. The two upper floors had two suites of offices with strong rooms on each floor. North Queensland Insurance was highly successful and soon moved into other areas of insurance, absorbing North Australian Lloyds in 1887 and in 1896 took over the Sydney-based Lloyds Underwriters' Association. To reflect its wider business interest the word "North" was dropped from the company name in 1907.

In 1946, part of the block surrounding the offices was subdivided and sold. In 1971 Cyclone Althea took the roof off the building and damaged the ornate parapet. The mansard roof was not replaced and new, lower ceilings were installed during repairs. The current plain parapet was probably installed at this time. In 1972, The offices were purchased by the Townsville Harbour Board, who leased out office space. During the 1970s and early 1980s, the building was tenanted by a doctor who used the two lower floors as consulting rooms and who filled in the arches of the arcade with windows. The top floor was used as offices and living accommodation by an architect.

In 1987 the building was bought by Barrier Reef Resources who used part of the building as a residence. It has been for some years the head office of a group of companies. The interior contains offices and residential accommodation of the top floor. The exterior of the building is little changed in form, although some of the surface decoration carried out in moulded render, which can be seen in early photographs, has been removed. The Museum of Tropical Queensland has been constructed on adjoining land.

== Description ==
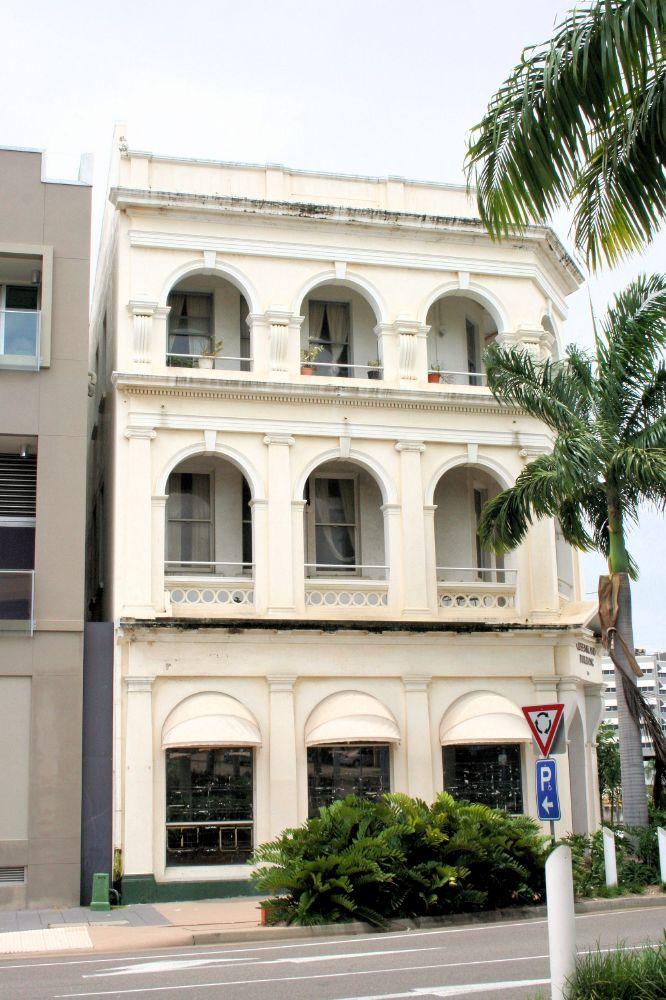
Queensland Building, viewed from Flinders Street, 2009

The Queensland Building is located on the south east corner of Wickham and Flinders Streets, Townsville, and has been designed to make the best use of its position with frontages to both streets and a corner entrance. It is across the street from the former headquarters of Burns Philp and Company which has similarities of form and detail.

The Queensland Building is a 3-storey structure of rendered brick in a free classical style with arcades at each level. There are pronounced cornice mouldings marking each storey. The central entrance is approached by a flight of low steps and is surmounted by a triangular broken pediment. It is flanked by a 3 bay arcade on each side, the round headed arches being separated by pilasters with Doric capitals. The arches on the ground floor have been filled in with glass to create windows and have round canvas window hoods.

The arcade on the first floor is similar in form but has Ionic capitals and a balustrade linking the arches. Sash windows are visible in the wall to the rear of the loggia created. The top floor is similar in form, but the arches are separated by consoles. The area above these was originally profusely decorated with swags of moulded render, but is now plain. The roof is concealed by a simple parapet of rendered brick.

== Heritage listing ==
Queensland Building was listed on the Queensland Heritage Register on 21 October 1992 having satisfied the following criteria.

The place is important in demonstrating the evolution or pattern of Queensland's history.

The style and quality of the Queensland Building demonstrates the prosperity of Townsville in the 1880s and reflects the way in which North Queensland was developed by the establishment of key ports as commercial and administrative centres. As the premises of a maritime insurance company set up to serve the enterprises of Burns, Philp and Company Limited, the building is closely associated with this development.

The place is important in demonstrating the principal characteristics of a particular class of cultural places.

The Queensland Building is important as a good example of a substantial nineteenth century office building in North Queensland which has design elements to accommodate a tropical climate.

The place is important because of its aesthetic significance.

It is located on the major intersection of Wickham and Flinders Streets, where, by its design, form and materials, it makes a substantial visual contribution to the character of the city.

The place has a special association with the life or work of a particular person, group or organisation of importance in Queensland's history.

The Queensland Building is closely associated with the mercantile entity of Burns Philp and Company Limited, who were an important component in the development of Queensland, as a purpose built office for its subsidiary insurance company.
