= Bank of New South Wales building, Helidon =

Bank of New South Wales Building, Helidon
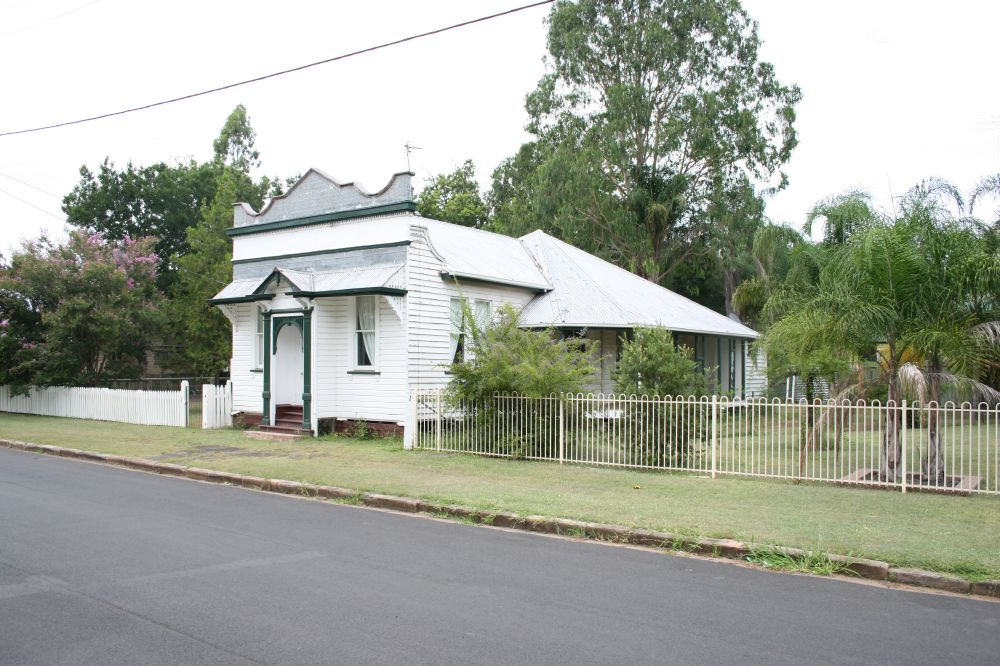
- Bank and attached residence, 2009

- Location within Queensland Location within Australia
- 27.5502°S 152.1231°E
- Location: 7 Railway Street, Helidon, Lockyer Valley Region, Queensland, Australia

History
- Design period: 1900–1914 (early 20th century)
- Built: c. 1915
- Built for: Royal Bank of Queensland

Queensland Heritage Register
- Official name: Bank of New South Wales premises and attached residence (former), Bank of Commerce, Bank of Queensland Limited, The Royal Bank of Queensland Limited
- Type: state heritage (built)
- Designated: 21 October 1992
- Reference no.: 600512
- Significant period: 1910s (fabric) c. 1915–1970 (historical use)
- Significant components: banking chamber, residential accommodation – manager's house/quarters

Bank of New South Wales is a heritage-listed former bank building at 7 Railway Street, Helidon, Lockyer Valley Region, Queensland, Australia. It was built in c. 1915. It is also known as Bank of Commerce, Bank of Queensland Limited, and The Royal Bank of Queensland Limited. It was added to the Queensland Heritage Register on 21 October 1992.

== History ==
The former Bank of New South Wales building at Helidon was constructed for the Royal Bank of Queensland, probably in 1915–1916.

Queensland's first indigenous bank, the Queensland National Bank, was established in 1872, by a group of prominent Queenslanders who wished to secure development capital free from overseas or inter-colonial control. The Royal Bank of Queensland Limited was established in 1885 when local investors were finding it hard to obtain loans from sources outside Queensland. By 1889 it had 20 branches and agencies including branches at London and Edinburgh. It did not achieve the importance of the Queensland National Bank, but was a competitor to it and, with the Bank of North Queensland, was one of the three 19th-century banks formed in the colony.

The Royal Bank of Queensland Limited established a Receiving Office, operated by its Gatton Branch, on this site in 1906. In May 1910, when it was realised that a rival bank, the Australian Joint Stock Bank, was about to open in premises directly across the street, this office was upgraded to a full branch in order to retain its sizeable business in the town. The Australian Bank of Commerce absorbed the Australian Joint Stock Bank in the same year.

In 1911, the Royal Bank held a mortgage on this land from the owner, Mary Ellen Barry, but did not acquire the land until 1915, when it is thought that the combined bank and residence was constructed. In 1917 the Royal Bank of Queensland merged with the Bank of North Queensland to the Bank of Queensland Limited. The National Bank of Australasia absorbed this bank in 1922. Possibly in anticipation of this merger the Helidon branch was sold in 1921. It was purchased by the Australian Bank of Commerce, and so passed into the hands of its original competitor.

The next change of name occurred in 1932 following the acquisition of the Australian Bank of Commerce by the Bank of New South Wales. It was as the Bank of New South Wales that this branch traded until 1970 when it was closed and the building passed into private ownership in 1971. It has since been used as a residence.

== Description ==
The former bank building is located on the western side of Railway Street, Helidon approximately 50 metres (160 ft) from the street.

It is a timber structure on low stumps consisting of a banking chamber with manager's residence at the rear. The facade of the banking chamber features a central arch above the entry with the pediment above supported on double timber corbels and fluted timber pilasters. Above the pediment is a gable clad with pressed metal sheeting. The verandahs to the manager's residence have been built in. The roof is clad with corrugated iron and the intersection of the gabled roof of the former banking chamber and the pyramid-roofed residence is unusual in form, being a striking feature of the building.

There are other buildings on site including a house to the rear of the bank building. These are not included in this entry.

== Heritage listing ==
The former Bank of New South Wales premises and attached residence was listed on the Queensland Heritage Register on 21 October 1992 having satisfied the following criteria.

The place is important in demonstrating the evolution or pattern of Queensland's history.

The former bank building was constructed for the Royal Bank of Queensland Limited and is important in illustrating the development of Queensland because it was purpose built as premises for a bank formed to serve Queensland interests and needs when the state was a self-governing colony. It also illustrates the development of Helidon, which was a refreshment stop on the main railway line between Brisbane and Wallangarra, the state border interchange. The former bank is important for its association with the Royal Bank of Queensland, one of Queensland's three indigenous banks.

The place is important in demonstrating the principal characteristics of a particular class of cultural places.

The building is a good example, adapted for a small rural town, of a combined banking chamber and manager's residence. This residential arrangement was common in bank buildings from the nineteenth century until World War Two.

The place is important because of its aesthetic significance.

The former Bank of New South Wales building is important for its architectural appeal, which makes a major contribution to the townscape of Helidon.
