= Tozer's Building =

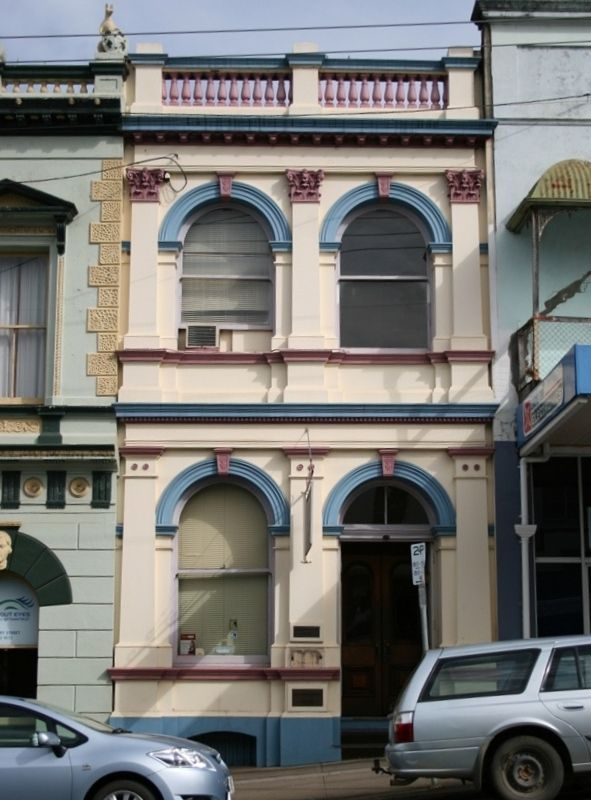
- Tozer's Building, 2009

- Location within Queensland Location within Australia
- 26.1891°S 152.6591°E
- Location: 218 Mary Street, Gympie, Gympie Region, Queensland, Australia

History
- Design period: 1870s–1890s (late 19th century)
- Built: 1896

Site notes
- Architect: Richard Gailey
- Architectural style: Classicism

Queensland Heritage Register
- Official name: Tozer's Building, Jeffery & Cuddihy Building
- Type: state heritage (built)
- Designated: 15 July 2011
- Reference no.: 602779
- Significant period: 1896
- Significant components: office/s

Tozer's Building is a heritage-listed office building at 218 Mary Street, Gympie, Gympie Region, Queensland, Australia. It was designed by Richard Gailey and built in 1896. It is also known as Jeffery & Cuddihy Building. It was added to the Queensland Heritage Register on 15 July 2011.

== History ==
Tozer's Building was designed in 1895 by noted Brisbane architect Richard Gailey as solicitors' offices for Horace Tozer (later knighted) and his partner Anthony Conwell. Practising as a solicitor in Gympie from 1868 until 1898, Tozer was noted as an authority on mining law and as a Member of the Queensland Legislative Assembly, minister and Agent-General. These two storey purpose-built offices with basement, designed in a classical style have been used as solicitors' offices from 1896 until the present day.

Gympie was established after the discovery of gold in the Mary River district in October 1867. The new goldfield established Queensland as a significant gold producer, contributing much needed finances to the young colony. Thousands of people arrived at the Gympie goldfield in the months after the discovery and a fledgling settlement emerged. In a year the alluvial gold had been exhausted and shallow reef mining commenced. During 1881, mines began yielding large amounts of gold, marking a new era of wealth and prosperity for Gympie as an intensive phase of underground reef mining began, facilitated by the injection of capital into mining companies for machinery and employees.

As Gympie evolved from a hastily established mining settlement, the early makeshift structures of the 1860s gradually gave way to more permanent and substantial public and private buildings from the mid 1870s. With the change to deep reef mining during the 1880s came the need for extensive capital investment. Gympie was Queensland's second and then third biggest gold producer during the 1880s and 1890s (after Mt Morgan gold production overtook it in 1887). In this period gold production contributed between 21.61 and 35.53 percent of Queensland export income. Gympie's part in the production was reflected in the redevelopment of upper Mary Street during the 1880s and 1890s with substantial commercial buildings such as banks and mining secretaries' and brokers' offices. Several fires – in 1877, 1881 and 1891 – razed the earlier timber buildings and accelerated this transformation.

A fire in August 1881 destroyed all of the buildings between Patterson's brick store and the Bank of New South Wales (242 Mary Street) on the south-western side of Mary Street, Gympie. This included the earlier building that had stood on the site of the present-day Tozer's Building (originally Allotment 10, Section A). Horace Tozer established a legal practice in Gympie in 1868 following his admission as a solicitor of the Supreme Court of Queensland on 7 December 1867. In 1871 he purchased, under the Goldfields Town Land Act 1869, the town lot on the north-eastern side of upper Mary Street on which he had built his business premises in the early days of the town. The Brisbane Courier reported in February 1881 that Gympie property had increased in value as a consequence of a very marked improvement in mining. Subsequently in August 1881 Horace Tozer sold his upper Mary Street property and moved to leased premises on the same side of upper Mary Street. In 1886, he went into partnership with Anthony Conwell (d 1897) as Tozer and Conwell, solicitors.

In 1891 the premises leased by Tozer and Conwell were burnt down when the north-eastern side of Mary Street, between the Gympie Times office and the Mining Exchange Hotel was razed, and the partnership suffered a loss of £5,000 in uninsured property. The solicitors moved temporarily into a building next to the Australian Joint Stock Bank (236 Mary Street) on the opposite side of upper Mary Street from January to March 1891. They then moved to offices next to Caston and Davidson, Mining Secretaries, (Crawford and Co Building, 216 Mary Street), possibly in a building that occupied the site of the current Tozer's Building (218 Mary Street).

At the time, this property was owned by Charles Campion Bunworth, a Gympie businessman, who owned a number of Mary Street properties. The property had been mortgaged to Gympie MLA and community leader, William Smyth, for £3,200 in February 1890. By April 1894 Bunworth was insolvent and the property passed to Robert Jones who sold it to Ellen Jane Smyth, the wife of William Smyth, in August 1894.

In October 1895 tenders for contractors to erect offices and strongrooms in Mary Street, Gympie were invited by architect Richard Gailey with plans available for inspection at the offices of Tozer and Conwell, Gympie. Upon its completion, the building formed part of the gold era streetscape of upper Mary Street created in the 1880s and 1890s.

Richard Gailey (1834–1924) was an architect from Derry, Ireland, who had settled in Brisbane in 1864. He established his own practice here in 1865, and over the next 60 years built up a thriving business, working until his death in 1924. He designed Baptist churches including the Baptist City Tabernacle in Brisbane, the former Baptist Church in Ipswich; commercial buildings such as banks including the Westpac Bank Building, Normanton (formerly the Bank of New South Wales); and many hotels including the Jubilee Hotel, Orient Hotell, Regatta Hotel, Wickham Hotel, all in Brisbane. Many commercial buildings in Brisbane designed by Gailey during the 1880s were characterised by classical idioms and details. He designed the Commercial Hotel and the Bank of New South Wales Building located in Mary Street, Gympie.

Building owner Ellen Smyth was the second wife of self-made man, William Smyth, who rose from gold miner to mining speculator, making his fortune through investment in mine shares, particularly from the highly profitable Phoenix No 1 Mine. He became the largest mine owner on the Gympie field. Elected as an alderman for Borough of Gympie in 1883, Smyth was mayor of Gympie from 1883 to 1884 when he resigned after election as the Member for Gympie in the Queensland Legislative Assembly, in which he served from 7 September 1883 to 11 March 1899. He was a Director of the Royal Bank of Queensland, Gympie Gas Company and One Mile Sawmill. Smyth died in 1899. His widow was involved in a number of community organisations including the National Council of Women of Queensland (NCWQ), first as a delegate and later as Honorary Vice-President.

Her lessee, Sir Horace Tozer, born on 23 April 1844 at Port Macquarie, New South Wales, was both solicitor and politician. Practising law in Gympie from 1868 and as a joint owner of mining leases, Tozer became an authority on mining law, was a member of the Gympie Mining Court and conducted two mining appeals before the Privy Council in London. He was elected as member for Wide Bay in 1871 but stood down a few months later for Henry Edward King to contest the seat in a by-election. He served as an alderman in the first Gympie Municipal Council from 1880. In 1888 Tozer again nominated for Wide Bay and won the seat, which he held until 5 March 1898. From 12 August 1890 until his retirement from parliament Tozer held ministerial offices. He served as Colonial Secretary and Secretary for Public Works until March 1893, Colonial Secretary from March 1893 to August 1896 and as Home Secretary from 1896 until 2 March 1898. From March to November 1897 he acted as Queensland Premier in the absence of Sir Hugh Nelson and in that year was appointed K.C.M.G. In London, Tozer acted as Queensland's Agent-General from 1898 to 1909 when he retired because of ill-health. During his public life he introduced significant legislation including the Public Service Act 1896, the Factories and Shops Act 1896 to regulate hours and conditions, the Election Act 1897 and the controversial Aboriginals Protection and Restriction of the Sale of Opium Act 1897. In his ministerial capacity Tozer was responsible for establishing the Free Public Library in 1895 and the National Art Gallery of Queensland c. 1896. He died on 20 August 1916.

The solicitors firm established by Horace Tozer in 1868 was continued in Tozer's Building by his descendants for another 94 years, perpetuating his name, his connection with the site and his community involvement. Sir Horace Tozer's son, Vivian Hoyles Tozer, who had entered the firm, leased the building until he purchased the property in 1949 after the death of its owner, Ellen Jane Smyth. Vivian Tozer qualified as a solicitor in 1892, later was elected MLA, and served as a citizen soldier in the Queensland Defence Force. Following his death, Tozer's Building passed to descendants, Seymour Darvall Tozer and Horace Vivian Tozer in 1959, quickly passing to Horace Vivian Tozer solely in October 1959. In 1990 the property transferred to the firm of solicitors, Jeffery Cuddihy and Joyce, which currently occupies the building.

Some changes have been made to the original building. The rear upper storey verandah has been altered, a fireplace on the rear, right-hand- side wall of the ground floor has been boarded up and wall partitions have been added to create office space at the rear of the original building on the ground floor. The interior staircase to the basement, which was accessed from behind the staircase to the upper floor, has been closed off from access from the ground floor. The original strongrooms on the ground floor and in the basement are extant. In 2009 the upper floor offices were unchanged as was the staircase leading to the first floor from the foyer. The original counter in the foyer is in place but the clerk's grill with writing slope has been removed, although it remains stored in the building. An extension has been added to the rear of the original building for offices on the ground floor, with a new opening through the rear wall of the 1896 building, and staff facilities in the basement area are accessed by a new staircase. The basement retains its strongrooms, fireplace, staircase and windows, including their security bars.

== Description ==
Tozer's Building is a two storey building with basement built to the front and side alignments of a narrow allotment that extends between Mary and Reef Streets. The building is one of a group of Gympie gold- mining buildings dating from the late nineteenth century on the southern side of the upper slope of Mary Street in Gympie's central business district. It has load bearing masonry walls supporting a timber-framed roof and floors. Its roof, clad with corrugated metal sheeting, is concealed behind the parapet walls to the front and side alignments and its hipped end is visible from the rear.

Tozer's Building has a detailed, symmetrically composed facade with smooth-rendered masonry featuring elements arranged in careful proportion typical of the Neoclassical style. Openings are arched and of equal widths and are visually separated by square pilasters set in low relief and string courses. Pilasters on the lower level have capitals decorated with flower motifs while pilasters of the upper floor have Corinthian style capitals. Arches are finished with moulded architraves and keystones. The parapet comprises decorative balustrading and a deep moulded cornice.

The main entrance is located on the western side of the facade and is accessed from the street via two concrete steps with risers finished with tessellated tiles. A pair of painted timber paneled doors with an arched and glazed fanlight above provides access into a small entry vestibule which is lined with timber paneling to walls and ceilings and hardwood boards to the floor. The vestibule recesses into and provides access to the building's foyer space via another pair of timber paneled swing doors with two glazed and arched panels inset. A tall, arched window with double-hung sashes and a masonry sill is located to the east of the front entrance together with a basement window. Windows on the upper level are similar in design but are slightly shorter in height.

On the rear elevation, the upper level has two tall timber framed double-hung sash windows positioned either side of a four paneled timber door which opens onto a verandah which has been modified. The verandah has a bullnosed roof clad with corrugated metal sheeting and a dowel balustrade. A concrete blockwork addition to the ground floor and basement level extends toward Reef Street and the rear elevation houses exit doors on the eastern side to both levels.

The ground floor of the 1896 building contains three rooms: the foyer, a strongroom and a rear office. The foyer contains the original counter with robust detailing, part of which is stored in the basement and a grandfather clock on the southern wall. On the north-western wall, a half-turn stair provides access to the upper level. Paneling to the underside of the first flight houses an access door to a single flight of stairs leading to the basement. The stairs consist of closed risers and treads with turned balusters and newel posts, the basement stair is painted and the upper staircase is clear finished.

The strongroom with heavy metal door is also located on the north- western wall adjacent to a fireplace to the rear office. Partial height timber framed partitions lined with plasterboard positioned parallel to the south-eastern wall, are later additions and separate the office and strongroom from a hall created to access the rear addition.

On the first floor, two offices are separated by the upper flight of stairs. The front office which has a fireplace on its south-western wall has been divided into two offices and an entrance vestibule by timber framed partial height partitions lined with plasterboard. The rear office which has access to the rear verandah has a fireplace on its north-western wall and safes set into masonry in the northern corner.

The basement of the 1896 building, has painted brickwork walls lined throughout with storage shelves. A strongroom is located beneath the ground floor strongroom adjacent to a fireplace. The ceilings are lined with tongue and groove boards and the floor is formed with concrete. The rear wall contains a central door and two full height windows with double hung sashes secured with metal grilles.

Original internal walls on the upper two levels are finished with plaster lined to imitate stone ashlar while ceilings on all levels are lined with double beaded tongue and groove boards with timber cornices. Internal openings are generous in height and consist of timber-paneled doors with glazed pivoting fanlights above. Generous timber skirting boards, skirting blocks and architraves are located in many areas. The majority of the interior timber work and joinery is clear finished though the skirting in the rear office of the ground floor has been painted. Original door and window furniture survives and some light fittings including gas jets above the staircase and in the rear office on the first floor.

The two storey rear concrete block extension is not of cultural heritage significance.

== Heritage listing ==
Tozer's Building was listed on the Queensland Heritage Register on 15 July 2011 having satisfied the following criteria.

The place is important in demonstrating the evolution or pattern of Queensland's history.

Tozer's Building (1896) is important in demonstrating the evolution of gold mining at Gympie, a major contributor to the wealth of Queensland for approximately 60 years from 1867. As Gympie gold production evolved from alluvial to shallow reef mining to deep reef mining from 1875, the changes were reflected in the erection of more permanent and elaborate buildings in the town centre.

As the offices of solicitor and politician Sir Horace Tozer, a leading authority on mining law during Queensland's gold era, the building is the product of Gympie's importance as the third largest goldfield in Queensland during the 1890s and illustrates the importance of gold mining in Queensland history.

Its siting near Commissioners Hill in the vicinity of important government and gold-related buildings also illustrates the growth and evolution of Gympie's development. It forms part of the upper Mary Street gold era precinct.

The place is important in demonstrating the principal characteristics of a particular class of cultural places.

Tozer's Building is a good example of commercial offices designed by Richard Gailey. The original 1896 structure is important in demonstrating the principal characteristics of Victorian-era commercial offices. It comprises a foyer, handsome cedar staircase to the first floor rooms, a ground floor office, strongroom and a basement with its own strongrooms. The interior contains fine finishes such as plaster walls, decorative plaster cornices, pine ceilings, and handsome original cedar joinery including counter, windows, fanlights, architraves, skirtings and substantial doors.

The place is important because of its aesthetic significance.

The building has aesthetic significance for its architectural qualities expressed in the interior craftsmanship and detailing of the joinery and finishes, and for its streetscape value through its form, scale and design which complement other surviving 19th century buildings in the street.

Located on the south-western side of Mary Street, the former Tozer's Building forms part of the harmonious upper Mary Street gold era streetscape of late Victorian commercial buildings dating from the 1880s and 1890s.

The place has a special association with the life or work of a particular person, group or organisation of importance in Queensland's history.

Tozer's Building has a special association with the life and work of Sir Horace Tozer, solicitor, member of the Queensland parliament from 1890, Queensland minister from 1893 to 1898, and Queensland's Agent-General from 1898 to 1909. Resident in Gympie from the first year of the Gympie goldfield, Sir Horace Tozer became an authority on mining law, introduced significant legislation into Queensland parliament and held influential public offices during the course of his career, thereby helping to shape the future of the Colony, and later State, of Queensland and its people.

Tozer's Building was built for [Sir] Horace Tozer and is still known by his name. The legal firm that he established in 1868 and his descendants continued was conducted from Tozer's Building for 94 years, perpetuating his name and connection with the site.
