= Crawford and Co Building =

Queensland, Australia Heritage Building

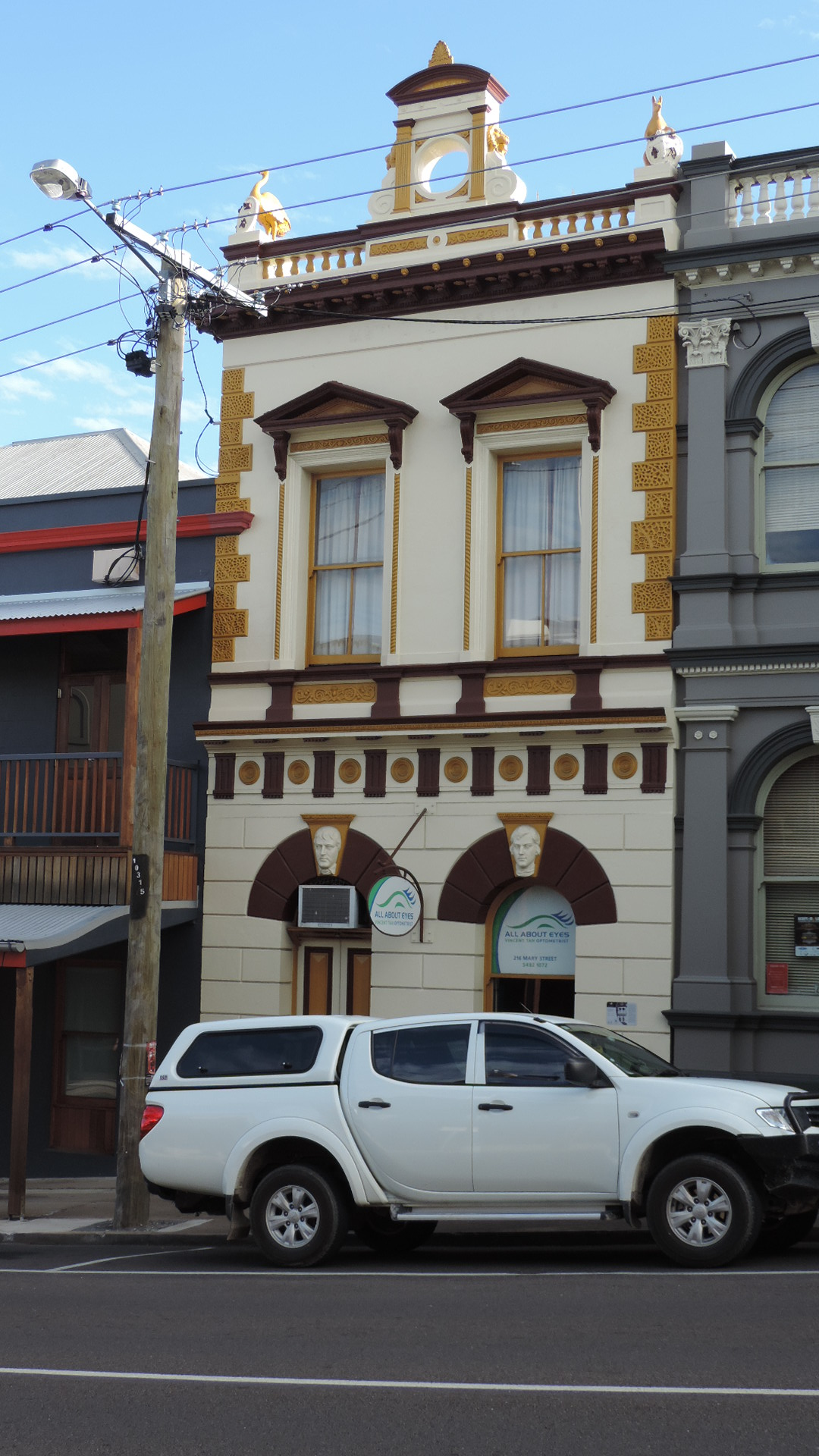
- Former Crawford & Co Building, 2015

- Location within Queensland Location within Australia
- 26.1891°S 152.6591°E
- Location: 216 Mary Street, Gympie, Gympie Region, Queensland, Australia

History
- Design period: 1870s–1890s (late 19th century)
- Built: 1881–1885

Site notes
- Architect: Hugo Durietz
- Architectural style: Eclectic

Queensland Heritage Register
- Official name: Crawford and Co. Building (former), Goldsworthy Building, Caston and Davidson Building, Sym and Jackson Building
- Type: state heritage (built)
- Designated: 15 July 2011
- Reference no.: 602780
- Significant components: office/s

Crawford and Co Building is a heritage-listed commercial building at 216 Mary Street, Gympie, Gympie Region, Queensland, Australia. It was designed by Hugo Durietz and built from 1881 to 1885. It is also known as Goldsworthy Building, Caston and Davidson Building, and Sym and Jackson Building. It was added to the Queensland Heritage Register on 15 July 2011.

== History ==
The former Crawford and Co Building located at 216 Mary Street, Gympie is a two storey, masonry building with basement that was erected in two stages during the 1880s. The second storey was designed by Hugo Durietz in 1885 for James Crawford, who in partnership with Ernest Rohda, conducted his mining, commission agent and share broking business from this building until 1889. Thereafter, the building continued to be occupied by mining secretaries until c. 1924 when the mining industry in Gympie was in serious decline.

Gympie was settled after the discovery of gold in the Mary River district in October 1867. The new goldfield established Queensland as a significant gold producer, contributing much needed finances to the young colony. Thousands of people arrived at the Gympie goldfield in the months after the discovery and a fledgling settlement emerged. In a year the alluvial gold had been exhausted and shallow reef mining commenced. Deep reef mining commenced in 1875 requiring extensive capital investment achieved through the formation of companies. During 1881 mines began yielding large amounts of gold, marking a new era of wealth and prosperity for Gympie as an intensive phase of underground reef mining began, facilitated by the injection of capital into mining companies for machinery and employees.

As Gympie evolved from a hastily established mining settlement, the early makeshift structures of the 1860s gradually gave way to more permanent and substantial public and private buildings from the mid 1870s. The success of deep reef mining from 1875 was reflected in the redevelopment of upper Mary Street during the 1880s and 1890s with substantial commercial buildings such as banks and company secretary and brokers' offices. Several fires – in 1877, 1881 and 1891 – razed the earlier timber buildings and accelerated this transformation.

A fire in August 1881 destroyed all of the buildings between Patterson's brick store and the Bank of New South Wales (242 Mary Street) on the south-western side of Mary Street, Gympie. This included the timber building that had stood on the site of the present-day Crawford and Co Building and which may have been occupied by Samuel Caston, sharebroker, mining secretary and commission agent. Sometime between August 1881 and 1885 a one-storey masonry building was erected.

In October 1885 the property was purchased for £650 by James Crawford, mining secretary, who commissioned architect Hugo Durietz to make additions to the building. The resultant two storey facade is in a Victorian classical style. On 2 March 1889 The Queenslander's Travelling Correspondent described the building of Messrs James Crawford and Co as "most conspicuous, not merely on account of its height, but principally owing to its very elegant and attractive proportions". To him it was: "the most handsome building on the field. Two stories [sic] high with stone front, and tastily ornamented ... the keystones of the main door and window are ornamented with splendidly executed casts of two of Scotland's most popular bards, Burns and Scott; between the lower and upper windows there is a beautifully-worked scroll, the tracery of which interlaces representations of Scotch thistles; and the whole is surmounted by a parapet of bold and attractive designs. On each side of the parapet the British lion, rampant-while rising from the top are models of the emu and kangaroo with shields showing Australia's coat of arms."

This exterior decoration of the Crawford and Co Building represented several cultural influences – the British Empire (lions), Scotland (thistle), the nascent movement towards federation of the Australian colonies which was gaining momentum during the 1880s (kangaroo and emu) and the literary tastes of the owner (Burns and Scott).

The same Queenslander correspondent also described the interior of the building as well planned with ample room for Messrs J Crawford and Co's large broking business.

Extensive deep reef mining in Gympie during the 1880s and 1890s made Gympie Queensland's second and then third biggest gold producer (after Mount Morgan gold production overtook it in 1887). During this period gold production contributed between 21.61 and 35.53 percent of Queensland's export income.

However, the development of deep reef mining required enormous capital. The gold mining industry was the major capital-using sector of the colonial economy. This necessitated company formation to raise capital through sale of shares. The increase in production led to an upsurge in company formation on a massive scale. This growth in gold-mining shares led to the formation of the Gympie Stock Exchange, which specialised completely in trading mining shares.

The presence of sharebrokers engaged in share trading at the Gympie Stock Exchange and of mining secretaries involved in the administration of mines were the natural consequence. Mining secretaries, like company secretaries, ensured that the mining company they represented complied with relevant legislation and regulation, and they kept board members informed of their legal responsibilities. Mining secretaries were the company's named representative on legal documents, and it was their responsibility to ensure that the company and its directors operated within the law. It was also their responsibility to register and communicate with shareholders, to ensure that dividends were paid and company records maintained, such as lists of directors and shareholders, and annual accounts. Sharebrokers were necessary for every transaction on the Gympie Stock Exchange as transactions must be made between two members of the exchange.

James Crawford, mining secretary and sharebroker, arrived in Gympie in 1879 and quickly won the confidence and respect of investors. He was elected to the Gympie Municipal Council in 1887 and held a number of other public positions such as membership of the Gympie Hospital Committee.

However, in August 1889 James Crawford was arrested on a charge of forgery brought by William Davies, who was the director of several mining companies, and to whom Crawford was related by marriage. A Welshman, William Davies was one of the most successful investors on the Gympie goldfield. He arrived in Gympie in the early 1870s and invested in the Lady Mary line of reef, which proved successful. Thereafter he was involved in almost every mine of importance, with his chief interests being in 1 North Glanmire, 4 North Phoenix, Great Eastern and North Smithfield mines. He served on many directorates, was a member of the Widgee Divisional Board, was one of the first directors of the Gympie Gas Company and was also one of the founders of the Royal Bank of Queensland. After James Crawford fled to South Africa in 1889 to escape his trial the building at 216 Mary Street passed to William Davies to whom Crawford had mortgaged it in 1887. Thereafter, the building was rented to other mining secretaries and stockbrokers viz Caston and Davidson (circa1890-circa1914) and then Sym and Jackson (circa1914-circa1919).

Substantial changes in the Queensland mining sector occurred between 1900 and 1913. Gold production in Queensland peaked in 1903, due largely to a final burst of production at Gympie, which was followed by a 60 percent decrease in production between 1903 and 1913 as Gympie (and the other two major Queensland goldfields Charters Towers and Mount Morgan) declined simultaneously. The Gympie field passed through its most profitable period from 1901 to 1906 and in 1903 it recorded an output of 146,000 fine ounces (surpassing Mount Morgan that year). After 1906 the decline that had set in at Gympie in 1904 accelerated.

This downturn in gold production forced the closure of the Stock Exchange c. 1922. Sharebrokers and mining secretaries declined in number as gold mining companies ceased operations. Thomas H Sym whose name, with that of his partner, Jackson, appeared on the parapet of the building was a mining secretary and sharebroker who died during 1925. Thereafter, the building was occupied by optometrists, commencing with William John Hodson who purchased the building in 1924, then Joseph Tilley, followed by Arthur Carvosso (from 1933) and then Peter Goldsworthy who purchased the property in 1973. It continues in this usage.

Additions to the rear were constructed in the 1930s and the upper storey was converted from offices to living space. Also during the 1930s a partition wall between the two rear offices of the 1880s building was removed and some partition walls installed. These partitions were removed in the mid-1970s. In the late 1970s the upper storey reverted to office space with the removal of its kitchen and it has since been used for storage. In 1985 posts were added under the floor as the joists that spanned the full width of the building had sagged. During 1986–87 rotten floorboards on the ground level were replaced and loose plasterwork was repaired or replaced. Other repairs have included: reinstatement of the partition wall between the two offices; replacement of a window in the original rear wall with a reproduction; replacement of step treads in the cedar staircase; replacement of damaged and missing plaster cornice with replica cornice and replacement of the iron roof with Zincalume. The building's address to Reef Street, which gave the only means of accessing the rear of the building, has been retained.

== Description ==
The former Crawford and Co Building is a two storey building with basement built to the front and side alignments of a narrow allotment that extends between Mary and Reef Streets. The building is one of a group of Gympie gold-mining buildings dating from the late nineteenth century on the southern side of the upper slope of Mary Street in Gympie's central business district. It has load-bearing masonry walls supporting a timber-framed roof and floors. Its gabled roof clad with corrugated metal sheeting is concealed behind parapet walls. An elevated timber framed and clad single storey addition is located at the rear of the building and has access to Reef Street.

The former Crawford and Co Building has an ornamental and eclectic Victorian facade featuring many characteristics of the Renaissance style of architecture including pediments, balustraded parapets and low-relief pilasters symmetrically composed around its vertical axis. Each floor space of the building is clearly articulated in the layout of the facade. The impression of strength and solidity is given by a decorative rendered finish. Rusticated quoining has been applied to each end of the building's upper floor and the lower floor has been lined out in imitation of stone ashlar. The entrance door and window opening on the ground floor are arched and feature casts of the heads (of Burns and Scott) on the key stones. A decorative string course with low-relief scrolls interspersed with rosette motifs spans the building between the upper and lower windows.

Window openings on the upper floor containing double hung timber framed sashes are rectangular and crested with pediments supported on decorative scroll brackets. A single winged acroteria remains on the corner of the easternmost pediment. Deep reveals are created with moulded architraves and Scotch thistle motifs are etched below each window sill and framed by short low relief pilasters. The parapet features a deep ornamental cornice supported with scroll-shaped brackets and short balusters set between moulded rails. Surmounting the parapet are raised plinths supporting symbolic statues of a kangaroo (north-western end) and an emu (north-eastern end) with shields housing Australia's coat of arms. A centrally placed monumental pediment, which may once have housed a clockface, is decorated with the British lion, scrolls, low relief pilasters, rosettes and features a carved Scotch thistle at its peak.

The rear parapet wall has a thin rendered finish through which brickwork courses are visible. Within the masonry wall are a triangular window located at the apex of the gabled section and a door and window opening at first floor level contain a sealed timber paneled and glazed door and a tall, rectangular, timber framed, double-hung window with multi-paned sashes.

From Mary Street, a pair of painted, timber paneled doors provides access into a small timber framed and lined entry vestibule which is recessed into and provides access to the building's large foyer space via another pair of timber and glazed paneled swing doors. A tall, arched window with double-hung sashes to the west of the entrance provides natural light to the foyer. The foyer contains a timber staircase to the first floor on the south-eastern wall and south-western wall contains doors to the two rear offices. The rear timber framed addition containing an office, kitchen, bathroom and access to the rear stair is accessed from the former rear door to the building located in the south-eastern office. The first floor level, accessed via a timber staircase, has a similar layout with a small former kitchen and former bedroom at the rear and a larger former living space facing Mary Street.

The internal walls on the upper two levels are lined with plaster while ceilings on both levels are lined with double-beaded tongue and groove pine boards with elaborate cornices using plaster to walls and timber to ceilings. The floors on both levels are covered with carpet. Ceiling roses remain in the upper living room (timber) and in the front foyer (plaster). Internal openings are generous in height and consist of timber-paneled doors with glazed pivoting fanlights above. The original rear door leading into the 1930s addition has patterned and obscure glass panels. The former lower level rear window is still in place and is a multi-paned double-hung timber-framed window. Generous cedar skirting boards, skirting blocks and architraves are located in many areas and the majority of the interior timber work and joinery is clear finished. Original window and door furniture generally survives.

The internal staircase consists of closed risers and treads with elaborate turned balusters and newel posts. The handrail follows the turn of the stairs and the skirting board is also carefully shaped to follow the incline. The underside of the stair is enclosed with timber paneling.

The basement level has an asphalt floor and the perimeter rock, brick and sandstone foundations are visible to the north, east and west walls. Steel posts and a new central beam have recently been added to support the existing bearers spanning the building. Herringbone struts brace the hardwood framing.

The 1930s addition is supported on brick piers and its roof is clad with corrugated metal sheeting. A short flight of timber framed stairs provides access to the rear yard and is covered by a timber framed awning. The rear door is timber paneled with a paint finish and adjacent windows are casements with multi-paned coloured glass. A small louvred window is located to the west. Internal walls are lined with double-beaded tongue and groove board and side walls abut immediately to adjoining buildings. This addition is not considered to be of cultural heritage significance.

== Heritage listing ==
The former Crawford and Co Building was listed on the Queensland Heritage Register on 15 July 2011 having satisfied the following criteria.

The place is important in demonstrating the evolution or pattern of Queensland's history.

The former Crawford and Co Building erected during the 1880s is important in demonstrating the evolution of Gympie gold mining, a major contributor to the wealth of Queensland for nearly 60 years from 1867. As Gympie gold production continued and evolved from alluvial to shallow reef mining to deep reef mining from 1875, this change was reflected in the erection of more permanent and elaborate buildings in the town centre. Erected during the third stage of Gympie mining, the former Crawford and Co Building is indicative of the wealth and permanence of the town.

Its siting near Commissioners Hill in the vicinity of important government and gold-related buildings also illustrates the growth and evolution of Gympie's development. It forms part of the upper Mary Street gold era precinct.

For almost four of the six decades during which Gympie gold helped sustain the Queensland economy the former Crawford and Co Building provided office accommodation for mining secretaries and sharebrokers, who played a critical role in the gold industry after capital-intense deep reef mining became the predominant method of extracting gold deposits.

The place demonstrates rare, uncommon or endangered aspects of Queensland's cultural heritage.

The former Crawford and Co Building possesses a facade design that, in its individual elements and their composition, is uncommon and has always been uncommon. The use of skyline decoration – emu and kangaroo statues bearing shields, picks and shovels; an ornamental central pediment featuring lion's heads, acanthus leaves and egg; and dart mouldings upon a balustraded parapet – plus dissimilar and abundant enrichment to each storey including moulded faces on the keystones of the entrance and ground floor window arches is an idiosyncratic stylist combination.

The place is important in demonstrating the principal characteristics of a particular class of cultural places.

The former Crawford and Co Building is a good example of Victorian-era commercial offices. The original 1880s structure comprises a foyer, handsome cedar staircase to the first floor rooms, a ground floor office and a basement. The interior contains fine finishes such as plaster walls, decorative plaster cornices, pine ceilings, and handsome original red cedar joinery including windows, fanlights, architraves, skirtings and substantial doors.

The place is important because of its aesthetic significance.

The building has aesthetic significance for its architectural qualities expressed in the interior craftsmanship and detailing of the joinery and finishes, and for its streetscape value through its form, scale and design which complement other surviving 19th century buildings in the street. The unique facade of the former Crawford and Co Building evokes astonishment and surprise. It comprises uncommon features and combinations of these features to create unusual compositional qualities.

Located on the south-western side of Mary Street, the former Crawford and Co Building forms part of the pleasing upper Mary Street streetscape dating from the Gympie gold-mining era.
