= Shire of Cooloola =

Coordinates: 26°11′25.20″S 152°39′55.45″E

- Local government area
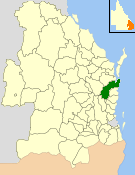
- Location within Queensland

- Country: Australia
- State: Queensland
- Established: 1879 Shire of Widgee; 1880 City of Gympie; 1993 Shire of Cooloola (merged)
- Council seat: Gympie

Area
  - Total: 2,968.8 km^{2} (1,146.3 sq mi)

Population
  - Total: 36,956 (2006 census)
  - Density: 12.4481/km^{2} (32.2405/sq mi)
- Website: Shire of Cooloola
LGAs around Shire of Cooloola
Tiaro	Maryborough (Fraser Island)	Pacific Ocean
Kilkivan	Shire of Cooloola	Noosa
Kilcoy	Kilcoy	Maroochy

The Shire of Cooloola was a local government area located about 170 kilometres (106 mi) north of Brisbane – the state capital of Queensland, Australia. The shire covered an area of 2,968.8 square kilometres (1,146.3 sq mi), and was the product of a merger in 1993 between the City of Gympie and the Shire of Widgee, which had both existed since 1879–1880. It merged with several other LGAs to form the Gympie Region on 15 March 2008.

== History ==
The Cooloola area was originally settled for grazing purposes. The discovery of gold in 1867 lead to a gold rush and the development of the Mary River valley for closer agricultural pursuits.

The Widgee Division was incorporated on 11 November 1879 under the Divisional Boards Act 1879. On 3 July 1886, its western part separately incorporated as the Kilkivan Division. With the passage of the Local Authorities Act 1902, Widgee Division became the Shire of Widgee on 31 March 1903, and on 21 November 1940 moved into new premises, the former Bank of New South Wales building at 242 Mary Street, Gympie.

The Municipal Borough of Gympie was incorporated on 25 June 1880, having previously been the Gympie Division. It held, its first elections on 25 August 1880. A town hall was built in 1890. It became the Town of Gympie under the new Act on 31 March 1903, and on 7 January 1905 was proclaimed the City of Gympie by the Governor of Queensland.

On 19 March 1992, the Electoral and Administrative Review Commission, created two years earlier, produced its report External Boundaries of Local Authorities, and recommended that the City of Gympie and the Shire of Widgee should be amalgamated. The recommendation was implemented through the Local Government (Shire of Cooloola) Regulation 1993 creating the new Shire of Cooloola on 2 November 1993. The first elections were held on 27 November 1993 and Adrian McClintock, the former Widgee chairman, was elected for a four-year term. The former Widgee Shire Council Chambers at 242 Mary Street, Gympie, were used as the Cooloola Shire Council Chambers.

On 15 March 2008, under the Local Government (Reform Implementation) Act 2007 passed by the Parliament of Queensland on 10 August 2007, Cooloola merged with the Shire of Kilkivan and Division 3 of the Shire of Tiaro (Theebine/Gunalda areas) to form the Gympie Region. The former Cooloola Shire Council Chambers are used as the Gympie Regional Council Chambers.

== Wards ==
On its creation, Cooloola was subdivided into four numbered divisions, containing 2, 4, 3 and 3 councillors respectively, plus an elected mayor. Before the 2000 local government elections, Division 2 was reduced to 3 councillors and a new one-councillor Division 5 was created.

== Towns and localities ==
The Shire of Cooloola included the following settlements:

Gympie area:

- Gympie
- Araluen
- Chatsworth
- Glanmire
- Jones Hill
- Kybong
- Monkland
- Southside
- Tamaree
- The Dawn
- Two Mile
- Veteran
- Victory Heights

Widgee area:

- Amamoor
- Brooloo
- Carters Ridge
- Cooloola
- Cooloola Cove
- Dagun
- Glastonbury
- Goomboorian
- Imbil
- Kandanga
- Kia Ora
- Melawondi
- Mothar Mountain
- Moy Pocket
- Pie Creek
- Rainbow Beach
- The Palms
- Tin Can Bay^{1}
- Traveston
- Wolvi

^{1} - split with Fraser Coast Region

== Population ==
Year	Population (Cooloola)	Population (Gympie)	Population (Widgee)
1921	12,095	6,539	5,556
1933	16,435	7,749	8,686
1947	16,247	8,413	7,834
1954	18,103	9,964	8,139
1961	19,042	11,094	7,948
1966	18,769	11,279	7,490
1971	18,055	11,096	6,959
1976	19,520	11,280	8,240
1981	21,960	11,420	10,540
1986	24,400	11,430	12,970
1991	27,773	14,122	13,651
1996	31,736	15,099	16,637
2001	32,989	15,021	17,968
2006	36,070	16,454	19,616

* Numbers in italics relate to non-existing entities.

== Mayors and Chairmen ==
=== Cooloola Shire Chairmen ===
- Mick Venardos OAM (1997–2008)
- Adrian McClintock OAM (1993–1997)

=== Gympie City Mayors ===
- Joan Dodt (1988–1993)
- Mick Venardos (1976–1988)
- James Kidd (1970–1976)
- Ronald Witham (1941–1970)
- Luke Thomas (1937–1941)
- Dr Luther Morris (1931–1937)
- Alexander Glasgow (1930–1931)
- Luke Thomas (1927–1930)
- George Thomas (1924–1927)
- Luke Thomas (1920–1924)
- David Elder Reid (1903–1904)

=== Widgee Shire Chairmen ===
- Adrian McClintock (1979–1993)
- Kevin De Vere (1976–1979), uncle of Australian Prime Minister Kevin Rudd
- Michael MacDonnell (1973–1976)
- William Buchanan (1969–1973)
- William Hubbard Kidd (1924–1969)
- Joseph Tatnell (1921–1924)
