= Glastonbury Division =

Local government area of Queensland, Australia

Coordinates: 26.2140°S 152.5189°E

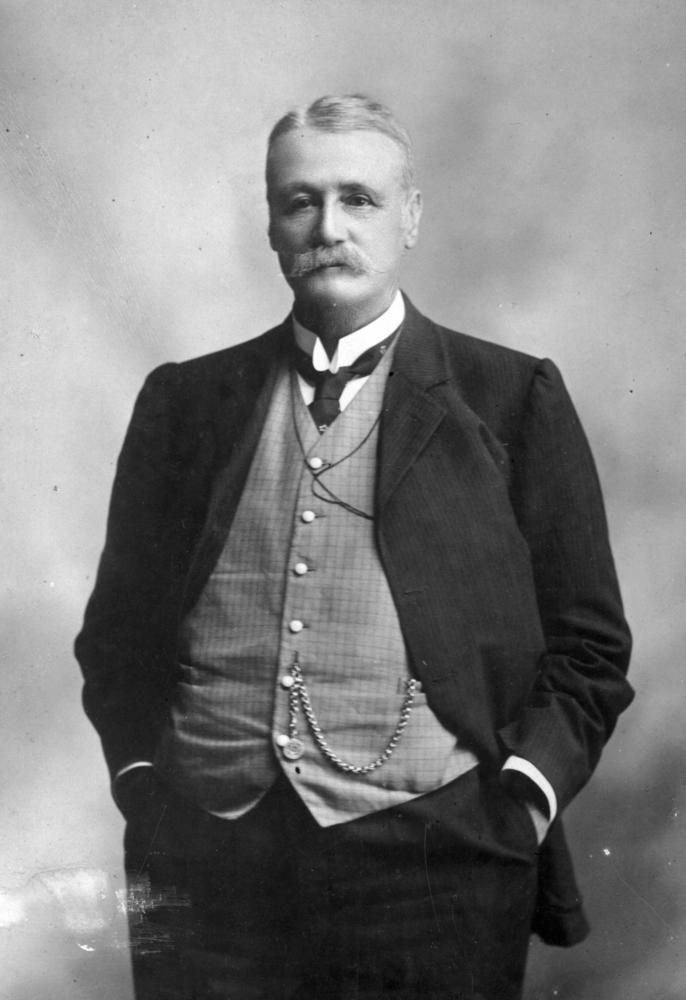
Francis Isidore Power, councillor of the Glastonbury Division

The Glastonbury Division is a former local government area in the Wide Bay–Burnett area of Queensland, Australia. Its headquarters were located in the town of Gympie.

== History ==
The Glastonbury Division was one of the original divisions incorporated on 11 November 1879 under the Divisional Boards Act 1879 with a population of 714.

On 4 January 1895, Glastonbury Division was abolished and split between the Widgee Division and the Borough of Gympie.

== Chairmen ==
- 1880: Mr Hickson
