= Baptist Church, Ipswich =

Baptist Church, Ipswich (former)
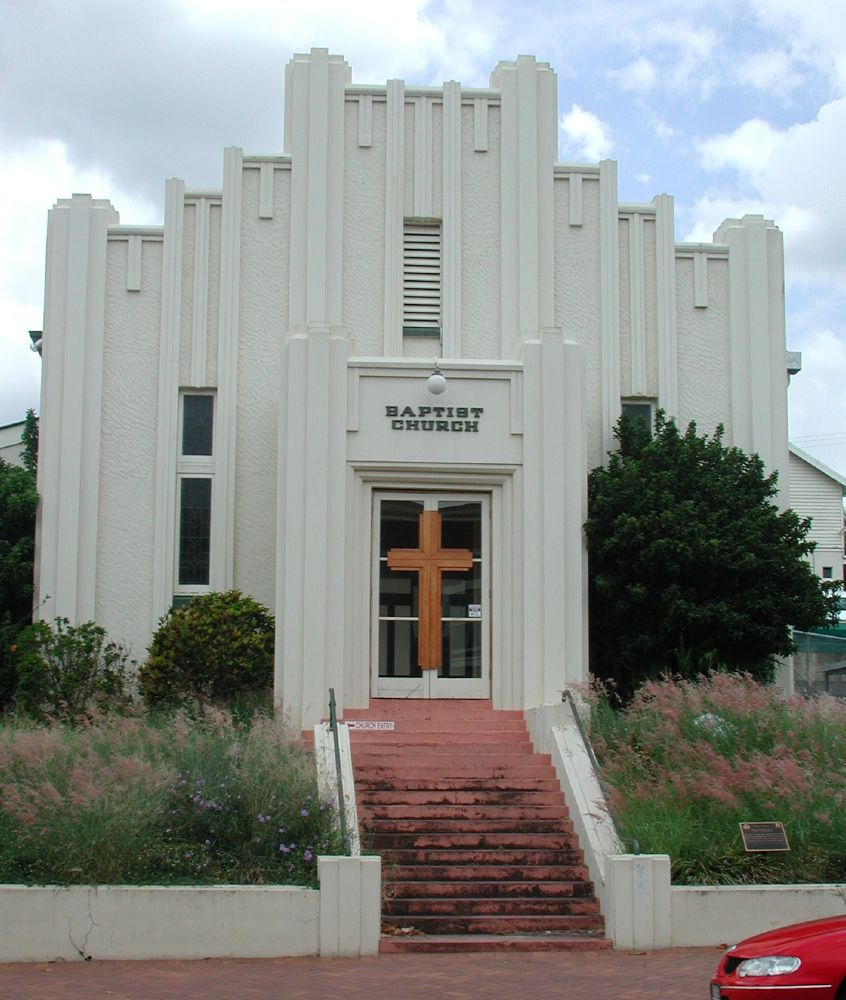
- Former Baptist Church and Memorial Gate
- Baptist Church, Ipswich (former)
- 27.6148°S 152.755°E
- Address: 188 Brisbane Street, Ipswich, City of Ipswich, Queensland
- Country: Australia
- Previous denomination: Baptist

History
- Status: Church (1877–2004); Entertainment venue (since 2012)
- Founded: 11 December 1876
- Founder(s): Mr E. Gregory and Rev. J. Straughen
- Dedicated: 17 June 1877

Architecture
- Architects: Richard Gailey (1877); George Brockwell Gill (1938)
- Architectural type: Church (former)
- Style: Gothic Revival (1877); Art Deco (1938)
- Years built: 1877–1954
- Closed: 2004 (as a church)

Specifications
- Capacity: 350 people
- Length: 25 metres (82 ft)
- Width: 9.8 metres (32 ft)
- Height: 5.5 metres (18 ft)

Queensland Heritage Register
- Official name: Baptist Church and Memorial Gate (former), Ipswich, Studio 188, Former Ipswich Baptist Church & memorial gates, Central Baptist Church, Ipswich
- Type: State heritage (landscape, built)
- Designated: 4 July 2006
- Reference no.: 602573
- Significant period: 1870s, 1930s (historical)
- Significant components: Stained glass window/s, views to, memorial — gate/s, church, baptistry
- Builders: Messrs MacGregor and Brown, Messers Mackenzie and Co.

Baptist Church is a heritage-listed former Baptist church at 188 Brisbane Street, Ipswich, City of Ipswich, Queensland, Australia. It began as a simple gabled Gothic Revival building designed by Richard Gailey built in 1877, which was given an Art Deco makeover in 1938, designed by George Brockwell Gill. A memorial gate was added in 1954.

In 2007 the site was sold, and the building converted for use as a performing arts space, known as Studio 188. It was added to the Queensland Heritage Register on 4 July 2006.

== History ==
The former Ipswich Baptist Church, first designed by eminent Queensland architect, Richard Gailey and erected in 1877 on Brisbane Street, was originally a simple gabled brick building in a classical idiom. The church acquired adjacent land on Limestone Street and established a Sunday School hall and a manse there. An Art Deco-influenced refurbishment of the church was completed in 1938 under the direction of prolific Ipswich architect, George Brockwell Gill. A gateway comprising a gable roof supported on barley-twist columns was opened by the church in 1954 to honour those from the church who fought, suffered and died during World War II, and to provide an entrance to memorial grounds established next to the church on Brisbane Street. In 2004 the congregation established itself elsewhere and the church was sold to eventually be transformed into a performance venue by the Ipswich City Council in 2012.

=== Establishment of the congregation ===
Ipswich was one of the earliest settlements in Queensland, commencing as a convict out-station known as Limestone in 1827. From its inception as a free settlement in 1842, Ipswich was important as a port on the Bremer River located at the intersection of routes to the Darling Downs and Upper Brisbane Valley. Its people, together with many squatters, cherished the hope that the town might become the capital of the prospective Colony of Queensland, however, Brisbane assumed that role after separation from New South Wales in 1859. Nevertheless, Ipswich remained important as a major regional centre, being declared a municipality in 1860 and then a city in 1904.

The Ipswich Baptist congregation was the second to be formed in Queensland. Initially the colony's first Baptists met in Brisbane as part of a United Evangelical Church formed in 1849 under the leadership of Reverend Charles Stewart, a Baptist minister, and including Presbyterians and Congregationalists. After the retirement of Stewart in December 1854, the Baptists separated from the union, forming an independent congregation in Brisbane in August 1855.

At Ipswich, the Baptists initially held combined services with the Congregational Church from the early 1850s. They commenced meeting independently in June 1859 in a hired bowling alley, and in January the following year officially formed a Baptist church with 7 members.

=== First church building ===
The congregation built its first church in August 1860: a small chapel constructed in the West Street garden of the church's first pastor, Rev. Thomas Deacon (he died shortly before the chapel's opening). In the mid-1870s, after Rev. J. Straughen took office, the congregation experienced a surge in numbers growing from 38 in August 1875 to 78 in December 1876. During 1876 it became clear that the West Street chapel was too small, and the decision was made to erect a new church building. The Rev. Deacon's widow generously gifted the first chapel, and its site including the house, to the church trustees on the condition that they were used by them in Ipswich. Ultimately that property was sold and another on the main street of town was purchased for a new church.

=== Second church building ===
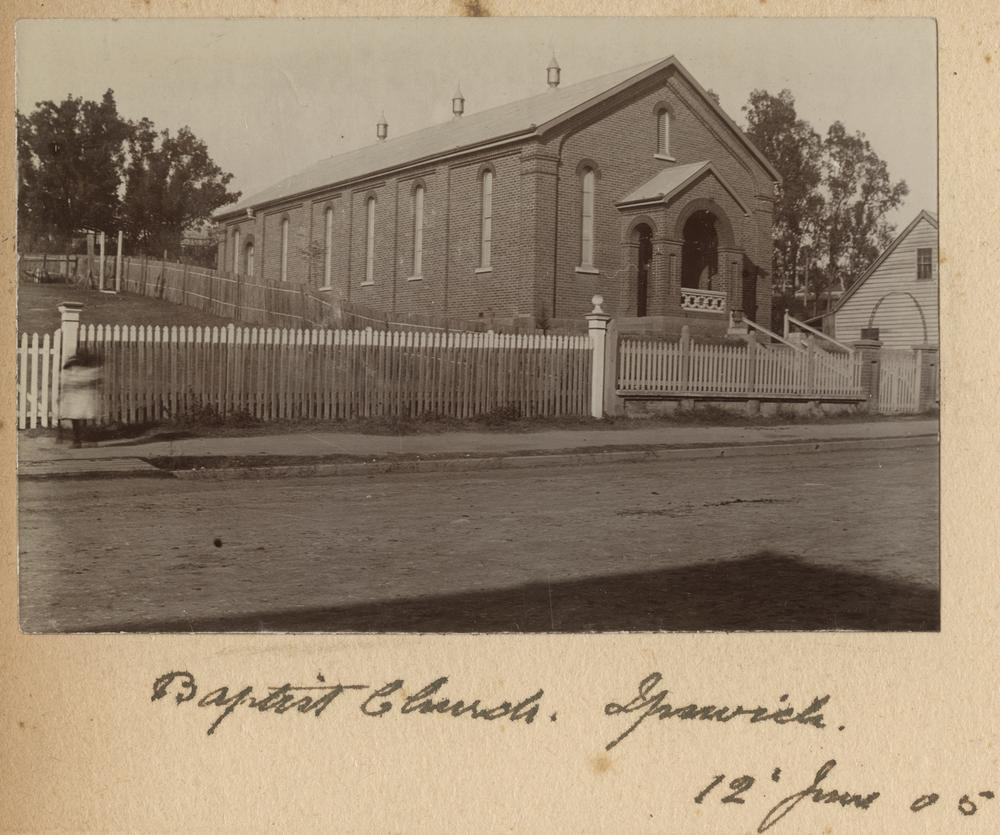
The Baptist Church in 1905

Tenders for the new church were invited in The Queensland Times on 7 October 1876. The firm Messers McKenzie and Co. was contracted for the brickwork and Messrs MacGregor and Brown for the woodwork.

The architect responsible for the design was Richard Gailey, who was a devout Baptist and would become Brisbane's longest-practising and most prolific private architect of the colonial era. Born in Ireland, Gailey trained to be an architect in Derry before travelling to Queensland in 1864 and deciding to settle here. He set up as an architect the following year and by 1868 was prospering to a degree that enabled him to marry a woman from Belfast. It is apparently after his wife's conversion to the Baptist faith, that he became a member at the Wharf Street church in Brisbane. For most of the work he did for the Baptists, he gave his services for free; the grandest monument he created for them being the Baptist City Tabernacle on the corner of Wickham Terrace and Upper Edward Street in Brisbane, built in 1889–90. His other notable works include: the Brisbane Courier Building in Brisbane's CBD (1885–87, now demolished), the Regatta Hotel at Toowong (1886), School House at Brisbane Grammar School (1887), the Smellie and Co. warehouse opposite the Brisbane Botanic Gardens (1888–89), the former Bank of New South Wales in Gympie (1890–91), Moorlands at the Wesley Hospital site at Auchenflower (1892) and the Walter Reid and Co. warehouse in Rockhampton (1892–93). At his death in 1924 at the age of 90 he was described as the "Doyen of Brisbane Architects" by The Brisbane Courier.

The Ipswich church was the fourth of at least eight churches or chapels he designed for the Baptists during their greatest period of expansion between 1865 and 1890, and is now the oldest extant one in its original location. The only older church is that in Chapel Street in Nundah, which was built in 1876 to a design by Gailey but later moved from its original site on Fortescue Street in Spring Hill. The simplicity of the Ipswich church design — gable-roofed brick building with engaged piers, round-arched windows filled with stained, leadlight glass (red border and green lights) and gabled porch with decorative balustrade - was typical of Gailey's early work for the Baptists, which otherwise tended to be in timber. His later churches, most notably the City Tabernacle and the Baptist Church on Flinders Parade at Sandgate (1887), are more complex, reflecting the increased strength of the church and the capacity of the congregations they served.

On the Separation Day public holiday, 11 December 1876, Rev. J. Straughen presided over a ceremony for laying the foundation stone of the new Ipswich church. A sealed bottle containing Ipswich newspapers and clippings, and a copy of a report read at the ceremony by the church secretary, Mr J. Fletcher, were put into a prepared place under the foundation stone. Mr E. Gregory, a foundation member of the Baptist church in Ipswich who was also responsible for establishing the Ipswich Herald (later The Queensland Times) laid the foundation stone. He used an ivory handled silver trowel, still held by the Ipswich Baptist Church, and engraved by Mr McCuskie of the North Ipswich railway workshops. (Note: The trowel is still held by the church congregation and was part of a celebration of its 150th anniversary in 2009.)

The church was officially opened just over 6 months later on 17 June 1877. It was approximately 25 by 9.8 metres (82 by 32 ft) in plan and about 5.5 metres (18 ft) high (at the top of its gable) with a corrugated iron roof and a floor of milled boards. Contemporary descriptions of the church state that it could accommodate 350 people. The classical style employed in its design was common in 19th-century commercial and government buildings but relatively rare in churches. Where the classical style was used for a church, it was often by non-conforming denominations such as the Baptists. (Note: FDG Stanley designed the Holy Rosary Catholic Church in Bundaberg (corner of Barolin and Woongarra streets) in 1886–88 as a classically inspired temple.)

The interior of the Ipswich church followed a layout that was typical of those for a Baptist congregation: designed around a symbolic axis, a raised dais was located in the centre of the southern end with a baptismal font, a fundamental part of Baptist worship, immediately beneath it. The pews were arranged symmetrically about the axis in front of the dais and the font.

The new church was completed during a period of economic buoyancy and increased building activity in Ipswich, the colony's "second town" according to the 1876 edition of the Australian Handbook. Queensland had experienced severe economic depression in 1866 with only gradual improvement occurring over the following decade. As the economy improved during the late 1870s, Ipswich entered a period of prosperity. In July 1877, The Queensland Times noted a considerable number of buildings planned, under construction or recently completed including the Lands Office, a new benevolent asylum (Ipswich Mental Hospital) and the Queensland Woollen Manufacturing Company mill. The city's retail and commercial heart centred on Brisbane Street and the area west of Nicholas Street known as "Top of the Town".

=== Subsequent improvements ===
Baptist Sunday School had commenced at Ipswich by 1864. During 1900 a timber hall for that purpose was built facing Limestone Street on land acquired by the church. This building was designed by local architect, George Brockwell Gill. Funds for the hall, together with those to enable renovations to the church also carried out in 1900, were raised from bazaars, interest free loans and donations. The Ladies Work Society played a prominent role in fundraising through the sale of their craft work. In 1924 a manse was opened next to the hall and to the rear of the church.

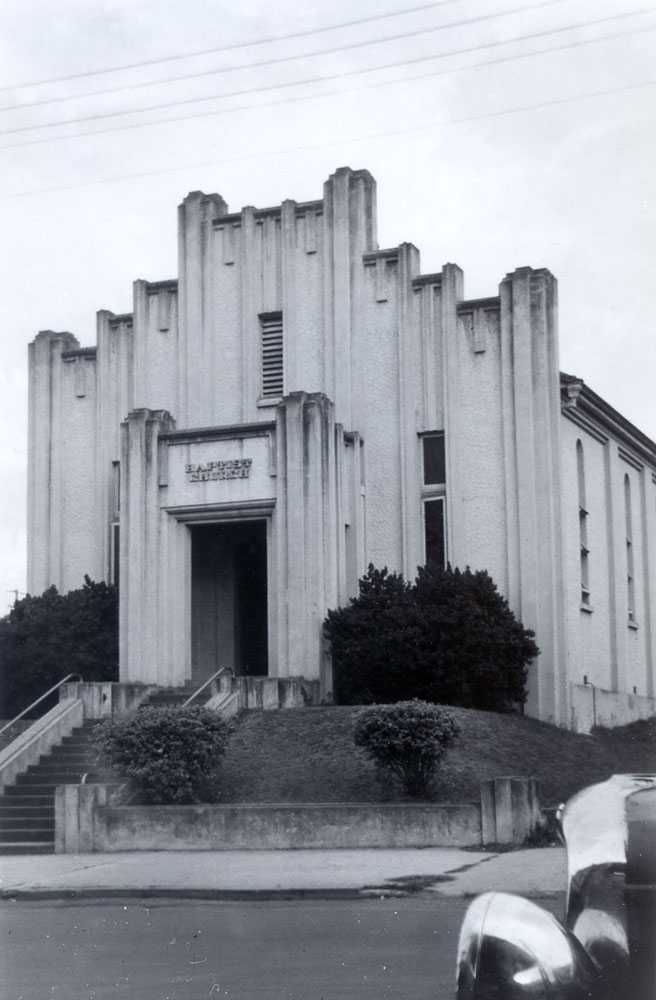
Ipswich Baptist Church after Art Deco renovation, 1940s

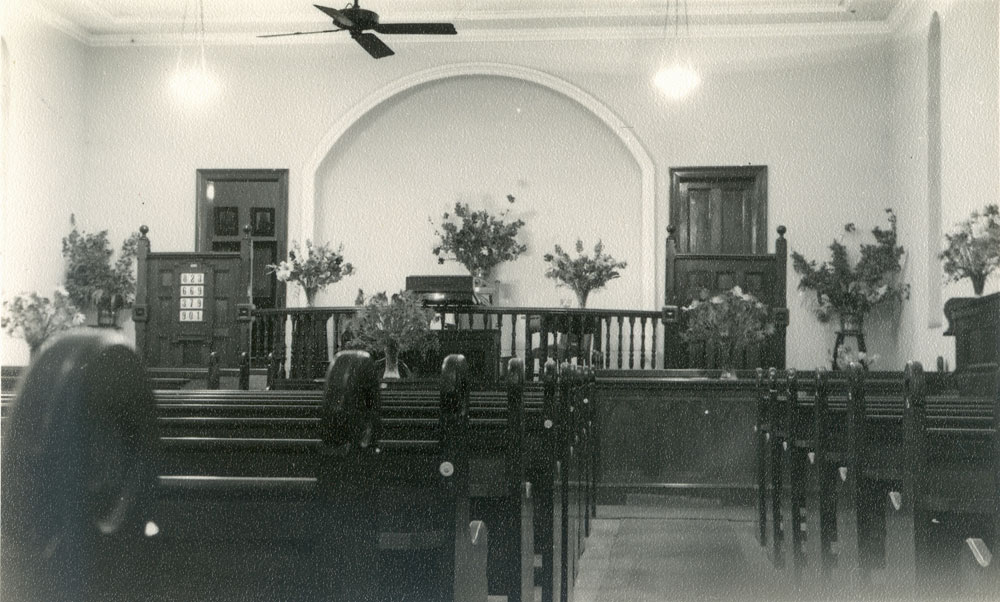
Ipswich Baptist Church interior, 1940s

After World War I and years of depression when congregation finances were limited, a scheme to substantially renovate the church was put forward in 1937 during the pastoral term of Rev. Gray A Parker. By the following year the remodelled church was complete, its "futuristic and perpendicular" facade in an Art Deco style that was popular between the world wars but unusual in churches. The front porch was completely replaced and fitted with stained glass, leadlight windows, with matching ones in the front wall, and all of the exterior walls were rendered. The interior alterations included a full-width polished timber vestibule with stained glass, leadlight windows (now removed, matching the design of other new windows in the facade and featuring an arrow and torch motif) and panelling of the vestry with polished timber. The design was completed by GB Gill, the architect for the Sunday School nearly 40 years previously, while the contractor was Mr HE Wildey. Dedication of the renovated church took place on 19 June 1938, when a number of pieces of church furniture were donated: a pulpit table, Communion chair, 2 pulpit chairs, oak hymn-board, crystal vases, pedestal and pulpit hymn book.

Born in London, Gill emigrated to the colonies in 1886 before settling in Ipswich, taking over an existing practice (Note: Gill took over the practice of Samuel Shenton, who was also Mayor of Ipswich City Council from 1871 to 1872 and again in 1889. Shenton was the uncle of the grandson of the first Ipswich Baptist pastor, Reverend Thomas Deacon.) and establishing himself as an active member of the community for over 50 years before his retirement in 1943. Gill was elected Associate of the Queensland Institute of Architects in 1904 and Fellow by 1913. He was its vice-president from 1914 to 1916 and president from 1918 to 1919.

His early works include Brynhyfryd, a grand residence at Blackstone for Lewis Thomas (1889–90), and the original building of Ipswich Girls' Grammar School (1890–91), for which he served as a member of the Board of Trustees and later was board Chairman. Later, more outstanding works in Ipswich, include the City View Hotel (1908), the Cribb and Foote department store (1911) and the Soldiers' Memorial Hall in Nicholas Street (1921). Of the 16 buildings and two memorials Gill designed that are entered in the Queensland Heritage Register, the Ipswich Club House (1898) and the Hotel Metropole, a block further west of the church on Brisbane Street (1906), are notable examples of his skill with large timber houses and polychrome brickwork respectively.

The Art Deco-inspired refurbishment of the Ipswich Baptist Church is stylistically very different from Gill's other work, and it is plausible that he or a member of his office took inspiration from his work in supervising the construction of the Walter Burley Griffin Incinerator (now a theatre) in 1936 at Queens Park in Ipswich. (Note: This is the only example of Griffin's work in Queensland.) Early in 1937, the year in which the church refurbishment was being planned, Walter Burley Griffin died unexpectedly aged 60 years while working in India.

The allotment adjacent to the church, purchased by the Baptists in about 1940, was dedicated as a war memorial in 1950 by which time it had come to be used informally as a park. The Rev. J. H. Bird, who had come to the pastorate in 1947, led a group of volunteers in terracing the area and laying its grass. Concrete steps were set into the terraced faces. On 25 March, the Ipswich Mayor, Alderman J. T. Finimore, officially opened the park as the Central Baptist War Memorial Grounds. (Note: JT Finimore's mother died in Ipswich in 1937 and belonged to the Central Baptist Church)

The memorial entrance to the park, a covered gateway with a plaque and wrought iron gates, was erected 4 years after the park was opened and dedicated by Rev. H Kestell Cornish on 25 April 1954. During the ceremony, the entire congregation led by ex-servicemen filed slowly through the gates. The memorial plaque bore the words "A tribute of remembrance to the men and women of this church who fought, suffered and died during the 1939-45 war" and was mounted on the front gable.

With a view to the approaching centenary of the Ipswich Baptist congregation, renovations were again undertaken in 1958. The church ceiling had to be replaced, the interior was painted and a cross (now removed) was installed in the apse on the rear wall. The refurbished church was reopened on 15 February 1959.

More changes took place in 1979. The platform area in the church was improved and a larger courtyard area was provided at the entrance. A sealed parking area was also established on the top terrace at this time (between the rear of the church and Baptist buildings on Limestone Street).

The final alterations to be made to the church by the Baptists were in the late 1990s. Between 1993 and 1994, a larger entrance was made into the church on its eastern side. A large covered area was added to this extension in 1998.

== Sale of the site ==
In 2004, the Baptists sold the church complex and built a new place of worship in the Ipswich suburb of Brassall. The former church stood vacant for a number of years, becoming a target for vandals, before McDonald's Australia Limited purchased it along with the other properties that had constituted the former Baptist Complex with its church and memorial ground on Brisbane Street, and the Sunday School hall and manse on Limestone Street.

In 2009, McDonald's demolished the hall and manse, and built a retaining wall between that site and the memorial ground and church, in order to construct a restaurant and car park on Limestone Street. It transferred the memorial ground, gate and church to Ipswich City Council in 2012; council then carrying out a substantial refurbishment of the site to create a youth theatrical venue called Studio 188 that operates as an adjunct to the Ipswich Civic Centre. The design for the transformation of the church and its grounds were completed by Gibson Architects, an Ipswich firm.

== Description ==
The former Baptist Church and memorial gate stand at 188 Brisbane Street in an area of Ipswich called Top of the Town. The former is a rendered brick building with an Art Deco-influenced front elevation comprising a series of engaged piers and a porch, and a gabled, corrugated iron-clad roof; while the gate stands a few metres to the north against the street and consists of a gable roof supported on 6 barley-twist columns. The former church is set back from the street alignment and is raised above it by the steep slope of the site. Its visual dominance of the surrounding area is further embellished by the backdrop provided by the open space behind the memorial gate.

Entrance to the church is gained 3 ways: up a tall flight of concrete stairs to the front porch; through the memorial gate and up to a side extension via a recent stairway, and via a ramp that runs from the street and zigzags up the slope to the extension entrance. The sloping ground behind the gate and in front of the former church — cut through by the recently constructed interconnecting stair and ramp — is landscaped with beds of low shrubs and shaded by a number of trees. A concrete retaining wall separating the former church site from that at the rear, which addresses Limestone Street, forms a striking backdrop. A driveway providing access to premises on Limestone Street runs beside the south-western side of the church and is outside the heritage boundary for this place.

The Art Deco-inspired front elevation of the church is the key feature introduced as part of GB Gill's 1938 refurbishment and is made up of a series of engaged piers forming a parapet wall to the main face of the church and repeated in style on its porch. The detailing of the larger piers at each end and framing the centre, along with the smaller piers in the bays created by these, emphasises verticality, as well as solidity. The pattern of render is smooth for the piers and other built-up details, and rough cast in the bays. Double, glass-panelled entrance doors, approached by a flight of concrete steps from the footpath, provide access through the porch. A stained timber Latin cross is fixed to exterior of the door mullions. Tall, narrow windows with no arch at their heads and filled with coloured lead lights, open either side of the porch. Above it, as well in each porch side wall, there are shorter windows of otherwise similar dimensions. The central one is filled with fixed louvres. A set of stained timber, double doors open from the porch into the interior. These are high-waisted with coloured leadlight windows set into each top panel, the design of which features a narrow border, green background lights and a central arrow and torch motif. This patterning is extant in many of the early windows facing Brisbane Street.

The south-western elevation of the church, facing the driveway, has changed little from that designed by Gailey: 6 bays framed with shallow engaged piers connected top and bottom, the first 5 punctuated by tall, narrow windows with round-arches and sills, and that at the rear featuring both a narrow window, shorter than the others because of the sloping land, and a timber door with semicircular fanlight. The bays are rough cast render while the frame is smooth render. The windows are filled with 4 coloured lead lights, 3 of which pivot along the horizontal centre line. The rear elevation is again Gailey's design, rendered in a similar pattern with a rough cast face framed by smooth-rendered, engaged piers at each corner curving to the top plate connecting them under the gable end. A small, narrow window with round-headed arch and fixed louvres opens high into the centre of this wall.

The north-eastern elevation has a gable and hip roof extension appended to it (1994), made of rendered concrete block and timber roof framing with a suspended ceiling. A number of early windows taken from the church wall removed to make way for this extension have been in it. The extension fits generally inside the first and last wall bays of the earlier church. The leadlight glass used in all the original tall, narrow side windows features green rectangular lights inside a narrow red and then yellow border. The side entrance to the former church features a large set of double timber doors surrounded by a glazed frame.

The interior of the former church comprises the extension on the eastern side of the building where front-of-house facilities have been inserted, the former worship hall, which is now the theatre, and some back-of-house facilities in the southern part of the building where the vestry and flower room had been. The theatre space has a new stage at the southern end, behind which the proscenium wall stands with former door openings behind a black curtain. The walls and ceilings feature a regular grid of steel lighting gantries and the original windows are behind coloured screens, set off the wall by approximately 10 centimetres (3.9 in).

The memorial gate stands on the alignment with the street and comprises a gable roof, framed in timber, lined on the ends with weatherboards, and clad in corrugated metal sheeting. The roof is supported on 6 barley-twist columns with ionic capitals and founded on a low wall.

A low concrete wall, styled to resemble the front elevation of the church, runs the length of the allotment boundary with the street and footpath. It opens to allow access onto the site, with short piers at the entrance to the gate, the ramp, and the stairs leading to the former church (from north to south along Brisbane Street). A sign has been installed near to the ramp entrance (2012), which is not considered to be of cultural heritage significance. The new stair and ramp, and the landscaping in the area of the memorial ground behind the gate are not of cultural heritage significance.

== Heritage listing ==
The former Ipswich Baptist Church was listed on the Queensland Heritage Register on 4 July 2006 having satisfied the following criteria.

The place is important in demonstrating the evolution or pattern of Queensland's history.

Constructed in 1877 to a design by renowned architect, Richard Gailey, and given its Art Deco-inspired exterior in 1938 by prolific local architect, George Brockwell Gill, the former Ipswich Baptist Church is the oldest Baptist church known to survive in its original location in Queensland; as such it is physical evidence of the early establishment and later strength of the Baptist congregation in Ipswich. Being the church of only the state's second congregation of Baptists, it also demonstrates the importance of Ipswich as a regional centre during the late 1870s.

The war memorial gate, located adjacent to the former church, is important in demonstrating the pattern of Queensland's history, being associated with the nationwide movement to honour those involved in conflicts such as World War II.

The place demonstrates rare, uncommon or endangered aspects of Queensland's cultural heritage.

The Ipswich church is the oldest known surviving Baptist church still in its original location in Queensland.

The Art Deco elevational treatment, applied to the church in 1938 when it was remodelled to a design by Ipswich architect, George Brockwell Gill, is rare for buildings of this type in Queensland; indicative of a preference among non-conforming churches for adopting an architectural style distinct from those employed in Roman Catholic and Anglican churches.

The place is important in demonstrating the principal characteristics of a particular class of cultural places.

The former Ipswich Baptist Church is important as an example of the early work of Richard Gailey, Brisbane's longest practising and most prolific private architect of the colonial era. It was the fourth of at least 8 churches Gailey designed for the Baptists, a body of work which culminated in the City Tabernacle in Brisbane (1889, Baptist City Tabernacle), the denomination's principal place of worship in Queensland. The simplicity and restraint of the Ipswich church's design is typical of Gailey's early work for the Baptists, his later churches being far more decorative.

The church's 1938 Art Deco remodelling is important as an unusual example of the work of prominent Ipswich architect George Brockwell Gill. A resident and active community member of Ipswich where almost all of his work was done, Gill's career spanned more than 50 years from the 1880s. Fourteen of his works in Ipswich alone are entered in the Queensland Heritage Register.

The memorial gate is important in demonstrating the principal characteristics of a commemorative structure located in a prominent place to act as a tangible and enduring reminder of those men and women from the church who fought, suffered and died during World War II.

The place is important because of its aesthetic significance.

The former Ipswich Baptist church and its memorial gate are important for the significant aesthetic contribution they make to the streetscape of Brisbane Street, one of Ipswich's most important thoroughfares. The verticality of its Art Deco front elevation — set back and raised up from the street with the slope of the site, and standing against a backdrop of open space behind the memorial gate — is visually striking. The aesthetic of the former church and its memorial gate is in strong contrast to the area's commercial character.
