= Bank of New South Wales building, Gympie =

Bank of New South Wales Building, Gympie
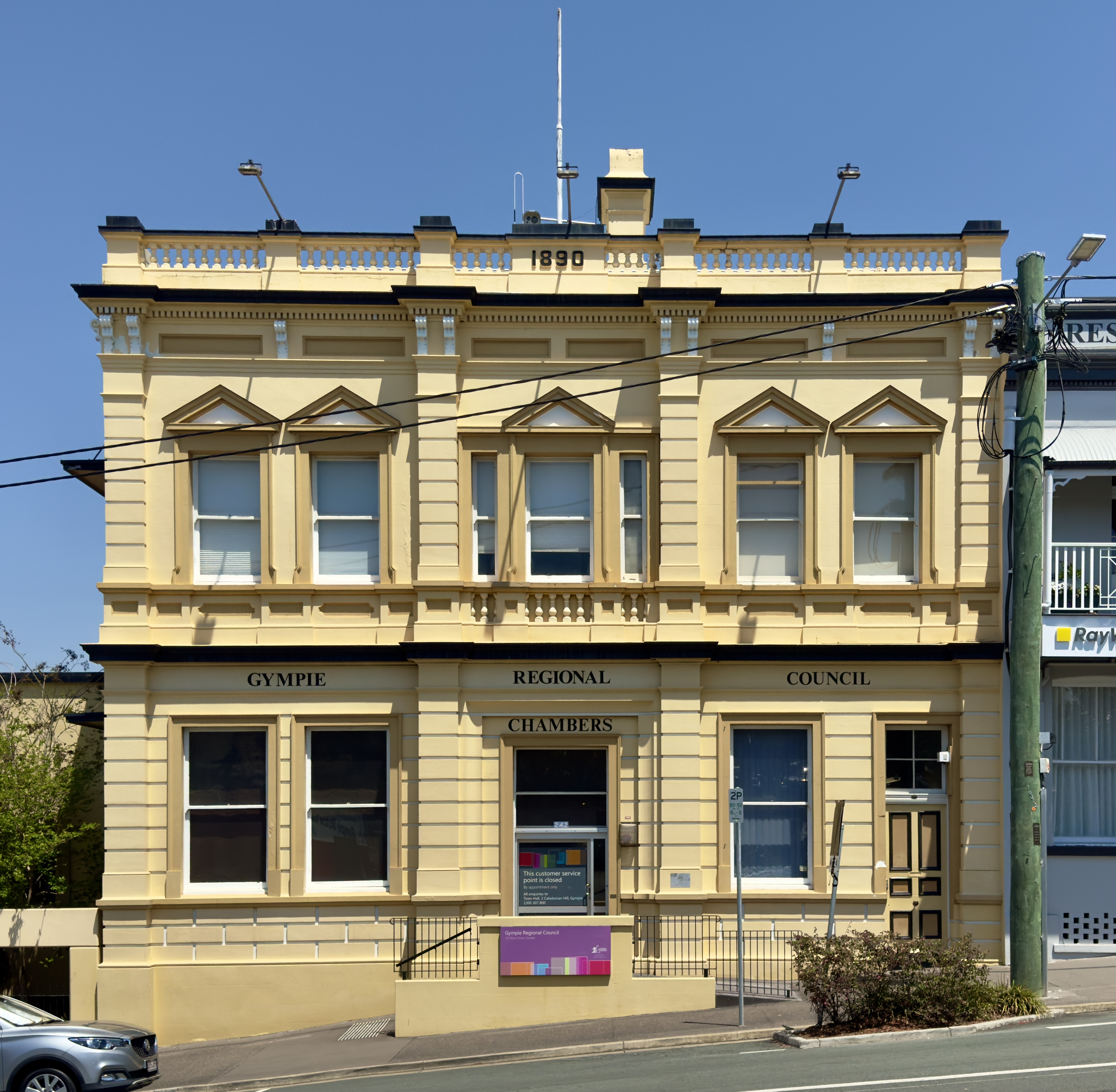
- Bank of New South Wales Building, 2011

- Location within Queensland Location within Australia
- 26.1888°S 152.6585°E
- Location: 242 Mary Street, Gympie, Gympie Region, Queensland, Australia

History
- Design period: 1870s–1890s (late 19th century)
- Built: 1890–1891

Site notes
- Architect: Richard Gailey
- Architectural style: Classicism

Queensland Heritage Register
- Official name: Bank of New South Wales (former)
- Type: state heritage (built)
- Designated: 15 April 2011
- Reference no.: 602775
- Significant period: 1890–1940
- Significant components: bank
- Builders: T. Kelly

The Bank of New South Wales is a heritage-listed former bank at 242 Mary Street, Gympie, Gympie Region, Queensland, Australia. It was designed by Richard Gailey and built from 1890 to 1891 by T. Kelly. It is also known as Widgee Shire Council Chambers, Coolooa Shire Council Chambers and Gympie Regional Council Chambers. It was added to the Queensland Heritage Register on 15 April 2011.

== History ==
The former Bank of New South Wales building located in upper Mary Street, Gympie was designed by Richard Gailey and built in 1890–1891. This two-storey neo-classical building was purpose-built as the Gympie branch of the Bank of New South Wales, which had been operating at the Gympie goldfield since March 1868. It comprised ground floor banking facilities, upper floor manager's residence and a basement.

Gympie (initially known as Nashville) was established after the discovery of gold in the Mary River district in October 1867. The new goldfield turned Queensland into a significant gold producer, contributing much-needed finances to the young colony. Thousands of people arrived at the Gympie goldfield in the months after the discovery and a fledgling settlement emerged. In a year the alluvial gold had been exhausted and shallow reef mining commenced.

As Gympie evolved from a hastily established mining settlement, the early makeshift structures of the 1860s gradually gave way to more permanent and substantial public and private buildings from the mid-1870s. With the change to deep reef mining from 1875, came the need for extensive capital investment through the formation of companies using foreign as well as local capital. During 1881, mines began yielding large amounts of gold, marking a new era of wealth and prosperity for Gympie as an intensive phase of underground reef mining began, facilitated by the injection of capital into mining companies for machinery and employees. The influx of money and the resultant yield of gold was reflected in the redevelopment of upper Mary Street during the 1880s and 1890s with substantial commercial buildings such as banks, company secretaries' and brokers' offices. One of these was the Bank of New South Bank building, which opened in 1891.

The Bank of New South Wales (BNSW) was the first bank established in Australia (February 1817) but it was restricted to trading in Sydney until 1850. After restructure in that year it opened its first branch outside Sydney, in Brisbane, on 14 November 1850. It expanded rapidly thereafter with the rush of gold discoveries in New South Wales and Victoria. The bank set up agencies and gold-buying agents at each new diggings to spread its network and consolidate its position. Bank officers were urged on by their superiors to be the first to a new location to set up a gold-buying agency. By 1861 the BNSW had grown from a single Sydney office in 1850 to a network of 37 branches in Australia and New Zealand.

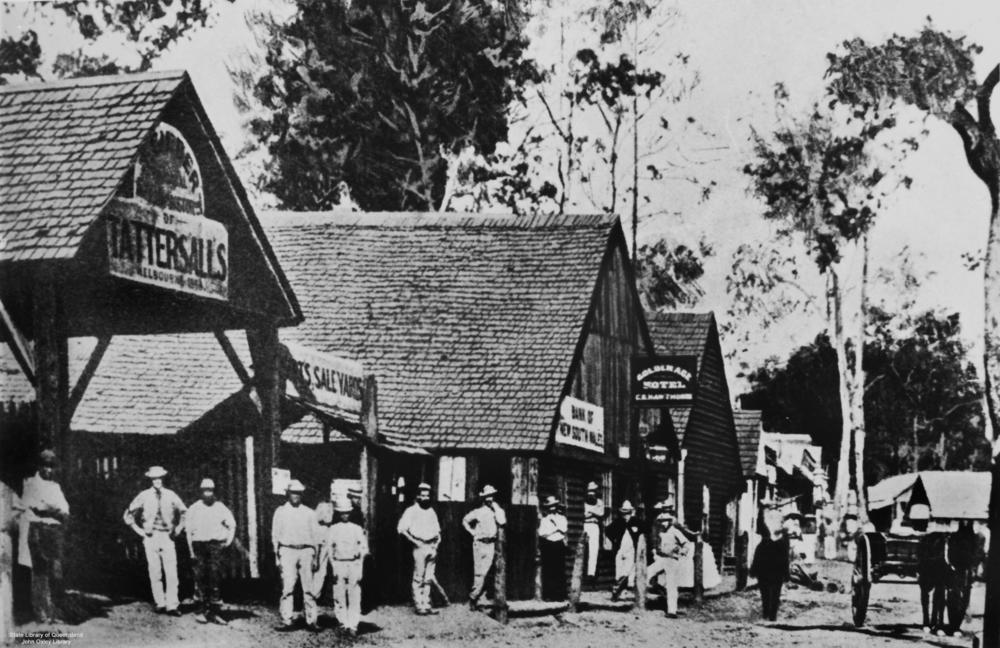
Lower Mary Street (the bank is 3rd from left), 1868

Subsequently, with the discovery of gold at Gympie the Bank opened an agency on the goldfield on 21 March 1868, less than six months after the goldfield's establishment. In the same year, the bank transferred to a building owned by Merry and Davis. An 1868 photograph of lower Mary Street, Gympie shows the Bank of New South Wales operating from a weatherboard-clad building with a shingle roof.

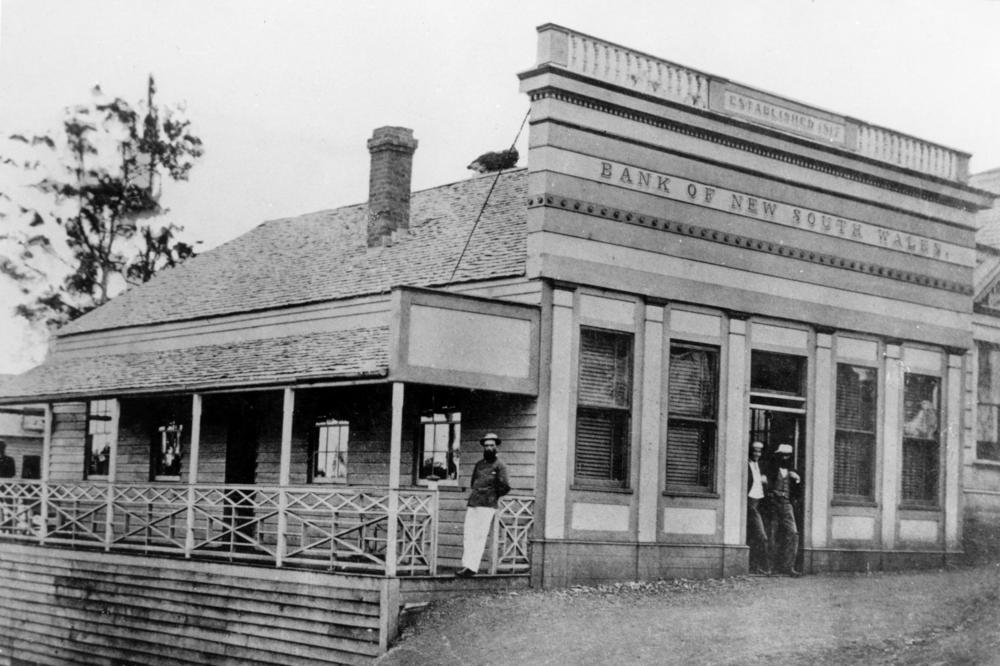
The bank, 1872

Over the ensuing years, as it became increasingly clear that the Gympie goldfield was a long-term proposition, a series of steps towards permanency were taken by the bank reflecting this longevity. Firstly, in 1872 the BNSW agency converted to a branch with the increased banking services that entailed.

Secondly, in 1879 the bank purchased the 22 perches (560 m^{2}) allotment on which the current building stands and occupied the timber and tin building on the site until selling it prior to the building of the current structure. Thirdly, the decision at the end of the 1880s to build a masonry building followed the growth of deep reef mining on the goldfield and the rise in Gympie's gold output throughout the decade.

The 1880s were a decade of rapid growth and development and rising land prices in Queensland. Mainly due to Queensland's three major gold mining centres - Gympie, Charters Towers and Mount Morgan - the value of gold output rose from £698,000 in 1883 to £2.75 million in 1889, exceeding the value of exported wool. Gold production contributed between 21.61 and 35.53 percent of Queensland's export income during the 1880s and 1890s. These enormous amounts of gold were purchased by banks such as the BNSW, which played a vital role in this process of wealth creation and distribution.

In 1881, the bank was burned down along with a number of other buildings in a large fire.

In February 1890 Brisbane architect Richard Gailey advertised for tenders to build a brick building for the Bank of New South Wales in Gympie. On 24 March the old bank building on the site was sold and building of the new premises commenced.

Business commenced in the new premises on 31 March 1891, completed at a cost of £4000. The two-storey building comprised rendered brick walls and an iron roof. At the rear was a two-stall stable with harness room. The second storey of the building comprised the manager's residence and an early photograph shows a verandah on the lower (eastern) side of the first floor.

The building's architect, Richard Gailey (1834–1924) was a Londonderry man who had settled in Brisbane in 1864. He established his own practice there in 1865, and over the next 60 years built up a thriving business; working until his death in 1924. He designed Baptist churches including the Baptist City Tabernacle in Brisbane, the former Baptist Church in Ipswich; commercial buildings such as banks including the Westpac Bank Building in Normanton; and many hotels including the Jubilee Hotel, Orient Hotel, Regatta Hotel and Wickham Hotel (all in Brisbane). Many commercial buildings in Brisbane designed by Gailey during the 1880s were characterised by classical idioms and details.

Substantial changes in the Queensland mining sector occurred after 1900. A treatment process for mine tailings that used cyanide had provided Gympie a record yield in 1899. Gold production in Queensland peaked in 1903, due largely to a final burst of production at Gympie, which was followed by a 60% decrease in production between 1903 and 1913 as the three major Queensland goldfields (Charters Towers, Gympie, and Mount Morgan) declined simultaneously. The Gympie field passed through its most profitable period from 1901 to 1906 and in 1903 recorded an output of 146,000 fine ounces (surpassing Mount Morgan that year). After 1906 the decline that had set in at Gympie in 1904 accelerated, finally resulting in the closure of the last mine c. 1927.

In conjunction with this downturn, Gympie evolved into a service town for the region's growing dairy and agricultural industries. Over time the commercial centre of the town moved eastward down Mary Street in response to the commercial activity clustered around the railway station. The BNSW continued to operate from its location in upper Mary Street until June 1940 when the Bank purchased a block of land closer to the commercial centre of the town at the corner of Mary and Smithfield Streets and new premises were erected. The BNSW building at 242 Mary Street was sold to the Widgee Shire Council in the same year.

Alterations to the former BNSW building were made on several occasions. In 1902 "steel" [metal] ceilings were fitted in the BNSW building by Messrs Crane and son. In 1938 the BNSW made alterations and additions to the bank premises and installed a septic system. After purchase by the Widgee Shire Council in 1940 the building was used as shire chambers and office space after some changes were made for this purpose by architects Addison and McDonald who called tenders in June 1940. In February 1981, extension and alterations to the south-east of the building to provide offices facing Mary Street took place.

In 1993, the Shire of Widgee was amalgamated with the City of Gympie to create the Shire of Cooloola. The building continued to be used as the Cooloola Shire Council Chambers. In 2008, the Shires of Cooloola and Kilkivan and part of the Shire of Tiaro were amalgamated into the Gympie Region. The building continues to be used as the Gympie Regional Council Chambers.

== Description ==
A compact but grand, three-storey, rendered brick building in a classical idiom, the former Bank of New South Wales stands prominently to upper Mary Street, Gympie.

Built on a sloping site with frontages to Mary and Reef streets, the three-bay main elevation to Mary Street is defined by the corner banded pilasters and articulated by two implied orders of pilasters, Corinthian to the upper level and Doric within a rusticated treatment to the ground level. Projecting cornices and continuous window sills to each level together with a balustraded parapet and a blind balustrade below the upper-level windows give horizontal unity. Projecting banded pilasters frame the central bay which accommodates a rusticated portal entrance below a serlian-inspired window. The upper-level outer bays accommodate pedimented full pane sash windows framed by plain projecting architraves with base ears. The street level accommodates two full pane sash windows to the south bay and a sash window and six-panel timber door with large fanlight to the north.

The Reef Street elevation consists of the west wing, each level of which is punctuated by a central full pane sash window, and the enclosed extension beyond the upper-level verandah. The northwest and southeast elevations are partly obscured by adjacent buildings. The northwest elevation of the west wing is notable for the decorative metal awning to the upper sash window. The southeast elevation is divided into four bays by plain pilasters, is crowned by a blind parapet concealing the hipped roof beyond, and is punctuated by full pane sash windows to each level. The entablature and cornice of the upper level of the front elevation continues around in the southeast elevation. A lower curved parapet screens the rear upper-level verandah roof and the elevation houses a narrow rectangular louvred window. There is evidence of the removal of French windows and replacement with the sash windows to the upper level of the southeast elevation. The earlier verandah has been replaced by a suspended awning.

The building is sheltered by hipped roofs clad with corrugated metal sheeting and three rendered masonry chimneys project through the roof.

Square in plan with a projecting west wing, the building is organised over three levels. The former banking chamber is accommodated at the Mary Street level, the bank vaults and storage are housed in the basement and the former bank manager's residence occupies the upper level.

The ground floor retains the major spaces of the former bank including the main banking chamber, manager's office, and strong room and accountant/clerks office, and the entrance to the residence above. The banking chamber is accessed from the central main entrance off Mary Street and is notable for its decorative pressed metal ceiling. The manager's office, opening off the chamber to the northwest, has a pressed metal ceiling, granite surround fireplace, and a substantial strong room to the southwest. The strong room, a painted brick rectangular space with a barrel-vaulted ceiling, has a heavy metal door with the maker's plate "Milners' 212 Patent Thief-Resisting". The strong room houses a small safe with the maker's plate "John Tann's Reliance Safe". The accountant/clerk's office, a large rectangular room to the southwest of the banking chamber is notable for its decorative plaster ceiling in an art deco style. The interior walls of the former banking floor spaces, except the strong room, are plaster finished and are distinguished by timber veneer wall panelling. The office in the west wing retains its fireplace cavity now housing a cupboard.

The basement, level with Reef Street, has a concrete floor and concrete and brick walls and accommodates a number of vaults and storage rooms below the banking floor. In some spaces the timber frame of the floor above is unlined. The rear office has a painted off-form concrete finish to the walls and fireplace and the ceiling is lined with fibre cement sheeting.

A handsome cedar staircase rises from the corridor extending from the northern entrance off Mary Street. The staircase has with finely turned balustrades and carved newel posts. The upper level is organised around a central corridor incorporating a hall at the top of the stairs with two rooms to the Mary Street side and two to Reef Street. French windows to the rooms on the Reef Street side open onto a verandah, now enclosed with weatherboard cladding and casement windows, running along the Reef Street side. All interior walls are plastered and this level is notable for decorative pressed metal ceilings to rooms, hall, corridor, and staircase soffits and the retention of much original cedar joinery including skirtings, architraves, doors, and windows. The front rooms have back to back fireplaces with marble surrounds. Decorative arches with prominent keystones at the top of the stairs and part way along the corridor define the hall. Accessed from the rear verandah, the single room west wing is lit by full pane sash windows on three sides and has a recent plain plaster ceiling.

A concrete parking area runs to the rear of the building accessed from Reef Street.

Recent partitioning and extensions to the southwest of the building at all levels and a new wing to the southeast are not considered to be of heritage significance.

== Heritage listing ==
The former Bank of New South Wales building was listed on the Queensland Heritage Register on 15 April 2011 having satisfied the following criteria.

The place is important in demonstrating the evolution or pattern of Queensland's history.

The former Bank of New South Wales building and the important gold-era precinct of which it is a part are physical evidence of the evolution of Gympie gold mining, a major contributor to the wealth of Queensland for approximately 60 years from 1867. As Gympie gold production continued and evolved from alluvial to shallow reef mining to deep reef mining from 1875, this change was reflected in the erection of more permanent and elaborate buildings in the town centre.

The bank building, erected during the third stage of Gympie mining, symbolised the wealth and permanence of the town. For almost fifty years the building served as a Bank of New South Wales branch and manager's residence.

Its siting near Commissioner's Hill in the vicinity of important government and gold-related buildings, and its later sale when the centre of the town moved eastwards after gold production ceased also illustrate the evolution of Gympie's development.

The place is important in demonstrating the principal characteristics of a particular class of cultural places.

The former bank building, designed by Richard Gailey, is important in demonstrating the principal characteristics of a regional bank of its era. This two-storey masonry structure in the classical style retains its banking chamber, offices, strong room, vaults, and manager's residence. It is sitting with other important gold-related buildings, high above the gold diggings, illustrates the significance of banks in the gold mining town of Gympie.

Its intactness is demonstrated in its planning, room volumes, joinery, strong room, and pressed metal ceilings. The former manager's residence, including its ground floor entry, retains its floor plan, decorative plaster cornices, windows, doors, and joinery.

The place is important because of its aesthetic significance.

The former bank building has aesthetic significance for its architectural qualities expressed in the craftsmanship and detailing of the joinery and finishes, and for its streetscape value through its form, scale and design. These qualities complement other surviving 19th-century buildings in the street, particularly other banks also entered in the Queensland Heritage Register including the nearby former Australian Joint Stock Bank (later the Gympie Stock Exchange).

Its balanced classical design, often associated with banks, projects the concept of stability that financial institutions of this era sought to convey through their buildings' architecture.
