= Shire of Widgee =

Local government area of Queensland, Australia

Coordinates: 26.197°S 152.888°E

The Shire of Widgee is a former local government area in the Wide Bay–Burnett area of Queensland, Australia. It was located in the rural areas around the town of Gympie but did not include the town itself, which was always in a separate local government area (Gympie Division, Borough of Gympie, Town of Gympie and City of Gympie). The administrative offices of the Shire of Widgee were located in Gympie.

== History ==
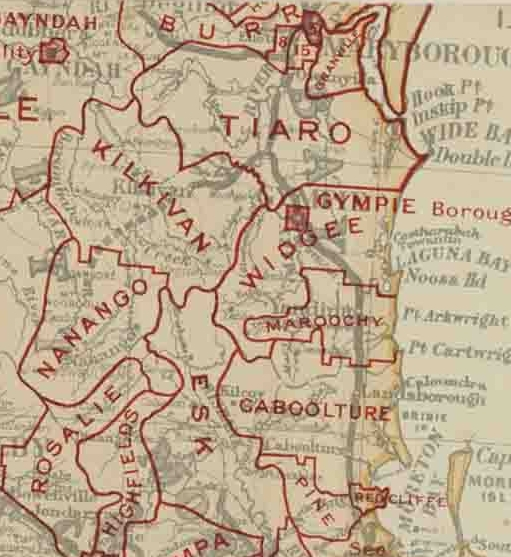
Map of Widgee Division and adjacent local government areas, March 1902

The Widgee Division was one of the original divisions incorporated on 11 November 1879 under the Divisional Boards Act 1879 with a population of 1609.

Kilkivan Division was created on 1 July 1886 from the western part of the Widgee Division and part of the Barambah Division under the Divisional Boards Act 1879. However, the changes to Widgee's boundaries were not welcomed by the Widgee Divisional Board; they felt so much territory had been removed from Widgee Division that it was effectively abolished and the board members all threatened to resign in protest. The government then hastily abolished Kilkivan Division on 30 July 1886, only four weeks after it was created, leading to protests by the residents of Kilkivan. Arguments about boundaries continued for a year. Kilkivan Division was eventually re-constituted on 17 November 1887, comprising part of No. 2 subdivision of Widgee Division and part of the No. 2 subdivision and all of the No. 3 subdivision of Barambah Division, to be governed by a board of six members.

On 4 January 1895, Glastonbury Division was abolished and split between the Widgee Division and the Borough of Gympie.

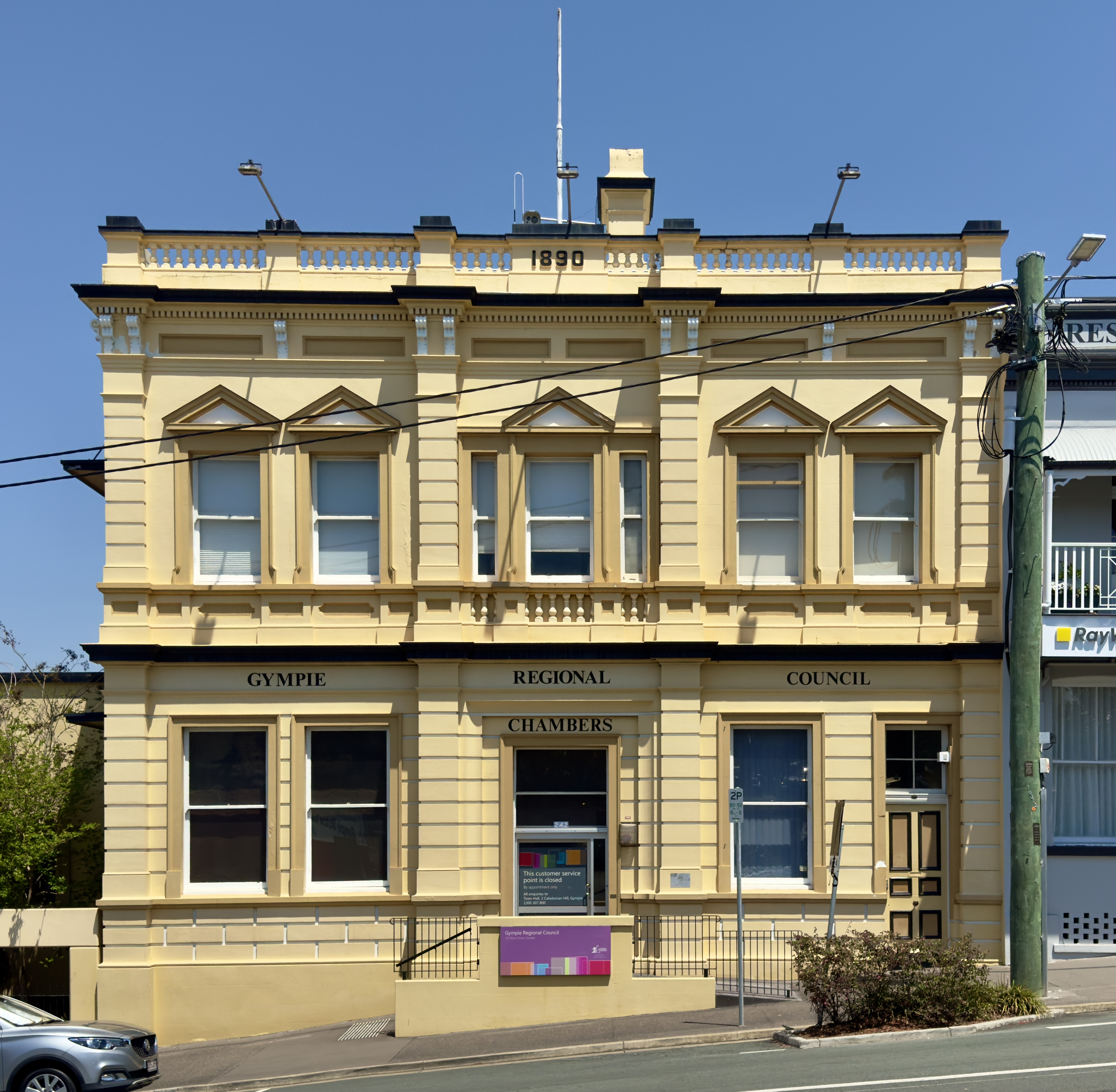
Widgee Shire Council Chambers, now Gympie Regional Council Chambers, 2025

With the passage of the Local Authorities Act 1902, Widgee Division became the Shire of Widgee on 31 March 1903, and on 21 November 1940 moved into new premises (the former Bank of New South Wales Building) at 242 Mary Street, Gympie.

On 19 March 1992, the Electoral and Administrative Review Commission, created two years earlier, produced its report External Boundaries of Local Authorities, and recommended that the City of Gympie and the Shire of Widgee should be amalgamated. The recommendation was implemented through the Local Government (Shire of Cooloola) Regulation 1993 creating the new Shire of Cooloola on 2 November 1993. The first elections were held on 27 November 1993 and Adrian McClintock, the former Widgee chairman, was elected for a four-year term. The Widgee Shire Council Chambers continued to be used as the Cooloola Shire Council Chambers.

On 15 March 2008, under the Local Government (Reform Implementation) Act 2007 passed by the Parliament of Queensland on 10 August 2007, the Shire of Cooloola merged with the Shire of Kilkivan and part of Shire of Tiaro to form the Gympie Region. The Cooloola Shire Council Chambers continued to be used as the Gympie Regional Council Chambers.

== Chairmen ==
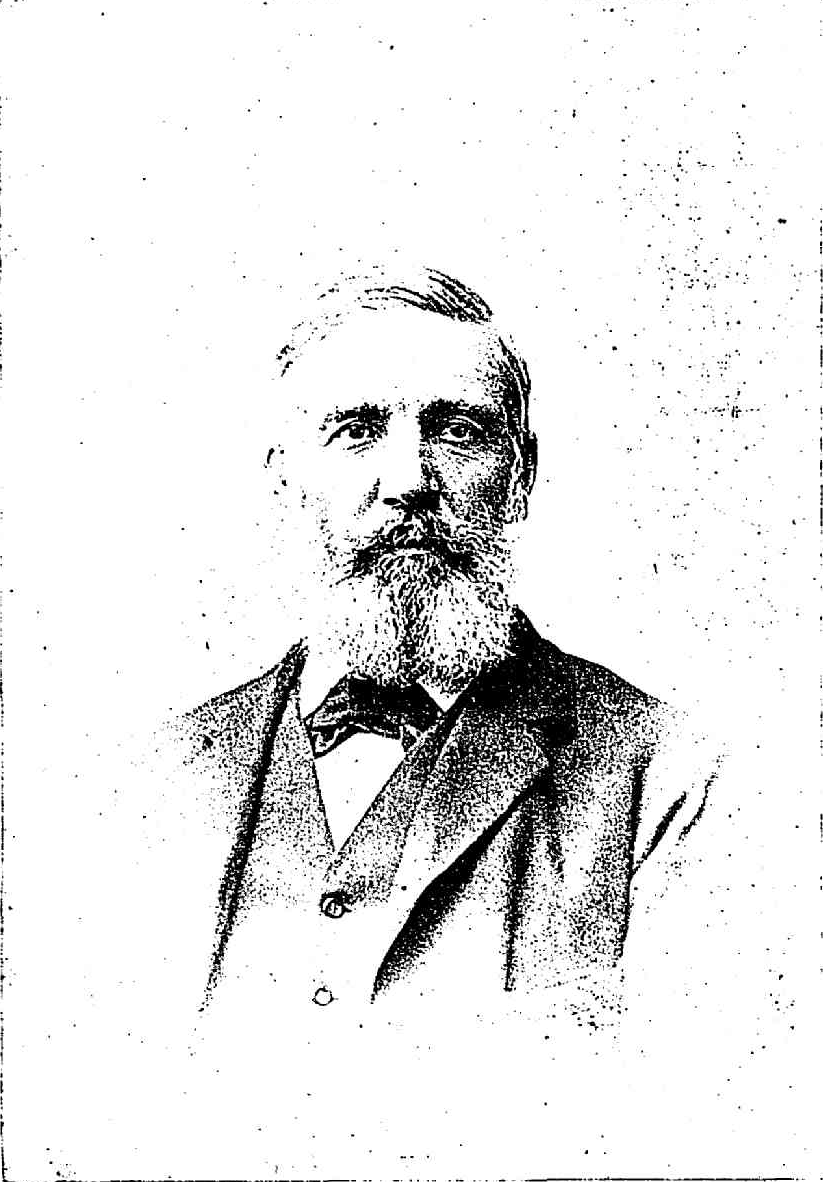
William Tatlock Chippindall, nine times chairman of the Widgee Divisional Board

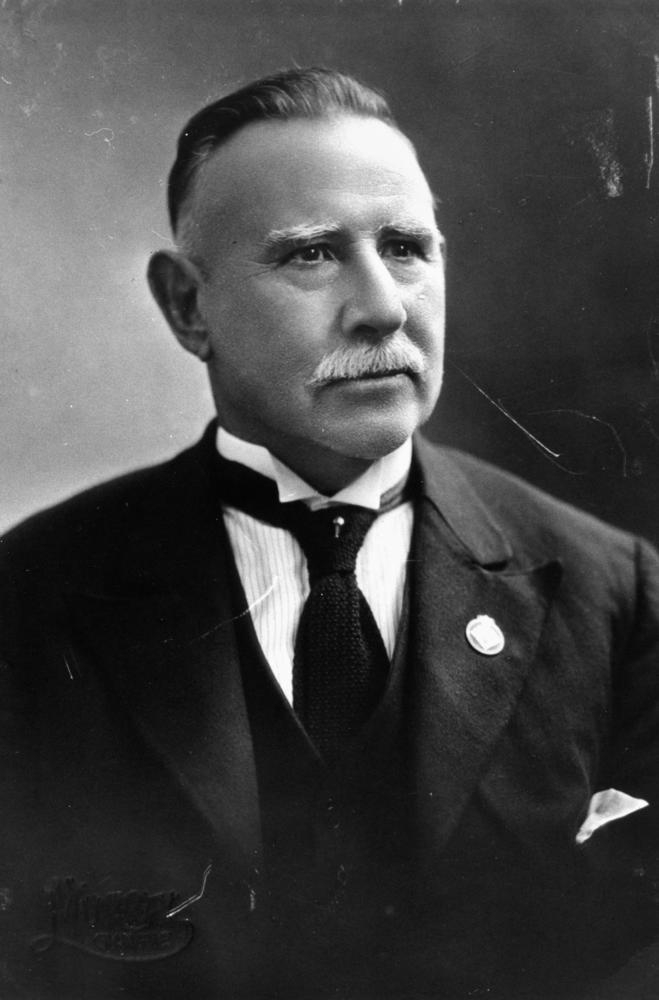
Thomas Edward Betts, chairman (1915) of Widgee Shire

The following were the chairmen of the Widgee Divisional Board and the Widgee Shire Council.

=== Chairmen of Widgee Divisional Board ===
- 1880–1884: Matthew Mellor, also mayor of Borough of Gympie, and Member of the Legislative Assembly for Wide Bay and Gympie
- 1884–1885: J Broadbent
- 1885–1886: W Ferguson
- 1886–1889: William Tatlock Chippindall
- 1889–1890: W Ferguson
- 1890–1891: William Tatlock Chippindall
- 1891–1892: J Flood
- 1892–1893: William Tatlock Chippindall
- 1898–1899: J Fraser
- 1899–1900: William Tatlock Chippindall
- 1900–1902: J Fullerton
- 1902–1903: W C Anderson
- 1903–1904: J Fraser

=== Chairmen of the Widgee Shire Council ===
- 1903–1904: J Fraser
- 1904–1907: W C Anderson
- 1907–1908: G Preston
- 1908–1911: J Fraser
- 1911–1912: Z D S Skyring
- 1912–1913: W M Tweed
- 1913–1914: T T Powell
- 1914–1915: T H Steele
- 1915–1916: Thomas Edward Betts
- 1916–1917: Z D S Skyring
- 1917–1918: J E Farrell
- 1918–1920: T H Steele
- 1920–1921: R B Parkyn
- 1921–1924: J T Tatnell
- 1924–1969: W H Kidd
- 1969–1873: W N Buchanan
- 1973–1876: M V MacDonnell
- 1976–1979: K De Vere
- 1979–1993: A McClintock
