= Gympie Stock Exchange =

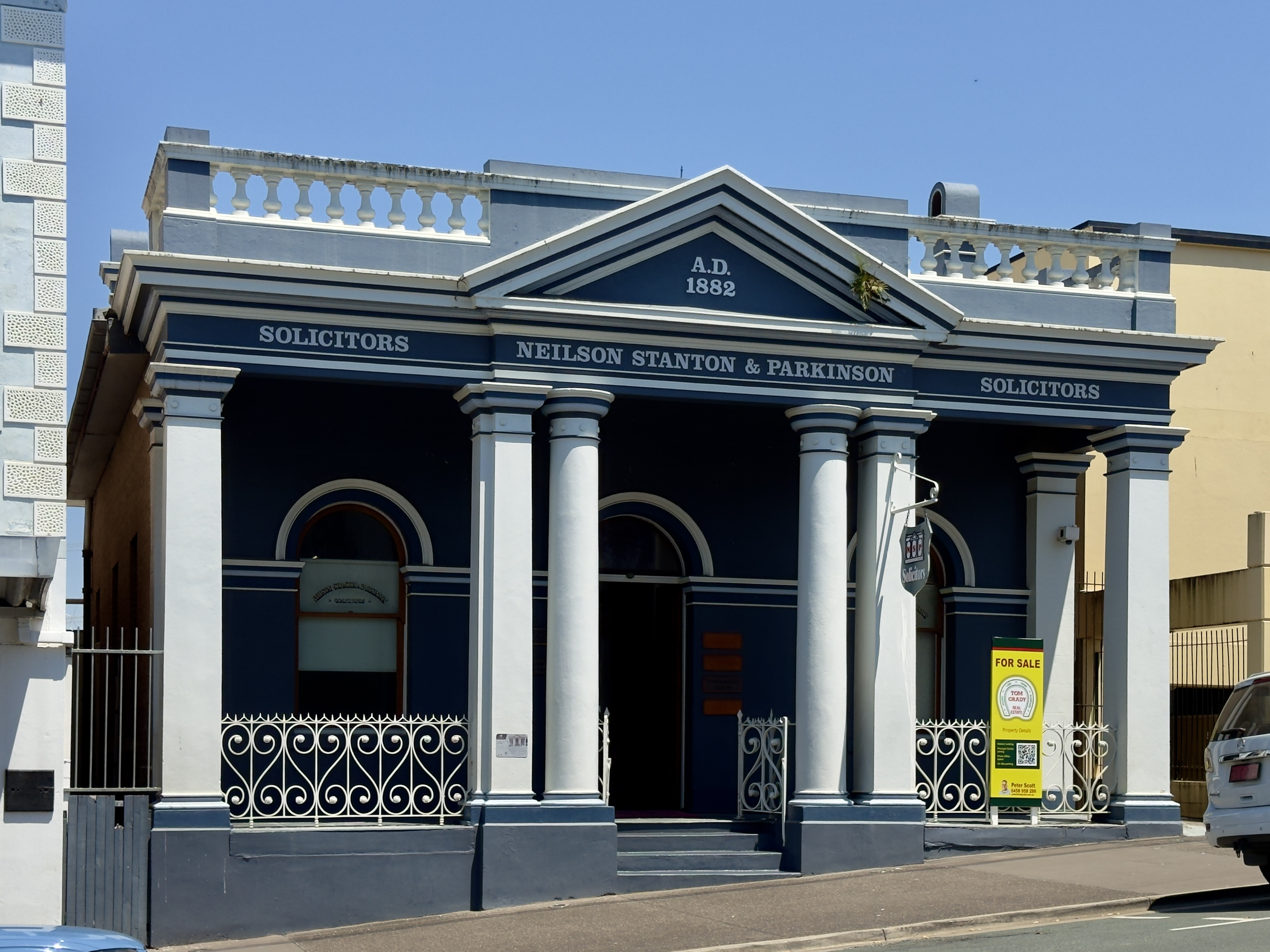
- The former Gympie Stock Exchange, 2025

- Location within Queensland Location within Australia
- 26.1889°S 152.6587°E
- Location: 236 Mary Street, Gympie, Gympie Region, Queensland, Australia

History
- Design period: 1870s–1890s (late 19th century)
- Built: 1881–1882

Site notes
- Architect: Francis Drummond Greville Stanley
- Architectural style: Classicism

Queensland Heritage Register
- Official name: Australian Joint Stock Bank (former)/Gympie Stock Exchange Offices and Club (former), Neilson, Stanton and Parkinson Building
- Type: state heritage (built)
- Designated: 15 April 2011
- Reference no.: 602772
- Significant period: 1882–1922
- Significant components: bank
- Builders: Andrew Collins

Gympie Stock Exchange is a heritage-listed former bank building and former stock exchange at 236 Mary Street, Gympie, Gympie Region, Queensland, Australia. It was designed by Francis Drummond Greville Stanley and built from 1881 to 1882. It is also the former Australian Joint Stock Bank and the Neilson, Stanton and Parkinson Building. It was added to the Queensland Heritage Register on 15 April 2011.

== History ==
The former Australian Joint Stock Bank (AJSB) and later Gympie Stock Exchange building is a single storey rendered brick building in the classical style, plus a basement. Located in upper Mary Street, Gympie, it was designed by leading Queensland colonial architect Francis Drummond Greville Stanley and built in 1881–1882 for the Australian Joint Stock Bank as its permanent Gympie branch. Between 1902 and circa 1922 it functioned as the Gympie Stock Exchange Offices and Club.

Gympie (initially known as Nashville) was established after the discovery of gold in the Mary River district in October 1867. The new goldfield turned Queensland into a significant gold producer, contributing much needed finances to the young colony. Thousands of people arrived at the Gympie goldfield in the months after the discovery and a fledgling settlement emerged. In a year the alluvial gold had been exhausted and shallow reef mining commenced.

As Gympie evolved from a hastily established mining settlement, the early makeshift structures of the 1860s gradually gave way to more permanent and substantial public and private buildings from the mid-1870s. With the change to deep reef mining from 1875, came the need for extensive capital investment through the formation of companies using foreign as well as local capital. During 1881, mines began yielding large amounts of gold, marking a new era of wealth and prosperity for Gympie as an intensive phase of underground reef mining began, facilitated by the injection of capital into mining companies for machinery and employees. The influx of money and the resultant yield of gold were reflected in the redevelopment of upper Mary Street during the 1880s and 1890s with substantial commercial buildings such as banks and company secretary and brokers' offices. Several fires – in 1877, 1881 and 1891 – razed the earlier timber buildings and accelerated this transformation. A fire in August 1881 destroyed all of the buildings between Patterson's brick store and the Bank of New South Wales (242 Mary Street), leading to construction of more permanent masonry buildings in western side of upper Mary Street. One new building was that of the Australian Joint Stock Bank constructed during 1881 and 1882.

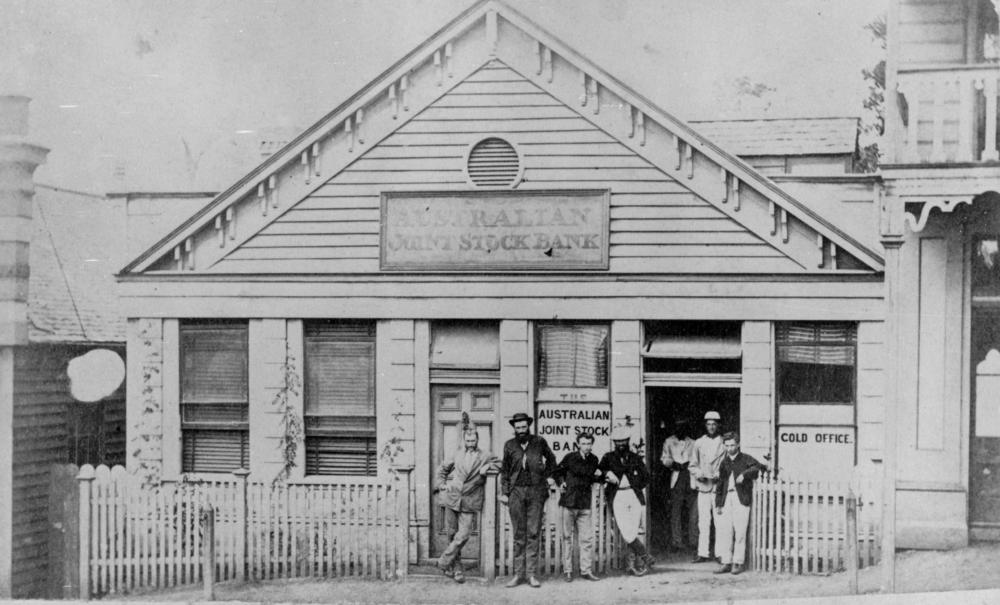
Australian Joint Stock Bank, Gympie, circa 1871

The Australian Joint Stock Bank was established with the discovery of gold in southern colonies in 1852 and opened branches on Queensland goldfields as they were discovered, including a branch at the Gympie goldfield on 10 March 1868. By 1878 the AJSB wished to establish a permanent branch in the town and purchased two adjacent town allotments (allotments 5 and 6, Section A) for this purpose in late October and early November 1878. The building designed for this site by architect FDG Stanley is in the neo-classical style befitting an organisation wishing to project stability, reliability and longevity. After seeing the plans, the building was described by the Gympie Times as "a very handsome brick building of two - or more correctly speaking - of one storey and a basement. The lower portion will be used as a record room, and the upper floor adapted for offices etc, the front being adorned with a handsome portico". Andrew Collins was contracted as the builder and the building cost approximately £1,400.

The bank's architect, FDG Stanley, arrived to Queensland in 1861 and was employed by the Lands and Works Department in the Queensland Colonial Architect's office from 1863 until 1881. The last eight years of his service were as Colonial Architect and as such he was the longest-serving of all Queensland's Colonial Architects. His principal building in this capacity was the Supreme Court Building in Brisbane (demolished). Thereafter Stanley worked in private practice until his death in 1897. His work was prolific and he produced many important buildings including the Queensland National Bank in Brisbane, the Holy Trinity Church and Rectory in Fortitude Valley, the Queensland Club in Brisbane and the Brisbane General Post Office. Among his regular clients were the Queensland National Bank, Australian Joint Stock Bank, the Union Bank of Australia, the Anglican Church and the merchants DL Brown and Co, for whom he designed substantial buildings throughout the colony. His buildings in Gympie include the former Gympie Post Office and St Patrick's Catholic Church. Stanley has been described as "the best known of all Queensland's early architects because of the quality, diversity and extent of his work".

Although bank architecture projected stability and reliability, these could not be provided in 1893 when Queensland suffered its worst banking collapse and eight of its eleven banks temporarily ceased trading, including the AJSB. It suspended trading from April to July when it reopened as a limited liability bank, namely, the Australian Joint Stock Bank Limited (AJSB Ltd). The property at 236 Mary Street was transferred to this institution and the bank continued to operate from this building in Mary Street until its closure on 17 January 1902.

Shortly thereafter the premises were sold to the Gympie Stock Exchange which retained the premises until 1923. From its inception on 10 July 1884, with 127 members and 60 companies listed, the Gympie Stock Exchange had occupied a building on the opposite side of upper Mary Street adjacent to the Mining Exchange Hotel (now the RSL Club). At its meeting on 25 February 1902 the Committee of the Gympie Stock Exchange resolved to offer £1,600 for the AJSB Ltd premises on the following terms: £400 cash, the balance in instalments of £150 pa with 5% added for interest. The purchasers were to have the right to pay larger instalments and the bank was to retain the deeds of the property until it was fully paid for. At its next meeting on 5 March 1902, the offer having been accepted, the chairman of the committee was empowered to complete the purchase of the AJSB Ltd premises. The committee met again on 12 March to consult with architect Hugo Durietz regarding alterations to the premises.

These additions and alterations were undertaken in May and June 1902. They included the Stock Exchange call room, a separate timber building, erected by Pointer and Stewart for £229 at the rear of the former bank and accessed by a laneway on the lower (left-hand-side) of the building. The Stock Exchange offices and its newly formed club were housed in the former bank building.

The formation of the Gympie Stock Exchange had resulted from the increase in the production of gold at Gympie through deep reef mining. During the 1880s and 1890s Gympie was Queensland's second and then third biggest gold producer (after Mt Morgan gold production overtook it in 1887). During this period gold production contributed between 21.61 and 35.53 percent of Queensland's export income. The increase in production led to an upsurge in company formation because the industry was also the major capital-using sector of the colonial economy and so adopted company formation on a massive scale. This growth in gold- mining shares led to the formation of the Gympie Stock Exchange for their trading. Other goldfield stock exchanges were established at Charters Towers and Ravenswood. The Gympie Stock Exchange specialised completely in mining. During its existence it competed with its Brisbane counterpart (also established in July 1884) - providing facilities for the transfer of shares of Gympie mining companies. The existence of the Stock Exchange in Gympie, in the heart of the goldfield, kept many shares away from Brisbane and, in addition, aided the development of company formation in Gympie. The volume of sales of Gympie shares on the Brisbane Stock Exchange rarely exceeded that on the Gympie Exchange.

Substantial changes in the Queensland mining sector occurred between 1899 and 1913. Gold production in Queensland peaked in 1903, due largely to a final burst of production at Gympie, which was followed by a 60% decrease in production between 1903 and 1913 as the three major Queensland goldfields (Charters Towers, Gympie and Mt Morgan) declined simultaneously. A treatment process for mine tailings that used cyanide had provided Gympie a record yield in 1899. The Gympie field passed through its most profitable period from 1901 to 1906 and in 1903 recorded an output of 146,000 fine ounces (surpassing Mount Morgan that year). After 1906 the decline that had set in at Gympie in 1904 began to accelerate.

This downturn in gold production forced the eventual closure of the Stock Exchange c. 1922. Despite this closure the Stock Exchange Club continued in this location at 236 Mary Street until 1923 when the premises were sold.

On 5 July 1923 Gympie solicitor Frederick Barker Sykes purchased the Gympie Stock Exchange site for £1,000. The Gympie Stock Exchange call room was removed c. 1923. It was divided into two sections. One of these was moved to Mothar Mountain where it became the home of Professor Edward Sykes (son of FB Sykes; Professor of Law at the University of Queensland and later at the University of Melbourne) and was later destroyed by fire. The other portion was relocated to the north-west of the Cooroy railway station goods' shed, where it remains. After the sale, the Gympie Stock Exchange Club moved to Smithfield Chambers on the opposite side of Mary Street, where the club remained until c. 1963 when its closure occurred due to a declining active membership.

The former bank and stock exchange building continued in the ownership of the Sykes family until 1976 when it was sold to Neilson, Stanton and Parkinson - another firm of solicitors. These owners report that only minor changes have been made to accommodate their firm's operations in the original building, although additions have been made to the rear of the building.

== Description ==
The former Gympie Stock Exchange, a single storey (with basement) masonry building with an elegant temple front, stands in upper Mary Street in Gympie's central business area. The early part of the building stands to the front of the site and a latter addition to the rear is not considered to be of cultural heritage significance. The building is built to the front property boundary.

The building is sheltered by a hipped roof clad with metal sheeting which is screened by a decorative balustraded parapet. A brick chimney with cornice banding rises through the roof on the western side of the building. The temple front comprises moulded square columns in an implied Doric order forming a timber floored entrance colonnade running across the front elevation. The columns support a plain entablature with a heavy moulded cornice. The projecting central entrance is flanked by twinned round and square columns supporting a plain entablature and crowned with a plain pediment. Decorative wrought iron balustrading runs between the square columns and a two-leaf decorative wrought iron gate marks the entrance. The front elevation is defined by square pilasters to the corners and is smooth-rendered masonry with a paint finish. The elevation is composed of three arched openings comprising a central entrance flanked by large double hung timber sash windows. A moulded cornice gives unity to the elevation.

The side elevations of the building are red facebrick and the building is separated from the adjacent buildings by narrow pedestrian lanes.

The central front entrance comprises a draft lobby consisting of a pair of exterior timber paneled doors with an arched fanlight and a pair of interior glazed timber doors on pivoting hinges. These swing doors are notable for the decorative brass, timber and glass handles. The flanking arched openings accommodate large double-hung timber sash windows.

The draft lobby opens into the banking chamber with the manager's office and the bank vault opening off this to the west. The rear section is organized off a central corridor with two rooms opening to the west and a single room to the east.

Internal openings are generous with wide timber paneled doors some with glazed pivoting fanlights. The south opening to the manager's office accommodates a glazed timber paneled door. Generous timber skirting boards, skirting blocks and architraves are throughout. Walls are lined with plaster and ceilings with fibrous cement sheeting with timber cornice and cover strips. Much early door and window hardware survives including brass door handles and plates, porcelain fingerplates, doorknobs, key plates, hinges and locks. Floors are generally lined with recent carpet but the early pine floor boards are intact below. The original rear doors are intact and consist of a pair of timber paneled doors to the east side and a single timber paneled door to the west. The foyer accommodates part of the ornate carved and paneled front counter. The thick vault door has a fine timber paneled door with original hardware including brass handle to the chamber face and is lined with a heavy brown metal plate to the inner face. The vault comprises an arch concrete roof supported by thick brick walls. The manager's office has an early fireplace with a decorated timber mantelpiece and cast iron grate and side cheeks.

The basement accommodates a storage vault where brick piers, brick foundation walls and the sandstone foundations of the vault above are visible. The timber-framed floor above is unlined. Facebrick arched brick lintels are above internal openings which accommodate pairs of timber paneled doors. Early metal bars are located on the inner face of the timber sash windows which have been sealed.

== Heritage listing ==
The former Australian Joint Stock Bank and former Gympie Stock Exchange offices and club was listed on the Queensland Heritage Register on 15 April 2011 having satisfied the following criteria.

The place is important in demonstrating the evolution or pattern of Queensland's history.

The former Australian Joint Stock Bank (AJSB) building (1882)-and the important gold-era precinct of which it is a part-is physical evidence of the evolution of Gympie gold mining, which was a major economic contributor to the wealth of Queensland for nearly 60 years from 1867. As Gympie gold production continued and evolved from alluvial to shallow reef mining to deep reef mining from 1875, this change was reflected in the erection of more permanent and elaborate buildings in the town centre. The former AJSB building was one of these permanent commercial buildings.

The former AJSB building is important in demonstrating the vital role of financial institutions in the process of wealth creation and distribution on Queensland goldfields when as a bank branch (1882–1902) it converted enormous amounts of gold into cash and later in its role as the Gympie Stock Exchange Offices and Club (1902-circa1922).

The place demonstrates rare, uncommon or endangered aspects of Queensland's cultural heritage.

As the premises of the Gympie Stock Exchange Offices and Club from 1902 to circa1922, the former AJSB building demonstrates a building type that has always been uncommon in Queensland and remains so. It is a rare surviving remnant of one of the four stock exchanges (in Brisbane, Gympie, Charters Towers and Ravenswood) that operated during the 19th century while Queensland was a significant gold-producer.

The place is important in demonstrating the principal characteristics of a particular class of cultural places.

The former AJSB building is important in demonstrating the principal characteristics of a regional bank of its era, being a good example of a masonry structure in the classical style combining a banking chamber and office. Its siting with other important gold-related buildings in upper Mary Street, high above the gold diggings, illustrates the prominence of banks in the gold mining town of Gympie.

Its intactness is demonstrated in its planning, room volumes, joinery, and strong room.

Designed by the respected and prolific architect, FDG Stanley in 1881–82, the former AJSB building is a good example of Stanley's regional bank architecture.

The place is important because of its aesthetic significance.

The former AJSB building has aesthetic significance for its architectural qualities, expressed in the craftsmanship and detailing of the joinery and finishes, and for its streetscape value through its form, scale and design. These qualities complement other surviving 19th century buildings in the street, particularly other banks also entered in the Queensland Heritage Register including the nearby former Bank of New South Wales. The important and substantially intact gold-era precinct, of which this building is a valuable part, comprises a harmonious streetscape of late Victorian commercial buildings dating from the 1880s and 1890s.

Its balanced classical design, often associated with banks, projects the concept of stability that financial institutions of this era sought to convey through their buildings' architecture.
