= City of Gympie =

Local government area in Queensland, Australia

Coordinates: 25.628°S 152.590°E

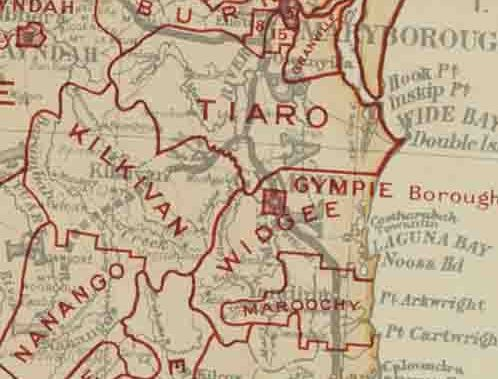
Map of Borough of Gympie and adjacent local government areas, March 1902

The City of Gympie is a former local government area in the south-east of Queensland, Australia, responsible for governing Gympie.

== History ==
On 11 November 1879, the Gympie Division was created as one of 74 divisions within Queensland under the Divisional Boards Act 1879 with a population of 4338.

However, the residents felt that Gympie warranted a municipality and petitioned the Queensland Government. On 25 June 1880, the division was abolished in favour of a municipality, the Borough of Gympie which held its first elections on 25 August 1880.

A town hall was built in 1890.

On 4 January 1895, Glastonbury Division was abolished and split between the Widgee Division and the Borough of Gympie.

On 31 March 1903 the Borough of Gympie became the Town of Gympie under the Local Authorities Act 1902 and on 7 January 1905 was proclaimed City of Gympie by the Governor of Queensland.

On 19 March 1992, the Electoral and Administrative Review Commission, created two years earlier, produced its report External Boundaries of Local Authorities, and recommended that the City of Gympie and the Shire of Widgee should be amalgamated. The recommendation was implemented through the Local Government (Shire of Cooloola) Regulation 1993 creating the new Shire of Cooloola on 2 November 1993. The first elections were held on 27 November 1993 and Adrian McClintock, the former Widgee chairman, was elected for a four-year term.

On 15 March 2008, under the Local Government (Reform Implementation) Act 2007 passed by the Parliament of Queensland on 10 August 2007, the Shire of Cooloola merged with the Shire of Kilkivan and Division 3 (Theebine/Gunalda areas) of Shire of Tiaro to form the Gympie Region.

== Chairmen and Mayors ==
The following are the chairmen of Gympie Division:

- 1880— : William Henry Couldery

The following are the mayors of Gympie Borough/Town/City:

- 1880–82: Matthew Mellor, also chairman of Widgee Divisional Board, and Member of the Legislative Assembly for Wide Bay and Gympie
- 1882–83: William Ferguson (S.M.)
- 1883–84: William Smyth
- 1884–86: William Ferguson (S.M)
- 1886–90: Lieut.-Col. William Ferguson
- 1890–91: Edward Bytheway
- 1891–92: John L Mathews
- 1892–93: Abraham Hutchinson
- 1893–94: John L Mathews
- 1894–95: William Suthers
- 1895–96: Edward Bytheway
- 1896–97: William Suthers
- 1897–98: Matthew Mellor
- 1898–99: Daniel Mulcahy
- 1899 – October 1899: George Ryland
- October 1899 – 1901: Daniel Mulcahy
- 1902: Edgar Benjamin Davidson
- 1902: Daniel C Dowling
- 1903–04: David Elder Reid
- 1904–05: Gilbert Garrick
- 1905–07: George F. Lister
- 1907–08: Walter G. Ambrose
- 1908–09: George A. Buist
- 1909–11: William E. Burbidge
- 1911–12: Richard H. Cox
- 1912–13: Walter G. Ambrose
- 1913–14: Alfred George Ramsey
- 1914–16: Peter Green
- 1916–17: Samuel D. Weller
- 1917–18: George H. Mackay
- 1918–19: R. Stitt
- 1919–20: W. H. Sedgman
- 1920–21: Luke J. Thomas (end of annual elections)
- 1921–24: Luke J. Thomas
- 1924–27: George Thomas
- 1927–30: Luke J. Thomas
- 1930–March 1931: Alexander Glasgow
- 1931–April 1937: Dr Luther Morris
- 1937–August 1941: Luke J. Thomas
- 1941–70: Ronald N Witham
- 1970–76: James E. Kidd
- 1976–88: Minas J. Venardos
- 1988–93 Joan E. Dodt
