= Members of the Queensland Legislative Council, 1917–1922 =

This is a list of members of the Queensland Legislative Council from 1 January 1917 to the Council's abolition on 23 March 1922. Appointments, made by the Governor of Queensland, were for life, although many members for one reason or another resigned.

== Background ==
The Legislative Council had become a "thorn in the side" of the Labor government, led by T. J. Ryan and in power since the 1915 election, having rejected or drastically amended over 800 bills between 1915 and 1918. Having failed at a referendum on 5 May 1917 to abolish the council, Labor opted for a new strategy – to stack the Legislative Council with Labor appointees who would then vote themselves out of existence.

In July 1917, the Governor, Sir Hamilton Goold-Adams, agreed reluctantly to Ryan's request to appoint 13 members to the Legislative Council. All of the new members had to sign a pledge supporting the abolition of the Council, and were sworn in on 10–12 October 1917. Another three were added to their number on 18 August 1919, and 14 on 19 February 1920 under new Premier Ted Theodore.

Following the death of Labor president of the Council William Hamilton on 27 July 1920, William Lennon, the Speaker of the Assembly was appointed a member and President. By this time, there were 57 members of the Council, 30 of whom were Labor members who had been appointed since the 1917 referendum, and four additional members were pre-existing Labor appointees.

Following a 51–15 vote in the Assembly in favour of the Constitution Act Amendment Bill 1921, Alfred Jones, the leader of the Government in the Council, commented on 26 October: "Today, we advocate the abolition of the Council because of its uselessness. [...] Until we had a majority here, it was obstructive, and now that we have a majority here it is useless". The bill passed by 28–10, and the Council met for the last time on 27 October 1921. The Council formally ceased to exist on 23 March 1922 after the Bill received royal assent on 3 March.

== Office bearers ==
President of the Legislative Council:

- William Hamilton (15 February 1917 – 27 July 1920)
- William Lennon (18 August 1920 – 23 March 1922)

Chairman of Committees:

- William Taylor (Labor) (30 September 1913 – 16 November 1920)
- Thomas Nevitt (Labor) (17 November 1920 – 23 March 1922)

== Members ==
Members shaded red were Labor Party members of the Council.

| Name | Date appointed | Date left | Reason for leaving |
|---|---|---|---|
| Randolph Bedford^{[1]} | 12 October 1917 | March 23, 1922 | |
| Thomas Beirne | 27 July 1905 | March 23, 1922 | |
| Frederic Brentnall | 17 April 1886 | March 23, 1922 | |
| Charles Campbell | 3 July 1914 | 18 March 1919 | Death |
| William Henry Campbell | 12 July 1906 | 17 June 1919 | Death |
| Robert Carroll | 19 February 1920 | March 23, 1922 | |
| Arthur Carter | 15 July 1901 | 6 November 1917 | Death |
| William Colborne | 19 February 1920 | March 23, 1922 | |
| Joe Collings | 19 February 1920 | March 23, 1922 | |
| Frederick Courtice | 12 October 1917 | March 23, 1922 | |
| James Cowlishaw | 18 April 1878 | March 23, 1922 | |
| Walter Russell Crampton | 10 October 1917 | March 23, 1922 | |
| George Curtis | 3 July 1914 | March 23, 1922 | |
| Alfred Davey | 12 July 1906 | March 23, 1922 | |
| William Demaine | 10 October 1917 | March 23, 1922 | |
| Jeremiah Donovan | 19 February 1920 | March 23, 1922 | |
| Timothy Donovan | 19 February 1920 | March 23, 1922 | |
| Andrew Dunn | 3 July 1914 | March 23, 1922 | |
| William Dunstan ^{[2]} | 19 February 1920 | March 23, 1922 | |
| Bartley Fahey | 5 May 1904 | 9 August 1920 | Death |
| William Finlayson | 19 February 1920 | March 23, 1922 | |
| Edwin Fowles | 1 July 1912 | March 23, 1922 | |
| Angus Gibson | 6 April 1899 | 28 May 1920 | Death |
| George Wilkie Gray | 23 August 1894 | March 23, 1922 | |
| Henry Littleton Groom | 12 July 1906 | March 23, 1922 | |
| Thomas Murray Hall | 12 July 1906 | March 23, 1922 | |
| William Hamilton | 10 July 1915 | 27 July 1920 | Death |
| Jack Hanlon | 19 February 1920 | March 23, 1922 | |
| Edward Joseph Hanson | 19 February 1920 | March 23, 1922 | |
| Arthur Hawthorn^{[1]} | 11 February 1911 | March 23, 1922 | |
| Albert Hinchcliffe | 4 May 1904 | March 23, 1922 | |
| Joseph Hodel | 3 July 1914 | March 23, 1922 | |
| Alfred Jones | 15 February 1917 | March 23, 1922 | |
| Hamilton Jones | 10 October 1917 | March 23, 1922 | |
| Thomas Llewellyn Jones | 18 August 1919 | March 23, 1922 | |
| Charles Kilpatrick | 19 February 1920 | March 23, 1922 | |
| James Lalor | 23 August 1888 | 11 August 1921 | Resignation |
| George Lawson | 18 August 1919 | March 23, 1922 | |
| Patrick Leahy | 1 July 1912 | March 23, 1922 | |
| William Lennon | 18 August 1920 | March 23, 1922 | |
| Henry Llewellyn | 10 October 1917 | March 23, 1922 | |
| Lewis McDonald | 10 October 1917 | March 23, 1922 | |
| Frank McDonnell | 3 July 1907 | March 23, 1922 | |
| Charles McGhie | 4 May 1904 | 21 January 1917 | Death |
| Herbert McPhail | 19 February 1920 | March 23, 1922 | |
| Charles Marks | 28 November 1888 | March 23, 1922 | |
| Edward David Miles | 5 July 1902 | March 23, 1922 | |
| Berkeley Basil Moreton | 15 July 1901 | March 23, 1922 | |
| Robert Mulvey | 19 February 1920 | March 23, 1922 | |
| Peter Murphy | 4 May 1904 | March 23, 1922 | |
| Thomas Nevitt | 12 October 1917 | March 23, 1922 | |
| Charles Nielson | 14 September 1907 | March 23, 1922 | |
| Timothy O'Shea | 3 July 1914 | March 23, 1922 | |
| Gerald Page-Hanify | 10 October 1917 | 11 February 1922 | Death |
| Arthur Parnell | 3 March 1908 | March 23, 1922 | |
| Isidore Perel | 10 October 1917 | March 23, 1922 | |
| Edmund Plant | 8 June 1905 | March 23, 1922 | |
| Ernest Purnell | 12 October 1917 | March 23, 1922 | |
| Jim Riordan | 10 October 1917 | March 23, 1922 | |
| Alexander Skirving | 18 August 1919 | March 23, 1922 | |
| John Gordon Smith | 19 February 1920 | 19 June 1921 | Death |
| William Stephens | 1 July 1912 | March 23, 1922 | |
| Ernest James Stevens | 6 April 1899 | 7 September 1920 | Retired |
| Richard Sumner | 10 October 1917 | March 23, 1922 | |
| William Taylor | 17 April 1886 | March 23, 1922 | |
| George Thompson | 19 February 1920 | March 23, 1922 | |
| Andrew Joseph Thynne | 26 January 1882 | March 23, 1922 | |
| Henry Turner | 3 July 1907 | March 23, 1922 | |
| Arthur Whittingham | 1 July 1912 | March 23, 1922 | |

^{1} Randolph Bedford resigned on 21 February 1918 and was reappointed on 27 May 1918.
^{2} William Dunstan resigned on 15 June 1921 and was reappointed on 15 August 1921.
