= Members of the Queensland Legislative Council, 1910–1916 =

This is a list of members of the Queensland Legislative Council from 1 January 1910 to 31 December 1916. Appointments, made by the Governor of Queensland, were for life, although many members for one reason or another resigned.

The Labor Party had a major win in the Legislative Assembly at the 1915 election, and proceeded with their stated goal of abolishing the Legislative Council by introducing legislation to that effect in 1916, which of course was defeated by the non-Labor majority Council. By the end of 1916, the membership had fallen from 44 to 37 members as the government had only appointed one new member in two years.

== Office bearers ==
President of the Legislative Council:

- Arthur Morgan (19 January 1906 – 19 December 1916)

Chairman of Committees:

- Peter MacPherson (6 August 1907 – 12 September 1913)
- William Taylor (30 September 1913 – 16 November 1920)

== Members ==
Members shaded red were Labor Party members of the Council.

Name	Date appointed	Date left	Reason for leaving
John Annear	5 July 1902	28 May 1910	Death
Andrew Henry Barlow	10 June 1896	29 March 1915	Death
Thomas Beirne	27 July 1905	March 23, 1922	
Frederic Brentnall	17 April 1886	March 23, 1922	
William Villiers Brown	15 July 1901	29 April 1915	Death
Albert Callan	5 July 1902	9 May 1912	Death
Charles Campbell	3 July 1914	March 18, 1919	
William Henry Campbell	12 July 1906	June 17, 1919	
Arthur John Carter	15 July 1901	November 6, 1917	
Felix Clewitt	30 July 1890	13 February 1913	Death
Robert Collins	14 June 1913	8 August 1913	Death
James Cowlishaw	18 April 1878	March 15, 1922	
Thomas Bridson Cribb^{[2]}	14 June 1913	4 September 1913	Death
George Curtis	3 July 1914	March 23, 1922	
Alfred Davey	12 July 1906	March 23, 1922	
John Deane	31 July 1889	27 October 1913	Death
Andrew Dunn	3 July 1914	March 23, 1922	
Bartley Fahey	5 May 1904	August 9, 1920	
Edward Barrow Forrest^{[2]}	14 June 1913	30 March 1914	Death
Edwin Fowles	1 July 1912	March 23, 1922	
Angus Gibson	6 April 1899	May 28, 1920	
George Wilkie Gray	23 August 1894	March 22, 1922	
Henry Littleton Groom	12 July 1906	March 23, 1922	
Thomas Murray Hall	12 July 1906	March 23, 1922	
William Hamilton	10 July 1915	July 27, 1920	
Frederick Hart	11 July 1872	15 July 1915	Death
Arthur Hawthorn^{[1]}	11 February 1911	March 23, 1922	
Albert Hinchcliffe	4 May 1904	March 23, 1922	
Eugen Hirschfeld	3 July 1914	2 November 1914	Resignation
Joseph Hodel	3 July 1914	March 23, 1922	
Magnus Jensen	4 May 1904	16 May 1915	Death
Thomas Alexander Johnson	4 May 1904	28 October 1914	Death
James Lalor	23 August 1888	August 11, 1921	
Patrick Leahy	1 July 1912	March 23, 1922	
Frank McDonnell	3 July 1907	March 23, 1922	
Charles McGhie	4 May 1904	January 21, 1917	
Peter MacPherson	1 July 1881	12 September 1913	Death
Charles Marks	28 November 1888	March 23, 1922	
Edward David Miles	5 July 1902	March 23, 1922	
Berkeley Basil Moreton	15 July 1901	March 23, 1922	
Arthur Morgan	19 January 1906	20 December 1916	Death
Peter Murphy	4 May 1904	March 23, 1922	
Charles Nielson	14 September 1907	March 23, 1922	
Albert Norton	23 August 1894	11 March 1914	Death
Timothy O'Shea	3 July 1914	March 23, 1922	
Thomas O'Sullivan	18 February 1908	9 December 1915	Resignation
Arthur Parnell	3 March 1908	March 23, 1922	
Edmund Plant	8 June 1905	March 23, 1922	
Francis Isidore Power	15 July 1901	24 June 1912	Death
Alexander Raff	14 August 1884	10 June 1910	Resignation
Robert Harrison Smith	4 May 1904	11 November 1911	Death
Joseph Smyth	5 May 1882	16 July 1910	Resignation
William Stephens	1 July 1912	March 23, 1922	
Alfred John Stephenson	3 July 1914	4 December 1914	Death
Ernest James Stevens	6 April 1899	September 7, 1920	
William Taylor	17 April 1886	March 23, 1922	
Lewis Thomas	5 July 1902	16 February 1913	Death
Andrew Joseph Thynne	26 January 1882	March 23, 1922	
Henry Turner	3 July 1907	March 23, 1922	
Arthur Whittingham	1 July 1912	March 23, 1922	

^{1} Arthur Hawthorn resigned on 22 March 1912, and was reappointed on 1 July 1912.
^{2} Thomas Cribb and Edward Barrow Forrest had served previous terms on the Council.
