= Arthur Carter =

Arthur Carter may refer to:

- Arthur L. Carter (1931–2025), American investment banker, publisher, and artist
- Arthur Carter (politician) (1847–1917), businessman and Queensland politician
- Arthur Carter (cricketer) (1848–1923), English cricketer and clergyman
