= Timothy O'Shea (disambiguation) =

Timothy O'Shea is an academic.

Timothy O'Shea may also refer to:

- Timothy Joseph O'Shea (1860–1930), Queensland politician
- Tim O'Shea (footballer) (born 1966), football player and manager
- Tim O'Shea (born 1962), American basketball coach
- Timothy O'Shea (business executive) (1935–1988), American executive, government official, and educational activist
- Tim O'Shea (rugby), South African rugby footballer
