= George Thomson =

George Thomson may refer to:

== Government and politics ==
- George Thomson (MP for Southwark) (c. 1607–1691), English merchant and Parliamentarian soldier, official and politician
- George Thomson, Baron Thomson of Monifieth (1921–2008), Scottish politician; former Labour MP and peer
- George Thomson (Canadian politician) (1855–1920), Scottish-born merchant, official and political figure in British Columbia
- George Walker Thomson (1883–1949), Scottish trade unionist
- George Thomson, Lord Thomson (1893–1962), Scottish politician and judge

== Sports ==
- George Thomson (footballer, born 1854) (1854–1937), Wales international footballer
- George Thomson (rugby union, born 1856) (1856–1899), English rugby union footballer who played in the 1870s and 1880s
- George Thomson (rugby union, died 2005), Scottish rugby union player
- George C. Thomson (1888–1976), American football player, lawyer and banker
- George Thomson (footballer, born 1936) (1936–2007), Scottish footballer (Hearts, Everton, Brentford)
- George Thomson (footballer, fl. 1932–1946), Scottish footballer (Aberdeen)
- George Thomson (footballer, born 1992), English footballer

== Military ==
- George Pirie Thomson (1887–1965), British naval officer and press censor
- George Thomson (RAF officer) (1896–1918), Canadian World War I flying ace
- George Edwin Thomson (1897–1918), British World War I flying ace

== Other ==
- George Thomson (physician) (c. 1619–1676), English physician, medical writer and pamphleteer
- George Thomson (musician) (1757–1851), Scottish musician; collector of the music of Scotland
- George Thomson (shipbuilder) (1815–1866), Scottish engineer and shipbuilder
- George Thomson (botanist) (1819–1878), Scottish missionary and plant collector
- George Thomson (naturalist) (1848–1933), New Zealand scientist, educationalist, social worker and politician
- George Paget Thomson (1892–1975), English physicist and Nobel laureate
- George Derwent Thomson (1903–1987), English Marxist philosopher; Greek and Irish scholar
- George Malcolm Thomson (journalist) (1899–1996), Scottish journalist, author and nationalist
- George Thomson (rose breeder), Scottish-born Australian rose breeder
- George Sutherland Thomson (1871–1958) dairy expert
- George Ritchie Thomson (1865–1946), Scottish military surgeon and expert on tropical medicine

== See also ==
- George Thompson (disambiguation)
