= William F. Taylor =

William F. Taylor may refer to:

- W. F. Taylor (1877–1945), Canadian ice hockey administrator
- William Frederick Taylor (1840–1927), medical doctor and member of the Queensland Legislative Council
- William F. Taylor (artist), American artist
- William F. Taylor (colonel), American colonel in the Confederate States of America
- William F. Taylor (politician), American politician
