= Attorney General Power =

Attorney General Power may refer to:

- Bill Power (Australian politician) (1893–1974), Attorney-General of Queensland
- Francis Isidore Power (1852–1912), Attorney-General of Queensland
- Frederick A. Powers (1855–1923), Attorney General of Maine

== See also ==
- General Power (disambiguation)
