= Charters Towers School of Mines =

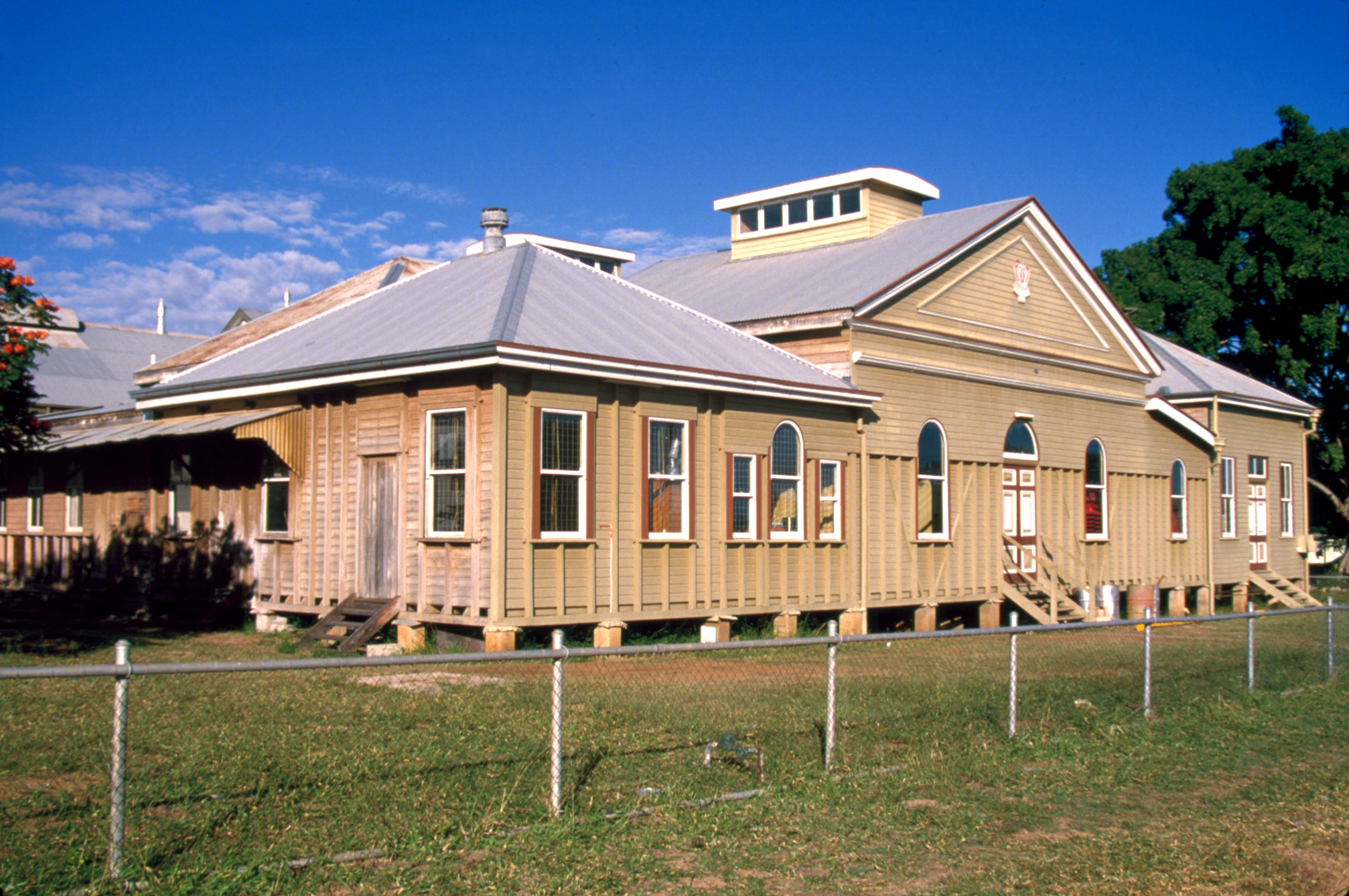
- School of Mines, 1985

- Location within Queensland Location within Australia
- 20.0783°S 146.2604°E
- Location: 24–26 Hodgkinson Street, Charters Towers City, Charters Towers, Charters Towers Region, Queensland, Australia

Queensland Heritage Register
- Official name: School of Mines, Charters Towers
- Type: state heritage (built)
- Designated: 21 October 1992
- Reference no.: 600402
- Significant period: 1899–1907 (fabric); 1899–1925 (historical)

Charters Towers School of Mines is a heritage-listed school of mines at 24–26 Hodgkinson Street, Charters Towers City, Charters Towers, Charters Towers Region, Queensland, Australia. It was added to the Queensland Heritage Register on 21 October 1992.

== History ==
The School of Mines was established in 1899 by the local Mining Institute, through public subscription, on one of the most important mineral fields in Australia. A timber structure on a government reserve, it was taken over and expanded by the Queensland Government in 1900 into a highly regarded technical institution.

Charters Towers was established as a gold field in 1872. The gold was not alluvial, but in the form of downward sloping reefs of gold bearing ore. As time went on it became necessary to dig deeper and deeper shafts to extract the gold which required the formation of companies to provide sufficient capital. The mid 1880s saw a major boom in speculation on mining shares following the display of Charters Towers gold at the Colonial and Indian Exhibition in London and the finding of the Brilliant Reef in 1889. By drawing people and capital into North Queensland and by developing into an important centre, Charters Towers was to play an important role in the opening up of north Queensland as a whole. It was, at its peak, the second town in Queensland.

Possibly because of the richness of the ore at Charters Towers, some of the mines were run without much regard for the most efficient and modern methods. As geologist J. Malcolm McLaren noted in his Queensland Mining and Milling Practice in 1901, many had been established before metallurgy became an exact science. Towards the end of the century, there was considerable interest in improving methods in what had become a very important industry in Queensland.

Agitation for technical education in mining methods in Charters Towers began in the 1880s. A Government Mineralogical Officer, A.W. Clarke, was appointed in 1887, and in the following year a School of Mines Committee was set up to meet the government's offer of a pound for pound subsidy to establish a school. They were unable to collect sufficient funds and the scheme was temporarily abandoned with Clarke being recalled in 1892.

In 1896 a Mine and Mill Manager's Association was formed. Meetings were held monthly at the old Town Hall where papers on subjects connected with mining were presented and discussed. It soon became apparent that few members of the association, most of whom had practical rather than theoretical knowledge, could understand the more technical papers. This gave impetus to a renewed interest in establishing a technical school to teach subjects related to mining along the lines of the noted School of Mines in Ballarat and Otago.

It was decided to erect a building to be used as a Mining Institute, and a public subscription was taken up to finance the project, raising £1,500 for the building and equipment. A foundation stone was laid by Edward David Miles on Friday 3 March 1899 and was used as one of the stumps supporting the timber building. The school opened in the same year, teaching mathematics, surveying, assaying, chemistry and mineralogy and was governed by the Council of the Institute. Although there was an enrolment of between sixty and seventy students, attendance fell away as the year progressed and by the end of the year only two students remained. Although the experiment had failed, the need for technical instruction remained and the Institute approached the government who agreed to take over the school. The £1,500 pounds expended was refunded and used to refurbish the Institute's headquarters in Bow Street.

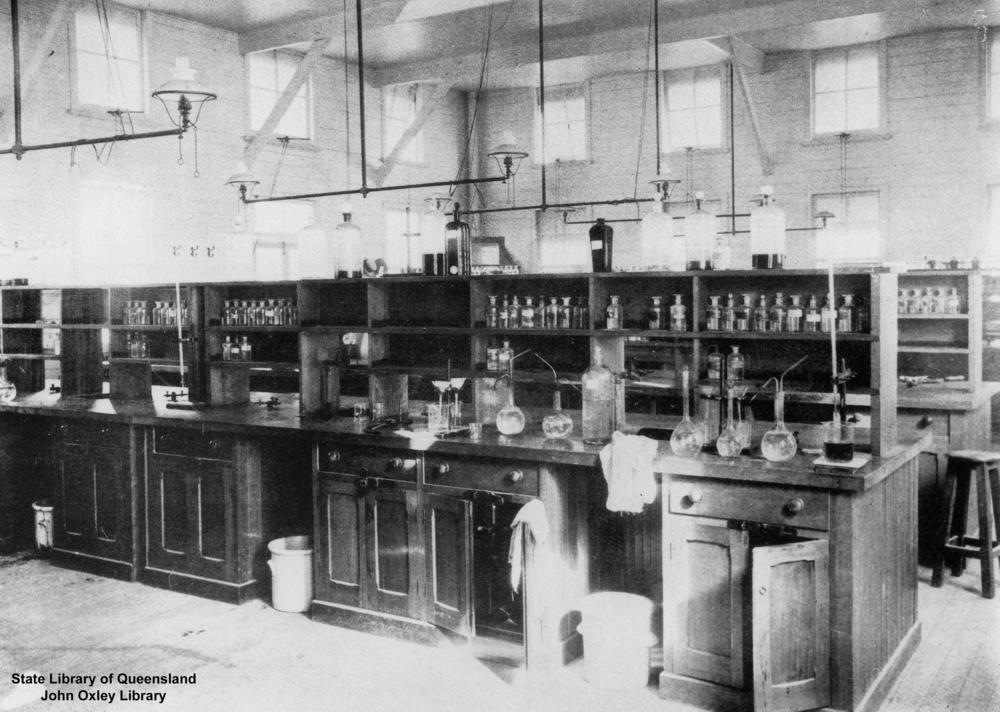
Laboratory in the School of Mines, 1908

A director for the School of Mines was appointed in October 1900 and immediately travelled to Charters Towers to inspect the Mining Institute buildings and to assess what alterations were needed. He made sketch plans used by the Queensland Government Architect to design additions and alterations which cost £700 and were carried out by local builder, B.Toll. The Director also appointed staff and purchased the necessary equipment to create an up-to-date technical school. Classes began in 1901, although work on the building was not quite complete. The school had lecture rooms for geology and chemistry, assaying and chemistry laboratories, a balance room, mechanical drawing and survey department, an office, two private rooms for lecturers, a storeroom and outbuildings. The first director was W.A. McLeod, a graduate of the New Zealand University and the Otago School of Mines. He was responsible only to the Minister and was given considerable freedom to formulate policy. A firm believer in giving working men an opportunity to advance in their industry, he had lectures repeated in the evening which allowed working miners to attend the School. At the time, this was considered a "novel" scheme and is believed to have been unique in Australia.

Response to the new school was good and in 1903 the building was extended eastwards to include a reading room and office. The new section incorporated rectilinear sash windows instead of the round-headed sash windows of the original building and a new hip roof form.

In 1904, McLeod, having set the curriculum, left to become manager of the Brilliant Extended Mine. W.Poole was the second director and made the school into a highly regarded educational institution. His success is demonstrated in the substantial new additions made to the western section of the school in January 1907. These included a drawing office, lecture preparation room and new laboratory. The existing assay laboratory was also extended with balance rooms.

Although the School of Mines was flourishing, the Charters Towers field was in decline, having reached its peak in 1899. By 1912 many people were leaving the town and in 1916 the field closed. The school continued to produce a small, but highly regarded, stream of graduates who were to distinguish themselves in many branches of the mining industry, both in Queensland and further afield.

The School of Mines eventually closed in 1925 after it was taken over by the Department of Education. By this time the building had more than doubled its original size and formed a complex around a courtyard. In 1964, the connection between the front half of the building and the rear were severed.

In 1977 the Queensland Public Works Department planned to remove the main portion of the building retaining only the rear portion as a manual training section for the High School. After strong reaction by the residents of Charters Towers, the department leased the building to the National Trust of Queensland which undertook works to permit occupancy. It is currently sub-leased to the Department of Environment and Skillshare.

== Description ==
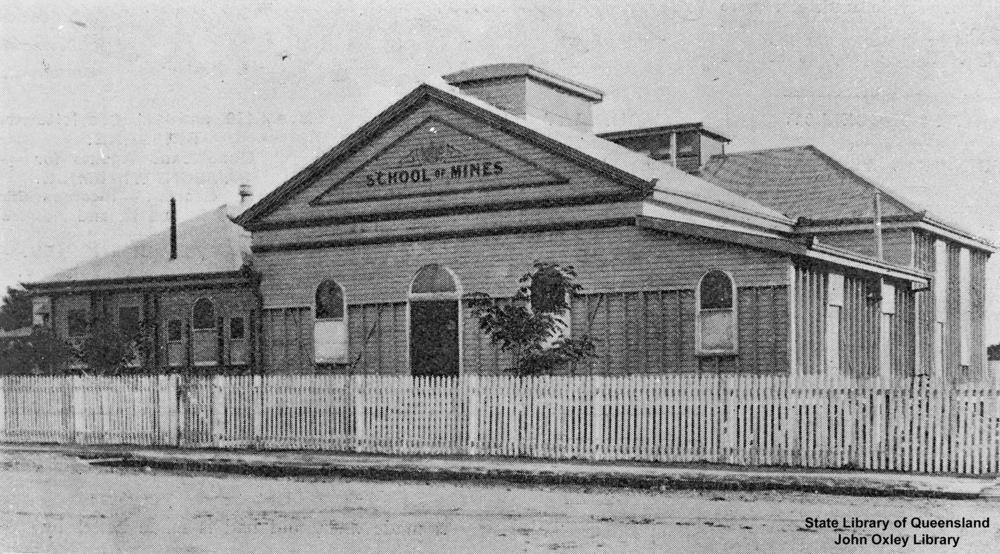
School of Mines, 1905

The School of Mines stands next to the Court House on a government reserve. It is a single story building, timber framed and clad on concrete stumps with a corrugated iron roof. One of the stumps at the front of the building is the foundation stone laid by E.D. Miles. Its current position helps to demonstrate that the building has been considerably extended during its life. Much of the School of Mines is of single skin construction. The front portion is approximately 30 by 20 metres (98 ft × 66 ft) with two small projections remaining from the wings, one of which contains toilets and a tea room. The rear block is 30 by 10 metres (98 ft × 33 ft) with part of one wing still attached. Most rooms in both blocks have high ceilings and good natural light from windows and roof lights. They are plainly but robustly detailed. Unsympathetic metal security grilles and an obtrusive air-conditioning system have been added.

Although many of the partitions have been moved around during the life of the building, it is fairly intact and incorporates much of the original linings and joinery. The floors are timber except for the concrete floor in the former furnace room.

The former school is now used by Towers Arts, the city's largest artists' community, for making and displaying paintings, pastels, photos, quilling, ceramics, jewellery, clothing, quilts, dolls and other artworks. Its rooms house Charters Towers' most extensive art galleries.

== Heritage listing ==
The School of Mines at Charters Towers was listed on the Queensland Heritage Register on 21 October 1992 having satisfied the following criteria.

The place is important in demonstrating the evolution or pattern of Queensland's history.

The School of Mines is located on what was one of Australia's most productive gold fields and reflects the importance of the mining industry to the development of north Queensland. It demonstrates the role of the Government in mining education at the turn of the century by its location on a government reserve and its adaptation by the Department of Works. Its success in the early years of the twentieth century is shown by the series of extensions to the building and its facilities.

The place is important because of its aesthetic significance.

It has aesthetic qualities which are well regarded by the community and which make a contribution to the streetscape.

The place has a special association with the life or work of a particular person, group or organisation of importance in Queensland's history.

It has special association with the ideas of W.A. McLeod, the first Director and with the many important figures in mining who were graduates of this school.
