= Beerburrum Soldier Settlement =

Failed settlement for war veterans

Coordinates: 26.9597°S 152.9573°E

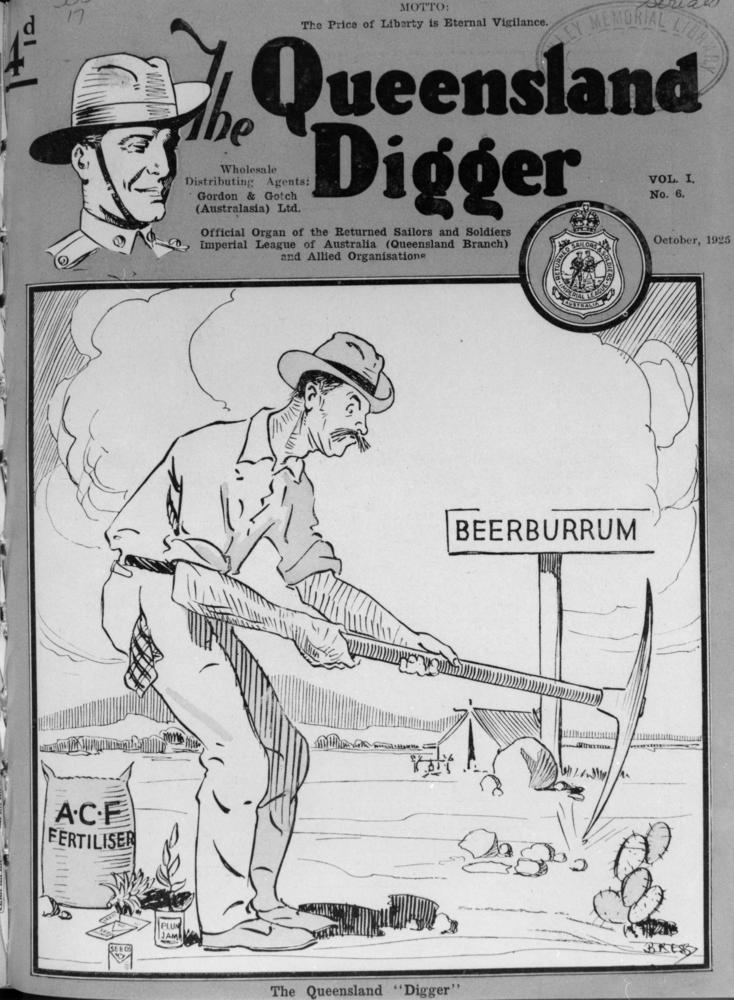
Illustration of a farmer working in the field at Beerburrum, 1925

Beerburrum Soldier Settlement was a soldier settlement in Beerburrum, Queensland, Australia, established to provide opportunities for Australian soldiers returning from World War I. It is generally regarded as a failure.

== History ==
As early as 1915 the Queensland Government was looking for vacant land suitable for settlement by returned soldiers. The Department of Lands stated that Queensland's vast areas of crown land and varying climates provided more opportunities than any other state of Australia for the settling of returned soldiers, both Australian and British. It was envisaged that the land would be suitable for lighter farming activities such as fruit and vegetable growing, poultry-raising and bee-keeping.

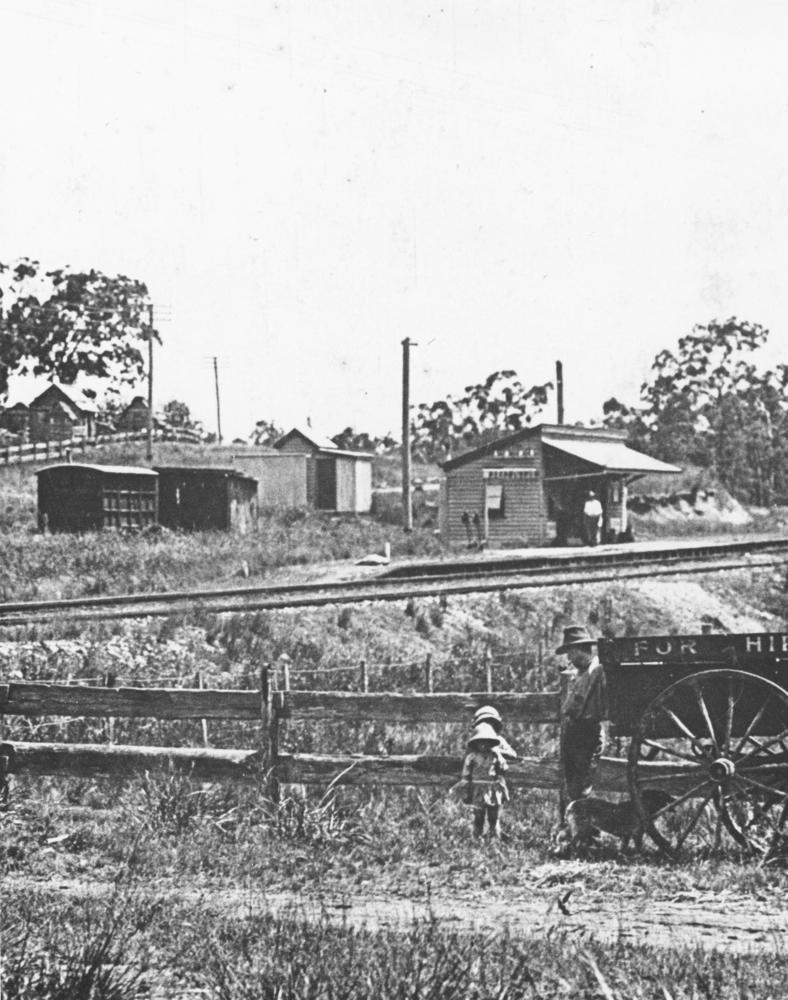
Looking towards the railway station, Beerburrum, 1916

The first land chosen for soldier settlement in Queensland was 53,000 acres (21,448.34 hectares) near the Beerburrum railway siding on the North Coast railway line. This mostly dry sclerophyll forest and wallum heathland had been leased to the Australian Government in 1910 as a military reserve for 30 years at a peppercorn rent. From 1913 the Australian government paid an annual rent of £1 subject to the right of resumption by the State of Queensland if required for State purposes. In 1916 the area was returned to the Queensland Government for soldier settlement. The area eventually opened for this purpose stretched from Beerburrum to Glass House Mountains in the north, southwards to Elimbah and eastwards to Pumicestone Passage. Beerburrum Soldier Settlement was first and largest of the approximately two dozen soldier settlements established in Queensland. Over the course of the scheme (1916–1929) approximately 2,500 returned soldiers were settled on the land in Queensland, including at least 400 at Beerburrum.

Work began immediately on analysis and surveying of the land. Beerburrum was chosen as the centre of the soldier settlement because of satisfactory soil tests, water availability and the existing railway siding. Surveyor Muntz was given the task of dividing this large area into portions of suitable land varying in size from approximately 20 to 40 acres. To ensure that each settler received a fertile selection, the surveyor was to mark his boundaries so that each portion would be equally productive. By November 1916, 11,600 acres had been surveyed into 310 portions. Joseph Rose, an experienced pineapple farmer, was placed in charge of the settlement. An experimental State training farm (portions 859, 860, 861, 862) was cleared and planted with pineapples for training returned soldiers in the growing of tropical crops.

Under the provisions of Queensland's 1917 Discharged Soldiers' Settlement Act after having received a qualification certificate from the Land Settlement Committee of the War Council, or from a Land Commissioner, applicants balloted for available selections and, if successful, were expected to pay one year's rent. This could either be paid in full at the time of occupation, or by ten equal instalments after taking up residence, in which case interest was added at the rate of four percent per annum. They were also expected to remain on the selection for a minimum period of five years, exceptions only being made in extreme cases of "illness, accident, or misfortune". From five to ten years the lease could only be transferred to another returned serviceman. After ten years the soldier settler was finally free to transfer the lease to any other applicant. The Queensland legislation was extended so that all honourably discharged Australian, British, Dominion and Allied ex-servicemen could apply for land.

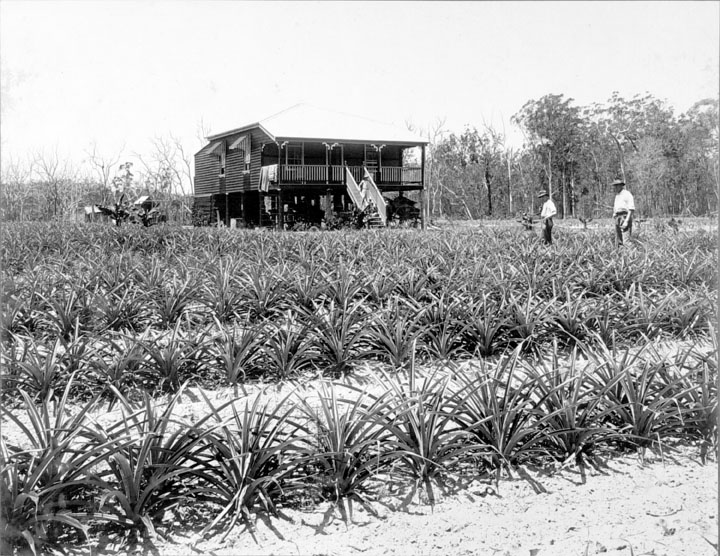
Soldiers pineapple farm, Beerburrum, 1918

The first land ballots were drawn on 6 November 1916 by the Queensland Governor's wife, Lady Elsie Goold-Adams. At this time the experimental farm had been in operation for six weeks training nine invalid soldiers. By July 1917, 28 returned soldiers had been allotted an area of 760 acres and 54 acres had been cleared, ploughed and planted with pineapples. One acre was similarly planted with oranges. Altogether 145 acres had been cleared, 11 houses had been erected and 17 farms had been fenced. Ringbarking had been completed on a further 100 acres. Two huts and eating facilities for 24 men had been erected, as well as a storeroom and quarters for the supervisor at the State Farm. In addition, several wells had been sunk, yielding good water. The area for township purposes had been reserved and a general store erected.

By January 1919, 96 soldier settlers were residing on the Beerburrum Soldier Settlement, increasing to 175 in July. With dependants, the total population was estimated at 400. The number of farms had increased to 379 comprising 14,896 acres and 181 houses had been erected, although 323 portions remained unallotted. The State Government had built administration buildings, blacksmith shop, school, school of arts, two stores, two butcher's shops, a barber, bakehouse, six residences for employees, an accommodation (boarding) house, depot store, kitchen, barracks and hospital. A branch store had been set up in Glasshouse Mountains township as well.

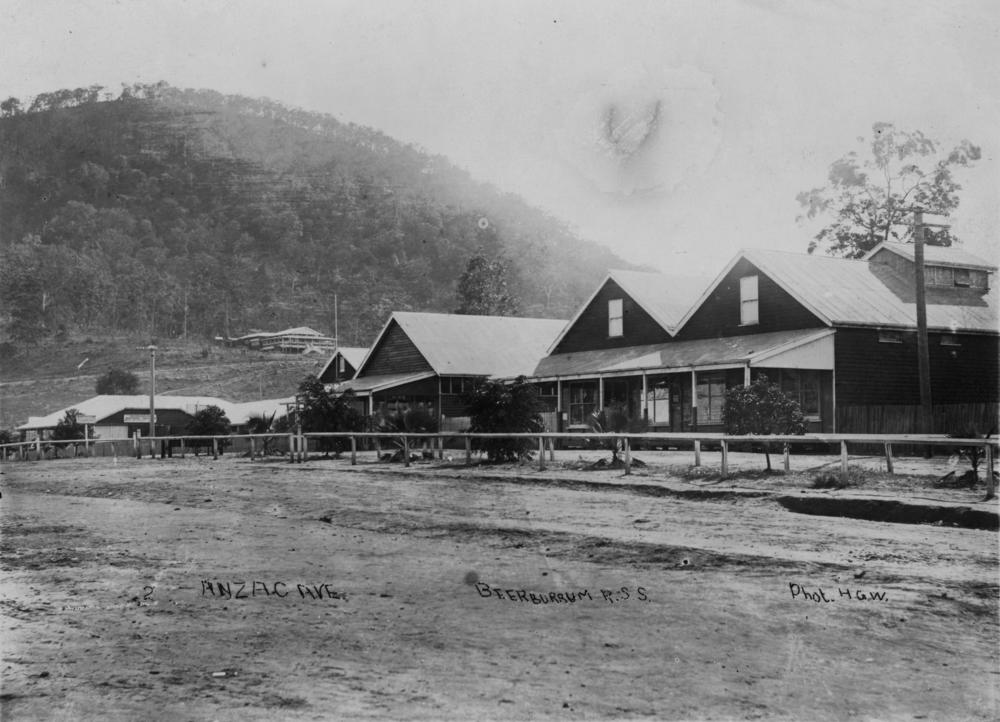
Anzac Avenue with young trees in the centre, circa 1921

In April 1919 the Beerburrum branch of the Returned Sailors' and Soldiers' Imperial League announced the intention of the settlers to plant "an avenue of trees" on the main road from the station, with the object of forming a permanent memorial for Anzac Day. These memorial trees were planted in the main street and the street renamed Anzac Avenue in honour of the fallen comrades of the soldier settlers. This occurred in conjunction with the widening and metalling of the roadway due to building development on the southern side of the street. The Anzac Avenue Memorial Trees are now listed on the Queensland Heritage Register.

The Prince of Wales (later Edward VIII) visited the Beerburrum Soldier Settlement on 3 August 1920. The following year, the Beerburrum Soldier Settlement reached it zenith with a population of 1,200 people.

St George's Anglican Church was dedicated on 20 August 1922 by Canon D.J. Garland. The building was originally built as a chapel at the Enoggera army barracks during World War I by the Soldiers' Church of England Help Society. Many of the furnishings and ornaments of the church were donated in memory of soldiers who had died, including the altar and its furnishings which were donated in the member of Earl Kitchener.

Many settlers were not successful as the poor soil and low pineapple prices made it impossible for them to make a living as pineapple growers. Settlers began to leave the settlement. Many wished to transfer to other settlements but the government would not approve this. In the 12 months to June 1923, 200 men, women and children left Beerburrum. The town began to suffer and businesses closed, and in January 1924 the government began reducing its administrative staff at Beerburrum. In August that year there were still 214 returned servicemen on the settlement. Of this number 127 had applied for and been granted adjoining land forfeited by their neighbours. In November a further 82 settlers requested transfer to other settlements.

The Revaluation Board of Soldiers' Settlements set up by the Queensland Government released a confidential report in October 1924 that advised there was very little prospect of the Beerburrum Settlement ever proving even a moderate success. By June 1928 only 75 soldier settlers remained in occupation at Beerburrum. Diversification into egg production, vegetable and watermelon growing had been the most profitable adjuncts that the farmers tried in order to survive financially. When the scheme was officially terminated in 1929, there were only 69 soldier settlers remaining at Beerburrum.

Due to the failure of the soldier settlement, St George's Anglican church fell into disuse. It was officially closed in August 1931, after which the church was moved to Maleny, where it was dedicated to St George on 6 September 1931 by Archbishop Sharp.

Signage to commemorate the Beerburrum Soldier Settlement was installed in 2008. This consists of three signs – one located on the eastern end of the median strip and two located centrally.
