= Anzac Avenue Memorial Trees =

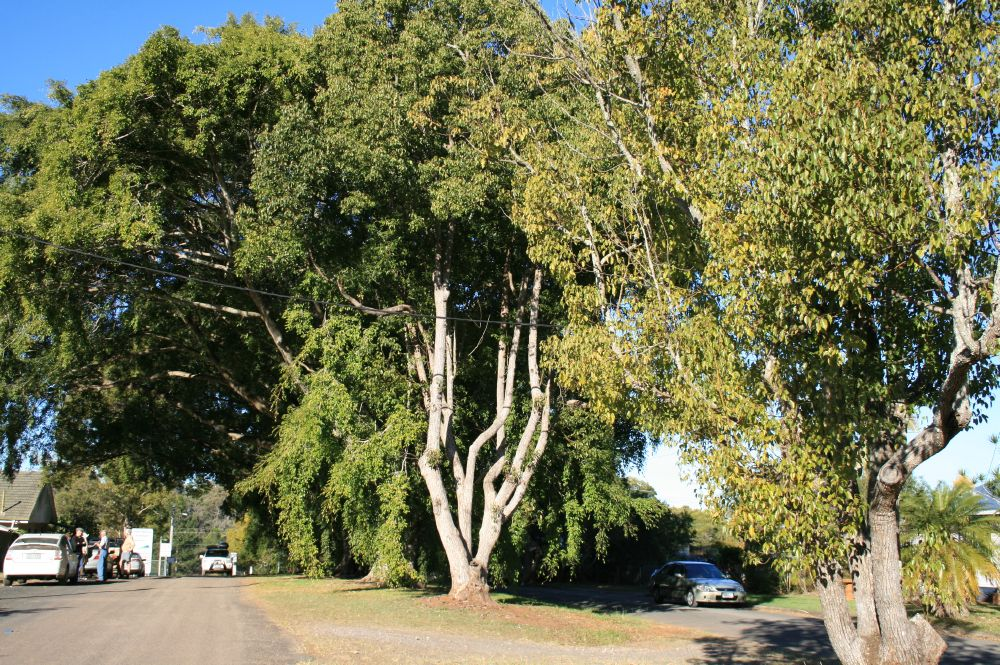
- Anzac Avenue Memorial Trees, 2007

- Location within Queensland Location within Australia
- 26.9597°S 152.9573°E
- Location: Anzac Avenue, Beerburrum, Sunshine Coast Region, Queensland, Australia

History
- Design period: 1919–1930s (interwar period)
- Built: 1920

Queensland Heritage Register
- Official name: Anzac Avenue Memorial Trees
- Type: state heritage (built)
- Designated: 16 October 2008
- Reference no.: 602678
- Significant period: 1920–
- Significant components: memorial – tree/avenue of trees

Anzac Avenue Memorial Trees is a heritage-listed memorial at Anzac Avenue, Beerburrum, Sunshine Coast Region, Queensland, Australia. It was built in 1920. It was added to the Queensland Heritage Register on 16 October 2008.

== History ==
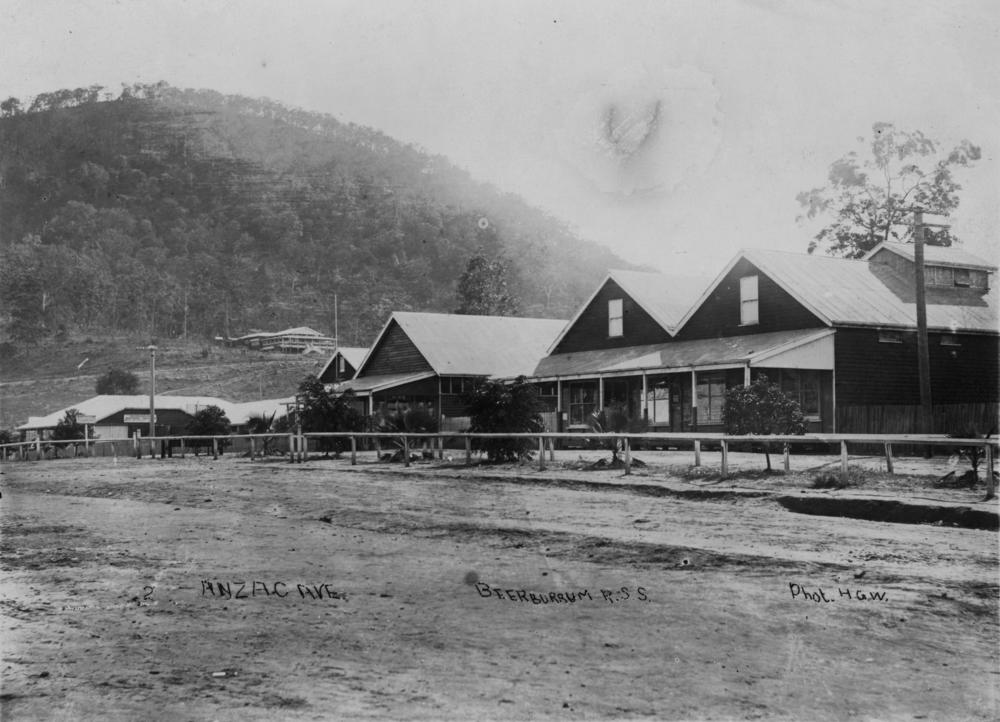
Young memorial trees in Anzac Avenue, ca. 1921

Memorial Trees were planted in the main street of the Beerburrum Soldier Settlement in 1920 and the street renamed Anzac Avenue in honour of the fallen comrades of the soldier settlers. This occurred in conjunction with the widening and metalling of the roadway due to building development on the southern side of the street.

As early as 1915 the Queensland government was looking for vacant land suitable for settlement by returned soldiers. The Department of Lands stated that Queensland's vast areas of crown land and varying climates provided more opportunities than any other State for the settling of returned soldiers, both Australian and British. It was envisaged that the land would be suitable for lighter farming activities such as fruit and vegetable growing, poultry-raising and bee-keeping.

The first land chosen for soldier settlement in Queensland was 53,000 acres (21,000 ha) near the Beerburrum railway siding on the North Coast railway line. This mostly dry sclerophyll forest and wallum heathland had been leased to the Federal government in 1910 as a military reserve for 30 years at a peppercorn rent. From 1913 the Federal government paid an annual rent of £1 subject to the right of resumption by the State of Queensland if required for State purposes. In 1916 the area was returned to the Queensland government for soldier settlement. The area eventually opened for this purpose stretched from Beerburrum to Glass House Mountains in the north, southwards to Elimbah and eastwards to Pumicestone Passage. Beerburrum Soldier Settlement was first and largest of the approximately two dozen Soldier Settlements established in Queensland. Over the course of the scheme (1916–1929) approximately 2,500 returned soldiers were settled on the land in Queensland, including at least 400 at Beerburrum.

Work began immediately on analysis and surveying of the land. Beerburrum was chosen as the centre of the soldier settlement because of satisfactory soil tests, water availability and the existing railway siding. Surveyor Muntz was given the task of dividing this large area into portions of suitable land varying in size from approximately 20 to 40 acres (8.1 to 16.2 ha). To ensure that each settler received a fertile selection, the surveyor was to mark his boundaries so that each portion would be equally productive. By November 1916, 11,600 acres (4,700 ha) had been surveyed into 310 portions. Joseph Rose, an experienced pineapple farmer, was placed in charge of the settlement. An experimental State training farm (portions 859, 860, 861, 862) was cleared and planted with pineapples for training returned soldiers in the growing of tropical crops.

Under the provisions of Queensland's 1917 Discharged Soldiers' Settlement Act after having received a qualification certificate from the Land Settlement Committee of the War Council, or from a Land Commissioner, applicants balloted for available selections and, if successful, were expected to pay 1 year's rent. This could either be paid in full at the time of occupation, or by ten equal instalments after taking up residence, in which case interest was added at the rate of 4% per annum. They were also expected to remain on the selection for a minimum period of 5 years, exceptions only being made in extreme cases of "illness, accident, or misfortune". From 5 to 10 years the lease could only be transferred to another returned serviceman. After ten years the soldier settler was finally free to transfer the lease to any other applicant. The Queensland legislation was extended so that all honourably discharged Australian, British, Dominion and Allied ex-servicemen could apply for land.

The first land ballots were drawn on 6 November 1916 by the Queensland Governor's wife, Lady Elsie Goold-Adams. At this time the experimental farm had been in operation for six weeks training nine invalid soldiers. By July 1917, 28 returned soldiers had been allotted an area of 760 acres (310 ha) and 54 acres (22 ha) had been cleared, ploughed and planted with pineapples. One acre was similarly planted with oranges. Altogether 145 acres (59 ha) had been cleared, 11 houses had been erected and 17 farms had been fenced. Ringbarking had been completed on a further 100 acres (40 ha). Two huts and eating facilities for 24 men had been erected, as well as a storeroom and quarters for the supervisor at the State Farm. In addition, several wells had been sunk, yielding good water. The area for township purposes had been reserved and a general store erected.

By January 1919, 96 soldier settlers were residing on the Beerburrum Soldier Settlement, increasing to 175 in July. With dependants, the total population was estimated at 400. The number of farms had increased to 379 comprising 14,896 acres (6,028 ha) and 181 houses had been erected, although 323 portions remained unallotted. The Queensland Government had built administration buildings, blacksmith shop, school, school of arts, two stores, two butcher's shops, a barber, bakehouse, six residences for employees, an accommodation (boarding) house, depot store, kitchen, barracks and hospital. A branch store had been set up in Glasshouse Mountains township as well.

In April 1919 the Beerburrum branch of the Returned Sailors' and Soldiers' Imperial League related the intention of the settlers to plant "an avenue of trees" on the main road from the station, with the object of forming a permanent memorial for Anzac Day.

The outpouring of grief in Australia that accompanied the deaths of 60,000 service people in World War I, and the fact that the dead were buried overseas, led to a period of memorial building across the nation. Memorials took many forms both functional and commemorative. Functional types included Anzac memorial parks, honour drives, heroes avenues and trees dedicated to soldiers. The siting of memorials considered their focal importance to the community with the concern being to find a prominent, spacious site to enable crowds and processions to converge at the memorials on Anzac Day. War memorials in Queensland were usually surrounded by a fence. This denoted a special commemorative area and provided some protection for the memorial. If a fence was not erected by the time of the unveiling or planting, it was added soon afterwards. Flagstaffs, which were needed for ceremonial occasions, were usually positioned behind or in proximity to war memorials.

Some time after 24 May 1920 and before the end of July the main street of Beerburrum was metalled on its southern side to the width of 24 feet (7.3 m) to match the metal roadway on the north side of the street, forming a divided road. In the middle, a 27-foot (8.2 m) wide strip was ploughed and planted with trees in memory of the fallen soldiers of World War I. The Week newspaper reported on 21 May that the first tree (a camphor laurel) had been planted by General William Birdwood, who also named the street Anzac Avenue. The Brisbane Courier stated on 5 August that the Beerburrum State School pupils had completed the planting of Anzac Avenue with 17 weeping figs, 16 Washingtonia palms and 4 pine trees. However, early photographs show the avenue plantings to be weeping figs, palms and presumably camphor laurels. This project was completed in time for the visit of the Prince of Wales (later Edward VIII) to Beerburrum on 3 August.

The cost of this improvement for the Lands Department was approximately £170. The Beerburrum Sub-Branch of the Returned Sailors' and Soldiers' Imperial League of Australia (RSSILA) raised £80 to fence around the trees. The memorial was dedicated to their fallen comrades. In the centre was a flagstaff.

The Beerburrum Soldier Settlement reached it zenith in 1921 with a population of 1,200 people. Thereafter settlers rapidly departed as the poor soil and low pineapple prices made it impossible for them to make a living as pineapple growers. Many wished to transfer to other settlements but the government would not approve this. In the 12 months to June 1923, 200 men, women and children left Beerburrum. The town began to suffer and businesses closed, and in January 1924 the government began reducing its administrative staff at Beerburrum. In August there were still 214 returned servicemen on the settlement. Of this number 127 had applied for and been granted adjoining land forfeited by their neighbours. In November a further 82 settlers requested transfer to other settlements.

The Revaluation Board of Soldiers' Settlements set up by the Queensland Government released a confidential report in October 1924 that advised there was very little prospect of the Beerburrum Settlement ever proving even a moderate success. By June 1928 only 75 soldier settlers remained in occupation at Beerburrum. Diversification into egg production, vegetable and watermelon growing had been the most profitable adjuncts that the farmers tried in order to survive financially. When the scheme was officially terminated in 1929, there were only 69 soldier settlers remaining at Beerburrum.

Of the original 38 trees reportedly planted in Anzac Avenue at Beerburrum only 13 trees remain. Eleven of the total of 24 trees on the road reserve are Australian native trees, some of which were planted on Friday 13 December 1968, to commemorate the Beerburrum State School Golden Jubilee and others to commemorate the bi-centenary of Matthew Flinders' ascent of Beerburrum Mountain on 26 July 1799. The original timber fence that surrounded the memorial plantings, which had short stout posts supporting a diamond cut rail and demarcated a turnaround in front of the State store, is no longer extant.

== Description ==
Anzac Avenue Memorial Trees at Beerburrum comprise 13 trees – one pine, seven camphor laurel and five fig trees planted in alignment along the centre of Anzac Avenue. The spaces between these trees range from 5 to 18.4 metres (16 to 60 ft) indicating that original trees have died or been removed, including all the palm trees shown in photographs c. 1920-1921. Two turning points across the median strip exist near the centre of the plantings linking the northern and southern surfaces of Anzac Avenue, although only one existed originally.

Most of the trees are mature and probably date from the original planting while three camphor laurels in the centre of the row are smaller and may have replaced trees that died. Located between trees 3 and 4 from the western end of the avenue is a cluster of 11 trees of younger appearance that were planted on 13 December 1968 to commemorate the Beerburrum State School Golden Jubilee.

Signage to commemorate the Beerburrum Soldier Settlement was installed in 2008. This consists of three signs – one located on the eastern end of the median strip and two located centrally.

== Heritage listing ==
Anzac Avenue Memorial Trees was listed on the Queensland Heritage Register on 16 October 2008 having satisfied the following criteria.

The place is important in demonstrating the evolution or pattern of Queensland's history.

The planting of memorial trees and the renaming of the main street at Beerburrum as Anzac Avenue in 1920, in honour of the Beerburrum Soldier Settlers' fallen comrades, demonstrates the widespread social movement expressing Australian patriotism and grief that commenced in the year following the Anzac Day landing at Gallipoli. Communities across Queensland and Australia responded to the losses of World War I soldiers by creating memorials to the fallen.

The Anzac Avenue Memorial Trees are remnant evidence of the Beerburrum Soldiers' Settlement, which was the first and largest of approximately two dozen soldier settlements established throughout Queensland. Operating from 1916 the Soldier Settlement Scheme in Queensland settled approximately 2,500 returned soldiers on the land, with at least 400 of them at Beerburrum. Although part of the Australia-wide initiative to assist returned World War I servicemen, in Queensland the Soldier Settlement Scheme was also part of the government's attempt to further closer settlement of Queensland's vast, unalienated areas of land.

While many memorial avenues were planted by Queensland communities, the Anzac Avenue Memorial Trees are the only identified memorial created by returned servicemen of a soldier settlement scheme in honour of their fallen comrades. Its main street location highlights its importance to the soldier settler community.

The place is important in demonstrating the principal characteristics of a particular class of cultural places.

The Anzac Avenue Memorial Trees are part of the class of functional memorials created to remember the impact of World War I through plantings dedicated to the memory of the fallen. Like other memorials throughout Queensland, the Anzac Avenue Memorial Trees were sited in a prominent position – the main street of Beerburrum Soldier Settlement – indicating their focal importance within the life of the local community.

The place has a special association with the life or work of a particular person, group or organisation of importance in Queensland's history.

The Anzac Avenue Memorial Trees have a special association with the Beerburrum Soldier Settlers who proposed and created the memorial in honour of their fallen comrades. Commencing in 1916 at least 400 returned servicemen took up land around Beerburrum in the Beerburrum Soldier Settlement, the first and largest settlement in Queensland, and attempted to establish themselves as pineapple farmers with government support through training, land clearing, house building and loans.
