= Queensland Soldiers' Comforts Fund =

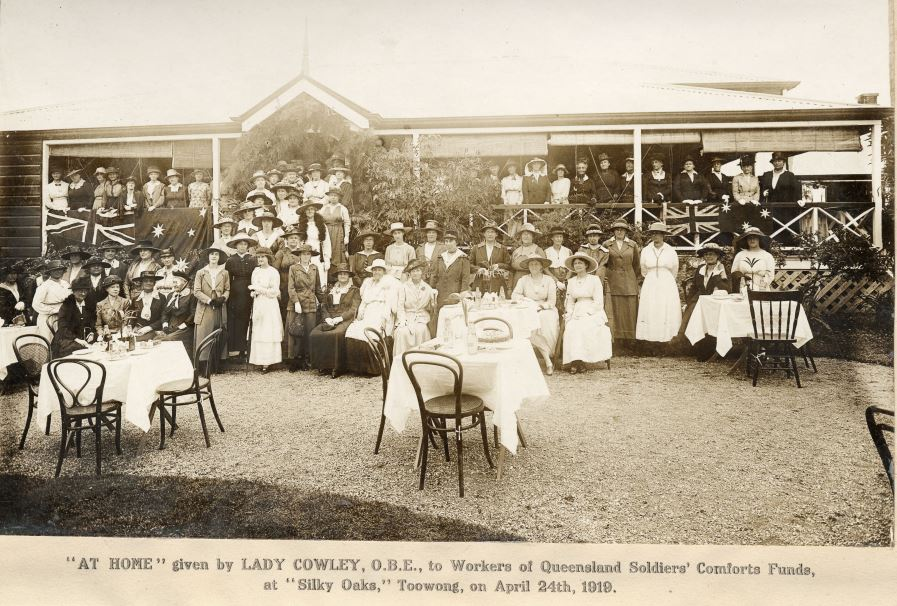
"At Home" given by Lady Cowley, O.B.E., to workers of Queensland Soldiers' Comforts Funds, at "Silky Oaks", Toowong on 24 April 1919

Queensland Soldiers' Comforts Fund, a working subdivision of the Australian Comforts Fund, was established during World War I. The purpose of the Fund was to provide comforts to soldiers on active service. This was achieved via appeals for donations, public subscriptions, and organising fundraising activities. Numerous branches of the Queensland Soldiers' Comforts Fund were spread throughout Queensland, Australia during this period.

== Formation ==
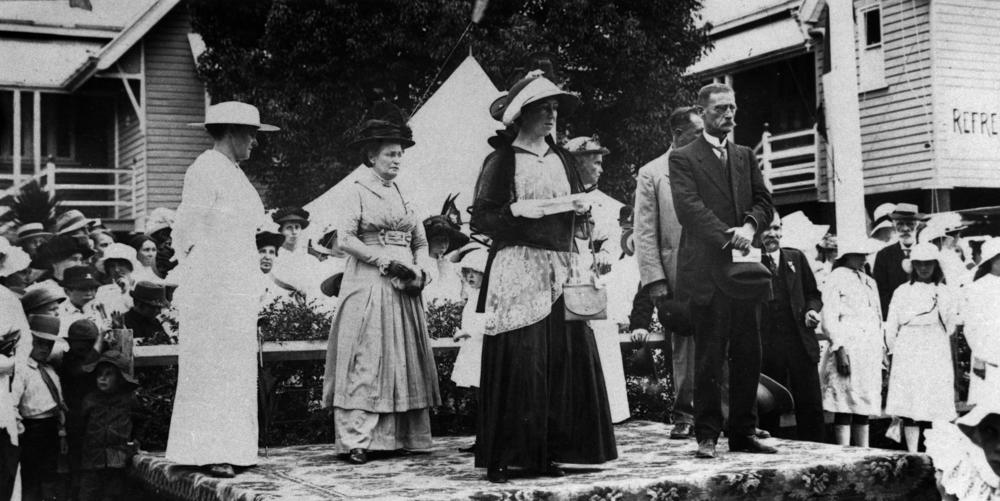
Lady Elsie Goold-Adams at the opening of the Red Cross Fete at Junction Park School, Annerley, Brisbane, 1916

Queensland Soldiers' Comforts Fund was inaugurated at a public meeting convened by the Mayoress of Brisbane on 21 September 1915. A committee for the fund was formed with Lady Elsie Goold-Adams, wife of the Governor of Queensland Sir Hamilton John Goold-Adams, elected as patroness, and Lady Cowley, wife of former politician Sir Alfred Cowley, appointed president. Premises for the operation of the Queensland Soldiers' Comforts Fund was secured at Panbury House in Eagle Street, Brisbane.

== Comfort packages ==
One of the committee's first activities was to appeal for public donations of various items that could be dispatched to soldiers overseas in time for Christmas. Accepted items included shirts, undershirts with short sleeves, mufflers, balaclava caps, handkerchiefs, writing pads, envelopes, pencils, pipes, tobacco, cigarettes, bootlaces, toothbrushes, toothpaste, soap, Vaseline, sweets, coffee, games, books and magazines.

By the end of World War I, the Queensland Soldiers' Comfort Fund declared that since October 1915 they had packed and shipped 5,010 cases to soldiers overseas, which included 17,324 shirts and 37,983 pairs of socks.

== Branches ==
Queensland Soldiers' Comforts Fund established a number of branches outside of their main Brisbane office. These included Ayr, Beaudesert, Beerwah, Benaraby, Bowen, Bundaberg, Caboolture, Calliope Valley, Charters Towers, Degilbo, Emu Creek, Eumundi, Goondiwindi, Ipswich, Isis Girls' Club, Kedron, Laidley, Lake Clarendon, Longreach, Many Peaks, Mapleton, Maroochy River, Maroon, Memerambi, Mitchell, Morven, Mount Morgan, Nambour, Nanango, Ormiston, Poona, Pialba, Sandgate, Tallebudgera, Townsville, Tiaro, Toogoolawah, Warra, Wattle Branch and Wynnum.

== Fundraising initiatives ==
Queensland Soldiers' Comfort Fund oversaw several fundraising operations.

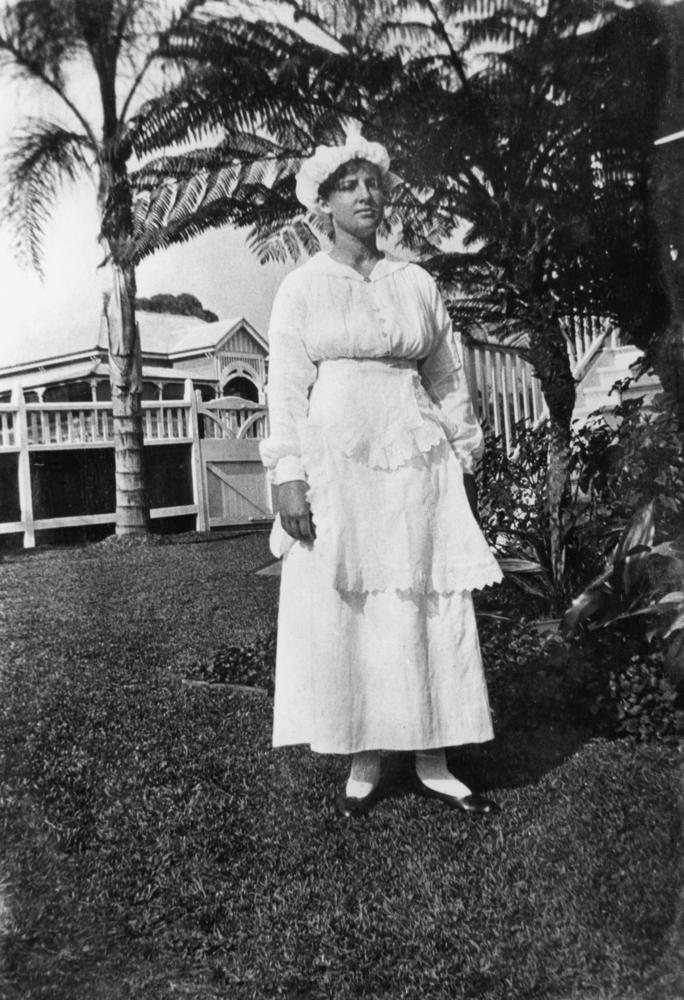
Hazel Campbell in Coo-ee Cafe uniform, 1917

=== Coo-ee Cafe ===
The Coo-ee Cafe was a volunteer-run cafe initially situated in the basement of the Brisbane Club building in Adelaide Street, Brisbane, before moving to the ground floor. The cafe was in operation between 6 February 1917 and 23 November 1918. During this period over £7,600 (approximately 40 percent of profits made by the cafe) were contributed to various comforts funds.

=== War-time Kitchen ===
War-time Kitchen in Southport, Queensland was opened in September 1917 and operated by volunteers. The kitchen sold home-made cakes, sweets, jams and pickles. Seventy-five percent of profits made went towards the Queensland Soldiers' Comforts Fund, averaging £40 per month.

=== Jam Shop ===
Situated in a shop in the Podmore and Hall building in Adelaide Street, Brisbane, the Jam Shop sold home-made jams and pickles to the public. The shop averaged £25 per month of profits for the Fund.

=== Refreshment stall at the Brisbane Exhibition ===
During the annual Brisbane Exhibition at the Exhibition Grounds in 1917 and 1918, the Queensland Soldiers' Comforts Fund maintained its own refreshment stall, selling sandwiches, fruit and soft drinks with proceeds going toward the Fund. The stall realized profits of £301 and £640 respectively.
