= Alfred Davey =

Alfred Davey may refer to:

- Alfred Davey (Australian politician)
- Alfred Davey (New Zealand politician)
