= John G. Smith =

John G. Smith may refer to:

- John G. Smith (poet) (died 1891), 19th century Scottish poet
- John Gordon Smith (surgeon) (1792–1833), Scottish surgeon and professor of medical jurisprudence
- John Gordon Smith (politician) (1863–1921), member of the Queensland Legislative Council
- J. Gregory Smith (1818–1891), Governor of Vermont
- John G. Smith (coach) (1924–1998), American college baseball, football and basketball coach
- John Smith (Maine politician), Mayor of Saco, Maine and Ku Klux Klan supporter

== See also ==
- John Smith (disambiguation)
