= George Thompson =

George Thompson may refer to:

== Politics ==
- George Lowther Thompson (1786–1841), Member of Parliament (MP) for Haslemere, and Yarmouth, Isle of Wight
- George Thompson (abolitionist) (1804–1878), British anti-slavery lecturer and MP for Tower Hamlets
- George Thompson (shipowner) (1804–1895), founder of the Aberdeen Line and Liberal MP for Aberdeen
- George W. Thompson (politician) (1806–1888), Virginia politician and lawyer
- George L. Thompson (1864–1941), New York politician
- George F. Thompson (1870–1948), New York politician
- George E. Thompson (1904–1973), American judge and prosecutor
- George Thompson (Wisconsin politician) (1918–1982), Attorney General of Wisconsin
- George Thompson (Scottish National Party politician) (1928–2016), Scottish National Party politician, MP for Galloway
- George Thompson (Australian politician) (born 1945), former Australian politician
- George Henry Thompson (1848–1940), member of the Queensland Legislative Council

== Sports ==
- George Thompson (basketball) (1947–2022), American basketball player
- George Thompson (cricketer) (1877–1943), English Test cricketer
- George Thompson (footballer, born 1884) (1884–?), winger for Sheffield United and Derby County in the 1900s, and manager for Luton Town
- George Thompson (footballer, born 1895) (1895–?), played for Burnley, Rotherham and Ashington in the 1920s
- George Thompson (footballer, born 1900) (1900–1968), goalkeeper for York City and Southampton in the 1920s
- George Thompson (footballer, born 1926) (1926–2004), goalkeeper for Scunthorpe United, Preston North End, Manchester City and Carlisle United in 1950s and 1960s
- George Thompson (Australian footballer) (1906–1986), Australian rules footballer
- George Thompson (American football) (1899–1939), American football player

== Other ==
- George Thompson (aviator) (1888–1912), one of Colorado's earliest aviators
- George Thompson (engineer) (1839–1876), British engineer who served in Paraguay during the Paraguayan War
- George Thompson (traveller), author of a two-volume travelogue Travels and Adventures in South Africa
- George Thompson (VC) (1920–1945), Scottish recipient of the Victoria Cross
- George Thompson, musical director of the Grimethorpe Colliery Band, early 1950s to 1972
- George A. Thompson (businessman) (1921–2000), American inventor and businessman
- George A. Thompson (geologist) (1919–2017), Stanford geophysicist, winner of the Penrose Medal in 2008
- George Peter Thompson (1819–1889), Liberian-born educator, clergyman and missionary
- George W. Thompson (Medal of Honor) (1847–?), American soldier and recipient of the Medal of Honor
- George William Thompson (born 1956), American international trade attorney and adjunct professor

== See also ==
- George Thomson (disambiguation)
- Georgia Thompson, Wisconsin civil servant
- Georgie Thompson, English television presenter
