= Isidore Perel =

Australian politician (1872–1928)

The Hon Isidore Perel

Member of the Queensland Legislative Council
- In office 10 October 1917 – 23 March 1922

Personal details
- Born: Irvine Perel; 1872 Ararat, Victoria, Australia
- Died: 23 October 1928 (aged 55 or 56) Albion, Queensland, Australia
- Resting place: Toowong Cemetery
- Party: Labor
- Spouse(s): Amy Anna Brooks (m. 1892), Henrietta Mary Hurford (m. 1901 d. 1968)
- Occupation: Electrician, newspaper editor

Irvine "Isidore" Perel (1872 – 23 October 1928) was a member of the Queensland Legislative Council.

Perel was born in Ararat, Victoria, to Louis Perel and his wife Elizabeth (née Brand). He was educated in Ararat and worked as an electrician for the PMG in Bundaberg and Townsville. Perel was also editor of the Patriot newspaper in Bundaberg, transferring it to Brisbane in 1893.

== Political career ==
When the Labour Party starting forming governments in Queensland, it found much of its legislation being blocked by a hostile Council, where members had been appointed for life by successive conservative governments. After a failed referendum in May 1917, Premier Ryan tried a new tactic, and later that year advised the Governor, Sir Hamilton John Goold-Adams, to appoint thirteen new members whose allegiance lay with Labour to the council.

Perel was one of the thirteen new members, and went on to serve for four and a half years until the council was abolished in March, 1922.

== Personal life ==
Perel was married twice, firstly to Amy Anna Brooks in 1892, then in 1901 to Henrietta Mary Hurford (d.1968) with his second marriage producing 4 sons and three daughters. He died at his Albion home in October 1928 and was buried in Toowong Cemetery.
