= William Colborne =

Australian politician

The Hon William Colborne

Member of the Queensland Legislative Council
- In office 19 February 1920 – 23 March 1922

Personal details
- Born: William Parry Colborne; 1859 Ipswich, Suffolk, England
- Died: 8 July 1945 (aged 85) Brisbane, Queensland, Australia
- Party: Labor
- Spouse(s): Catherine Kelly (m.1890 died 1904), Kathleen Mary Davey (m.1908 died 1946),
- Occupation: Printer

William Parry Colborne (1859 – 8 July 1945) was a member of the Queensland Legislative Council.

== Early life ==
Colborne was born at Ipswich, Suffolk, England to Thomas Sendall Colborne and his wife Elizabeth (née Chamberlain). Arriving in Australia around 1882, he took up work as a printer in Brisbane. He became involved with the Queensland Typographical Association and Printing Industry Employees' Union and served as its secretary from 1903 until 1939. He was also President of the Queensland Trades and Labor Council.

== Political career ==
At the 1902 Queensland state election, Colborne, was the Labour candidate for the seat of Toombul but was defeated by the sitting member, Andrew Petrie.

When the Labour Party starting forming governments in Queensland, it found much of its legislation being blocked by a hostile Council, where members had been appointed for life by successive conservative governments. After a failed referendum in May 1917, Premier Ryan tried a new tactic, and later that year advised the Governor, Sir Hamilton John Goold-Adams, to appoint thirteen new members whose allegiance lay with Labour to the council. The council, however, continued to reject the government's money bills and in 1918 Ryan advised Goold-Adams to appoint additional Labour members, but this time he refused the request.

In 1920, the new Premier Ted Theodore appointed a further fourteen new members to the Council with Colborne amongst the appointees. He served for two years until the Council successfully voted for its abolishment, which took effect in March 1922.

== Personal life ==
Colborne married Catherine Kelly at Ipswich in 1890 and together had six children. Catherine died in 1904 and in May 1908 he married Kathleen Mary Davey in Brisbane. William and Kathleen's son, Colin Colborne served as a Labor member of the New South Wales Legislative Council.

Colborne died in July 1945 and was cremated at Mount Thompson Crematorium.
