= General Power =

General Power may refer to:

- Ash Power (born 1957), Australian Army lieutenant general
- Manley Power (1773–1826), British Army major general
- Thomas S. Power (1905–1970), U.S. Air Force general

== See also ==
- Attorney General Power (disambiguation)
