= Australian Comforts Fund =

Australian organisation

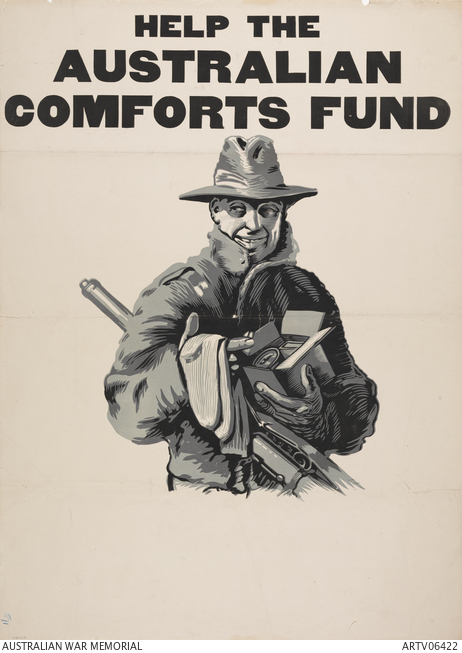
- Poster asking for support for the ACF
- Formation: 24 August 1916 (WWI); January 1940 (WWII)
- Dissolved: 16 April 1920 (WWI); 27 June 1946 (WWII)

Australian Comforts Fund (ACF) was an Australian umbrella organisation for voluntary bodies set up after the outbreak of World War I. Many men and women worked at the ACF, including Alice Berry and Cyril Docker in WW2.

== World War I ==
The Australian Comforts Fund was formally established nationally on 24 August 1916, although there was efforts in this direction at a state level. Irene Victoria Read was said to have lobbied the organisation from No 2 General Hospital in Egypt in 1915.

The ACF provided 12 million mugs of tea for soldiers in the trenches during the course of the war.

The Australian Comforts Fund was dissolved on 16 April 1920.

== World War II ==
The Australian Comforts Fund was re-established in January 1940 to assist with World War II.

The Australian Comforts Fund was dissolved once more on 27 June 1946.

== See also ==
- Queensland Soldiers' Comforts Fund
