= Timothy Donovan =

The Hon Timothy Donovan

Member of the Queensland Legislative Council
- In office 19 February 1920 – 23 March 1922

Personal details
- Born: Timothy John Donovan; 1873 Brisbane, Queensland, Australia
- Died: 27 August 1939 (aged 65 or 66) Sydney, Australia
- Party: Labor
- Spouse: Ann Martha Bennett (m. 1904, d. 1967)
- Occupation: Newspaper manager

Timothy John Donovan (1873 – 27 August 1939) was a member of the Queensland Legislative Council.

== Early life ==
Donovan was born at Brisbane, Queensland to Timothy James Donovan and his wife Maria Grace (née White) and educated at Brisbane Normal School. His involvement with The Worker newspaper began when he was a boy and he ended up becoming its manager.

== Political career ==
When the Labour Party starting forming governments in Queensland, it found much of its legislation being blocked by a hostile Council, where members had been appointed for life by successive conservative governments. After a failed referendum in May 1917, Premier Ryan tried a new tactic, and later that year advised the Governor, Sir Hamilton John Goold-Adams, to appoint thirteen new members whose allegiance lay with Labour to the council. The council, however, continued to reject the government's money bills and in 1918 Ryan advised Goold-Adams to appoint additional Labour members, but this time he refused the request.

In 1920, the new Premier Ted Theodore appointed a further 14 new members to the Council with Donovan among the appointees. He served for two years until the council was abolished in March 1922.

Donovan's political career ended in 1924 as an alderman with the Brisbane City Council. He then moved to Sydney in 1926 to take up an appointment as manager of The Australian Worker newspaper, holding the position until ill health forced his retirement from the job several months before his death.

== Personal life ==
On 19 October 1904, Donovan married Ann Martha Bennett in Brisbane and together had two daughters. He was a member of the Australian Workers' Union, helped establish the Queensland Rugby League, and was a life member of the Australian Natives' Association.

Donovan died in Sydney in August 1939, and was cremated at Woronora crematorium.
