= Jeremiah Francis Donovan =

Australian politician (1873–1949)

The Hon Jeremiah Donovan

Member of the Queensland Legislative Council
- In office 19 February 1920 – 23 March 1922

Personal details
- Born: Jeremiah Francis Donovan; 1873 Cork, Ireland
- Died: 12 December 1949 (aged 75 or 76) Brisbane, Queensland, Australia
- Resting place: Toowong Cemetery
- Party: Labor
- Occupation: Police officer, publican

Jeremiah Francis Donovan (1873 – 12 December 1949) was a member of the Queensland Legislative Council.

== Early life ==
Donovan was born at Cork, Ireland to Cornelius Donovan and his wife Ellen (née Gallagher). Before leaving for Australia, he served with the Royal Irish Constabulary. He continued his police service in Queensland, where he joined the Queensland Police, specializing in fingerprinting.

== Political career ==
When the Labour Party starting forming governments in Queensland, it found much of its legislation being blocked by a hostile Council, where members had been appointed for life by successive conservative governments. After a failed referendum in May 1917, Premier Ryan tried a new tactic, and later that year advised the Governor, Sir Hamilton John Goold-Adams, to appoint thirteen new members whose allegiance lay with Labour to the council. The council, however, continued to reject the government's money bills and in 1918 Ryan advised Goold-Adams to appoint additional Labour members, but this time he refused the request.

In 1920, the new Premier Ted Theodore appointed a further 14 new members to the Council with Donovan amongst the appointees. He served for two years until the council was abolished in March 1922.

== Personal life ==
Donovan was proprietor of the Transcontinental, Treasury, and City View hotels in Brisbane.

Dying in December 1949, Donovan's funeral was held at St Stephen's Cathedral and proceeded to the Toowong Cemetery.
