= Gerald Page-Hanify =

The Hon Gerald Page-Hanify
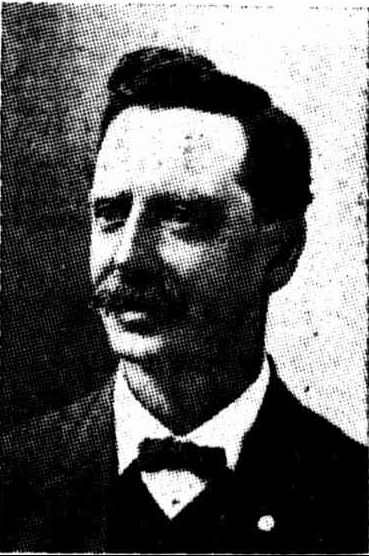
- Gerald Page-Hanify

Member of the Queensland Legislative Council
- In office 10 October 1917 – 11 February 1922

Personal details
- Born: Gerald Page-Hanify; 23 July 1860 Ararat, Victoria, Australia
- Died: 11 February 1922 (aged 61) Miles, Queensland, Australia
- Resting place: Bulimba Cemetery
- Party: Labor
- Spouse: Katherine Salisbury (m.1886 d.1939)
- Occupation: Accountant

Gerald Page-Hanify (23 July 1860 – 11 February 1922) was a member of the Queensland Legislative Council.

== Early life ==
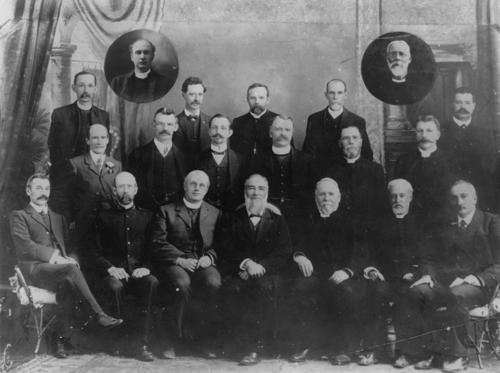
Executive Bible in State Schools League Queensland, Gerald Hanify-Page is second from the left in the back row

Page-Hanify was born at Ararat, Victoria, to Michael John Page-Hanify and his wife Annie Mary Josepha (née Lane). He was educated in Ararat and worked as an accountant.

He was a member of the International Order of Good Templars, serving as its Grand Chief from 1908 to 1916. He was also president of the Total Abstinence Society, chairman of the Six O'Clock Closing League, and chairman of the Queensland Termperance Alliance.

== Political career ==
When the Labour Party starting forming governments in Queensland, it found much of its legislation being blocked by a hostile Council, where members had been appointed for life by successive conservative governments. After a failed referendum in May 1917, Premier Ryan tried a new tactic, and later that year advised the Governor, Sir Hamilton John Goold-Adams, to appoint thirteen new members whose allegiance lay with Labour to the council.

Page-Hanify was one of the thirteen new members, and went on to serve for four and a half years until his death in February 1922, just one month before the council was abolished.

== Personal life ==
Page-Hanify married Katherine (Kittie) Salisbury at All Saints Anglican Church, Brisbane in 1886 and together had two sons, Cecil and Gerald Herbert.

In February 1922, Gerald Page-Hanify travelled to Miles as part of his masonic duties, a trip that he had delayed for some weeks due to ill-health. He had not sought medical assistance as he did not believe his illness was serious. However, having arrived in Miles, he was admitted to the local hospital where he died of heart failure. His funeral proceeded from his Norman Park, Brisbane, residence to the Bulimba Cemetery.

His son Cecil Page-Hanify was the Registrar of the University of Queensland from 1935 to 1957.
