= Edmund Carter (cricketer, born 1845) =

English cricketer and clergyman (1845–1923)

Personal information
- Full name: Edmund Sardinson Carter
- Born: 3 February 1845; Malton, Yorkshire, England
- Died: 23 May 1923 (aged 78); Scarborough, North Riding of Yorkshire, England
- Batting: Right-handed
- Bowling: Underarm

Domestic team information
- Years: Team
- 1865–1868: Oxford University
- 1868–69: Victoria
- 1876–1881: Yorkshire

Career statistics
Competition	FC
Matches	29
Runs scored	503
Batting average	13.59
100s/50s	0/2
Top score	63
Balls bowled	1,766
Wickets	39
Bowling average	18.21
5 wickets in innings	0
10 wickets in match	0
Best bowling	4/58
Catches/stumpings	16/0
- Source: Cricinfo, 5 June 2023

Edmund Sardinson Carter (3 February 1845 – 23 May 1923) was an English first-class cricketer and clergyman. He played for Oxford University, Victoria and Yorkshire.

== Life and career ==
Born in Malton, Yorkshire, the son of the rector of Slingsby, Yorkshire, Carter was educated at Durham School, for whom he played from 1861 to 1864, captaining the team for his last two years. He attended Worcester College, Oxford, playing for the university eleven from 1865 to 1868 and gaining his blue in 1866 and 1867. He also rowed in the University eight, gaining blues in 1867 and 1868.

On one day at Oxford in 1868, Carter played cricket, rowed several times, and was caught in the rain. He contracted pleurisy as a consequence, and on the advice of his doctor, travelled to Australia in an effort to recover. While in Victoria he played one first-class game for the Victorian team. He made his highest first-class score of 63 in this game, and the highest score on either side, as Victoria beat New South Wales by 78 runs in Sydney. A few weeks later, after a six-week stay in Australia, he returned to England aboard the SS Agamemnon.

As a boy Carter played for the Langton Wold Cricket Club, later known as the Vale of Derwent Cricket Club. In 1864 he joined the Yorkshire Gentlemen. He took 9 for 0 for Ealing Cricket Club against Willesden Cricket Club in 1874. Between 1876 and 1881, Carter played in 14 matches for Yorkshire. His final first-class outing was for I Zingari in 1882. He continued to play for the Yorkshire Gentlemen up to 1900. He served on the Yorkshire committee for many years. He invited Lord Hawke to play for Yorkshire, and also introduced Ted Peate to the county.

Carter followed his father into the church, becoming a curate and rector and a composer of hymns and church music. His first clerical appointment was in 1871 as curate of Christ Church, Ealing, where he helped to form the Ealing Cricket Club with Tom Hearne. He was vicar of St Martin-cum-Gregory, York, from 1876 to 1882, when he was appointed vicar of St. Michael-Le-Belfry in York. He was later a Vicar Choral and the Sub-Chanter of York Minster. He served at York Minster for 33 years before taking up the rectorship of Thwing in 1908, where he remained for the last 15 years of his life.

Carter married Rosa Blaydon in Slingsby in September 1869. They had a large family. He died in May 1923 in Scarborough, Yorkshire, aged 78. His younger brother, Arthur Carter, played one game of first-class cricket for the MCC.
