= Hamilton Cuffe Jones =

Australian politician and trade union official

The Hon Hamilton Jones
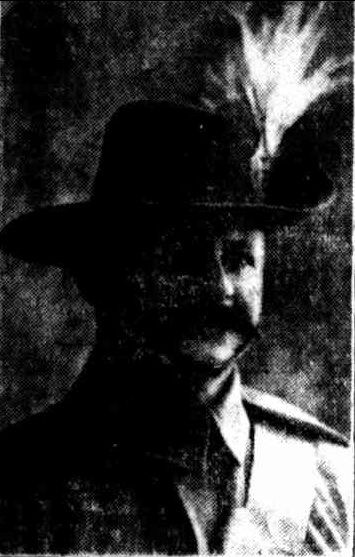
- Hamilton Cuffe Jones, 1917

Member of the Queensland Legislative Council
- In office 10 October 1917 – 23 March 1922

Personal details
- Born: Hamilton Cuffe Jones; 1884 London, England
- Died: 16 January 1960 (aged 75 or 76) Brisbane, Queensland, Australia
- Spouse(s): Eleanor Sissie Beattie (m. 1917), Emma Henry (m. 1938)
- Occupation: Sawyer, trade union official

Hamilton Cuffe Jones (1884 – 16 January 1960) was a trade union official and member of the Queensland Legislative Council.

== Early life ==
Jones was born at London, England, to Phillip Allen Jones his wife Theresa (née Culley). He came to Australia at a young age, attended Brisbane State School, then began work in the timber industry as a Sawyer.

Beginning his career with the trade union movement, Jones was Secretary of the Timber Workers' Union and a representative on the Wages Board at the Gas works office. He then later on served as vice-president of the Waterfront Workers' Federation.

In World Was One, Jones joined the Australian Imperial Force where, as a member of the 2nd Light Horse Regiment he fought at Gallipoli, having his right thumb blown off.

== Political career ==
When the Labour Party starting forming governments in Queensland, it found much of its legislation being blocked by a hostile Council, where members had been appointed for life by successive conservative governments. After a failed referendum in May 1917, Premier Ryan tried a new tactic, and later that year advised the Governor, Sir Hamilton John Goold-Adams, to appoint thirteen new members whose allegiance lay with Labour to the council.

Jones was one of the thirteen new members, and went on to serve for four and a half years until the council was abolished in March 1922.

Jones was the endorsed Labor candidate for Kurilpa in the 1926 election but was unable to defeat the long-time sitting member James Fry.

== Personal life ==
Jones was twice married, firstly to Eleanor Sissie Beattie in 1917, and together had three sons. He then married Emma Henry in 1938 and together had a son and daughter.

Jones died in Brisbane on 16 January 1960. He was cremated at Mount Thompson Crematorium and his ashes were interred there.
