= Robert Mulvey =

Australian politician

The Hon Robert Mulvey

Member of the Queensland Legislative Council
- In office 19 February 1920 – 23 March 1922

Personal details
- Born: Robert Joseph Mulvey; 24 November 1868 Brisbane, Australia
- Died: 24 April 1937 (aged 68) Brisbane, Australia
- Resting place: Redcliffe Cemetery
- Party: Labor
- Occupation: Trade union secretary

Robert Joseph Mulvey (24 November 1868 – 24 April 1937) was a trade union secretary and member of the Queensland Legislative Council.

Mulvey was born at Brisbane, Queensland, to William Mulvey and his wife Margaret Holmes (née McKechnie) and was educated in Brisbane. He secretary of the Moulders' Union from 1897 to 1908, secretary of the Eight-Hour Day Committee from 1906 to 1923, and secretary of the Queensland Trades and Labor Council from 1923 to 1935.

== Political career ==
When the Labour Party starting forming governments in Queensland, it found much of its legislation being blocked by a hostile Council, where members had been appointed for life by successive conservative governments. After a failed referendum in May 1917, Premier Ryan tried a new tactic, and later that year advised the Governor, Sir Hamilton John Goold-Adams, to appoint thirteen new members whose allegiance lay with Labour to the council.

In 1920, the new Premier Ted Theodore appointed a further fourteen new members to the Council with Mulvey amongst the appointees. He served for two years until the council was abolished in March 1922.

== Personal life ==
Mulvey died in Brisbane in April 1937 and was buried at the Redcliffe Cemetery.
