= Ernest Purnell =

The Hon Ernest Purnell
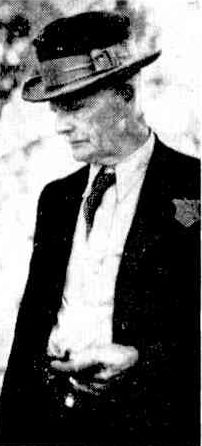
- Ernest Purnell, 1938

Member of the Queensland Legislative Council
- In office 10 October 1917 – 23 March 1922

Personal details
- Born: Ernest Bracher Purnell; 27 September 1866 Swansea, Wales
- Died: 25 July 1954 (aged 87) Rockhampton, Queensland, Australia
- Party: Labor
- Spouse: Annie Kelly (m. 1894, d.,1933)
- Occupation: Miner, trade union secretary

Ernest Bracher Purnell (27 September 1866 – 25 July 1954) was a Trade union secretary and member of the Queensland Legislative Council.

Purnell was born at Swansea, Wales to Thomas Purnell and his wife Caroline (née Bracher). He worked in Broken Hill as a miner before moving to Rockhampton where he began a long association with the Waterside Workers' Federation including the role of secretary for 37 years until 1938.

== Political career ==
When the Labour Party starting forming governments in Queensland, it found much of its legislation being blocked by a hostile Council, where members had been appointed for life by successive conservative governments. After a failed referendum in May 1917, Premier Ryan tried a new tactic, and later that year advised the Governor, Sir Hamilton John Goold-Adams, to appoint thirteen new members whose allegiance lay with Labour to the council.

Purnell was one of the 13 new members, and went on to serve for four and a half years until the council was abolished in March 1922.

== Personal life ==
On 16 February 1894, Purnell married Annie Kelly in Rockhampton and together had seven children. A member of the Ancient Order of Druids, Purnell died in Rockhampton in July 1954 and was cremated.
