= George Henry Thompson =

Australian politician

The Hon George Thompson

Member of the Queensland Legislative Council
- In office 19 February 1920 – 23 March 1922

Personal details
- Born: George Henry Thompson; 1848 Gulgong, New South Wales, Australia
- Died: 9 June 1940 (aged 91 or 92) Brisbane, Queensland, Australia
- Party: Labour Party
- Spouse: Margaret Ann Dunn (m.1888 d.1929)
- Occupation: Compositor

George Henry Thompson (1848 – 9 June 1940) was a member of the Queensland Legislative Council.

Thompson was born at Gulgong, New South Wales, to George Thompson and his wife Martha and educated at the Gulgong State School. He began his working career in Gulgong as an apprentice compositor, and while there he earned a reputation as a fast amateur foot runner and a fine athlete. The beginning of 1885 saw Thompson in Brisbane working for the Brisbane Courier but left to work for the Boomerang newspaper after an altercation with management.

When the Boomerang ceased publication in 1891 Thompson found part-time work with the Brisbane Government Printing Office until in the early 1890s he moved over to The Worker, a newspaper with ties to the Labour Party. Blacklisted from being employed by the conservative Queensland Government in 1902, the ban was eventually lifted in 1904 and Thompson once again began work there. During Brisbane's 1912 general strike, he was one of two government employees who were refused re-employment when the strike came to its end and found work with The Daily Standard, another newspaper with ties to Labour. While there he worked his way up to overseer of the compositing room before a disagreement with the editor-manager saw him demoted to the reading room and as a result, retiring.

== Political career ==
Thompson's first attempt to enter Queensland Parliament came in 1902 when, as a Labour candidate, he contested the seat of Fortitude Valley, losing to fellow Labour member, Frank McDonnell.

When the Labour Party starting forming governments in Queensland, it found much of its legislation being blocked by a hostile Council, where members had been appointed for life by successive conservative governments. After a failed referendum in May 1917, Premier Ryan tried a new tactic, and later that year advised the Governor, Sir Hamilton John Goold-Adams, to appoint thirteen new members whose allegiance lay with Labour to the council.

In 1920, the new Premier Ted Theodore appointed a further fourteen new members to the Council with Thompson amongst the appointees. He served for two years until the council was abolished in March 1922.

== Personal life ==
On 19 September 1888, Thompson married Margaret Ann Dunn (died 1929) at Brisbane and together had two daughters. After a relatively short illness, he died in Brisbane in June 1940 and was privately cremated.
