= George Sutherland Thomson =

Scottish biochemist (1871–1958)

George Sutherland Thomson FRSE FCS (1871–1958) was a 20th-century Scottish biochemist and scientific author, and an expert in the dairy industry.

== Life ==
He was born in Scotland in 1871.

In 1903 he was elected a Fellow of the Royal Society of Edinburgh. His proposers were Robert Patrick Wright, George Alexander Gibson, James Blyth and Ralph Stockman.

In March 1904 he was appointed Government Dairy Expert to Queensland in Australia. He became Dairy Commissioner for South Australia.

He died on 29 June 1958.

== Publications ==
- The Dairying Industry (1907)
- British Colonial Dairying for School, Farm and Factory (1913)
- Experiments in the Hand-Feeding of Cows
- Grading Dairy Produce (1925)
- Butter and Cheese (1925)
- Testing Milk and its Products (1926)
- Milk and Cream Testing
- Dairying: Paying for Fat in Milk and Cream (1939)
