= Francis Isidore Power =

The Hon Francis Power
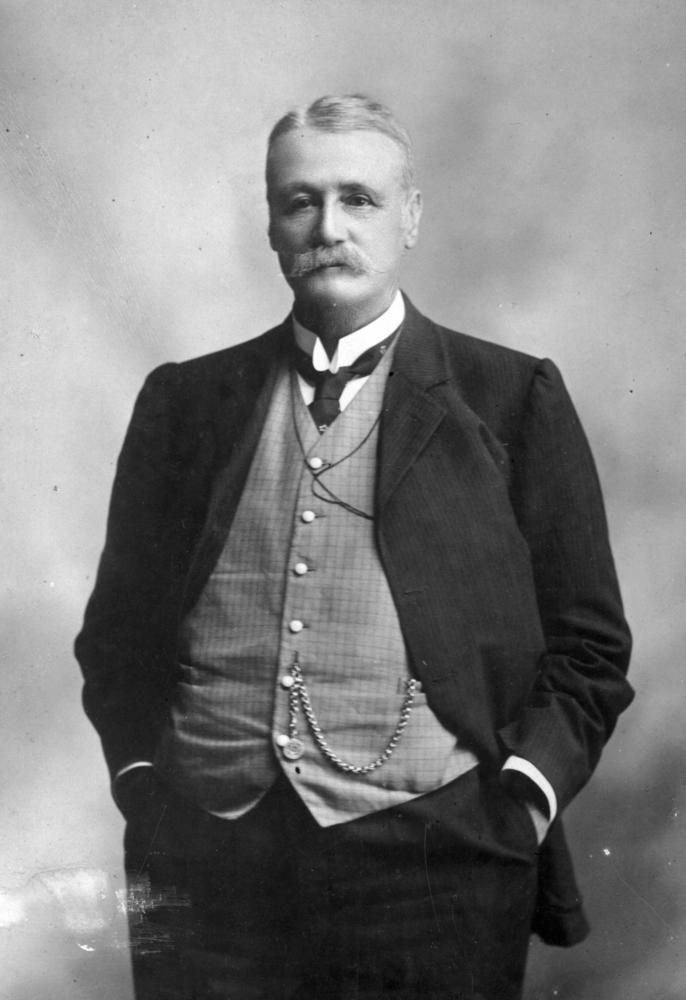

Member of the Queensland Legislative Council
- In office 15 July 1901 – 24 June 1912

Personal details
- Born: Francis Isidore Power; 28 February 1852 South Brisbane, Colony of New South Wales
- Died: 24 June 1912 (aged 60) Gympie, Queensland, Australia
- Resting place: Gympie Cemetery
- Spouse: Elizabeth Plunkett (m.1887 d.1936)
- Occupation: Solicitor

Francis Isidore Power (1852–1912) was a solicitor and politician in Queensland, Australia. He was a Member of the Queensland Legislative Council.

== Early life ==
Francis Isidore Power was born on 28 February 1852 at South Brisbane, the son of Michael Power and his wife Anna Maria (née Connolly). About 12 years old, he was sent to Ireland to attend the Clongowes Wood College in County Kildare and then Trinity College in Dublin. He worked in a firm of solicitors for 5 years before returning to Queensland in 1873. He established himself as a solicitor in Gympie.

== Politics ==
Power was involved in local government, serving on the Glastonbury Divisional Board and the Widgee Divisional Board. He developed a flood prevention scheme for the Gympie goldfields, which led to his appointment as the first chairman of the Gympie Drainage Board.

Power was appointed to the Queensland Legislative Council on 15 July 1901. From 19 November 1907 to 18 February 1908, he was Minister for Justice and Attorney-General and Representative of the Government in Legislative Council. He served on the council until his death on 24 June 1912.

== Later life ==
Power died on 24 June 1912 at Gympie. He was buried in the Gympie Cemetery on 26 June 1912.

== See also ==
- Members of the Queensland Legislative Council, 1900–1909; 1910–1916
