= Peter MacPherson =

The Hon Peter MacPherson

Member of the Queensland Legislative Council
- In office 1 July 1881 – 12 September 1913

Personal details
- Born: Peter MacPherson; 29 March 1841 Arbroath, Forfarshire, Scotland
- Died: 12 September 1913 (aged 72) Brisbane, Queensland, Australia
- Resting place: Toowong Cemetery
- Spouse: Louisa Blanche Cooper (m.1867 d.1915)
- Occupation: Solicitor

Peter MacPherson (29 March 1841 – 12 September 1913) was a member of the Queensland Legislative Council.

MacPherson was born in 1841 at Arbroath, Forfarshire, Scotland to Donald Macpherson and his wife Marion and was educated at Arbroath and Alloa public schools. After arriving in Australia he was a senior partner in Macpherson, Green & Macpherson, Solicitors.

He was appointed to the Queensland Legislative Council in July 1881 and served for thirty-two years until his death in September 1913.

In 1867, MacPherson married Louisa Blanche Cooper and together they had seven children. He died in 1913 and was buried in Toowong Cemetery.
