= Arthur Carter (cricketer) =

English cricketer and clergyman

Personal information
- Full name: Arthur Carter
- Born: 28 March 1848; Old Malton, Yorkshire, England
- Died: 9 April 1923 (aged 75); Thrussington, Leicestershire, England
- Batting: Right-handed
- Bowling: Right-arm roundarm fast
- Relatives: Edmund Carter (brother)

Domestic team information
- Years: Team
- 1885: Marylebone Cricket Club

Career statistics
Competition	First-class
Matches	1
Runs scored	8
Batting average	8.00
100s/50s	–/–
Top score	8
Catches/stumpings	1/–
- Source: Cricinfo, 9 May 2021

Arthur Carter (24 March 1848 – 9 April 1923) was an English first-class cricketer and clergyman.

The son of The Reverend William Carter, he was one of six children and was born in March 1848 at Old Malton, Yorkshire. Carter later studied at Pembroke College, Cambridge. After graduating from Cambridge, he took holy orders in the Anglican Church, being ordained as a deacon in 1871. His first ecclesiastical post was at Hanbury, where he was appointed curate in the same year as his ordination. He returned to his native Yorkshire in 1872, taking up the curacy of St Luke's in Leeds, a post he held until 1875. He was a sub-chanter at Ripon Cathedral later in 1875, before being moving south to Hertfordshire, where he was appointed curate of Shephall in 1876. The following year he was appointed to the curacy of Tewin, a post he held until 1887.

While resident at Tewin, Carter played first-class cricket for the Marylebone Cricket Club (MCC) against Sussex at Lord's in 1885. Batting once in the match, he was run out for 8 runs in the MCC first innings. He also played minor matches for Hertfordshire from 1878 to 1883. He later held a series of ecclesiastical posts in Europe, where he was an assistant chaplain at Cannes in France in 1889–90, at Gibraltar in 1890–1891, before returning to England to take up the assistant chaplaincy at Beaulieu, Hampshire. He then returned north, becoming vicar at Thrussington in Leicestershire until his death. Carter died at the Home Hospital in Leicester on 9 April 1923, following an operation. His brother, Edmund, was also a first-class cricketer and clergyman.
