= George Thomson (rose breeder) =

Australian amateur rose breeder

- Born: George Thomson; Scotland
- Occupation: Rosarian
- Known for: rose breeder

George Thomson was an Australian hybridist and amateur rose breeder, known for creating disease-resistant roses tailored to the Australian climate.

Thomson was born in Scotland and trained with Alex Cocker of Cockers Roses in Aberdeen, at the rose gardens at Sissinghurst Castle and also completing an apprenticeship at Kew Gardens.

He earnt a Diploma in Horticulture and Professorship in Animal Husbandry in the United Kingdom and joined the British Army.

In the mid-1950s the Thomson family emigrated to take up dairy farming in Victoria with George following in 1958 at 22 years of age.

In 1958, Thomson emigrated to South Australia, settling in Willunga, near Adelaide. He was employed as foreman at Centennial Park Cemetery, Adelaide and managed a dairy farm.

== Career as a hybridist ==
Thomson was considered to be one of Australia's most productive rose breeders, planting over 350,000 seeds each year. He worked closely with long established rose nursery Ross Roses, contributing new roses to its 'True Blue' collection, which is bred specifically for the Australian climate.

In 2016 the Australian bred rose, Fields of Fromelle became the first Australian bred rose to be planted in France. To do this the rose was exported to a nursery in the Netherlands and then planted at the ‘Australian War Cemetery’ in Fromelles and at the ‘Battle of Fromelle Museum’.

He moved to Narracorte, South Australia in 2019, still undertaking rose breeding as a hobby.

Thomson died on 8 October 2023.

== Awards and recognition ==
In 1999 he was awarded the Australian Rose Award in recognition of his work. He was a member of the South Australian Rose Society and the Australian Rose Breeders Association.

== Notable roses ==
George Thomson roses include:

- Fields of Fromelle (2022) planted at the Australian War Cemetery in Fromelle.
- Jurlique Rose (2014) for Jurlique to celebrate the company's 30th Anniversary.
- Society Belle (2008).
- Crown Princess Mary (2006), named after Mary, Crown Princess of Denmark.
- Lady Phella (2005), winner of a bronze medal at the National Rose Trial Garden of Australia.
- Qingdao Rose (2001), a red rose for the Qingdao Rose Garden, South terrace, Adelaide.
- Wildfire (2000), a rose featuring yellow, orange and red clusters, created for the created a CFS and emergency services fund.
- Mrs Mary Thomson (1996).
- Howard Florey (1998), named after Nobel Prize-winning scientist Lord Howard Florey.
- Hans Heysen, believed to be of ‘Pierre de Ronsard’ parentage.

== External sources ==
- List including Thomson roses from Australian Rose Breeders Association
- Burke's Backyard information about the 'True Blue' rose collection
