= John Gordon Smith (politician) =

The Hon John Smith
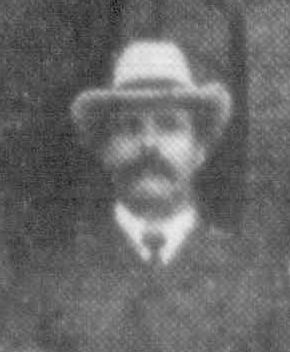
- John Gordon Smith, 1905

Member of the Queensland Legislative Council
- In office 19 February 1920 – 19 June 1921

Personal details
- Born: John Gordon Smith; 1863 Rhynie, Aberdeenshire, Scotland
- Died: 19 June 1921 (aged 57 or 58) Brisbane, Queensland, Australia
- Resting place: Toowong Cemetery
- Spouse: Annie Coles (m.1884 d.1940)
- Occupation: Publican, small-business owner

John Gordon Smith (1863 – 19 June 1921) was a member of the Queensland Legislative Council.

Smith was born at Rhynie, Aberdeenshire, Scotland, to William Smith and his wife Christina (née Duncan). He was a publican in Maryborough and the proprietor of a night coffee stall in Queen Street, Brisbane, in 1900. Smith was President of the British Associated Friendly Societies Dispensary as well as a Past Grand Master of the Ancient Order of Foresters.

== Political career ==
When the Labour Party starting forming governments in Queensland, it found much of its legislation being blocked by a hostile Council, where members had been appointed for life by successive conservative governments. After a failed referendum in May 1917, Premier Ryan tried a new tactic, and later that year advised the Governor, Sir Hamilton John Goold-Adams, to appoint thirteen new members whose allegiance lay with Labour to the council.

In 1920, the new Premier Ted Theodore appointed a further fourteen new members to the Council with Smith amongst the appointees. He served until his death in June the next year.

== Personal life ==
On 11 January 1884, Smith married Annie Coles and together had one son and four daughters. He died in Brisbane in June 1921 and was buried at Toowong Cemetery.
