= Timothy O'Shea (business executive) =

Irish-American business executive

- Born: February 18, 1935; New York City, United States
- Died: January 18, 1988 (aged 52); Washington, D.C.
- Occupation: Business executive
- Known for: Business executive in Westinghouse Corp and politics

Timothy Joseph O'Shea Jr. (February 18, 1935 - January 18, 1988) was an Irish-American business executive for the Westinghouse Corporation, Department of Commerce official, and educational activist.

== Early life ==
O'Shea was born in New York City in 1935 to Timothy Joseph O'Shea and Margaret Kessel. The elder O’Shea, a clerk, was the son of Northern Irish immigrants. O'Shea would later go to and graduate from Fordham University before pursuing a career in the army in the late 50s and 60s, where he earned the position of Captain.

== Career ==
In 1956, he joined Westinghouse, working in Pittsburgh, New York City, Elmira, New York and East Springfield, New York for the company. In 1967 he became the company's European Marketing Director, living in London. In 1970 he moved to the Washington area and became part of the President's Interchange Program, a two-year program where business executives took positions within the federal government. In his tenure, he worked in the Department of Commerce's Office of Program Analysis and as the Director of Marketing there. He returned to Westinghouse in 1972 as the Director of Trade in the Governmental Affairs Office, but continued a career in policy. He had been a President of the Washington Export Council, the Presidential Exchange Executives Association, and the Potomac Seneca Democratic Club by the time of his death. In 1982 he ran an unsuccessful Democratic campaign for the Montgomery County Board of Education, running on a moderate ticket. However, O’Shea still took part in educational activism in the county after his loss, chairing a task force organized by the Board of Education to investigate inequities within county schools.

== Death and legacy ==
On January 18, 1988, O'Shea died after a heart attack in the George Washington University Hospital and is buried in Arlington National Cemetery. He is the namesake of Watkins Mill High School's Timothy O'Shea Theater.
