= Elsie Goold-Adams =

Canadian Australian philanthropist (1882–1952)

Lady Elsie Goold-Adams
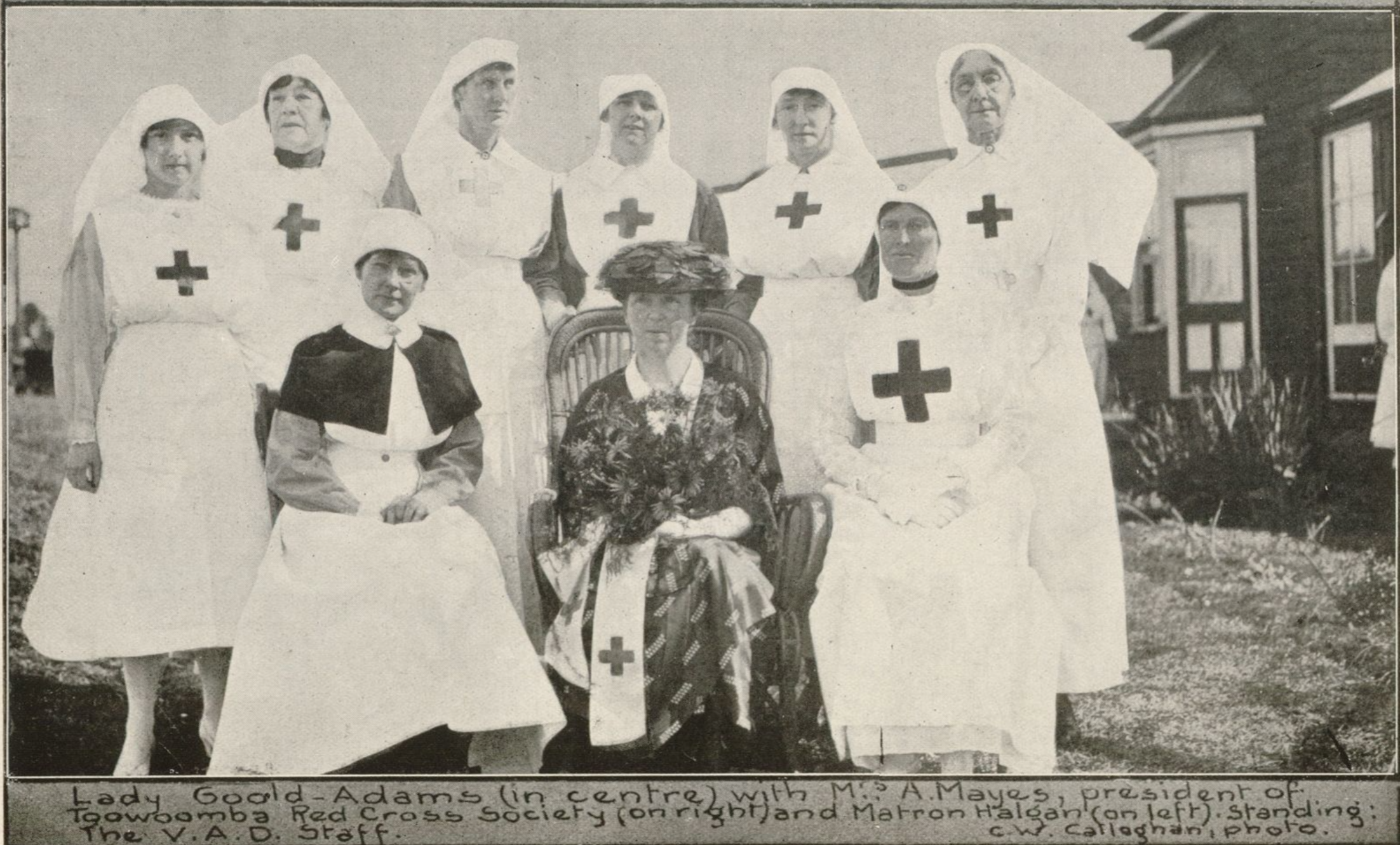
- Lady Goold-Adams 1919
- Born: Elsie Riordan; 1882; Montreal, Canada
- Died: 26 August 1952 (aged 69–70); Spalding, Lincolnshire, England
- Known for: Founder and inaugural President of the Queensland division of the Australian Red Cross

Lady Elsie Goold-Adams (née Riordan; 1882 – 26 August 1952) was a Canadian-born Australian who was the inaugural president of the Queensland division of the Australian Red Cross and led the activities of the division during World War I. During this time she was also a charity patron for causes relating to supporting soldiers in the war effort, advancing the roles of women, and child education and welfare. She was married to Sir Hamilton John Goold-Adams, the 12th Governor of Queensland.

== Early life ==
Goold-Adams was born Elsie Riordan in 1882, in Montreal, Canada one of four children of Edith Susan Ellis of Toronto, and Charles Alfred Riordan of Ireland. In 1911, while in London, she married Sir Hamilton John Goold-Adams, a soldier and colonial administrator. In March 1915, Hamilton took up the position as the 12th Governor of Queensland, and they moved to Australia.

== Career ==
Goold-Adams lived in Australia for five years and resided at Fernberg, Queensland's Government House. In that time she was actively involved in League of Women's Relatives of Sailors and Soldiers. She was fluent in eight languages other than English, French, German, Italian, Spanish, Turkish, Russian, Greek, and Arabic. She also established a vegetable garden at the bottom of the front lawn.

Goold-Adams was the President of the Queensland branch of the Australian Red Cross. When war broke out, in August 1914, Lady Helen Munro Ferguson established the Australian branch of the British Red Cross Society, which was the foundation of the Australian Red Cross. Ferguson saw an opportunity for the Australian Red Cross to be led by women, and contacted the wives of the governor generals of all states of Australia, making them members of the central organisation, and invited them to establish their own local branches. At the time there was no Governor of Queensland, as the previous governor had retired in July 1914, and there was as interim lieutenant-governors presiding until a new governor was appointed. As such, Ferguson sent the invitation to Lady Alice Augusta Morgan, who established the branch, which Goold-Adams was to preside over when she and her husband arrived in April 1915 after he had been appointed Governor.

Goold-Adams said of the women who worked for the Red Cross:

“I am certain the men of Queensland will not hesitate to acknowledge the fact nor begrudge most of the credit being given to their wives and sisters for what has been done by the Red Cross.”

Goold-Adams hosted Red Cross fundraising events at Government House.

=== Charity patron ===
During her time at Government house in Queensland, Goold-Adams was also involved in charity work outside of the Red Cross. She was involved in organising the Queensland Soldiers' Comforts Fund, and she was the Patron for a number of charitable organisations and events for causes such as those supporting the advancement of Women, the benefit of Children, and supporting the soldiers in the war effort.

- The Sailors' Day.
- The Harbour Lights Guild.
- The Soldiers' sock fund.
- The League of Women Relatives of Sailors and Soldiers.
- Fill the Christmas Stockings for Soldiers' children fund.
- Scottish Women's Hospitals Fund organised by Wilhelmina Hay Abbott.
- The Creche and Kindergarten Association.
- The Queensland Ladies' Basketball Association.
- The Queensland Ladies' Kennel Club.
- The Corinda Babies' Home.
- School Girls Swimming Association.
- The Women's Mutual Service Club.
- The Sunbeam Entertainment Club.
- The Wattle Club Committee
- The Brisbane Ladies' Rowing Club.

On behalf of the Playground Association, Goold-Adams opened Queensland's first free children's book library on 15 June 1918 at Ithica. This was the second known free children's library in Australia.

Goold-Adams initiated the Queensland branch of the Girl Guides, by hosting a meeting at Government House for its establishment on 15 November 1919.

In October, 1915, Goold-Adams's husband adjudicated a competition between Queensland boy scout clubs regarding their efforts contributing to the Red Cross war effort, and Goold-Adams presented the winning club with a flag known as the 'Lady Goold-Adams colours'. The flag had a union jack and the scouts badge, with gold trimmings and tassels, It became a yearly competition for the scouts, with the winner being presented with the flag known as the 'Lady Goold-Adams colours' to be held by the winning club for the year. As of 2022, the flag was on display at the Scouts Queensland Heritage Centre.

== Later life and death ==
In January 1920, Goold-Adams sailed for England with her family. However, on the journey they stopped in Cape town, where her husband Hamilton had previously worked. Before getting off the ship Hamilton contracted a chill which developed into pleurisy and pneumonia. He spent five weeks in hospital, and died on 20 April 1920.

In June 1921, while living in England, Goold-Adams received an invitation from the Queensland branch of the Royal Geographical Society of Australasia to attend the French Geographical society's centenary celebration in Paris.

Goold-Adams died in England on 26 August 1952.
