= Arthur Horatio Parnell =

The Honourable Arthur Parnell

Member of the Queensland Legislative Council
- In office 3 March 1908 – 23 March 1922

Personal details
- Born: Arthur Horatio Parnell; 14 October 1852 Pimlico, London, England
- Died: 4 April 1933 (aged 80) Taringa, Queensland, Australia
- Resting place: Toowong Cemetery
- Spouse: Barbara Elizabeth Esther Warry (m.1877 d.1896)
- Education: St. Mark's College, Chelsea
- Occupation: Butcher, barrister, general store manager, bullocky

Arthur Horatio Parnell (14 October 1852 – 4 April 1933) was a member of the Queensland Legislative Council.

== Early years ==
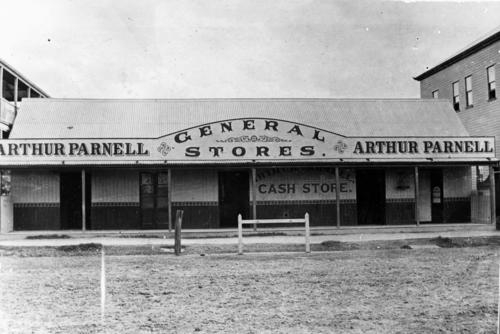
Storefront of the Arthur Parnell General Store in Barcaldine, Qld

Parnell was born at Pimlico, London, to Horatio Inglis Parnell and his wife Louisa (née Davis). He attended St John's College, Battersea before going on to St Mark's College, Chelsea and in 1871, his family sailed to Australia aboard the Light Brigade. Within a few weeks of having arrived, his father died in Rockhampton.

Parnell started work at a station in the St Lawrence area of Queensland and later managed a general store in Peak Downs. He eventually ran his own general store and two of his sons continued on the business.

== Political career ==
Parnell began his political career in local councils. He was a member of the Livingstone Shire Council, and chairman of both the Kargoolnah and Barcaldine Divisional Boards.

As an independent, Parnell contested the seat of Barcoo in the 1893 colonial election but was defeated by the Labour candidate, George Kerr. He moved to Rockhampton and was often asked to once again stand for election at a state level but always refused and instead became of member of the Rockhampton Council in 1902, eventually going on to be mayor in 1904 and 1907.

In March 1908, he was appointed by William Kidston to the Queensland Legislative Council and served for 14 years until the council was abolished in March 1922. By then he had virtually retired from politics and was living at Taringa in Brisbane, having moved there in 1913.

== Personal life ==
On 24 May 1877, Parnell married Barbara Elizabeth Esther Warry (d.1896) and together had 10 children. Survived by three sons, four daughters and a step-daughter, Parnell died at his home in April 1933. His funeral was a private affair and proceeded from his Taringa home to the Toowong Cemetery.
