= Alfred Davey (Australian politician) =

The Hon Alfred Davey
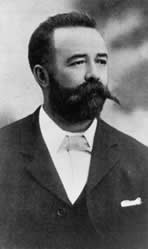

Queensland Legislative Council
- In office 12 July 1906 – 23 March 1922

Personal details
- Born: Alfred Allen Davey; 18 March 1856 Sussex, England
- Died: 27 June 1941 (aged 85) Toowong, Queensland, Australia
- Spouse: Matilda Margaret Lobb (d.1928)

Alfred Allen Davey (18 March 1856 – 27 June 1941) was member of the Queensland Legislative Council.

== Early life ==
Davey was born in Sussex, England to Allen Davey and his wife Ann (née Martin).

== Political career ==
Davey was called up to the Queensland Legislative Council in July 1906 and served till the council was abolished in March 1922.

== Personal life ==
Davey married Matilda Margaret Lobb in London, and together had one child.

He died in June 1941 and was cremated.
