= William Frederick Taylor =

Australian surgeon and legislator (1840-1927)

The Hon William Taylor
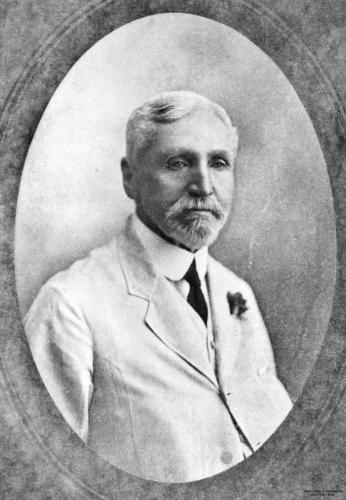

Member of the Queensland Legislative Council
- In office 17 April 1886 – 23 March 1922

Personal details
- Born: William Frederick Taylor; 27 April 1840 London, England
- Died: 29 June 1927 (aged 87) Brisbane, Queensland, Australia
- Resting place: Toowong Cemetery
- Spouse: Isabella Graham (m. 1873, d. 1927)
- Relations: Ernest Bell (son-in-law)
- Occupation: Surgeon

William Frederick Taylor (27 April 1840 – 29 June 1927) was an Australian surgeon and member of the Queensland Legislative Council.

== Early life ==
Taylor was born in 1840 in London, England to Joseph Taylor, a Canadian engineer, and his wife Hannah (née Lambert). The family soon moved to Canada and he was educated at Kingston Grammar School and Queen's University, Kingston where he graduated in medicine with honours.

== Medical career ==
In 1862, Taylor returned to England and became Licentiate of the Apothecaries Society in London. Before long he sailed to Melbourne in 1863 and shortly afterwards moved to Hay, New South Wales, where commenced practice as a surgeon. In 1866 Taylor was back in London, working at Guy's Hospital and moving to Paris to work at the Hôtel-Dieu de Paris and Hôpital de la Charité. He went back to England and became a member of the Royal College of Surgeons before once again leaving for Australia.

From 1870 Taylor practised in Queensland, initially in Clermont before moving to Warwick, also acting as visiting doctor at the local hospital and being elected to the local council as an alderman. In 1883 he returned to England for further training in ophthalmology and ear, nose and throat surgery. He returned to Queensland as one of only a few specialists with similar training, and was appointed honorary ophthalmologist at Brisbane Hospital in 1888. In 1911 he was appointed consultant ophthalmologist at Mater Misericordiae Hospital, Brisbane.

Taylor was a founding member of the Medical Society of Queensland in 1882 and in 1894 became the founding president of the Queensland branch of the British Medical Association.

== Political career ==
Taylor was appointed to the Queensland Legislative Council in April 1886, serving for 36 years till it was abolished in 1922. During this time he was chairman of committees, holding the role from September 1913 till November 1920. He took every opportunity to promote up-to-date hygiene methods for the community.

== Personal life ==
While in Clermont in 1873, Taylor married Isabella Graham, the daughter of John Graham. They had five children, including one daughter who went on to marry Ernest Bell, the future member for Fassifern.

Taylor died in May 1930. His funeral moved from 'Rolyat', his residence in Ashgrove, to the Toowong Cemetery.
