= Arthur Carter (politician) =

Australian businessman and politician (1847-1917)

The Honourable Arthur Carter
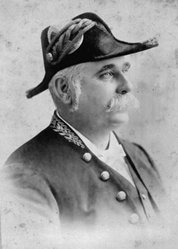

Member of the Queensland Legislative Council
- In office 15 July 1901 – 4 November 1917

Personal details
- Born: Arthur John Carter; 27 September 1847 St Ives, Huntingdonshire, England
- Died: 4 November 1917 (aged 70) Brisbane, Queensland, Australia
- Resting place: South Brisbane Cemetery
- Education: King's College, London
- Occupation: Diplomatic service

Arthur John Carter (27 September 1847 – 4 November 1917) was an English born prominent businessman in Australia, Australian Consul to Norway and a Member of the Queensland Legislative Council (1901–17) who was made an officer of the Académie française in 1911 and received the Norwegian Order of St Olav in 1912.

== Early life ==
Carter was born on 27 September 1847 at St Ives, Huntingdonshire, England, the son of Charles Carter, a Wesleyan minister, and his wife Margaret (née Jarvis). He was educated at Woodhouse Grove School, Bedford Modern School and King's College London.

== Career ==
Following university, Carter moved briefly to France before returning to become an underwriter at Lloyd's of London in 1863. In January 1871, Carter emigrated to Brisbane, Australia by the Light Brigade.

Soon after his arrival in Brisbane, Carter joined the merchants J. & G. Harris where he remained until 1876. He ‘became Brisbane manager of the Adelaide Milling & Mercantile Co., and held directorships in Millaquin Sugar Co., John Hicks & Co., Dath Henderson & Co. and J. Leutenegger Limited, and was chairman of directors of E. Rich & Co. Limited and of Queensland Trustees Limited. He was also agent for several overseas insurance companies’.

== Consulships and wider interests ==
Following in the footsteps of the Queensland politician George Harris, Carter became Vice-Consul for Sweden and Norway, consular agent for France in 1902 and Consul for Norway in 1906. He was ‘President of the Brisbane Chamber of Commerce for five terms (1898–1906), and was active in the Immigration League of Queensland, the Committee of Fire Underwriters, the Marine Board, the Brisbane and South Brisbane fire brigades, the General Hospital, the Technical College, and the State committee for the selection of Rhodes Scholars’.

Carter was a foundation member of the Johnsonian Club, a member of the Queensland Club and an active Freemason. He frequently wrote to the press on issues including defense, port facilities and bimetallism and was described as an effective lobbyist’. Contemporary accounts described him as ‘portly, urbane and genial, a kindly employer, popular and respected’, and noted his prominence within Brisbane's commercial community.

== Politics ==
Carter was a ‘liberal, a Free Trader and one of the few ardent Federationists in Brisbane commerce’. As a leader of the Federation League he visited Sydney for the June 1899 referendum and represented Queensland at the free-trade conference that was held there in February 1900. Carter was subsequently appointed to the Queensland Legislative Council in July 1901 where he spoke rarely but attended regularly.

When the T. J. Ryan government in 1915 proposed amendment of the Workers' Compensation Act to give the State Government Insurance Office a monopoly, ‘Carter was a leading opponent on behalf of private insurance interests’. The council amended the bill to remove the monopoly but ‘Carter's failure to secure a consequential amendment negated the victory’. Following that defeat, Carter only spoke once more in the council, on an insurance bill in December 1916.

== Honours ==
Carter was made an officer of the Académie française in 1911 and in 1912 received the Norwegian Order of St Olav.

== Family life ==
Carter married Jane Nodes in London in February 1867. She died in May 1871, leaving him with three young sons; on 9 November 1872 he married a widow Frances Eliza Elgin Koch (née Johnson).

Carter died on 4 November 1917 at his home at Kangaroo Point and was buried in South Brisbane Cemetery. He was survived by his wife and their five children, and by one son of his first marriage. He is commemorated by a plaque in St Mary's Anglican Church, Kangaroo Point, where he was a churchwarden.
