= Timothy Joseph O'Shea =

The Honourable Timothy O'Shea
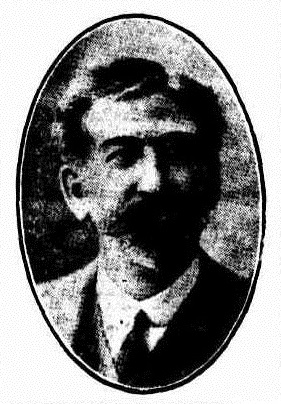

Member of the Queensland Legislative Council
- In office 3 July 1914 – 23 March 1922

Personal details
- Born: Timothy Joseph O'Shea; 15 March 1860 Ballyduff, County Kerry, Ireland
- Died: 7 October 1930 (aged 70) Brisbane, Queensland, Australia
- Resting place: Toowong Cemetery
- Occupation: Solicitor, company director

Timothy Joseph O'Shea (15 March 1860 – 7 October 1930) was a solicitor, and member of the Queensland Legislative Council.

== Early life ==
O'Shea was born in March 1860 at Ballyduff, County Kerry, Ireland, to Timothy O'Shea, and his wife Ellen (née O'Sullivan). He came to Australia with his family at age five and attended the local state school. Admitted as a solicitor in 1885, he was a senior partner in the law firm, O'Shea, O'Shea, Corser and Wadley.

== Political career ==
O'Shea was appointed by the Denham ministry to the Legislative Council on 3 July 1914. He served for the next eight years until the council was abolished on 23 March 1922.

== Personal life ==
O'Shea was a director of several companies including Queensland Brewery Ltd, Queensland Finance and Investment Company, Moreton Sugar Mills, and the Ipswich Electricity Supply Company. He was interested in horses, cattle, and motoring. He was especially keen on horse racing and at one stage owned two racehorses.

He was also a member of Brisbane's Johnsonian Club and president of the Christian Brothers' Old Boys' Association.

A lifelong bachelor, O'Shea died in October 1930. His funeral was held at St. Ignatius Catholic Church, Toowong, and proceeded to the Toowong Cemetery.
