= Hamilton Goold-Adams =

Irish soldier and colonial administrator (1858–1920)

Sir Hamilton Goold-Adams GCMG, CB
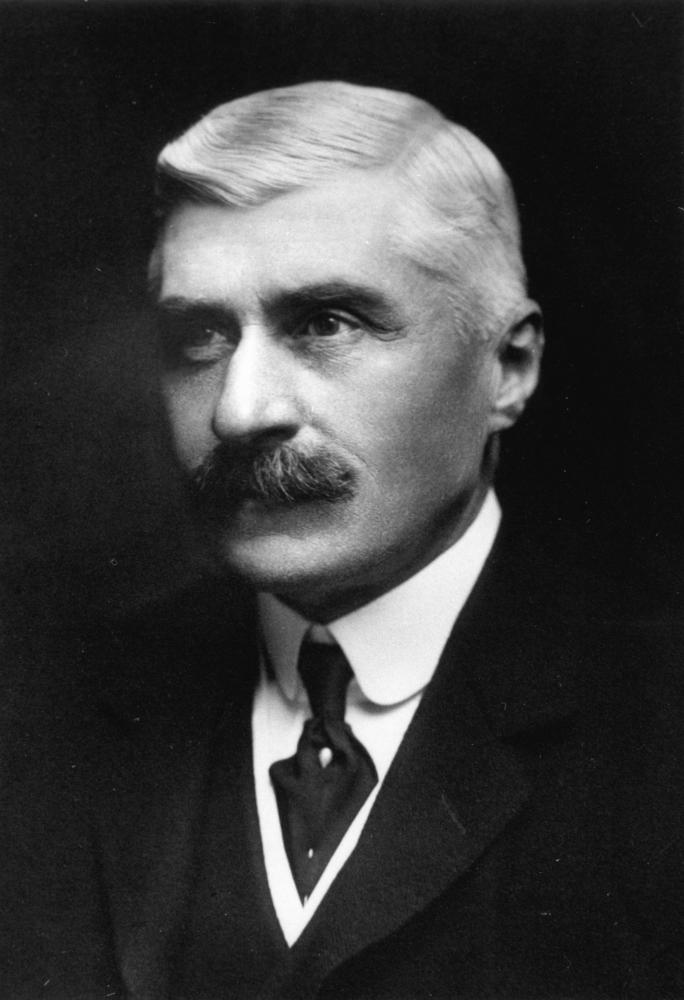

12th Governor of Queensland
- In office 15 March 1915 – 3 February 1920
- Monarch: George V
- Premier: Digby Denham; T. J. Ryan; Ted Theodore
- Preceded by: Sir William MacGregor
- Succeeded by: Sir Matthew Nathan

Personal details
- Born: 27 June 1858 Jamesbrook, County Cork, Ireland
- Died: 12 April 1920 (aged 61) Cape Town, Cape Province, Union of South Africa
- Spouse: Elsie Goold-Adams née Riordon
- Children: Richard John Moreton Goold-Adams; Elizabeth Mary Goold-Adams

Military service
- Allegiance: United Kingdom
- Branch/service: British Army
- Rank: Major
- Battles/wars: Second Boer War
- Awards: Knight Grand Cross of the Order of St Michael and St George; Companion of the Order of the Bath; Mentioned in Despatches

Sir Hamilton John Goold-Adams, GCMG, CB (27 June 1858 – 12 April 1920) was an Irish soldier and colonial administrator, who served as Governor of Queensland from 1915 to 1920. He was married to Elsie Goold-Adams.

== Early life ==
Born in the townland of Jamesbrook in County Cork, Ireland, fourth son of Richard Wallis Goold-Adams (1802–73) and Mary Sarah Goold-Adams (d. 1899), daughter of Elizabeth O'Neill and Sir William Wrixon-Becher, 1st Baronet.

== Military career ==
Hamilton Goold-Adams was a cadet in the training ship HMS Conway until he decided to join the British Army and was commissioned in the Royal Scots Regiment, serving principally in southern Africa, where he achieved the rank of captain in 1885 and major in 1895, leading many expeditions into the interior. During the Second Boer War he served first as Resident Commissioner in Bechuanaland, Afterwards as commander of the Town Guard during the latter half of the Siege of Mafeking where he was twice Mentioned in Despatches.

== Colonial administrator and governor ==
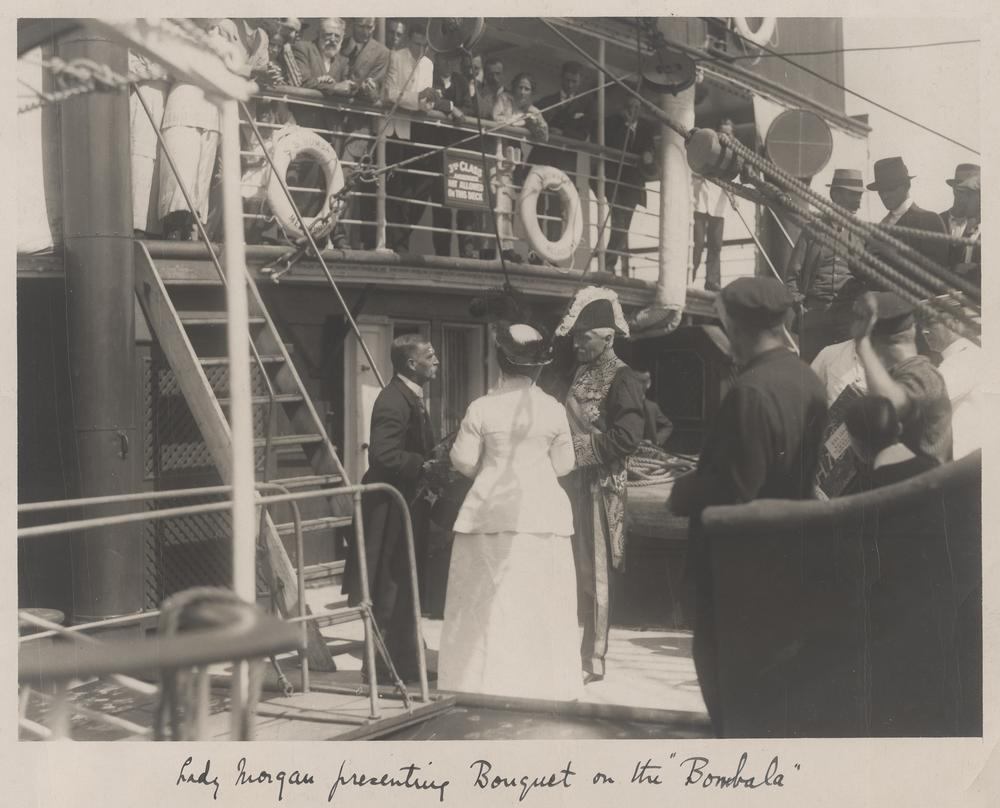
Lady Morgan, accompanied by Governor Sir Hamilton John Goold-Adams, presenting a bouquet on the Bombala, Brisbane, 1915

Goold-Adams was appointed Deputy Commissioner of the Orange River Colony under the Administrator Sir Alfred Milner (later Lord Milner) in January 1901. Following the end of hostilities in May 1902, the colony formally received a new constitution on 23 June, and Goold-Adams was appointed as Lieutenant-Governor, serving as such until 1907, when he became governor.

Goold-Adams was made a Companion of the Order of St Michael and St George in 1902, and was advanced to Knight Grand Cross of the Order of St Michael and St George in 1907.

Goold-Adams returned to England in 1911, where he married a Canadian named Elsie Riordon on 4 July. Later that year he was appointed British High Commissioner to Cyprus. In 1914, he was made Governor of Queensland, and arrived in Brisbane just before the election of Queensland's first majority Labor government, under Premier T. J. Ryan. He occasionally disapproved of Labor's policies and majority appointments to the Legislative Council of Queensland.

Returning to England after his retirement, Goold-Adams contracted pleurisy on board ship, and died in Cape Town, Union of South Africa in 1920.

== Personal life ==
Upon his return from South Africa on 4 July 1911, he married Elsie Riordan of Montreal, Canada; they had two children.

Government offices
Preceded by William Palmer, 2nd Earl of Selborne	Governor of the Orange River Colony; 1907–1910	Succeeded by Office abolished
Preceded by Sir William MacGregor	Governor of Queensland; 1915–1920	Succeeded by Sir Matthew Nathan
