= Ambulance Building, Charters Towers =

Ambulance Building
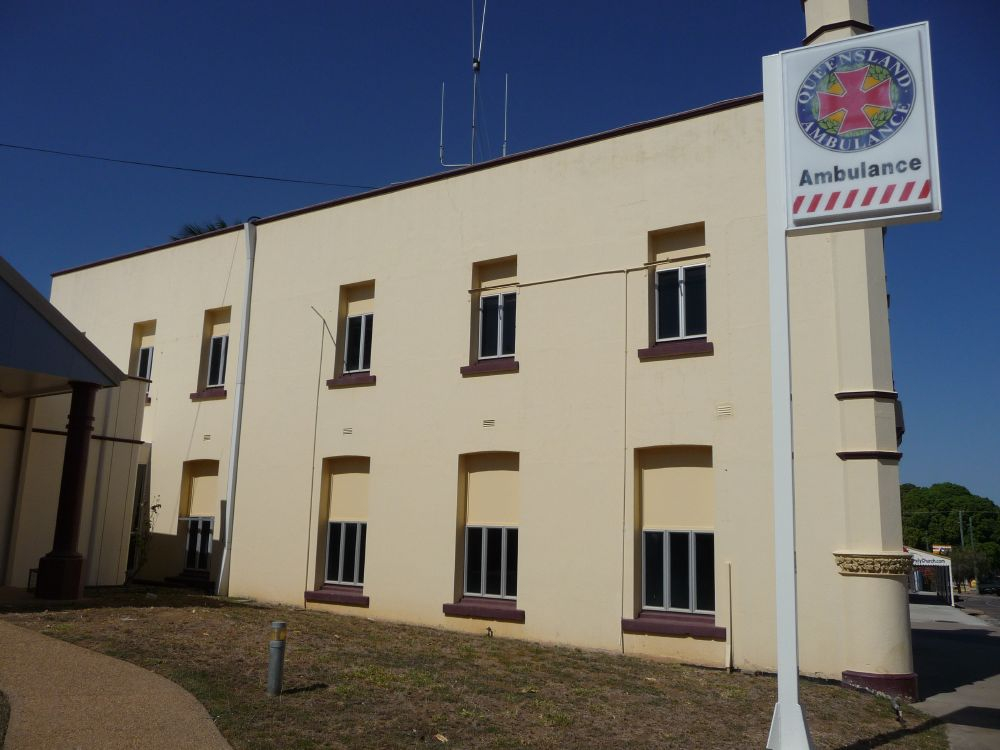
- Ambulance Building, Charters Towers, 2015

- Location within Queensland
- 20.0767°S 146.2663°E
- Location: 157 Gill Street, Charters Towers City, Charters Towers, Charters Towers Region, Queensland, Australia

History
- Design period: 1900–1914 (Early 20th century)
- Built: 1903

Site notes
- Architect: Walter Hunt
- Architectural style: Classicism

Queensland Heritage Register
- Official name: Ambulance Building (former)
- Type: state heritage
- Designated: 4 December 2015
- Reference no.: 650009
- Type: Health and care services: Ambulance station
- Theme: Providing health and welfare services: Providing health services
- Builders: Arthur Reid & James Walker

Ambulance Building is a heritage-listed former ambulance station and now museum at 157 Gill Street, Charters Towers City, Charters Towers, Charters Towers Region, Queensland, Australia. It was designed by Walter Hunt and built in 1903 by Arthur Reid and James Walker. It is also known as Ambulance Building (former). It was added to the Queensland Heritage Register on 4 December 2015.

== History ==
The former Ambulance Building (1903) is the first QATB branded building in Queensland (CATB 1892–1901, QATB 1902–1991) is a two-storey masonry structure, located in the former mining town of Charters Towers. As the second purpose-built, and oldest surviving ambulance building in Queensland, it is important in demonstrating the establishment of ambulance services in regional centres throughout the state in the early 20th century. It is an excellent example of an early 20th century ambulance building, makes a strong aesthetic contribution to the townscape, and has a special association with the Queensland Ambulance Service (formerly QATB).

Charters Towers was established after gold was discovered at the foot of Towers Hill in December 1871, leading to the proclamation of the Charters Towers Goldfield on 31 August 1872.

The settlement began with a number of shops and hotels along a track, which became Mosman Street, with the population reputedly 3000 by August 1872. In 1877 the 1 square mile (2.6 km^{2}) comprising Charters Towers, centred on Mosman Street, was declared a municipality (the Borough of Charters Towers).

In the 1880s Charters Towers continued to prosper and grow, becoming the most productive goldfield in Queensland. The completion of the Great Northern railway line from Townsville to Charters Towers in December 1882 boosted the town's prosperity, by lowering the cost of supplies and building materials. An influx of capital from English speculators from 1886 funded further mining. In 1889 the famous Brilliant Reef, the richest on the field, was discovered, boosting the goldfield's fortunes.

Charters Towers consistently out-produced all other Queensland goldfields between 1880 and 1913, apart from a brief spike in production at Mount Morgan in 1888–1889, coinciding with a brief economic downturn at Charters Towers due to drought reducing the water supply for crushing machines. According to Government Geologist Robert Logan Jack, Charters Towers was the third largest gold producing area in Australia, after Ballarat and Sandhurst (Bendigo). From 1883 to c. 1909 gold was Queensland's second largest or largest export by value.

At the turn of the century, Charters Towers had just achieved peak production (1899), comprised a multi-cultural population of around 26,500, was Queensland's second largest city, and was known colloquially as "the World".

During the field's period of high production, its mines were dangerous places to work. Death and injury figures between 1890 and 1901 for Charters Towers "were consistently higher, in proportion to the number of miners employed, than for the colony in general".

The whole community was affected by accidents, poor mine sanitation (resulting in typhoid and other enteric disease) and "miners lung". The causes were poor health and safety due to inappropriate managerial practices, and the field's geology. In addition, there were the usual injuries such as fractures, contusions, gunshot wounds, cuts, burns, bites and drownings.

An ambulance service for Charters Towers was proposed in 1900, as an initiative of the City Ambulance Transport Brigade (CATB), which had operated in Brisbane from 1892, due to concerns about the lack of adequate medical aid for accident victims. Prior to its establishment, the sick and injured were required to make their own way to medical services, at times, worsening injuries. The objective of the brigade was to provide first aid and to transport sick and injured people to hospital.

Elsewhere in the world, ambulance services had commenced earlier. In the United States of America, the Commercial Hospital in Cincinnati started the first public, hospital-based ambulance service before 1865. Britain's first hospital-based ambulance, for transportation of fever and smallpox patients in London, commenced in 1867. The Red Cross formed in Europe in 1870 and St John's Ambulance Association commenced in England in 1877. Wheeled litters were used in London from 1880 with police taking responsibility for transportation of the injured. In Australia, Sydney's Board of Health formed the first recorded ambulance corps in 1881, for transportation of patients with suspected infectious diseases to the Coast Hospital. Thereafter, other Sydney hospitals replicated this service.

In 1900 the CATB instructed Superintendent R Nye Stevens to report on extending an ambulance service to the Colony's larger towns and cities. He visited Townsville and Charters Towers to discuss the establishment of ambulance services. A public meeting, organised by Mayor John Asher Benjamin, for those interested in the commencement of an ambulance and transport brigade in Charters Towers, was held on 12 October 1900. Superintendent Stevens informed the meeting that an Ambulance Brigade Centre in Charters Towers would require at least two paid officers, who would be paid £3 per week, while 20–30 honorary staff would be required (at a cost of £6 per head for uniform, badge etc.). The necessary equipment would be three improved Ashford Litters, and associated gear. The headquarters for Charters Towers could be anywhere in the centre of town. The management costs would be met by the public, aided by government subsidy and the first year's expenditure could be covered by £200 from locally-raised subscriptions plus the government subsidy. As a result of this meeting, a local committee was formed to establish the Charters Towers Ambulance Brigade.

The Charters Towers Ambulance Brigade, operational in December 1900 was the first regional centre opened in Queensland. It operated from the fire station in Bow Street under the superintendence of TW Treacy of the CATB. Later the centre moved to a six-roomed house on the corner of Deane and Ann Streets, with its stable and plant room located on an adjoining allotment.

In 1902, the CATB was renamed the Queensland Ambulance Transport Brigade (QATB), to reflect the expansion of its operations in regional centres throughout Queensland. Ambulance brigades were established in Charters Towers and Townsville (1900); Rockhampton, Warwick and Ipswich (1901); Toowoomba (1902); Ravenswood and Mackay (1903); Cairns (1904) and Bundaberg (1907). While most ambulance services were affiliated with the QATB, others such as Gympie (1902) were established independently. The goldfields of Charters Towers, Ravenswood and Gympie, with large working populations of miners, were among the first to establish ambulance services in the state.

Recognition of the need for a permanent centre in Charters Towers, and action to achieve it, soon followed. As early as December 1901, the Charters Towers Ambulance Brigade Committee discussed the need for a permanent centre. It wished to purchase land and erect its own premises at the cost of about £1200 and the Chair, JA Benjamin, thought it should be located near the suburb of Queenton, to the east of the city centre.

An advertisement requesting details of land for sale in Charters Towers, in a central position and suitable for building the new ambulance brigade quarters, was placed in The Northern Miner in July 1902 by TW Treacy, Superintendent. Subsequently, land was purchased in Gill Street, Queenton, just beyond Boundary Street, for £625 from Joseph Hopper. On the site was a seven-room house and store. The property was located between the city centre and the railway station, and close to the hospital (one block to the west on Gill Street) and to the principal mines of the goldfield (the Brilliant and Queen reefs to the east); therefore, near transport, medical facilities and potential patients.

Fundraising for the Ambulance Brigade Fund was necessary, but attracted criticism. The North Queensland Register newspaper criticised the Charters Towers Ambulance Brigade for spending too much on its new premises, claiming the two-storey masonry building would be costly and take money from hospital fundraising. There was also resistance to the ambulance service from the hospital, which believed that ambulance subscriptions disadvantaged its own fundraising activity. Nevertheless, fundraising continued, with an ambulance sports day attended by the Governor, Sir Herbert Chermside, and musical performances at Charters Towers' Theatre Royal.

Local architect Walter Hunt was appointed to design the building. Arthur Reid was contracted for its construction and James Walker carried out the brickwork for Reid, under Hunt's supervision. Walter Hunt was born in Kiama, New South Wales (NSW) in 1870 and trained in NSW. From 1902 he was a Fellow of the Institute of Architects New South Wales and from 1912 a Fellow of the Queensland Institute of Architects. He practised as an architect in Charters Towers from 1899–1910. During that time, as well as the Ambulance Building, he designed the Charters Towers Swimming Baths (1900); the Commonwealth Fountain in Lissner Park (1900); the 1901 extension to the ED Miles Mining Exchange; cottages; villa residences; and The Northern Miner Newspaper Building (1903). In 1911 Hunt formed a partnership with Charles Dalton Lynch - CD Lynch and Walter Hunt, Architects, Northern Queensland - located in Townsville. During that partnership the firm undertook diverse projects. Hunt practised as an architect and surveyor in Townsville from 1921 to 1931 and from 1923 taught architecture at Townsville Technical College. With his son, Maurice, Hunt operated Maurice and Walter Hunt, Architects, Townsville from 1931 until he retired to Sydney in 1932.

On 29 March 1903, 1500 people witnessed Charters Towers Ambulance Brigade Committee member, Percy James Allen, lay the marble foundation stone of the Ambulance Building, the second purpose-built ambulance centre in the state. Less than three months later, on 13 June 1903, the building was officially opened by JA Benjamin, Chair of the Charters Towers Ambulance Brigade Committee. The property, building and fixtures had cost £2600, of which, £1000 had already been repaid.

The building was described by the Charters Towers Mining Standard newspaper at this time:

The ground floor being paved with concrete blocks ... consists of a large room where the sulky and stretchers are kept, the harness being suspended over the shafts of the sulky ready to drop on the horse at any time... Wunderlick [sic] ceiling has been used on the ground floor...

The front and stable doors opened by electricity, so that when the alarm bell is rung - and the horse is trained sufficiently - the doors will open and the horse will walk into position ready for the men to come sliding down the pole from the upper storey.

[Upstairs] is the large boardroom, two lavatories and bathrooms and six bedrooms for the staff.

At the Ambulance Brigade's Annual Meeting in January 1904, the Committee's purpose in erecting such a building was given:

The building is of brick and most substantially erected, consequently the cost of repairs will be practically nil and should meet the requirements of this district for all time.

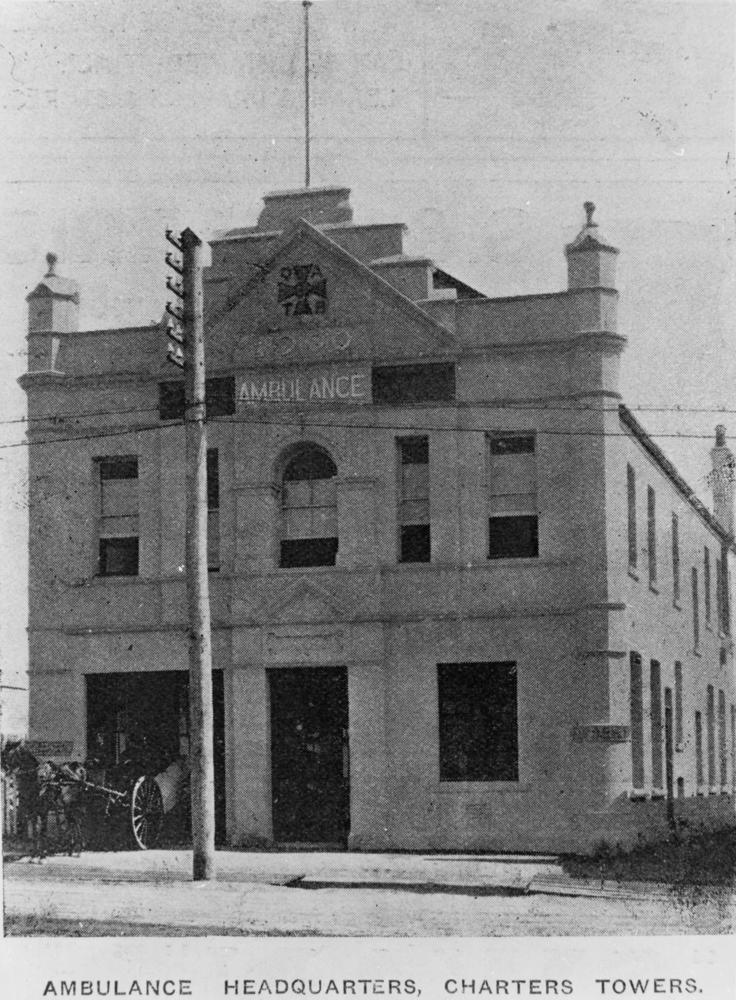
1905 photograph

A 1905 photograph shows the building as a two storeyed, rendered structure with a symmetrical front elevation that featured an eclectic mix of classical motifs, such as pediments with entablature, pilasters, an aedicule, arched openings and rendered ornamentation of acanthus and ivy leaves. The exception to the elevation's symmetry was a large opening at the western end of the ground floor which allowed for horse-drawn vehicle access. The logo of the QATB (a Maltese cross encircled by the letters Q, A, T and B), the date "1900" and the word "AMBULANCE" were also incorporated into the elevation's ornamentation, and a stepped parapet concealed the roof structure from the street. Moulded horizontal bands spanned across the elevation and each level of the stepped parapet. The building was erected close to the western boundary of the allotment, leaving space to the east of the building for access to the rear of the block.

The superintendent resided in a timber house to the rear of the ambulance station, on the same allotment.

Although the Charters Towers Mining Standard concluded that the building "really represents a Sydney fire station, adapted to the use of the ambulance brigade", the layout of the Ambulance Building mimics that used in the Wharf Street headquarters of the CATB in Brisbane in 1897 (since demolished), which established a precedent for subsequent ambulance station designs as the service expanded throughout Queensland. The Wharf Street building comprised two storeys with plant and staff facilities on the ground level and accommodation on the first floor. Large ground floor openings allowed ready access directly to the street for horse and sulky to quickly exit the building.

The first year of operation was busy for the Charters Towers Ambulance Centre. In 1901 it attended 1165 cases: 388 attended outside, 175 transported to hospital and 602 transported to the ambulance centre, showing that the organisation and its service had been very much needed.

Production at all Queensland gold mining centres declined in the early 20th century. Charters Towers experienced a rapid downturn in mining from 1914, leading to its cessation in 1917. Consequently, the city's population decreased steadily to 13,000 by the end of World War I, and more than 900 homes and business premises were removed between 1914 and 1918. However, Charters Towers remained a regional centre providing services to its surrounding community; one of which was the ambulance service.

Despite the decline in the town with mining, the ambulance brigade's work did not lessen, as the use of motor vehicles extended its area of service into outlying rural areas. In 1915, the Charters Towers Ambulance Brigade "installed a new motor car for bush work", and in 1918 the QATB converted from horse-drawn vehicles to motorised ambulances. This greatly increased, by number of cases and distance travelled, the Charters Towers Ambulance Brigade's work as it increasingly assisted the community beyond Charters Towers.

A number of changes to the Ambulance Building were made over time; primarily for operational purposes. In 1916 a Wunderlich ceiling was added to the first floor of the ambulance station by contractor Ben Toll. In 1946 the top floor of the building was converted into a residence for the Superintendent and the former detached residence sold for £200 for removal. This change "cut down maintenance costs" and converted the Ambulance Building to the standard layout for ambulance buildings which the QATB had developed by 1921. This included a space for vehicles with easy street access, a casualty room, a meeting room and a sleeping room for ambulance bearers on the ground floor and residential quarters for the superintendent above. In the following year, one of the doors to the plant room was sheeted over; there was "installation of [a] septic system, bathroom and laundry for use of the bearers; levelling of the old workshop floor; and the erection of a partition between that workshop and Plant room which became a much need room for the bearers use".

Further operational changes took place in the ensuing years. Sometime after 1956, the timber-doored opening to the plant room from Gill Street, which was designed for horse-drawn vehicle access, was widened to accommodate motor vehicles, but its height lowered and a cantilevered awning added. Air-conditioning was installed prior to 1994, using modern single air-conditioning units fitted within windows on both floors, primarily on the eastern side of the building, but has since been removed.

Expansion of the Charters Towers facilities was planned when the QATB purchased additional land adjacent to the existing site. In 1983 a block of land to the west of the Ambulance Building was purchased and two more blocks were purchased, again to the west, in 1988.

In 1995 there were major changes to the Charters Towers ambulance service when a new lowset ambulance building was added, to the west of the original building, on land purchased during the 1980s. Alterations made to the former Ambulance Building at that time probably included the covered passage on its western side, from the "rec room" (former workshop) to the new ambulance station building.

In April 2003 in preparation for the re-purposing of the Ambulance Building to a museum display, the awning over the plant room's vehicular entrance was removed and the Gill Street elevation rebuilt to its 1903 specifications, including the re-creation of the middle doorway, but with the vehicular entrance lower than its original height.

In 2015 the Ambulance Building, Charters Towers retains a strong presence in the streetscape of Gill Street, the principal street of the city. The building houses a museum display including a collection of vehicles, uniforms, ambulance paraphernalia and log books recording cases treated by ambulance officers. Some of these are objects associated with the Charters Towers QATB, while others have been donated from elsewhere.

== Description ==
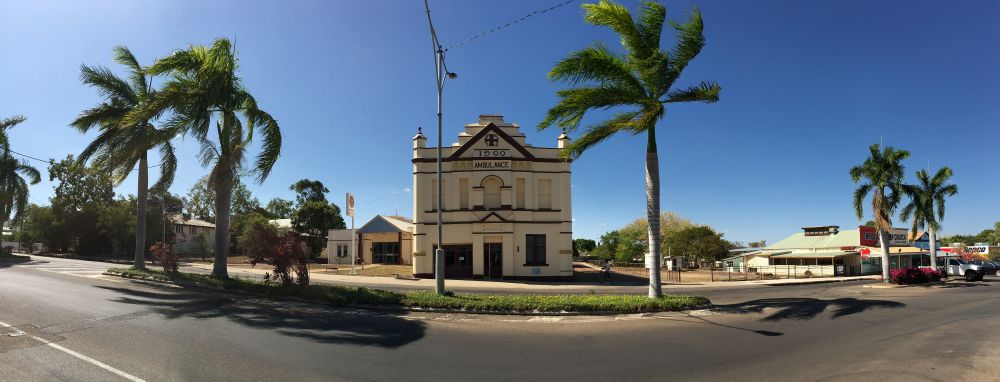
Panorama of the Ambulance Building and surrounds, 2015

The former Ambulance Building occupies the southwest corner of a level, 0.158 hectares (0.39 acres), rectangular allotment, approximately 1 kilometre (0.62 mi) east of the central business district in Charters Towers, North Queensland. The site is bounded to the south by the major thoroughfare of Gill Street, to the west by a lowset modern ambulance facility (setback from Gill Street), to the north by residential properties, and to the east by a vacant lot. The Ambulance Building (1903) is positioned at the front (southern end) of the allotment, facing Gill Street, and is an eye-catching feature in the townscape. An access driveway runs along the eastern boundary.

=== Ambulance Building (1903) ===
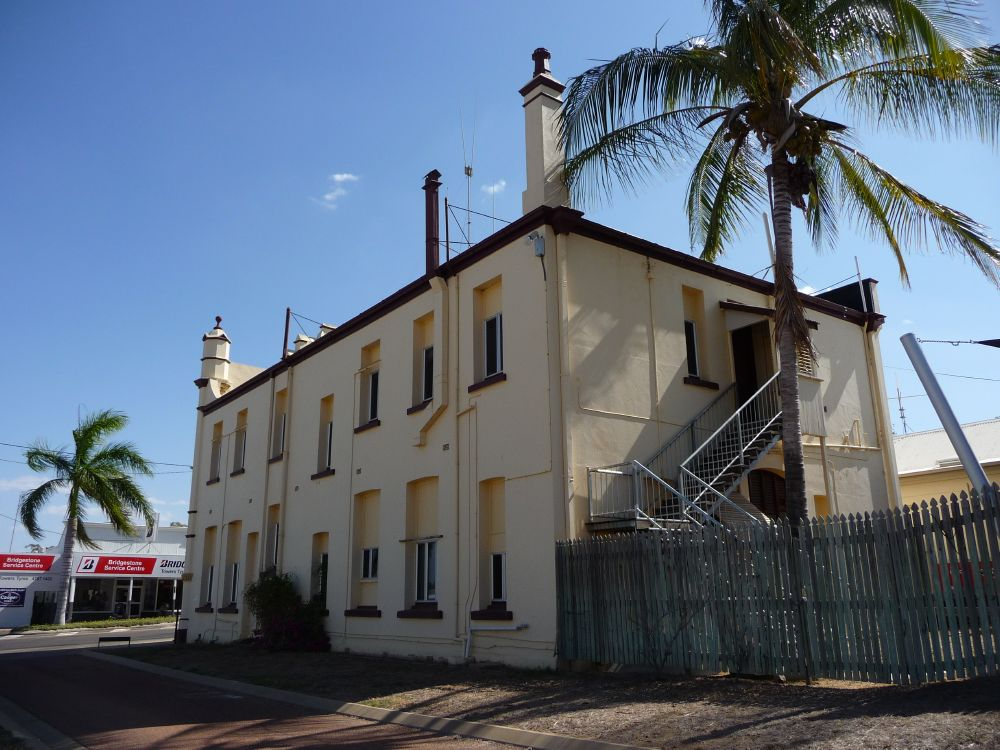
Side and rear view, 2015

The Ambulance Building is a two storey, rendered brick structure, designed in a classical idiom, and sheltered by a corrugated metal-clad gable roof that is hipped at the rear. The building is approximately rectangular in plan, with its front elevation angled to align with Gill Street and its long axis running north-south. The building's roof has circular metal vents along its ridgeline and a tall, rendered brick chimney protrudes from the northeastern corner. The building has pedestrian and vehicular access from Gill Street, with additional pedestrian entrances on the north and west sides. Various items relating to Queensland's ambulance history are retained in a museum display within the building.

The front elevation is symmetrical around a central pediment, arched window and front entry aedicule. A stepped parapet concealing the roof is terminated at each end by octagonal pilasters, projecting prominently above the roofline and topped with domed caps and ball finials. Other applied ornamentation to the front elevation includes: the former logo of the Queensland Ambulance Transport Brigade (QATB) (a Maltese cross encircled by the letters Q, A, T and B) and the date "1900" in raised letters within the pediment; acanthus leaf motifs and the word "AMBULANCE" raised within the entablature; fluted arch spandrels; ivy leaf motifs; and moulded horizontal bands. A foundation stone, set within the wall at the eastern end of the elevation, commemorates the foundation date of the building, 29 March 1903, and the name of the person who laid the stone, PJ Allen.

In plan, the former ambulance service facility rooms are housed on the ground floor, and the former living quarters occupy the first floor. The ground floor is divided into two sections: front and rear. The front section comprises a large plant room, with servicing rooms along the eastern side, including (running south to north): a former casualty room, a former radio room and, underneath the timber stair, a former kit room. The stair features an early metal handrail, and memorial plaques dating back to at least 1934. The kit room houses built-in, timber-framed bunk beds and timber lockers. A corridor, beginning at the plant room and terminating at a rear entrance door, divides the rear section - to the west is a recreation (rec) room (former workshop), with a northern store room, toilet and bathroom; and to the east is a laundry and kitchen. The first floor contains a large boardroom in the southwestern corner, with two bedrooms flanking the eastern side. North of the boardroom, a hallway runs north through the centre of the building. Three bedrooms and a northern bathroom are west of the corridor, and a southern bedroom, stairwell, former kitchen and northern former laundry are to the east.

Early timber joinery is retained. Most windows have deep reveals and wide sills. The front elevation contains a tall, timber-framed casement window (ground floor) and double-hung windows with timber sashes (first floor). The window in the centre of the first floor is arched. On the ground floor, the central entrance door and wide, vehicular access door are recent reconstructions - render and brick arches above these doors indicate their lowered height. The openings on the side and rear elevations remain in their early locations, with the ground and first floor openings generally aligned. Doors to the northern elevation are ledged and boarded with v-jointed (VJ) timber. A doorway on the eastern elevation and an archway in the northern elevation are now enclosed. Aligned with the northern archway, a large, internal arched opening is set within a wall separating the front and rear of the ground floor. Most interior doors are panelled timber and those at the southern end of the ground floor have decorative timber fanlights.

Most early interior linings are intact. The brickwork of the exterior walls is painted internally. Partition walls are generally single-skin, timber-framed and lined with wide, horizontal, VJ timber boards. Those at the rear of the ground floor are lined with flat sheeting (some with cover strips), indicating their later installation. Notches within partitions in the boardroom are evidence of the location of early picture rails. Large concrete pavers line the floor of the plant room, which slopes from the north down to the south. The floors of the first level are lined with timber boards; and a mark within the floor lining of the boardroom is indicative of the location of a later partition (now removed). Pressed metal ceilings of various patterns are featured throughout the building - those at the front end of the ground floor and in the first floor boardroom are of a more decorative style. The first floor features a range of decorative ceiling roses. A section of narrow floor boards at the southern end of the first floor corridor, and a circular hole within the ceiling lining, denote the former location of a pole which accessed the ground floor. The underside of this floor lining is visible within a recessed section of the ground floor ceiling. A hole in the ceiling lining of the laundry is indicative of a chimney connection's location. Cornices and architraves are timber of a detailed profile.

Recent elements that are not of cultural heritage significance include: the carpet, tile and linoleum floor linings; kitchen and bathroom fit-outs; external, northern stairs; aluminium-framed windows; sheeting enclosing openings; the door connecting to adjacent, modern ambulance facilities; reconstructed doors within the front elevation; paint covering window panes; and light fittings.

=== Landscape Elements ===
A driveway remains in its original (c. 1903) location along the eastern edge of the site and allows access to the rear of the Ambulance Building. It has a recent surface.

=== Other Structures/Elements ===
Other structures, sheds, footpaths, walkways and roads within the cultural heritage boundary are not of cultural heritage significance.

== Heritage listing ==
Ambulance Building was listed on the Queensland Heritage Register on 4 December 2015 having satisfied the following criteria.

The place is important in demonstrating the evolution or pattern of Queensland's history.

The former Ambulance Building in Charters Towers (1903) is important in demonstrating the development of civic ambulance services in regional Queensland centres, a pattern of development commencing in the first decade of the 1900s and continuing during the 20th century. It is the earliest known surviving, purpose-built ambulance building in Queensland.

Built during the peak period of gold mining in Charters Towers, the most productive and dangerous goldfield in Queensland in the late 19th and early 20th centuries, the Ambulance Building, Charters Towers, is important in demonstrating the early role of gold mining towns in developing ambulance services in Queensland.

The place is important in demonstrating the principal characteristics of a particular class of cultural places.

The former Ambulance Building is important in demonstrating the evolution of the principal characteristics of purpose-built ambulance stations during the 20th century. The building is a two-storey structure, incorporating ambulance service facilities at ground level with ready-access to the street; and living quarters (and boardroom) at the first level. It is positioned in a central location, in close proximity to a hospital, transport and its patients. The earliest surviving ambulance building in Queensland it is substantially intact and has a high degree of integrity.

Alterations undertaken during the building's use as an ambulance building (1903–95), including widening of access doors and alterations to the ground floor for motorised vehicles, provide important evidence of the evolution of Queensland ambulance services – illustrating the transition from hand litter and horse-drawn to motorised transport, and growth in demand for the service.

The place is important because of its aesthetic significance.

The former Ambulance Building, through its substantial form and eclectic design, is important for its contribution to the Charters Towers townscape. The building is an eye-catching feature at the eastern entrance to Charters Towers' central business district; and its substantial massing and detailed ornamentation express the importance of ambulance services to early mining areas.

The place has a special association with the life or work of a particular person, group or organisation of importance in Queensland's history.

The former Ambulance Building is important for its association, since 1903, with the Queensland Ambulance Service (formerly the Queensland Ambulance Transport Brigade and initially the City Ambulance Transport Brigade), an organisation of enormous importance to Queensland in providing ambulance services throughout the state since 1900.
