= ED Miles Mining Exchange =

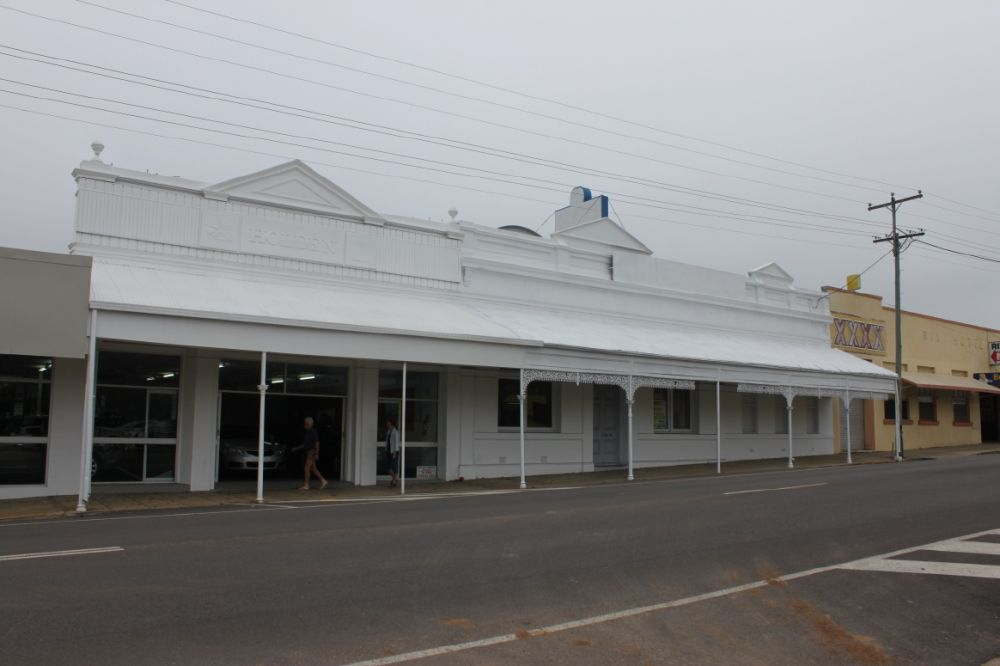
- ED Miles Mining Exchange, 2012

- Location within Queensland Location within Australia
- 20.0748°S 146.2578°E
- Location: 65 Mosman Street, Charters Towers City, Charters Towers, Charters Towers Region, Queensland, Australia

History
- Design period: 1870s–1890s (late 19th century)
- Built: 1887

Site notes
- Architect: William George Smith junior

Queensland Heritage Register
- Official name: ED Miles Mining Exchange (former)
- Type: state heritage
- Designated: 9 November 2012
- Reference no.: 602801
- Builders: Ben Toll

ED Miles Mining Exchange is a heritage-listed commercial building at 65 Mosman Street, Charters Towers City, Charters Towers, Charters Towers Region, Queensland, Australia. It was designed by William George Smith junior, and built in 1887 by Ben Toll. It was added to the Queensland Heritage Register on 9 November 2012.

== History ==
The former ED Miles Mining Exchange in Charters Towers was built in 1887 and extended in 1889, 1891 and 1901, to house the business established by Edward David Miles in 1883, and managed in partnership with Joe Millican from 1887. This was the first of a number of long standing mining exchange businesses established during the 1880s in Charters Towers, and thought to be the most successful business of this type in Queensland, operating from 1883 until it was liquidated shortly after the death of Miles in 1922.

The Charters Towers gold deposits were first discovered in December 1871, by an Aboriginal boy named Jupiter who accompanied prospectors Hugh Mosman and Adam Mosman and John Fraser, who were later joined by George Clarke. Jupiter found a rich vein of gold laden quartz. Mosman travelled to Ravenswood in early January 1872 to register the claim which he named Charters Towers, honouring the Gold Commissioner, William Charters. By March 1872 Commissioner Charters had issued 25 prospecting area permits in the vicinity of Mosman's claim and the rush began.

Two settlements were established, one which became Charters Towers and another four miles (6.4 km) distant which became Millchester. Charters Towers began with a number of stores, hotels and a butcher shop along a track that was to become Mosman Street, with the population reputedly 3000 by August 1872. There was rivalry between the two settlements, particularly after the courthouse was established at Millchester in 1873. However Charters Towers soon dominated. Its town survey was undertaken in November 1874 marking out allotments in a "T" formation, with the mines and the provision stores of Mosman Street on one axis, and the road to Millchester marked by Gill Street on the other. Charters Towers was declared a municipality in 1877 encompassing one square mile centred on Mosman Street. It included new churches, the Oddfellows and Good Templar Lodges, 21 hotels and 57 shops.

In the meantime, it had become evident the procurement of gold from the deep seams of Charter Towers required substantial machinery to crush quartz and sink shafts. This required working capital to find the gold, finance machinery and to pay the wages of workers employed on these time-consuming processes. The Queensland Gold Fields Act 1874 and Gold Mining Companies Act 1875 allowed for combinations of leases, claims and syndicates in order to work their leases at great depths. The legislation also underpinned the establishment of permanent settlement which would attract capital investment to the field. Early "no liability" companies were floated but were short-lived, known as "no reliability companies" by the banks which refused to finance them. Most mines were run by syndicates with financial backing by the town's businessmen. A number of share-brokers operated around town in the late 1870s, regularly advertising in The Northern Miner newspaper. Company shares were available to the general public, and this initiated the role of mining agent whose sole purpose was acting as secretary of these companies and dealing in their shares. From 1881 the Charters Towers Town Clerk Edward David Miles also filled the role of secretary for a number of these companies and by 1882 company mining became the norm in Charters Towers.

ED Miles, having first advertised his services in February 1882 became a full-time mining agent in February 1883 and established an office adjacent to the Miner's Arms Hotel in Mosman Street. A native of Wales, he came to Australia in 1862 attracted by the Victorian gold rush. He initially worked in Castlemaine and then moved to Ballarat. In 1875, he moved to Charters Towers and was employed as an engine driver, a miner and worked in the store of John McDonald. He was appointed town clerk in 1880. The first mining company he represented was the Day Dawn Prospecting Claim, one of the most successful in Charters Towers. Established in 1875 and floated as a limited liability company in October 1881 it later realised a record production of £1,000,000 worth of gold in 1898. In May 1883 ED Miles was reporting to The Queenslander newspaper on 15 companies in Charters Towers, listing himself as secretary to five of these.

Mining secretaries ensured the companies complied with the relevant legislation and regulation and kept board members informed of their legal responsibilities. They were the company's named representative on legal documents and it was their responsibility to ensure company directors operated within the law. It was also their responsibility to register and communicate with the shareholders to ensure dividends were paid and company records maintained, such as lists of directors and shareholders and annual accounts. In mining towns, mining exchanges dealt in mine shares, whereas stock exchanges dealt in a variety of enterprises. Nevertheless, to deal in a stock exchange one had to be a member and Miles, as well as operating his own mining exchange, was later a member of the Charters Towers Stock Exchange.

The growth of both Gympie's and Charters Towers' gold fields led to the establishment of brokerages in both towns and in Brisbane, dealing in mining shares. Mining exchanges had operated in Ballarat, Victoria since 1857. Like Charters Towers, Ballarat's success came through the formation of mining companies to finance the deep sinking of mines. The establishment of the first dedicated mining exchange building in Ballarat was initiated by the local Borough Council in 1864 in a renovated building. Even when a more substantial building was constructed in 1888 (VHR HO65), it was still located on land owned by the local council.

There were a number of early mining exchanges in Queensland, none of which were established by local councils. Former Ballarat businessman and publican, Henry Farley had a mining exchange and hotel in Gympie in 1868. He then established the Mining Exchange Hotel in Stanthorpe in 1872. Another exchange was reported in Gympie in 1872. By 1881 there were 112 mining companies operating in Gympie, and Crawford and Rohde operated an exchange here from 1882 to 1885. Crawford then built his own building in 1885 from which he operated as mining secretary and commission agent. Another building in Gympie, Smithfield Chambers housed mining secretaries from 1895 and later the Gympie Stock Exchange Club. Other mining exchanges were established elsewhere in Queensland including; Thorp in Ravenswood, Clifton & Cohen Croydon and Barker & Frew also in Croydon, all established in 1887. Thorp also operated in Charters Towers. His Ravenswood exchange burnt down in 1901 and he replaced the building in 1903, although he appears to have not operated a mining exchange from the new building (Thorps Building). Miles's 1883 business was initiated prior to more substantial operations, such as the Brisbane Evening Mining Exchange (March 1884); the Stock Exchange in Gympie (10 July 1884); and the Brisbane Stock Exchange (23 July 1884). An early attempt to establish a stock exchange in Charters Towers began operating in the billiard room of the Crown Hotel in July 1885, but was a relatively short lived operation. Business was booming in Charters Towers by 1886, when British speculative investment in mining shares increased following the Colonial and Indian Exhibition in London where gold and ore samples were exhibited.

Miles' mining exchange business is thought to be the first of this type outside of Gympie, operating until shortly after his death in 1922. In 1884, Miles employed Joe Millican as assistant secretary, who became a partner in 1887. The Northern Miner newspaper described Miles's business character as "honest...exhibiting perfect sobriety...patient and unwearied industry and attention to business down to the minutest details."

In February 1887 ED Miles released plans for his new office designed by local architect WG Smith Jnr. The report in The Northern Miner included the following description for the building to be located on a vacant allotment between the Imperial and Empire Hotels in Mosman Street:

The building will be 52 x 36 feet wide [15.8 m x 11 m], clear on the inside, and will be divided into six separate offices with a hallway six feet [1.8 m] wide hall running through; the verandahs at the back and front will be 10 feet (3.0 m)] wide with a bedroom on the back verandah for one of the clerks. At the left-hand side of the main entrance will be the public room 21 feet (6.4 m)] long whilst at the rear of this are two offices each 15 by 15 feet (4.6 by 4.6 metres)]. On the right hand side is another office 15 by 15 feet (4.6 by 4.6 metres)], and next to this is the board room 25 by 15 feet (7.6 by 4.6 metres)], and there is another 15 feet (4.6 m)] square room at the back of the board room. The walls will be 16 feet (4.9 m)] high and the front and the wall near the Imperial will be of brick, whilst the other two will be composed of wood. The front of the building will be something like Mr Hunter's Exchange, but a little higher, and the verandah roof, which has a nice ornamental edging, will come lower in order to protect the front of the building form the afternoons' sun. The offices can be entered either from Mosman or Bow streets.

The contractor was Ben Toll, and Smith supervised its construction. By mid July 1887 the company had relocated to its new premises.

A feature of the interior is the use of a ventilation system, likely to be a variation of the Tobin tube, developed in England in the 1870s and patented by Martin Tobin in 1873. Ventilation is achieved through the installation of horizontal tubes under the floor, connected to vertical tubes attached to the internal walls to a height of just over one metre, drawing fresh air into the room and circulating it. At the ED Miles Mining Exchange, the system was probably installed at construction. It complements the more traditional ventilation methods including ventilated ceiling roses, fanlights, operable high-level windows, and a large roof lantern with operable glazing that were included within the building.

The architectural firm WG Smith & Sons was established in Townsville in 1886 by William George Smith Jnr and Snr. Smith junior designed a number of buildings in Townsville and Charters Towers. These include the Band Pavilion in Lissner Park and the Masonic Lodge in Charters Towers, and Osler House and the Choral Society Buildings in Townsville. He also designed St Mary's Convent in Charters Towers for the Sisters of Mercy.

An economic downturn occurred in 1888 because of a decrease in overseas investment and a continuing drought which led to the closure of crushing machines due to lack of water. The slump was short lived because of the development of the Brilliant Reef. It had been financed by Richard Craven and GM Levers who had profited from the British investors of 1886 and they were able to manage the mine for themselves. In 1889 Brilliant Reef, mined to a depth of 3,000 feet (910 m), became the biggest producer in the field.

Charters Towers was at its economic peak in the late 19th century, and according to Government Geologist Robert Logan Jack, was the third largest gold producing area in Australia, after Ballarat and Sandhurst (Bendigo). Many new buildings were completed and other mining agencies established. The T-junction of Mosman and Gill Streets became the financial district of Charters Towers. For one block to the east, north, and south were eight banks, the post and telegraph office, two assayers' offices, and four solicitor's offices. Share-brokers occupied the Royal Arcade, and other offices were located in Mosman and Bow Streets. The Royal Arcade was built in 1888 and by 1890 the Stock Exchange operated from the building.

During the late 1880s to early 1890s three other mining agencies and exchanges built offices in town. Ernest Hunter bailed out the early stock exchange and established a mining exchange in Mosman Street in March 1886, before occupying his own purpose built office by December. In 1887 Hunter and Albert Harte formed a partnership while Harte then formed another with his former secretary Alan Bright. Both agencies were in Mosman Street. The Hunter and Harte partnership was dissolved early in 1891. Hunter relocated to Croydon and Harte to Brisbane. McCallum and Ineson began business as a general draper and milliner in 1885, turning to share-broking for mining companies in 1890. The company built offices in Bow Street in 1892, designed by W G Smith. The building was later occupied by the Commonwealth Bank. Alan B Bright built a new mining exchange in Mosman Street in 1896, designed by Charles William Smith. Bright died in 1903 but his business continued to operate into the mid-1950s.

ED Miles and Company were agents for the Brilliant Reef and the neighbouring shafts by 1891, including the St George, Brilliant Block, Brilliant Freeholds, Brilliant Central, Brilliant St Patrick and Queen. Of the 58 mining companies listed in the Northern Mining Register newspaper share list in March 1891, ED Miles and Co. managed 24. Alan Bright managed only nine companies and there were other small operators in town. By September 1891, Miles was secretary to 31 mining companies as well as being the office for three London based companies and local organisations such as the Charters Towers District Hospital and Cemetery Trust, with Miles secretary to both organisations. His partner Joe Millican was mayor at this time. ED Miles became mayor in 1897. At that time The Queenslander newspaper suggested that ED Miles and Co had, for some time, held the leading place among mining agents and brokers in the state.

The growth in business necessitated an expansion of ED Miles's premises. With responsibility for so many secretarial roles and agencies a strong room for the books and securities was necessary. In 1889, a detached fire-proof strong room was built designed by Tunbridge and Tunbridge. It was constructed with walls 2 ft (610 mm) thick with an arched roof of brick and a massive iron door. The strong room was later extended in reinforced concrete, although a date for this is yet to be found.

By 1891 the company had two partners and 17 employees, and was reputedly the largest business of its type in Queensland at the time. Extensions to accommodate its expansion were reported in the Northern Mining Register:

The offices which are of brick, lined with wood, and lofty to provide ventilation have a frontage of 40ft (sic) to Mosman-street by a depth of 80ft and recent additions include a room for the corresponding clerks, a room for the share-broking department and a private apartment for members of the staff. The front office is 15 by 40 ft (4.6 by 12.2 m)]. On the right hand side on entering, the end of the office is cut off by a counter over which all transactions took place. On the left hand side cash and calls are received. Though there is no very great attempt at ornamentation the office is fitted with very handsome cedar polished counters, and is at the same time commodious and comfortable. In this part of the building four clerks are engaged...A pair of polished cedar spring doors cut off the private offices from the one devoted to the public and open on a hall way, running the length of the building. On the left hand-side, after entering the hall, is the office of the chief clerk, Mr J Mortimer Hastings in which directors' meetings are held. Mr Hastings takes the directors' meetings and attends to the correspondence; on the right of the hall is the large board-room in which meetings of shareholders takes place and where in the daytime six clerks are engaged under the supervision of Mr JD Macfarlane, who attends to the Warden's Court business, advertising, the despatch of call and dividend notices, and the transaction of insurance and general business. Mr Miles and Mr Millican occupy comfortable offices at the rear of the chief clerk's and board-room respectively. Attached to the main building is the room occupied by the three correspondence clerks, two of whom are shorthand writers.

No architect has been identified in relation to this extension. A number of architects were practicing in Charters Towers at the time including Tunbridge and Tunbridge, WG Smith and WH Munro.

In 1899 Charters Towers was the second most economically important city in Queensland with a population of over 26,000 and an internationally noted goldfield. The gold yield for the state had risen dramatically following the development of the Brilliant Reef and in 1891 it rose from 123,000 to 218,000 ounces (3,500 to 6,200 kg). It reached its all time peak during 1899 of 319,572 ounces (9,059.7 kg) yielding over £2,000,000 by the end of the year. This boom also led to the establishment of the School of Mines which opened in March 1899. ED Miles, in his role as president of the Mining Institute, laid the foundation stone. The School of Mines was based on the model of the Mechanics Institutes in Ballarat and Otago in New Zealand, which taught the necessary skills to existing and potential mine employees.

By September 1901 yet another extension to the ED Miles & Company building was underway, designed by Walter Hunt. The building then extended the entire length (18 metres (59 ft)) of its street frontage on Mosman Street, abutting the Empire Hotel. Hunt had relocated to Queensland from Kiama in New South Wales in mid 1899, working in Charters Towers, and later established a practice in Townsville with CD Lynch and undertaking work throughout North Queensland.

Further impact on the processing of ore in Charters Towers came with the Federation drought (1895–1902). The Burdekin River dried up, leading townspeople to build a weir upstream of the Burdekin River Pumping Station, completed by the end of 1902. Miles was chairman of the water board. Despite these problems, the mining warden reported an increase in gold production at the end of 1902, largely due to the development of the Queen Cross Mine, for which ED Miles and Co. was secretary.

Miles was appointed to the Queensland Legislative Council in July 1902. From 1905 Miles's parliamentary work necessitated his relocation to Brisbane, initially living in Kinellan House in New Farm, then at Nyrambla in Ascot. Joe Millican carried on the business.

Despite Charters Towers being declared a city in 1909, the downturn in mining from 1914 and its cessation in 1917 contributed to a steady decrease in population during this time. A town that had boasted a population of 25,000 in 1900, when it was the second largest in Queensland, was reduced to just 13,000 by the end of World War I. Between 1914 and 1918 more than 900 homes and business premises were removed from Charters Towers. Many were dismantled and transported by train to Townsville or Ayr where they were re-erected. Others were relocated to various places in Western Queensland.

Gold production had been the mainstay of the Queensland mining sector in the 1890s amounting to 85 per cent to 92.8 per cent of mining production during the decade. Apart from a brief spike in production at Mount Morgan in 1888–9, Charters Towers consistently out-produced the other major gold mining areas of Ravenswood, Gympie and Mount Morgan between 1880 and 1913, but figures for all centres declined in the early 20th century. Charters Towers' production of 96,046 ounces (2,722.9 kg) in 1912, fell to 42,777 ounces (1,212.7 kg) in 1916 and reduced further to 8,095 ounces (229.5 kg) by 1919.

Mining companies began folding: the Mills Day Dawn United, the New Queen Central, Moonstone and Telegraph in 1916. The New Brilliant Freehold Company went into liquidation in 1918. ED Miles and Thomas Mills were appointed liquidators. Miles died in 1922 during the winding up of the company, which dragged on to 1926. Joe Millican replaced Miles as liquidator and having retired to Sydney had liquidated the partnership of Miles and Millican sometime in 1922.

Miles's obituary declared that "there were few offices of dignity, importance or influence in Charters Towers with which Mr Miles was not at one time or another associated". He had been an alderman and mayor, chairman of the Charters Towers Water Board, member of the Townsville Harbour Board, president of the Charters Towers Chamber of Commerce, the Mining Institute, and the Mine Owners Association and secretary of the Charters Towers Hospital Board for over 20 years, and District Grand Master of the Masonic Lodge and member of the Manchester Unity International Order of Oddfellows. He was also the chairman of the association which established the School of Mines in Charters Towers in 1900. He was a member of the Queensland Legislative Council until his death on 10 March 1922, shortly before the abolition of the upper house on 23 March.

His partner Joe Millican was also a significant asset to the community being an alderman from 1888, the year after he became Miles' partner, and then becoming mayor in 1890. He was vice president of the Chamber of Commerce and the Charters Towers Stock Exchange, member of the executive of the Charters Towers Pastoral Agricultural and Mining Association, a member of the Manchester Unity International Order of Oddfellows, and either chairman or director of numerous mining companies and a member of the Queensland Legislative Assembly briefly between 1907 and 1908.

The ED Miles and Co. building was purchased in 1928 by the North Queensland Racing Association (NQRA) which had formed in Charters Towers in 1886. The NQRA reported it paid £400 and the offices were described as comprising a strong room, large board room and roomy offices, some of which would be made available for letting. The NQRA relocated its headquarters to Townsville in the 1960s. By 1965 the 1891 addition at the rear of the building had been demolished and an L-shaped structure (later demolished) was built behind the strong room.

The property was then sold to Bartlams Limited in 1966. Bartlams was involved in the sale of livestock and real estate, as well as being wine and spirit merchants, generally servicing western Queensland grazing properties. Bartlams had previously operated from part of the former Burns Philp building (Bartlam's Store) in Mosman Street from 1944 until 1966. Transferred again in 1974 to Albert Claude Oates, the former ED Miles building was then used for the operation of "Independent Tyre Dealers". The property was sold again in 1988 and the new owners lived in the building for a period. During this time, a large steel-framed structure on a concrete slab was constructed behind the building, facilitating tyre fitting and wheel balancing/alignments etc. The building was later leased to "Beaurepaires" who vacated the building in 2011.

There remain four known mining exchange buildings in Charters Towers: Hunter's (later Hunter and Harte) in Mosman Street, built in November 1886; the ED Miles and Company's in Mosman Street, (1887); Ineson and MaCallum's in Bow Street, (1892); and Alan Bright's in Mosman Street (1896). The former ED Miles building retains a significant proportion of its original fabric and configuration, whereas the interiors of the other buildings have been altered.

Throughout Australia, there are only three mining exchanges on state heritage registers: The Beehive building in Bendigo (1872, Victorian Heritage Register H0686); The Ballarat Mining Exchange (former) (1887, Victorian Heritage Register H0391) and the former Brown's Mart in Smith Street Darwin, which housed a mining exchange between 1887 and 1910 (Northern Territory Heritage Register, File H96/0014). Within the larger category of stock exchanges, the former ED Miles and Company building remains rare, with only the former Melbourne Stock Exchange in Collins Street listed on the Victorian Heritage Register (H0034) and the former Adelaide Stock Exchange (ID11580) on the South Australian Register. Identified extant Queensland Stock Exchanges include Charters Towers Stock Exchange Arcade, Exchange Building, Toowoomba and the Gympie Stock Exchange.

== Description ==
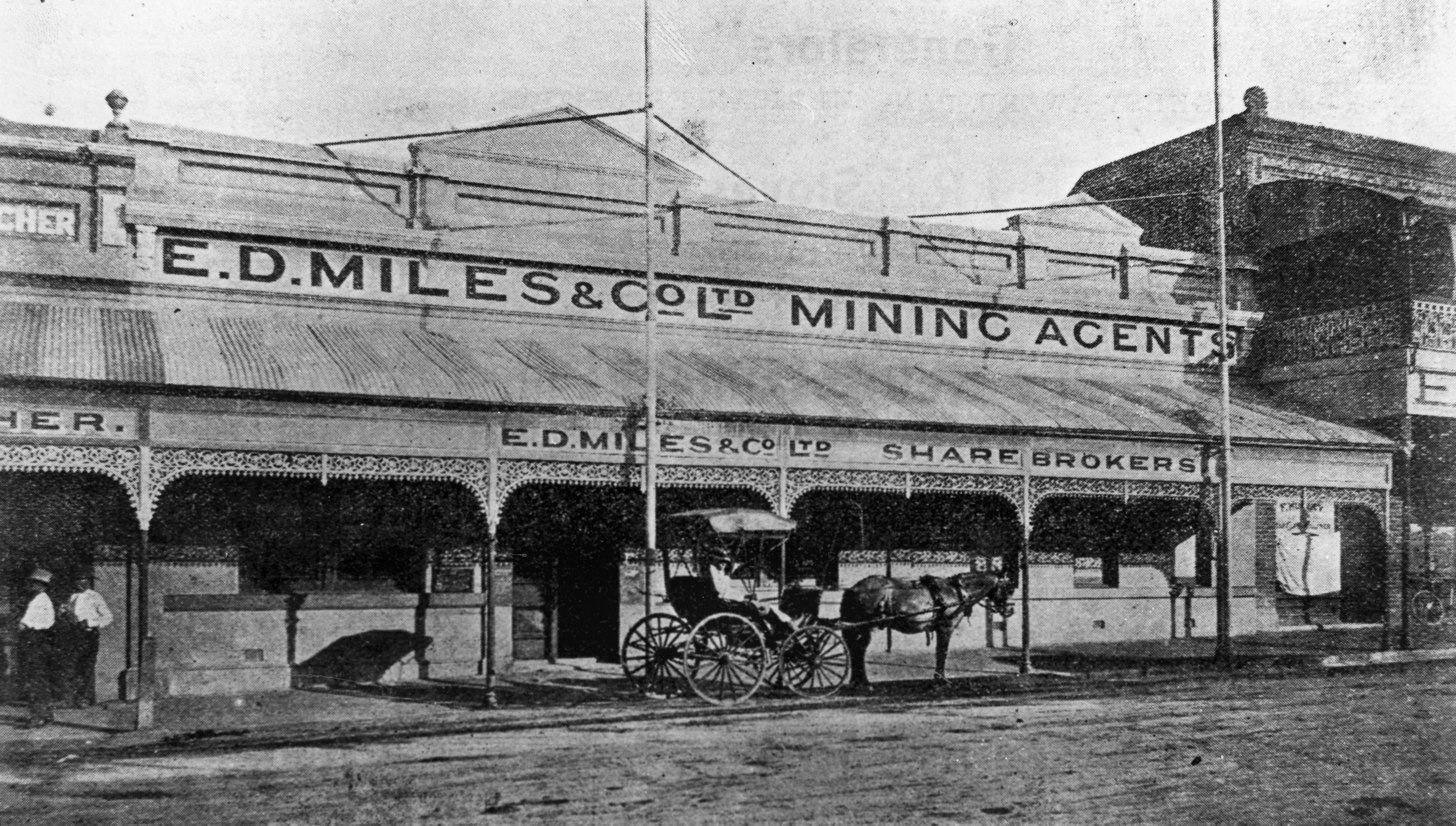
ED Miles Mining Exchange, 1909

The former ED Miles Mining Exchange is located at the northern end of the main commercial district on Mosman Street in Charters Towers, a street dominated by late nineteenth-century buildings. Bounded by commercial properties to the north and south, this single-storey timber building with rendered masonry facade embellished with classical detailing is built to the front and side alignments. With dual street access, the allotment extends through to Bow Street, where a large, steel-framed, metal-clad, skillion-roofed structure covers the rear of the site and a detached strong room.

The former mining exchange is clearly discernible as two volumes (1887, 1901) marked by dual pediments on the parapet and separate gabled roofs clad in corrugated metal sheeting, with the larger 1887 portion lit by a generous roof lantern. A curved awning roof clad in corrugated metal sheeting and supported on slim decorative cast-iron posts extends over the footpath along the width of this building and the adjoining premises to the north. Four of six cast-iron columns and a large proportion of a delicate cast-iron valance with brackets and pendants survive to the mining exchange building section of awning. A continuous moulded string course also extends across the length of the mining exchange building facade and the adjacent premises.

On the main facade, pilasters, a plinth and semi-circular fanlights over openings mark the extent of the 1887 building and distinguish it from the square headed openings of the 1901 addition. A continuous sill extends across the front of both sections, and all openings are framed with rendered mouldings. The 1887 portion comprises a double-leafed timber entrance door with a well-worn concrete threshold flanked by windows either side containing pairs of large timber casement (replacement) windows. The 1901 addition has double-hung timber windows with frosted glazing.

The remainder of the building is timber framed and lined. Exterior walls are single skin with externally exposed stud framing lined internally with boards detailed with double beading. Internal partitions are also single skin with stop-chamfered studs and these, together with the ceiling, are lined with single-beaded tongue and groove boards. The rooms are generally without cornices except the 1901 addition, which has a timber cove. Some joinery is painted, including four-panelled doors, French doors to the exterior and double-hung windows. That which is clear finished includes cedar windows in the north-west (front) and south-east (rear) walls of the 1901 addition and the architraves, reveals and fanlights of the large bi-folding door opening.

The 1887 portion of the building comprises a large public area (11 metres (36 ft) wide) with a substantial painted cedar counter on the left hand side. A central hallway (1.8 by 11.3 metres (5 ft 11 in × 37 ft 1 in)) separated from the public area by a pair of timber doors leads to the rear of the building and provides access to four rooms, two on each side which are interconnected with doorways. In the hallway wall, a slot exists into the area behind the counter, most likely for the quick transmission of documents. The front left-hand side office (former chief clerk's office) behind the public space has timber shelving with labels indicating it was used to store wine and spirits. Bathroom and laundry facilities have been fitted within the rear right-hand side room (former Millican's office) and there is a sink and cabinet located in the adjacent room (former board room), none of which are of cultural heritage significance.

With a 150-millimetre (5.9 in) higher floor level, the 1901 extension comprises two large rooms (7 by 4.2 metres (23 ft × 14 ft) each) connected by a large opening with fanlights above. Cedar bi-fold doors which originally graced this opening have been removed to The World Theatre (the former Australian Bank of Commerce) in Mosman Street. Access to the front room is from the public space of the 1887 structure, and to the rear room from the rear yard and through a short transverse corridor within the former board room.

A notable feature of the 1887 building is its provision of natural light and ventilation. The large, tapered-wall roof lantern (8 metres (26 ft) high) with operable windows straddles the hallway and front two offices, bathing them in natural light. Fanlights are located above all doorways and there is a variety of high-level windows in external timber walls throughout as well as timber fretwork ceiling roses in each of the rooms. An unusual ventilation device is located in the rooms along the windowless north-eastern built-to-boundary wall. In the corners of each room, triangular ventilation ducts (1.2 metres (3 ft 11 in) high) draw air from beneath the building as well as from the hallway through holes in the partition walls into the rooms.

The strong room (11 by 3 metres (36.1 ft × 9.8 ft)) is located on the north-eastern boundary. It has a concrete floor, thick masonry walls and a heavy steel entrance door facing the main building. Divided into two rooms by a concrete partition wall and second heavy metal door, the western end is constructed of externally rendered brickwork and the remainder is of concrete with a vaulted ceiling (2.5 metres (8 ft 2 in) high) throughout, laterally braced with metal tie rods. Wall vents provide air circulation to the larger western room and the eastern room contains evidence of timber shelving for storage, a timber cupboard and an early ceiling mounted metal light shade.

The rear yard is surfaced with concrete and is sheltered by steel awnings. These elements are not of cultural heritage significance.

== Heritage listing ==
The former ED Miles Mining Exchange was listed on the Queensland Heritage Register on 9 November 2012 having satisfied the following criteria.

The place is important in demonstrating the evolution or pattern of Queensland's history.

The former mining exchange building of ED Miles and Company, reputedly the largest share-broking company in Queensland for almost 40 years during the deep reef mining operations in Charters Towers, is significant in demonstrating the importance of mining exchanges in the evolution of Queensland's gold mining industry, a major contributor to Queensland's wealth. Established by Edward David Miles in 1883, the company provided management and share-broking services for mining companies in the Charters Towers goldfields, which was the highest producing gold field in Queensland, and the third largest in Australia. ED Miles and Company was reputedly the largest of its type in Queensland. The building, constructed in 1887, is a rare surviving and representative example of a highly intact purpose-built building, designed, constructed (1887) and thrice extended (1889, 1891 and 1901) for the purpose of operating a mining exchange.

The place demonstrates rare, uncommon or endangered aspects of Queensland's cultural heritage.

The ED Miles and Company mining exchange is rare as one of four known buildings of this type in Queensland, all located in Charters Towers; it being the most intact of these.

The place has potential to yield information that will contribute to an understanding of Queensland's history.

The building has the potential to contribute significantly to our understanding of the development of 19th-century passive ventilation features used in the construction and design of buildings in Queensland's hot dry areas. This building features a variation of Tobin Tube ventilation incorporated with high ceilings, part-height interior partitions, ventilated ceiling roses, operable fanlights, high-level windows and a large roof lantern with operable glazing.

The place is important in demonstrating the principal characteristics of a particular class of cultural places.

The building is important in demonstrating the principal characteristics of a mining exchange - a key activity in a prosperous gold mining town - including a public reception space with counters near the entry, interconnecting offices, board room, and large strong room. The highly intact and rare building is located within the financial district of Charters Towers.

The place is important because of its aesthetic significance.

The building is an important component of the commercial precinct of Mosman and Gill Streets, Charters Towers, comprising a collection of 19th-century gold era buildings of significance to Queensland. Situated at the northern end of this precinct, the building is an intact example of a small-scale commercial structure with modestly decorated facade and street awning, contributing to the variety and character of this townscape.

The place has a special association with the life or work of a particular person, group or organisation of importance in Queensland's history.

The building has a strong association with its founder Edward David Miles and his partner Joe Millican. Miles established his mining exchange business serving the Charters Towers deep reef gold mining in 1883, with Millican made partner in 1887, after completion of the building. Both men underpinned the success of ED Miles and Company, which provided services to 31 mining companies during the 1890s, outperforming others in town and reputedly the largest company of its type in Queensland, operating for 35 years from this building. While both men were active in many community organisations, both served local government and were Members of Parliament, the significance of the ED Miles Mining Exchange rests with their involvement with and importance to the Queensland gold mining industry.
