= Walter Hunt (architect) =

Walter Hunt (1870 – 3 May 1940) was an architect in Australia. A number of his works are now heritage-listed.

== Early life ==
Walter Hunt was born in Kiama, New South Wales in 1870, the youngest son of George Hunt. He trained as an architect in New South Wales.

In 1896 and 1897, he was an alderman in the Kiama Municipal Council and was involved in establishing the town's water supply.

== Architectural career ==
From 1902 he was a Fellow of the Institute of Architects New South Wales and from 1912 a Fellow of the Queensland Institute of Architects. He practised as an architect in Charters Towers from 1899 to 1910.

In 1911 Hunt formed a partnership with Charles Dalton Lynch called CD Lynch and Walter Hunt, Architects, Northern Queensland, located in Townsville. During that partnership the firm undertook diverse projects. Hunt practised as an architect and surveyor in Townsville from 1921 to 1931 and from 1923 taught architecture at Townsville Technical College. With his son, Maurice, Hunt operated Maurice and Walter Hunt, Architects, Townville from 1931.

== Later life ==
Hunt retired to Sydney in 1932. He died on 3 May 1940 in Sydney.

== Works ==
Buildings designed by Walter Hunt included:

- Grand Hotel, Kiama
- Ambulance Building, Charters Towers
- Charters Towers Swimming Baths (1900)
- Commonwealth Fountain in Lissner Park, Charters Towers (1900)
- the 1901 extension to the ED Miles Mining Exchange, Charters Towers

Buildings designed by C D Lynch and Walter Hunt, Architects, Northern Queensland included:

- the Bank of New South Wales, Hughenden
- a school at Cloncurry for the Father Murtagh
- the North Queensland Newspaper Co. office, Flinders Street, Townsville (1912)
- Paramount Picture Theatre, Townsville (1917)
- Waterside Workers Hall, South Townsville
- St Joseph's Church, North Ward, Townsville, (1921)
- the residence "Sellhurst", Cleveland Terrace, Townsville (1919)
- Dalgety & Co, Sturt Street, Townsville (1924–25)
- St Alban's Rectory, Innisfail.
