= Selhurst (disambiguation) =

Selhurst is a suburb of south London, England.

Selhurst may also refer to:

- Selhurst, North Ward, an historic house in Queensland, Australia
- Selhurst (ward), an electoral division in the London Borough of Croydon
- Selhurst School, a fictional school created by prankster H. Rochester Sneath
- Selhurst railway station in south London

== See also ==
- Selhurst Park, a football ground in south London, home of Crystal Palace FC
- Selhurst High School, the name of two schools in the London Borough of Croydon
