= St Joseph's Church, North Ward =

Church in Townsville, Queensland, Australia

- St Joseph on The Strand
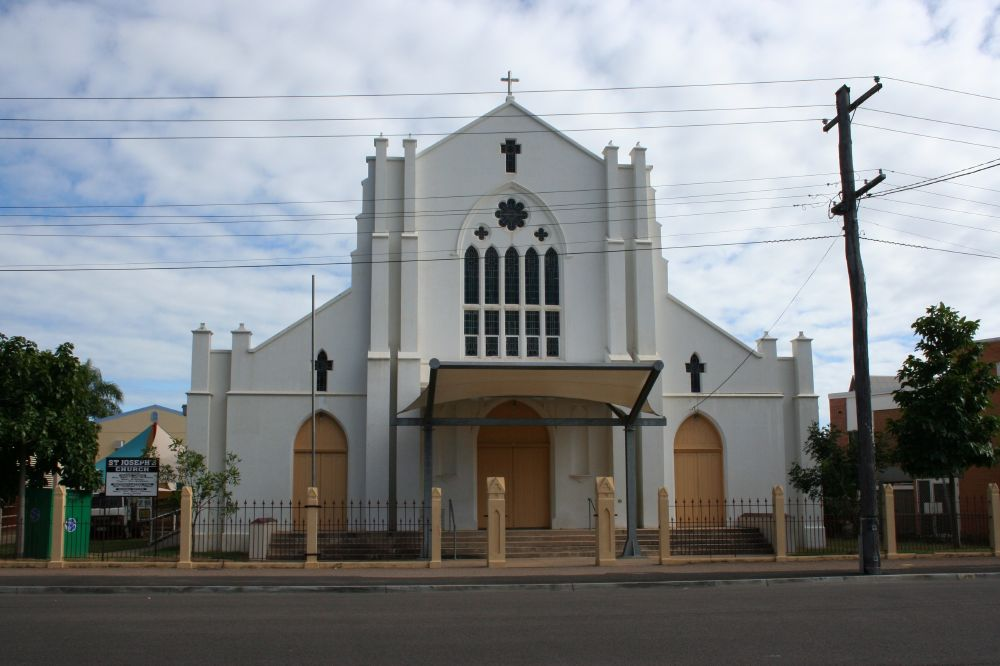
- St Josephs Church, 2006
- St Joseph's Church, North Ward
- 19°15′12″S 146°49′03″E
- Address: Fryer Street, North Ward, City of Townsville, Queensland
- Country: Australia
- Denomination: Roman Catholic

History
- Status: Church
- Founded: January 1919
- Founder: Bishop of Rockhampton Joseph Shiel
- Dedication: Saint Joseph
- Consecrated: 10 July 1921

Architecture
- Architects: Charles Dalton Lynch; Walter Hunt
- Architectural type: Church
- Style: Gothic Revival
- Years built: 1920–1921

Specifications
- Materials: Reinforced concrete; corrugated iron

Administration
- Diocese: Townsville

Queensland Heritage Register
- Official name: St Josephs Church
- Type: State heritage (built)
- Designated: 26 November 1999
- Reference no.: 602130
- Significant period: 1920s (historical) ongoing (social)
- Significant components: Church, views to, stained glass window/s, furniture/fittings
- Builders: Joseph Rooney

St Joseph's Church is a heritage-listed Roman Catholic church at Fryer Street, North Ward, City of Townsville, Queensland, Australia. It was designed by Charles Dalton Lynch and Walter Hunt and built from 1920 to 1921 by Joseph Rooney. It is also known as St Joseph on The Strand. It was added to the Queensland Heritage Register on 26 November 1999.

== History ==
St Joseph's Church was designed by Townsville architectural firm Charles Dalton Lynch and Walter Hunt, and was constructed by Townsville building firm Rooney Ltd in 1920–1921.

The new settlement of Cleveland Bay, established in 1864 at the mouth of Ross Creek, was part of the Roman Catholic Diocese of Brisbane. The first priest in the northern section of the new diocese was Fr William McGinty who established a parish centred on Bowen. Fr McGinty first visited Townsville (Cleveland Bay) in 1866 where he performed baptisms on 16 February and said Mass on the following Sunday in the Court and Customs House on Melton Hill.

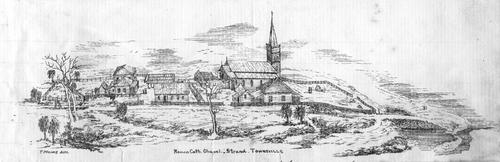
Church of St Joseph on the Strand, circa 1878

It was not until 1872 that the parish of Townsville was established with Fr Connolly as parish priest. The first church in the new parish, St Joseph's, was opened by Fr Connolly in 1872. The new timber building was located on The Strand close to the site of the present church. This church, which was the first constructed in the town, was destroyed by flood waters which swept the building out to sea during torrential rain in 1892.

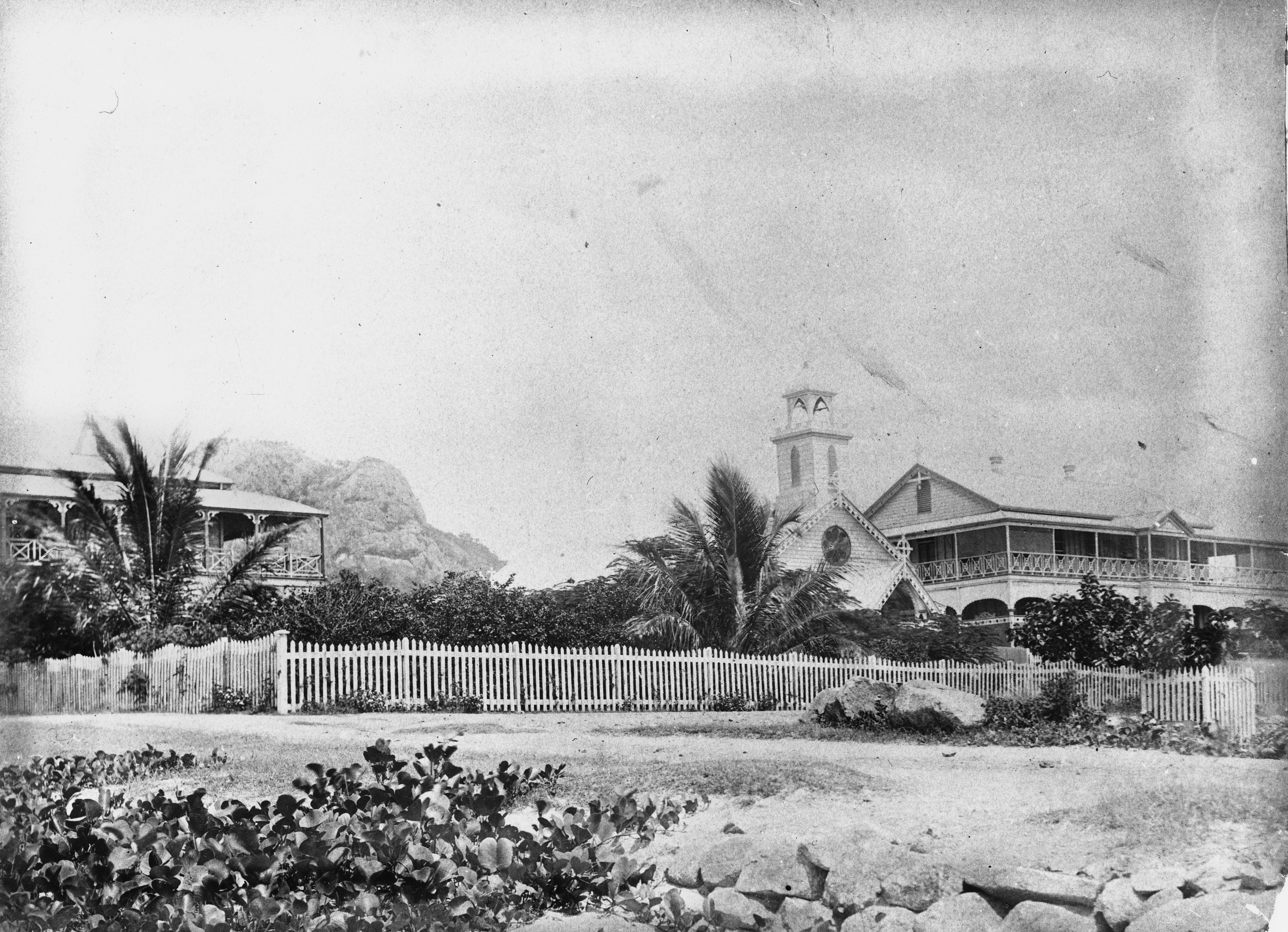
St. Josephs Church and Convent, 1888

In 1878, because of the vastness of the Queensland Vicariate, Bishop James Quinn, Bishop of Queensland, proposed that three new dioceses be established with one centred on Townsville. However, in 1882 only one new Queensland diocese was established with Rockhampton as its centre. Townsville waited a further fifty-two years before a diocese was established in the north.

Despite the disappointment Catholics in Townsville continued planning for the establishment of a Townsville Diocese. A great deal of work was done to establish Catholic institutions, religious orders and new parishes in the north Queensland portion of the Rockhampton Diocese. Part of this expansion included the construction of new schools and churches, including the Sacred Heart Cathedral, which was planned to be the cathedral church of the hoped-for Townsville diocese.

Because of the focus on the expansion of the Catholic Church across North Queensland during the later part of the nineteenth century, planning for a new St Joseph's Church did not begin until 1918. The new building was designed by Townsville architectural firm CD Lynch and Walter Hunt. The foundation stone was laid by Bishop of Rockhampton Joseph Shiel in January 1919. The building was constructed by Joseph Rooney of the well known north Queensland building firm of Rooneys Ltd. The new church was opened on Sunday 10 July 1921 by Bishop Shiel with Archbishop of Brisbane James Duhig in attendance.

The new church, which faced Fryer Street, was located close to the site of the original church which had faced the Strand. The altar, which was designed by parish priest Monsignor Bourke, was crafted by Joseph Rooney in memory of Matthew Rooney and his wife and daughter, who lost their lives when the ship Yongala sank off Cape Cleveland in 1911.

Since the construction of the first church on the site in 1872, St Joseph's Church and parish has been a focus for Catholic community worship and activity. Key church organisations have been located close by, including the parish presbytery, a Catholic orphanage, St Joseph's Primary School (established in 1875) and St Patrick's Secondary Day/Boarding School (established in 1905).

Small extensions, which were added to the church in the 1950s, increased the size of the rooms on either side of the altar. Some changes were made to the interior layout in the 1980s. The creation of a raised platform with a modern altar was in keeping with the changes recommended by the Second Vatican Council. These changes saw the removal of some pews and most of the statues; however the Rooney Commemorative Altar was not removed.

== Description ==
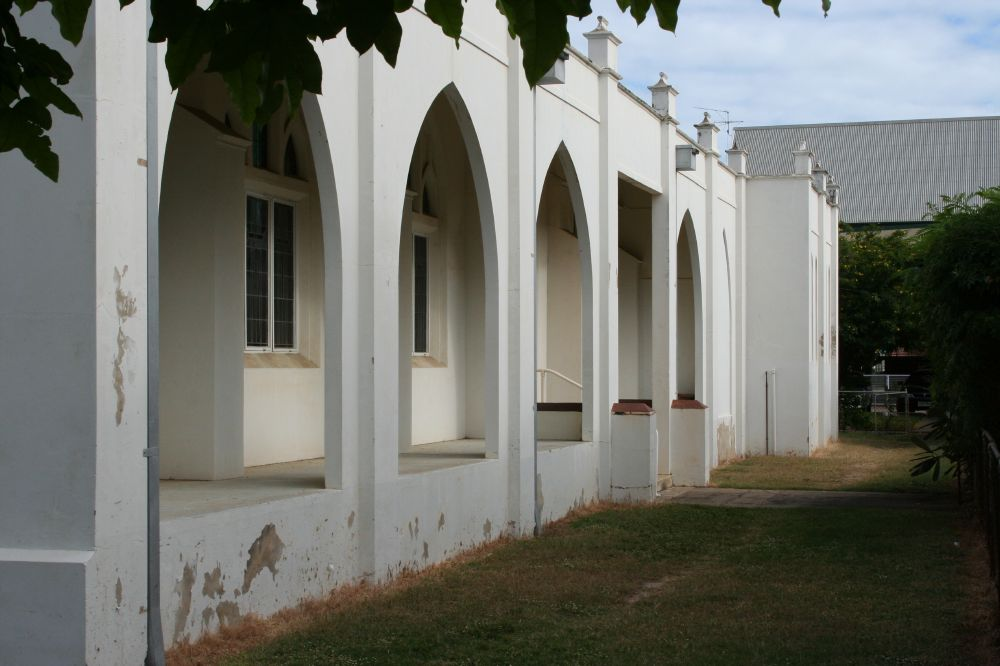
Side view, 2006

St Joseph's Church, a reinforced concrete structure with a corrugated iron gable roof to the nave and lower skillion roofs to the side aisles, is located on a level site fronting Fryer Street to the southeast. The church consists of the original central section which has had arcades added to both sides with vestries at the rear.

The southeast elevation is a symmetrical composition with a central pointed arch entrance with timber doors flanked by lancet shaped niches. The central entrance is surmounted by a large plate tracery window which comprises five lancets surmounted by two quatrefoils and a central foil with eight sections, and framed by an expressed moulding. A crucifix window is located above this window, and a small crucifix surmounts the gable parapet. The central section of this elevation is flanked by paired buttresses which separate the lower side aisles. The side aisles each have a pointed arch entrance with timber doors surmounted by a crucifix window. The side aisles are framed by paired buttresses (originally a single buttress, with the second buttress added as part of the side arcade). The church is accessed via concrete steps fronting Fryer Street. A marble foundation stone is located adjacent to the main entrance.

Both side elevations are similar, and each consists of a pointed arch arcade with parapet concealing a skillion roof to the side aisle. The pointed arches are separated by pilasters which extend above the parapet giving a castellated effect. Each arcade has a concrete floor, and a vestry is located at the rear. The windows to the side aisles are separated by buttresses, and consist of triple leadlight lancets with lower casements sections set in a pointed arch composition. Paired timber doors housed in a pointed arch open from the side aisle to the arcade. Each vestry projects from the arcade, and the side wall has six narrow pointed lancet windows, and a pointed arch timber door opens to the rear. The clerestory to the nave has paired leadlight lancets set in a pointed arch recess. The southwestern side has a concrete ramp with metal handrail accessing the arcade.

The rear of the building has less decorative mouldings with buttresses separating two leadlight windows, each of which consists of tall paired lancets either side of the central altar. A circular leadlight window with central quatrefoil is located at the top of the gable. The location of original doors is evidenced by pointed arch recesses at the rear of the side aisles.

Internally, the building has a timber gallery above the entrance accessed by a corner timber stair with turned balusters. The side aisles are separated from the nave by concrete columns surmounted by pointed arches with expressed mouldings. The building has a concrete floor, and the nave has a scissor braced King-post roof with curved side braces and lined with diagonal boarding.

The church has a highly decorative carved timber altar, set against the rear wall on a raised platform, comprising a tiered arrangement of pointed arch niches housing statues and surmounted by a crucifix. The rear wall has timber panelling to the height of the column capital, and the northeastern side aisle has a carved timber altar and timber altar rail. A memorial plaque to Monsignor Bourke is located on the wall of the northeastern side aisle. Church furniture includes timber pews and decorative Stations of the Cross.

The Fryer Street boundary is fenced with concrete pillars with pointed arch recesses and metal palisade panels.

== Heritage listing ==
St Joseph's Church was listed on the Queensland Heritage Register on 26 November 1999 having satisfied the following criteria.

The place is important in demonstrating the evolution or pattern of Queensland's history.

St Joseph's Church, erected in 1920–21 with additions carried out in the 1950s, is important in demonstrating the establishment and growth of the Catholic Church in North Queensland.

The place is important in demonstrating the principal characteristics of a particular class of cultural places.

St Joseph's Church exhibits the principal characteristics of a Roman basilica, is of aesthetic significance and makes an important contribution to the Fryer Street streetscape.

The place is important because of its aesthetic significance.

The church has a particularly fine interior, including a finely crafted altar, scissor truss roof, choir gallery and leadlight windows. The Church, constructed of reinforced concrete, is an early example of the adoption of this building material for the cyclone enforced renewal of churches in North Queensland.

The place has a strong or special association with a particular community or cultural group for social, cultural or spiritual reasons.

St Joseph's Church is significant for its special association with the Townsville parish, the first Catholic parish established in North Queensland after settlement. St Joseph's Church is the second church erected at the site and is significant for its strong and special association as a centre of Catholic worship and community life since the 1920s.

the altar has a special association with Joseph Rooney. The altar, which was designed by parish priest Monsignor Bourke, was crafted by Joseph Rooney in memory of Matthew Rooney and his wife and daughter, who lost their lives when the ship Yongala sank off Cape Cleveland in 1911.

The place has a special association with the life or work of a particular person, group or organisation of importance in Queensland's history.

The church is an important example of the work of Townsville architectural firm of CD Lynch and Walter Hunt, and north Queensland building firm Rooney Ltd.
