= Osler House, Townsville =

Osler House
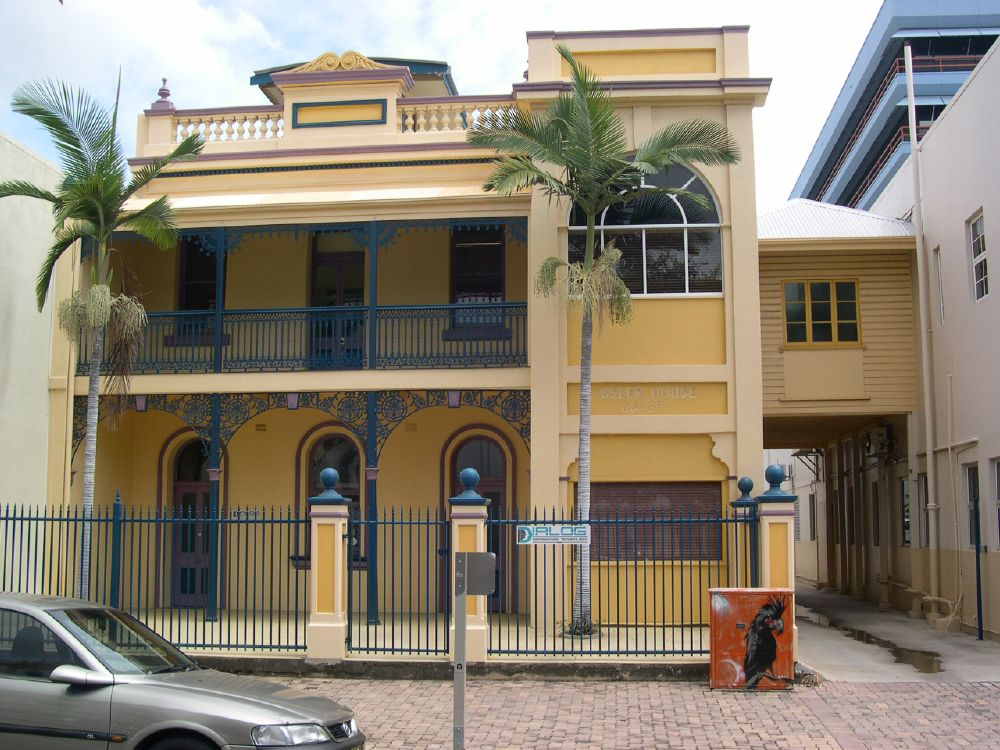
- Osler House, 2005

- Location within Queensland Location within Australia
- 19.2578°S 146.8165°E
- Location: 35 Sturt Street, Townsville CBD, City of Townsville, Queensland, Australia

History
- Design period: 1870s–1890s (late 19th century)
- Built: 1888–1950s

Site notes
- Architect: W G Smith & Sons
- Architectural style: Italianate

Queensland Heritage Register
- Official name: Osler House
- Type: state heritage (built)
- Designated: 21 October 1992
- Reference no.: 600931
- Significant period: 1880s, 1900s, 1950s (fabric); 1889–1901, 1906–1980s (historical medical use)

Osler House is a heritage-listed detached house at 35 Sturt Street, Townsville CBD, City of Townsville, Queensland, Australia. It was designed by W G Smith & Sons and built from 1888 to 1950s. It was added to the Queensland Heritage Register on 21 October 1992.

== History ==
Osler House was designed in 1888, by William George Smith and Sons, for prominent North Queensland businessman and member of the Queensland Parliament, John Deane. It is believed to have been designed specifically for rental as a doctor's surgery and residence and was ready for occupation in April 1889.

The building was constructed as an investment property for John Deane, a prominent northern parliamentarian, businessman and mining magnate, who had owned the land since 1869. The building, as described in the North Queensland Telegraph of 29 April 1889, did not have a projecting gable on the northern side. As such it would have resembled a single bay of a terrace of the kind built in the southern colonies and to a far lesser extent in Brisbane. As the house was built to one side of Deane's block, it is possible that it was originally intended to add adjoining bays.

Osler House is the only known example of the domestic work of the important North Queensland architectural firm of W.G. Smith and Sons. William George Smith was born in London and arrived in Brisbane in 1861, initially working as a carpenter and joiner. By 1869 he was a building contractor in Maryborough. In 1875, he became a foreman for the Queensland Department of Public Works and was transferred to Townsville in this capacity in 1879. In 1886, he left the department to join his son, W.G. Smith Junior, who was already in practice as an architect in Townsville. In time they were joined by Smith's other sons; Charles, Frederick and George. The firm had branch offices in Charters Towers, Mackay and Cairns and are best known for the Town Hall and Market Reserve Buildings in Townsville and also designed a number of large hotels. The firm continued in business until 1910.

At the time the house was built, its style was considered most unusual in Townsville, representing "a departure in residential street architecture", according to the local newspaper. When built, it had a surgery and dining room on the ground floor and a drawing room, two bedrooms and a pantry on the upper floor. A separate brick building to the rear contained the kitchen, bathroom and servant's room. That it was intended as a doctor's surgery and residence is indicated by the fact that the largest room, which would normally be used as the drawing room, was located upstairs and a rather smaller room downstairs was designated as the surgery. It was common practice in the 19th century for doctors to set up a surgery in their home, but this was normally an adaptation of an ordinary house. This is the earliest surviving building identified in Queensland which appears to have been purpose designed for a medical practitioner's use. The building was also well ventilated being praised as "about the coolest in town".

Dr Sidney Spark was the first tenant and occupied the house until he moved to the South in 1891. Dr Walter Nisbet, another well-known medical practitioner, was the next tenant until 1899 when he left to join the Australian medical contingent during the Boer War. Nesbit served at one of the largest military hospitals in South Africa for 2 years, rising to the rank of major.

In 1901, the property was leased by the Commercial Travellers Association who established a club in the building. This may have been the period when the two storey verandah extension was added, as in the 1890s a small shop occupied that section of the block, but in a view of the area taken in 1906, the shop has gone and the verandah can clearly be seen. It had arches and a cast iron valance matching the front of the building and may well have also been designed by Smith and Sons. If there had been any intention of constructing a small terrace, it had been abandoned at this point. The club only lasted in the building for a few years and in 1906 the building was again occupied by a medical man, Dr Stuart Burnie. In 1910 it was purchased by Jane McWilliam. The medical association continued as she rented the property to Dr DEA Buchanan, later well known as the superintendent of the hospital at Rockhampton.

In 1918, the property was purchased by Dr Gordon Ross, who had rented it since 1914. Dr Ross was prominent in northern medical circles. He was founder of the Lister Hospital, the forerunner of the present Mater Misericordia Hospital, and had been superintendent of the Townsville General Hospital. Ross sold Osler House in 1928 to yet another well-known northern medical practitioner, Dr H.J. Taylor. It is thought that the building may have been named Osler House in the 1930s in honour of Sir William Osler, a distinguished Canadian physician who developed modern methods of clinical training and was the author of the influential Principles and Practice of Medicine.

In 1937, Dr Taylor sold the building and the practice to Dr Leslie Halberstater. Dr Halberstater was well known throughout the north, both in medical and racing circles, and was prominently associated with the development of the Mater Hospital. In 1957, the land was subdivided into 2 blocks and in 1875 a building was constructed on Lot 1 and was sold in 1981. After Dr Halberstater's retirement, the building was rented by other well-known medical practitioners, the last being Dr Michael Rooney who purchased the property in 1983, but sold it soon afterwards. The building fell into disrepair for a few years, but was renovated as offices.

Osler House was originally free standing but is now flanked by modern buildings. The verandah to the side has been enclosed and a further timber extension has been made at the first floor level over the driveway. The original cast iron frieze, columns and balustrade were replaced with a full height screen of louvres and the curved profile verandah roof was replaced by a straight profile sheeting, possibly in the Interwar period. This alteration has recently been reversed. Changes have also been made to the interior to accommodate change of use over the years.

In 2016, it is occupied by a tax and accountancy business.

== Description ==
Osler House is a two-storeyed house of rendered brick in an Italianate style reminiscent of terraced housing of its period. It has a corrugated iron roof and lantern concealed by a balustraded parapet and has a projecting bay on the northern side. Adjoining this is a verandah to the upper level with cast iron balustrading, It is supported on cast iron pillars with decorative cast iron brackets in-filling the upper corners to create an arched effect.

Each level of the house on the front elevation has two entrances with a sash windows between. Both doors and windows have round headed transom lights. There is a balcony to the rear and this has been enclosed, having casement windows to the upper level, although a lattice section remains at the side. A single-storey service wing projects at the rear. This is of brick and has apparently been re- roofed. In the 1950s the building was joined to the next door structure by an enclosed timber bridging section at the upper level, to allow ingress of vehicles to the rear yard.

The interior of the building, though now used as offices, retains the original layout of the earliest section and joinery details including doors, windows and elaborate fretwork transoms over ground floor doors.

== Heritage listing ==
Osler House was listed on the Queensland Heritage Register on 21 October 1992 having satisfied the following criteria.

The place is important in demonstrating the evolution or pattern of Queensland's history.

Osler House, as an early purpose designed surgery and residence for medical practitioners, demonstrates an aspect of the growth of medical services in Queensland. Buildings designed for private medical practice are known in Brisbane at this date, but not in North Queensland and foreshadow the move towards such specialised buildings in the early 20th century.

The place demonstrates rare, uncommon or endangered aspects of Queensland's cultural heritage.

It is a rare surviving example of a 19th-century combined doctor's residence and surgery which appears to have been specifically designed for this usage. It is also a rare example of a building of this style and material in North Queensland.

The place has a strong or special association with a particular community or cultural group for social, cultural or spiritual reasons.

Osler House has a long history of usage as the home and workplace of a number of noted North Queensland medical practitioners.

The place has a special association with the life or work of a particular person, group or organisation of importance in Queensland's history.

Osler House is the only identified example of the domestic architecture of W G Smith and Sons, an architectural firm that had considerable influence on the architecture of north Queensland.
