= Townsville Masonic Hall =

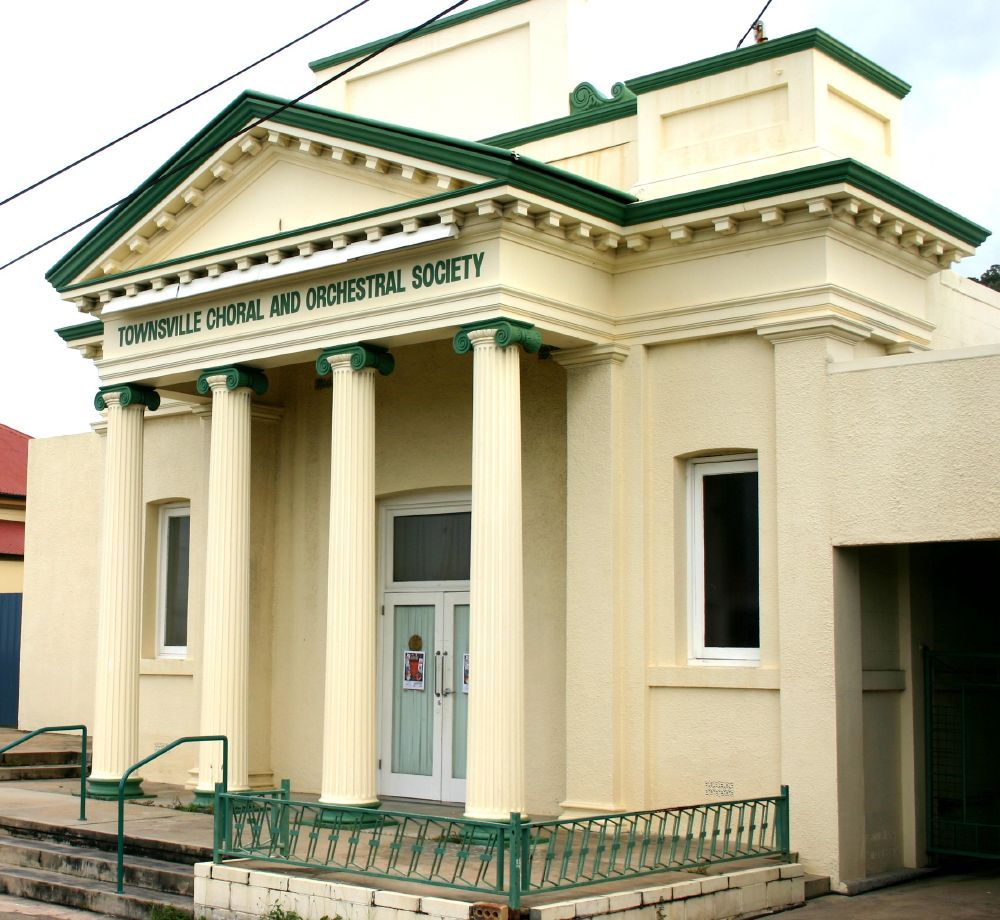
- Former Townsville Masonic Hall

- Location within Queensland Location within Australia
- 19.2648°S 146.8102°E
- Location: 485-493 Sturt Street, Townsville CBD, City of Townsville, Queensland, Australia

History
- Design period: 1870s–1890s (late 19th century)
- Built: 1889

Site notes
- Architect: W G Smith & Sons
- Architectural style: Classicism

Queensland Heritage Register
- Official name: Masonic Hall, Townsville (former), Assembly of God Hall, Calvary Temple, Townsville Choral & Orchestral Society Building, Townsville Choral Society Inc. Building, Townsville Choral and Orchestral Society Building
- Type: state heritage (built)
- Designated: 21 October 1992
- Reference no.: 600933
- Significant period: 1889, 1970–1971 (fabric); 1889–1934, 1934–1980 (historical)
- Significant components: font – baptismal
- Builders: Sparre & Hansen

Townsville Masonic Hall is a heritage-listed former masonic temple at 485–493 Sturt Street, Townsville CBD, City of Townsville, Queensland, Australia. It was designed by W G Smith & Sons and built in 1889 by Sparre & Hansen. It is also known as Assembly of God Hall, Calvary Temple, Townsville Choral & Orchestral Society Building, Townsville Choral Society Inc. Building, and Townsville Choral and Orchestral Society Building. It was added to the Queensland Heritage Register on 21 October 1992.

== History ==
This single-storeyed masonry building was erected in 1889 as Townsville's first masonic hall, on a site acquired in 1888 by the Townsville Masonic Hall Company Ltd, all the shareholders of which were freemasons.

Freemasonry was established in Townsville in 1866, with the creation of the Hibernia and Albion Star Lodge, no.289 under the Irish constitution. Townsville Lodge, no.1596 under the English constitution, was established in 1875. Both lodges met at a variety of venues until the purpose-built masonic hall was constructed in 1889. Its location in Sturt Street West reflected the 1880s spread of population to the West End, where the need for a building suitable for lodge meetings was growing evident by the late 1880s. The project was a combined effort of both lodges in Townsville, but was initiated by members of the Hibernia and Albion Star Lodge.

The hall was designed by North Queensland architects WG Smith & Sons, and erected by contractors Sparre & Hansen, with a contract price of £1,175. Smith (it is not clear whether this was William George Smith senior or junior) and Sparre were freemasons. The foundation stone was laid in May 1889, and an elaborate opening ceremony was conducted the following August. The building was described at the time as simple and severe, but beautifully finished and delightfully cool.

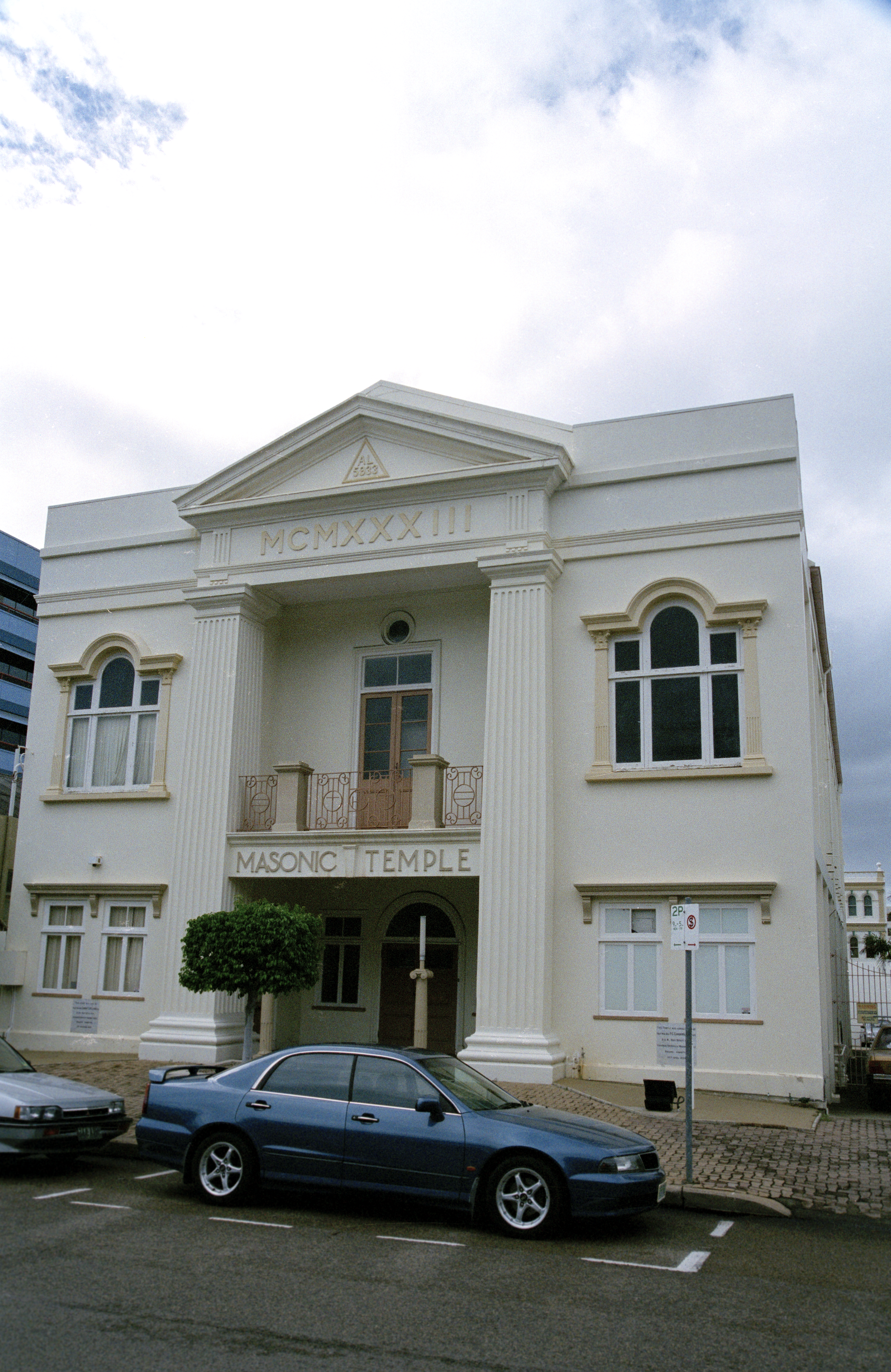
The "new" Townsville Masonic Template in Walker Street

However, by 1926, it was decided that a new temple was needed and a two-storey reinforced-concrete hall was constructed at 42 Walker Street in 1934 (which is still in use in 2016).

The Sturt Street building was then sold to the Townsville Assembly of God, who occupied the building until 1980. The Assemblies of God (Queensland) (now known as the Australian Christian Churches) was formed in 1929, with the amalgamation of ten pentecostal groups from around the state, including that established in Townsville c. 1924.

In 1970–71, several old structures at the rear of the building were demolished, the sides and back of the hall were extended, and the building was re-opened by the Assembly of God in 1971 as the Calvary Temple. The building was used principally as a meeting place, but for a brief time in the late 1970s it housed an Assembly of God school for grades 1 to 10.

In 1980 the building was transferred to trustees of the Townsville Choral and Orchestral Society; providing office and rehearsal space. The Society formed in 1906 as the Townsville Musical Union. In 2013 the former Masonic Hall continues to be used by the Townsville Choral Society Incorporated.

== Description ==
The former Masonic Hall in Townsville is a single-storeyed structure overlooking Sturt Street to the south-east.

The building has a rendered classical front facade consisting of a tetrastyle portico, in the Ionic order which, within Freemasonry, symbolises strength. In 2009 the entablature was painted with the words TOWNSVILLE CHORAL SOCIETY. The facade, with pilasters supporting the entablature with a square parapet above, sits on a raised concrete platform.

The hall has a gabled roof clad with metal sheeting with lean-to structures to either side and the rear. These additions are constructed in concrete block and have louvred windows to the north-west and south-west, and a covered driveway along the eastern boundary.

Internally, the building has undergone major refurbishment with new wiring, floors, ceilings, kitchen and fittings. A large, tiled baptismal font is located under the current stage and survives from the building's use by the Assembly of God.

A two-storeyed chamferboard residence is located at the rear of the allotment, with a concrete block toilet building adjacent. Both are outside the heritage register boundary.

The front of the site is concreted with a low masonry wall and metal fence.

== Heritage listing ==
The former Townsville Masonic Hall was listed on the Queensland Heritage Register on 21 October 1992 having satisfied the following criteria.

The place is important in demonstrating the evolution or pattern of Queensland's history.

The former Masonic Hall, erected in 1889 as Townsville's first masonic hall, is important in demonstrating the pattern of Queensland's history, in particular the development of the West End of Townsville in the 1880s and 1890s.

The place is important in demonstrating the principal characteristics of a particular class of cultural places.

It is important in demonstrating the principal characteristics of a small masonic hall establishing a strong street presence/identity.

The place is important because of its aesthetic significance.

It is important in exhibiting a range of aesthetic characteristics valued by the Townsville community, in particular its strong contribution, through its architectural form, scale and materials, to the streetscape of Sturt Street and to the Townsville townscape; and its classical facade, seen as a landmark which reflects masonic identity.

The place has a special association with the life or work of a particular person, group or organisation of importance in Queensland's history.

The building has had a special association with Freemasonry in Townsville for over 45 years, and with North Queensland architects WG Smith & Sons, as an example of their work.
