= Boer War Veterans Memorial Kiosk and Lissner Park =

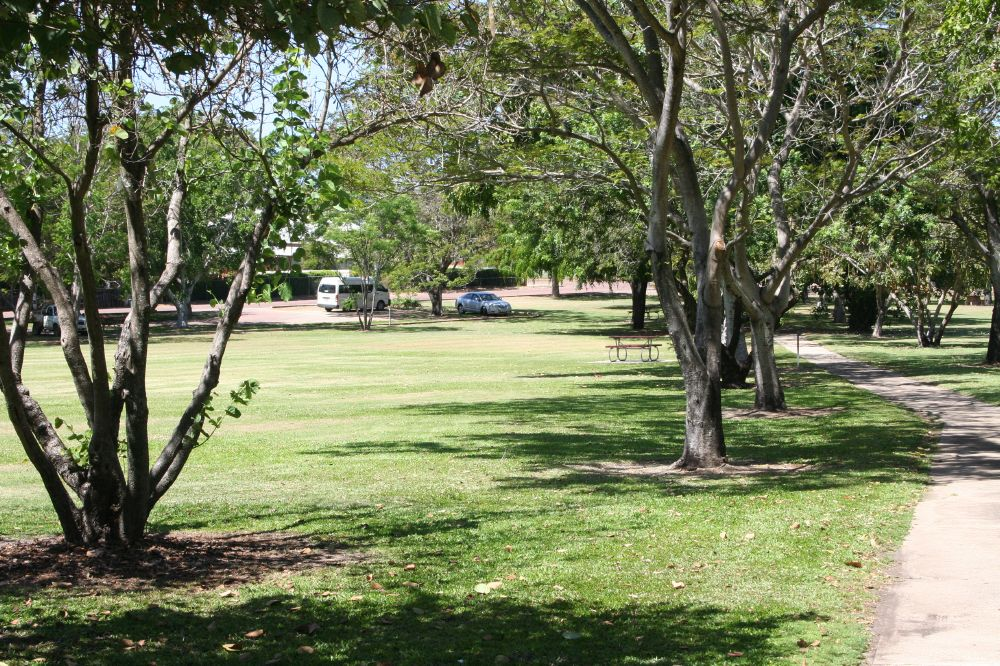
- Lissner Park, 2009

- Location within Queensland Location within Australia
- 20.072°S 146.2609°E
- Location: Bridge Street, Charters Towers City, Charters Towers, Charters Towers Region, Queensland, Australia

History
- Design period: 1870s–1890s (late 19th century)
- Built: 1883–1988

Queensland Heritage Register
- Official name: Boer War Veterans Memorial Kiosk and Lissner Park
- Type: state heritage (built, landscape)
- Designated: 21 October 1992
- Reference no.: 600397
- Significant period: 1883– (social); 1883–1988 (historical); 1883–1959 (fabric)
- Significant components: natural feature – cliff, pond/s – garden, bandstand/rotunda, fountain, memorial – kiosk, fernery, trees/plantings, bridge – foot/pedestrian, enclosure/s – animal, playground, gate/s

Boer War Veterans Memorial Kiosk and Lissner Park is a heritage-listed memorial at Bridge Street, Charters Towers City, Charters Towers, Charters Towers Region, Queensland, Australia. It was built from 1883 to 1988. It was added to the Queensland Heritage Register on 21 October 1992.

== History ==
A Temporary Reserve for Public Recreation of 18 acres (7.3 ha) 3 roods (33,000 sq ft; 3,000 m^{2}) 34 perches (860 m^{2}), bounded by Anne, Deane, Bridge and Church Streets, Charters Towers, was proclaimed on 15 May 1883. In 1888 the reserve was named Lissner Park after Isidor Lissner, a Charters Towers businessman and politician and later a minister in the 1893 Griffith Ministry. Discovered in late 1871, Charters Towers became the richest of the North Queensland mining fields. The field was proclaimed a town in 1877, and by the early 1880s was a prosperous settlement which made a major contribution to the social, political and economic development of North Queensland.

The predominant vegetation of the Charters Towers district was Eucalyptus woodland and open Eucalyptus woodland, which was quickly destroyed as timber was felled and used as shoring for the mines, for building purposes, and as fuel for the Cornish boilers. Concern that the environment was being destroyed led to protests about the loss of vegetation from leading citizens, including Anglican Bishop Gilbert White and Isidore Lissner MLA. As a result of the devastation and in keeping with the prevailing belief that the development of gardens improved the moral character and social well being of the community, Lissner encouraged the Charters Towers Municipal Council to request that a reserve be set aside for recreation and botanical purposes.

A Temporary Reserve for Public Recreation, proclaimed on 15 May 1885, was placed under "the control of the Municipal Council" and on 17 August 1891 the park became a permanent reserve with the Municipal Council appointed as trustees.

The park was named after Isidor Siegfried Lissner who arrived in Charters Towers in 1873 after living for some time on mining fields in southern Australia. During his time in Charters Towers Lissner developed a financial empire based on mining and commercial interests. He took a keen interest in community affairs and pushed for the establishment of sporting facilities and public amenities such as Lissner Park. At the urging of his friend Robert Philp he stood for the seat of Charters Towers in 1883. After his election to the Queensland Legislative Assembly, he became a strong advocate for better community services for the municipality and he won the approval of the community when he opposed the introduction of cheap Asian, Kanaka and German labour into the mining and sugar industries. Lissner was also a supporter of the North Queensland Separation Movement and he became Minister for Mines and Public Works in 1893.

Development of the park was funded by government grants of £350 in 1885 and £175 in 1889. Early work included clearing stumps and rubbish, leveling the ground and tree planting. Tenders were called for a gardener in June 1889 after the first plantings died. The new gardener replanted the park with trees supplied by Ben Gulliver of Acacia Vale Nursery in Townsville. While Ben Gulliver was actively involved in supplying plants to several botanical gardens in North Queensland there is no evidence that Lissner Park was developed as a botanical gardens. Some of the Gulliver trees which still survive include tamarinds, figs, various palms and pine trees.

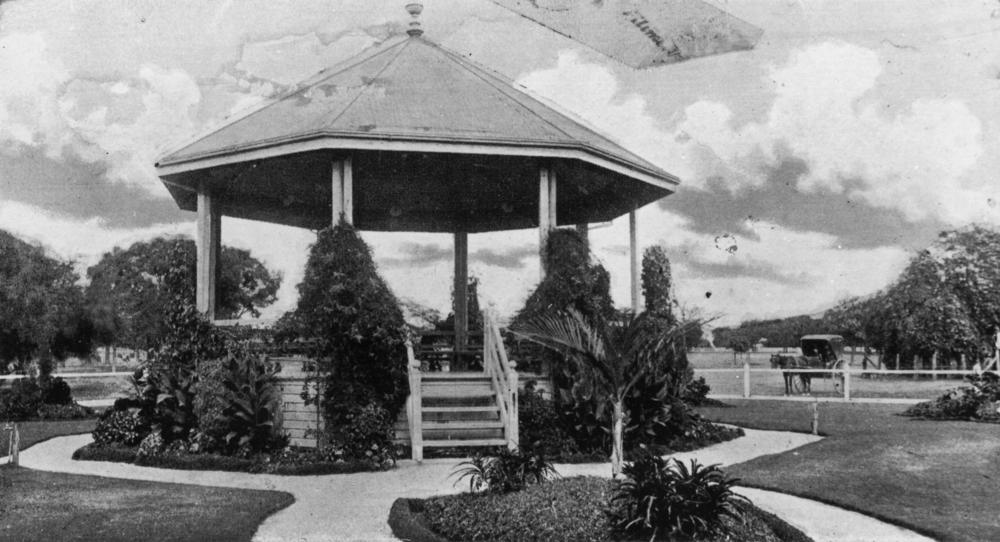
Bandstand in Lissner Park, ca. 1905

The public quickly saw the value of an area reserved for recreation and took advantage of the cleared ground to build a cricket pitch. Attending concerts in the park became a favourite evening pastime as well. As the popularity of attending social and musical events in the park grew, the Lissner Park Committee, set up to raise funds to oversee the development of the reserve, suggested that a Band Pavilion Fund be established to pay for the construction of a pavilion. In 1889, Charters Towers architect William George Smith jnr, designed a structure which cost £250 to build. The design was octagonal with a 48 feet (15 m) diameter platform in the centre for the band. Around this stage there was space for dancing or for seating. The corrugated iron roof was supported by ornamental iron pillars and provision was made in the design for curtains to be let down to protect the band if rain fell.

Other celebrations held in the park included Queen Victoria's Jubilee, the birth of Federation, memorial events at the death of Queen Victoria and events to honour people who went to the Boer War and World War I.

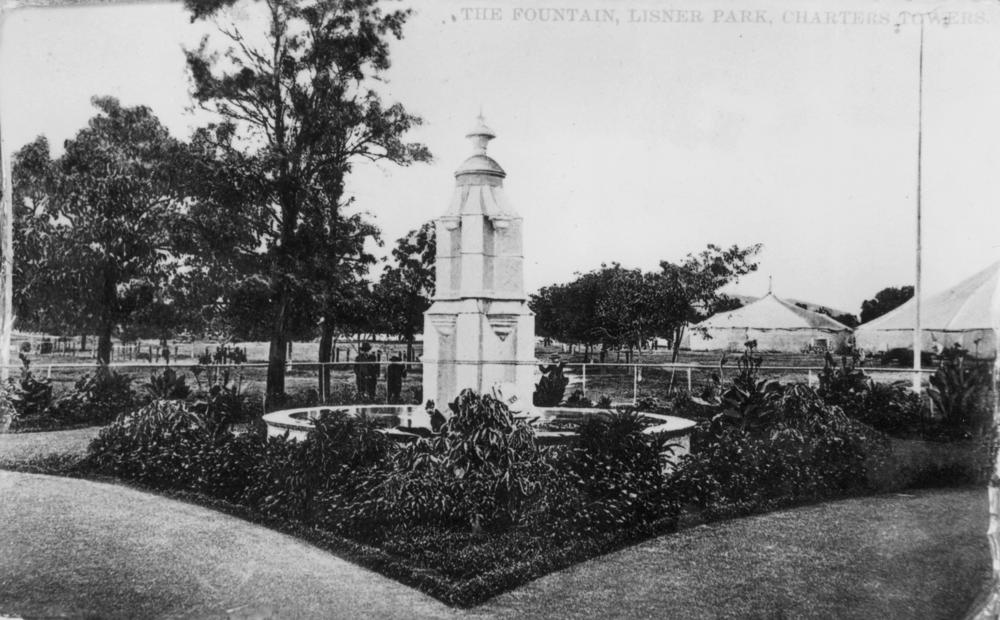
Fountain at Lissner Park, ca. 1906

During the Boer War a South African Patriotic Fund was established in Charters Towers to assist families and soldiers affected by the war in Africa. £1200 was left in the fund after the war and the Municipal Council suggested that a kiosk be built in Lissner Park as a memorial to Charters Towers people who served in the war. In 1909 the Council offered a prize for the best design for a Memorial Kiosk. Mr F Jorgensen, Director of the Technical College, won the competition, however, during construction his design was slightly altered when the floor design of the Australian Flag and the Union Jack, to be created in tiles, was removed because it was seen as inappropriate that people would walk on the flags. It is not known who built the kiosk but the iron work was supplied by local foundry Walton & Millgate. An honour board, erected at the western end of the kiosk, contains the names of those soldiers from the district who lost their lives during the Boer War. Over 7000 people attended the opening ceremony and enjoyed the promenade concert after the opening by Mayor Sydney Hood Thorp. The celebrations lasted all day and during the evening the band rotunda, fountain and kiosk were brightly lit for the concert.

Because the park had become a recognised central gathering place it became the obvious location for protest meetings in the late 1880s and early 1890s. On 24 March 1889 a vocal group from the Charters Towers Mining Union met in the park to pass a resolution asking the government to amend the 1884 Land Act to give miners the right to mine lease hold land. In another meeting in the park in July 1889 2500 miners and local people assembled to discuss and give support to the strikers at the Day Dawn PC Mine who were out on strike over measures taken by the owners to prevent gold being stolen. A gathering in August 1889 gave support to the government's proposal to introduce an eight-hour day and a meeting, called by the Charters Towers Branch of the Australian Labor Federation, met in the park on 1 March 1891. The issue under discussion was the need for a resolution of the dispute between shearers and pastoralists over working conditions and wages. The Lissner Park meeting requested that the government bring both parties together to resolve the issue and that conciliation boards be established by the government to settle such disputes in future.

Photographic evidence indicates that a bush house, which no longer exists, was constructed in April, 1891. A "tin" fountain, installed prior to 1910, was removed from the park in 1964 or 65 when the Lions Club built a ceramic tiled fountain. The original tin fountain, which no longer works, has recently been returned to the park. A small lake was constructed in 1911 and the toilets and lighting were extended in 1912.

A small zoo, which was constructed at the northern end of the park along Plummer St, is now being slowly removed because the care of animals is costly and time consuming. A new, smaller, animal enclosure was developed in 1988 on the site of the 1911 lake.

A memorial to Joseph and William Hann, early explorers and pastoralists in the Kennedy District, was erected in 1959 to celebrate the centenary of pastoral settlement. The stone used in the memorial was taken from Basalt River near the Bluff Downs homestead where William Hann first settled. Extensive concrete paths were constructed under the Red Scheme in the 1970s. These walkways follow the line of some earlier "cinder" paths which crisscrossed the park.

The recreation reserve was reduced in size in 1971 when a swimming pool was constructed at the northern end of the park on land bounded by Plummer and Church Streets. It was probably at this time that Mosman Creek, which now forms the boundary between the park and the pool, was lined with concrete and stone along the section bordering the park.

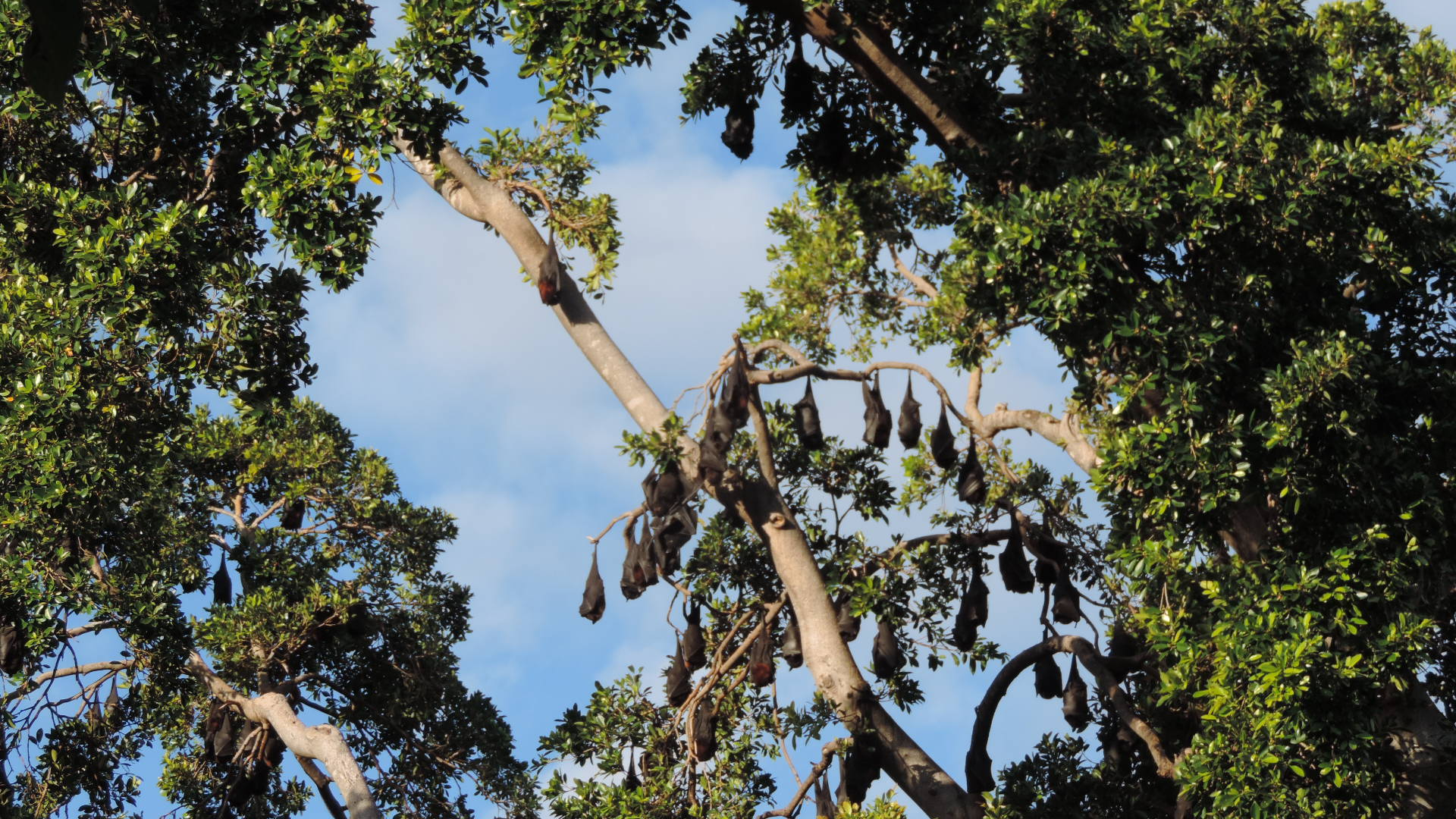
Roosting flying foxes in Lissner Park, 2016

Some renovations to the kiosk were carried out in mid 1970. The Boer War Veterans Memorial Kiosk was entered on the Register of the National Estate in 1978 and in 1989 a National Estate Grant of $31,300 was awarded for conservation work on the kiosk.

The bandstand has recently been repaired and painted and the installation of an irrigation system to water the whole park has created a pleasant, cool environment which is being utilised by the local community and travellers.

Since at least 2010, Lissner Park has attracted large number of roosting flying foxes, which are disliked by the residents. However, they are a protected species and humane methods to discourage them have been ineffective.

== Description ==
=== Lissner Park ===
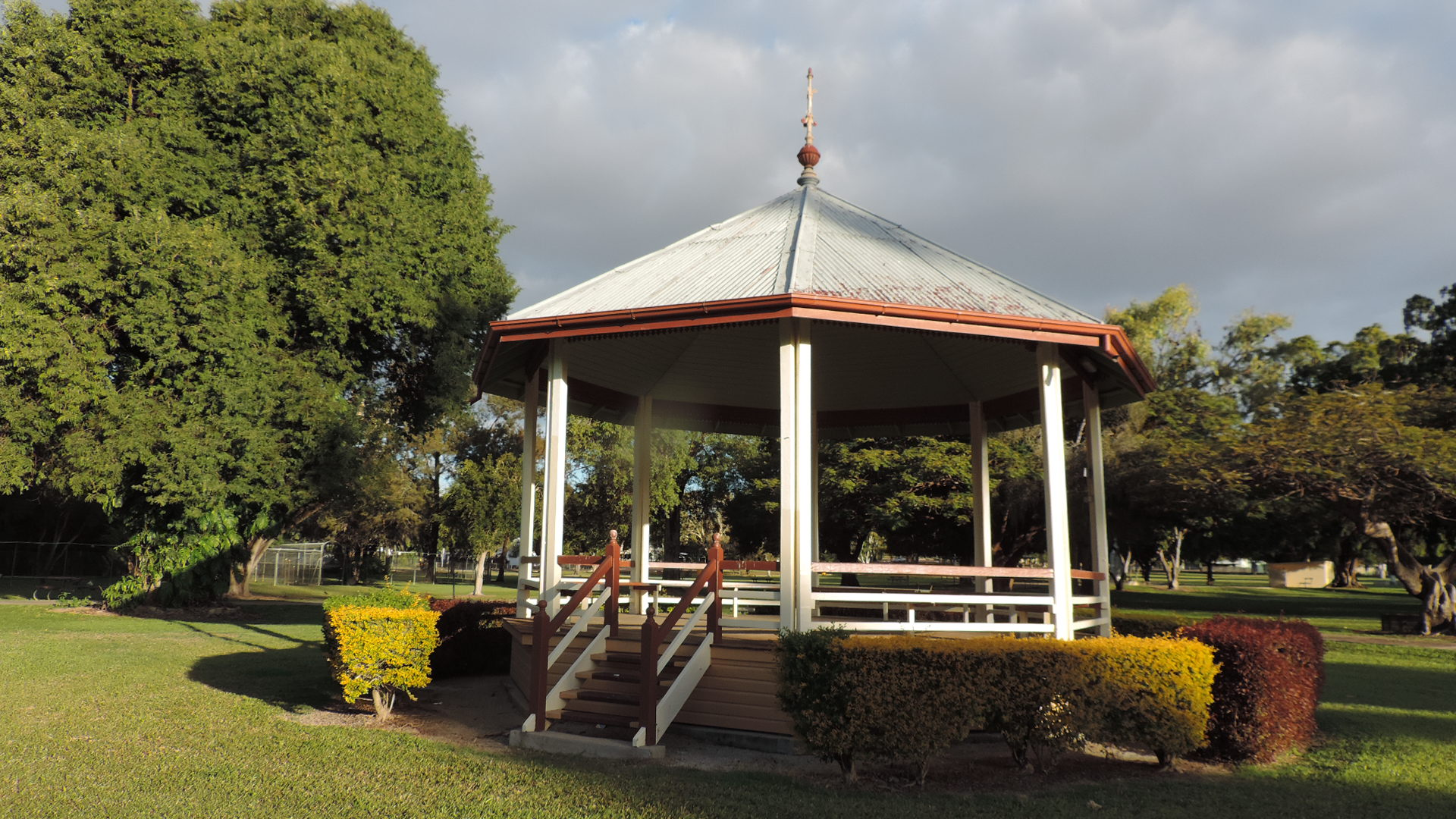
Bandstand, Lissner Park, 2016

Lissner Park is a recreational reserve of some 7 hectares (17 acres). It is bounded by Anne, Church, Plummer, Deane and Bridge Streets, and is located three blocks to the north of Gill Street, the main street of Charters Towers. It is well grassed with a scattering of perimeter trees and remnant avenues, and a collection of structures and enclosures. The structures include the Band Rotunda and the Boer War Veterans Memorial Kiosk. The park is relatively flat, rising gently towards Anne Street to the south.

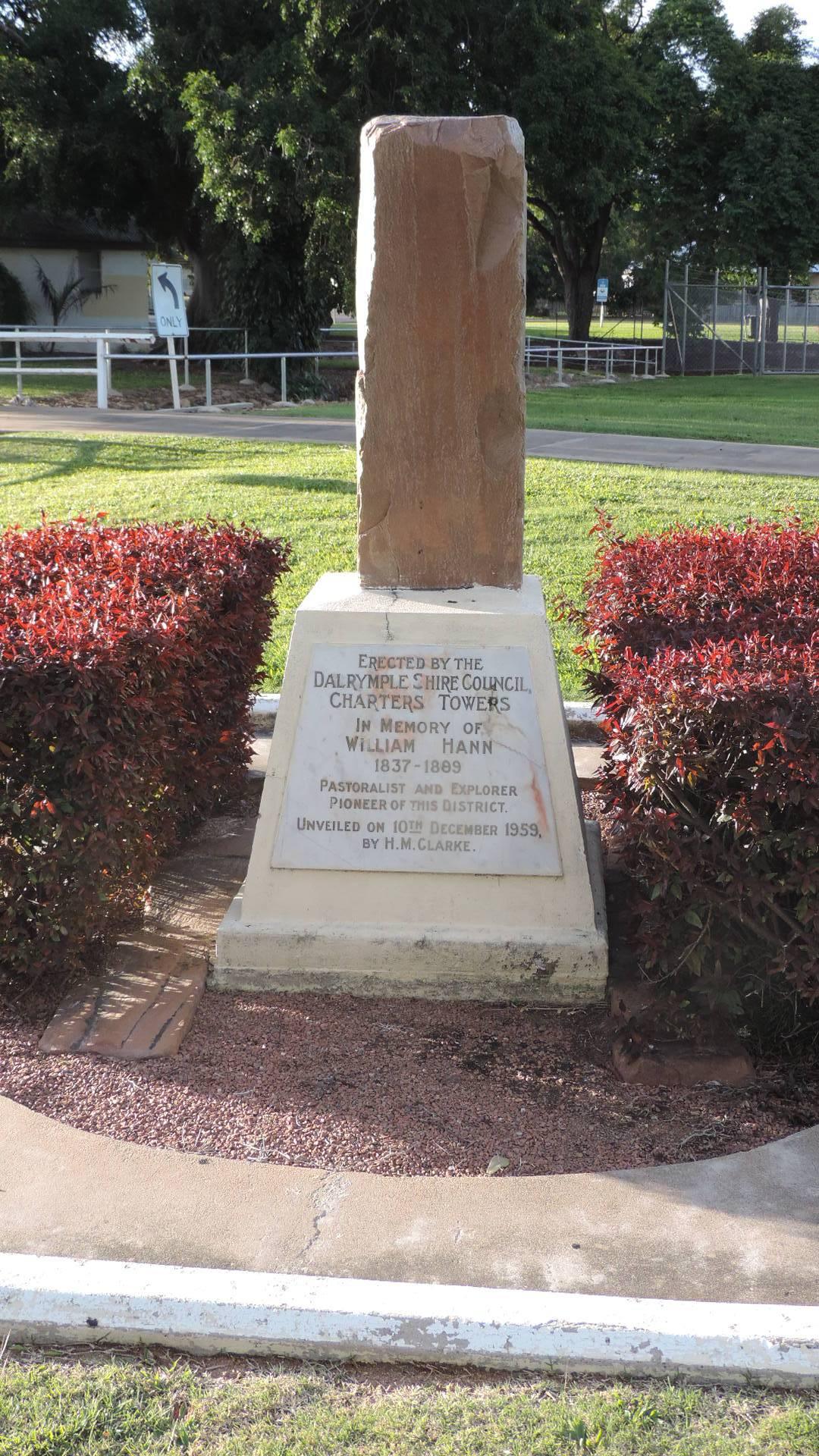
Memorial to William Hann, Lissner Park, 2016

Mosman Creek separates the northern end of the park from the remainder. The central part of the park includes many of the park's structures and several mature trees including large figs. The southern end of the park is grassed, gently sloping and bound by perimeter trees. There is some remnants of a central axis formed by structures and planting. The trees within the park include figs, jacarandas, eucalypts, tamarinds, palms and silky oaks.

The Band Rotunda is located on the central axis of the park towards Mosman Creek. It is octagonal in plan with a corrugated iron pyramid roof and cast iron finial. Constructed in timber, it has posts paired at each corner and a cast-iron fringe between. The chamferboard base is largely hidden by a small hedge. The structure is encircled by palm trees, and nearby are several large fig trees.

At the boundary to the west of the bandstand, are wrought iron gates with gate posts and some cast-iron fence posts.

Further to the south of the bandstand, and also on the central axis is the remnant of the fountain. It is encircled by a ring of trees and a small bougainvillea hedge. The fountain is raised on a small platform, bound by a low concrete retaining wall with a moulded top. The fountain has a crucifix form in plan, is constructed from folded "tin" sheets, and exhibits evidence of removed decorative elements.

Other elements of the park include a playground, the 1959 memorial to William Hann, the 1988 fernery, the 1988 animal enclosure and the 1972 Rotary centenary pond.

Traversing the park, Mosman Creek is now lined with stone and concrete, and is crossed by two timber and steel footbridges. Across the creek two animal enclosures with some emus and a kangaroo. In the north-eastern corner is the Kennedy Regiment Memorial Swimming Pool which is not part of the park.

=== Boer War Veterans Memorial Kiosk ===
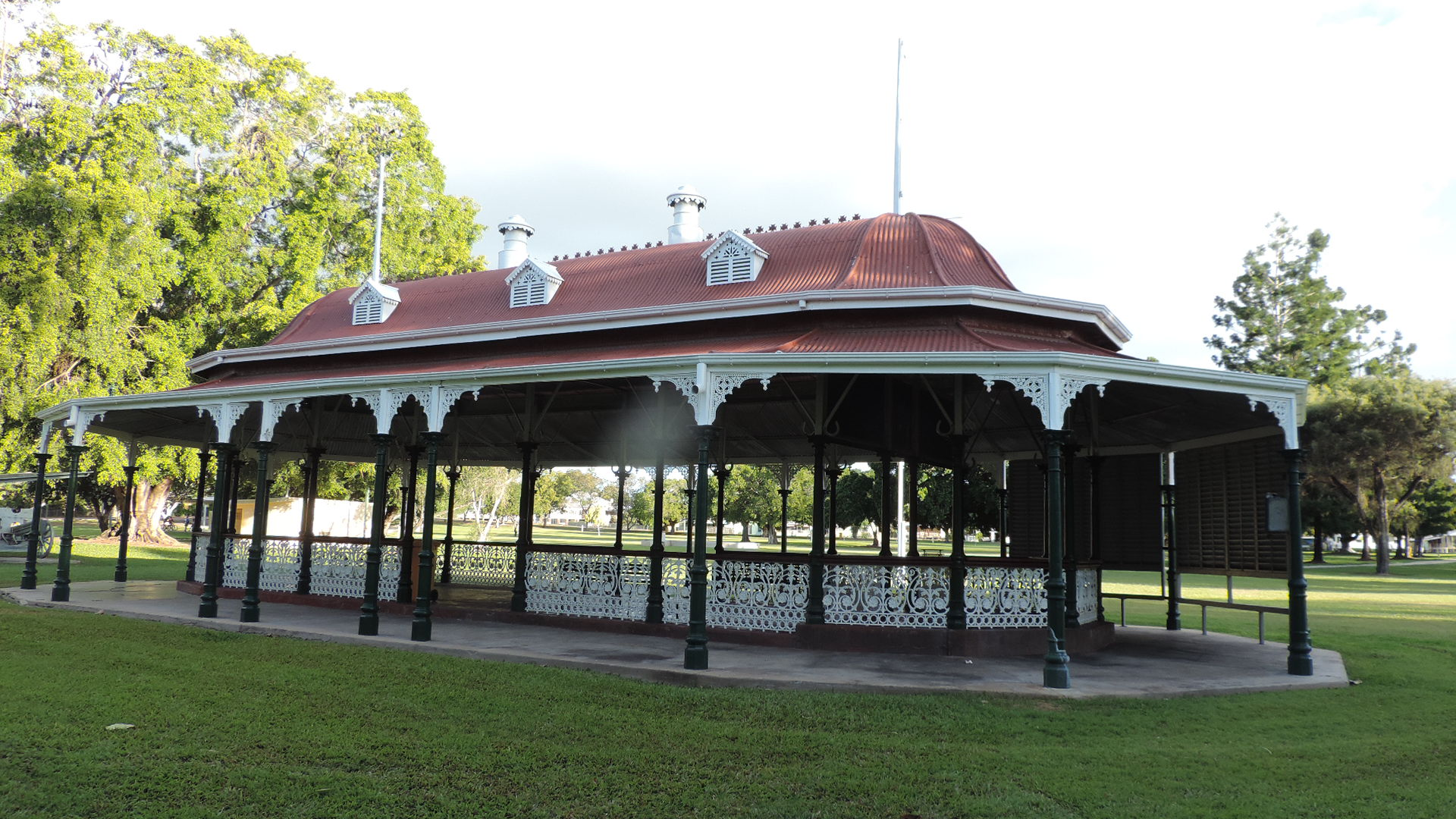
Boer War Veterans Memorial Kiosk, 2016

Standing to the west of the fountain is the Boer War Veterans Memorial Kiosk. It lies on an east-west axis, with both ends semicircular in plan, and is constructed in cast iron and steel.

The kiosk is an open structure, with an inner and outer ring of cast iron columns with Corinthian capitals. These support the red bellcast corrugated iron roof and encircling concave verandah. The roof is punctuated with three small louvred dormers to each side, and has ridge ventilators, cast iron cresting and flagstaffs at each end.

The outer ring of columns have cast-iron brackets. To the south-western corner are panels of timber louvres between the columns.

Raised one step on a concrete plinth is the inner ring of columns. Running between these is a cast-iron balustrade. Above is a series of steel struts providing the bracing.

At the western end of the kiosk, behind the louvres is a servery with marble benches. Above the benches are three marble plaques facing east, with gilded lettering naming some eighty local soldiers who served in the Boer War. Facing the kiosk at the eastern end are two canons.

== Heritage listing ==
Boer War Veterans Memorial Kiosk and Lissner Park was listed on the Queensland Heritage Register on 21 October 1992 having satisfied the following criteria.

The place is important in demonstrating the evolution or pattern of Queensland's history.

The Boer War Veterans Memorial Kiosk, constructed in 1909, is significant because it exemplifies a widespread social movement expressing Australian patriotism and nationalism during the early twentieth century and belongs to a class of commemorative memorials which record local community response to events such as war.

The place is important in demonstrating the principal characteristics of a particular class of cultural places.

The Boer War Veterans Memorial Kiosk, constructed in 1909, is significant because it exemplifies a widespread social movement expressing Australian patriotism and nationalism during the early twentieth century and belongs to a class of commemorative memorials which record local community response to events such as war.

The place is important because of its aesthetic significance.

Lissner Park has retained its fine Victorian character as a result of the survival of many of the trees supplied by Ben Gulliver, Townsville nurseryman and botanist.

The place has a strong or special association with a particular community or cultural group for social, cultural or spiritual reasons.

The park has been a focus for community cultural and social activities since its inception and was the venue for commemorative events and for political gatherings during the turbulent years of the rise of the Labor Party during the last decade of the nineteenth century.

The place has a special association with the life or work of a particular person, group or organisation of importance in Queensland's history.

Lissner Park, named after Queensland MLA and local businessman Isidor Lissner, is important as the earliest recreation venue in Charters Towers. The park, developed as a response to the prevailing belief that gardens improved the moral character and enhanced the social well being of the community, was established with the support of Lissner.
