= W G Smith & Sons =

Australian architecture firm

W G Smith & Sons was an architecture firm headquartered in Townsville, Queensland, Australia. Some of their works are heritage-listed.

== History ==
William George Smith was born in London and arrived in Brisbane in 1861, initially working as a carpenter and joiner. By 1869 he was a building contractor in Maryborough. In 1875, he became a foreman for the Queensland Department of Public Works and was transferred to Townsville in this capacity in 1879. In 1886, he left the department to join his son, W.G. Smith Junior, who was already in practice as an architect in Townsville. In time they were joined by Smith's other sons; Charles, Frederick and George. The firm had branch offices in Charters Towers, Mackay and Cairns. The firm continued in business until 1910.

William George Smith (junior) died on 15 May 1910 aged 46 years in Mareeba, Queensland.

William George Smith (senior) died on 9 November 1917 aged 83 years at "Glenwood", Bismarck Street, Clayfield, Brisbane.

== Significant works ==
Their significant works include:

- Townsville Town Hall
- Townsville Market Reserve Buildings
- Osler House (their only known example of domestic work)
