= Lucy Hunter Blackburn =

Scottish writer

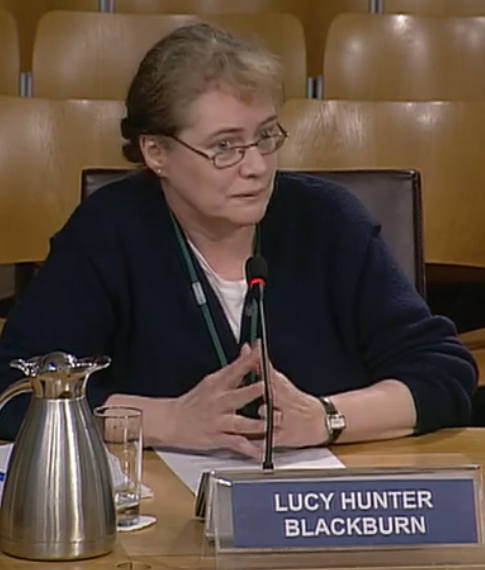
- Speaking in Scottish Parliament in 2018
- Education: University of Edinburgh
- Occupations: Researcher and writer
- Employer: Murray Blackburn Mackenzie

Lucy Hunter Blackburn is a researcher and writer working in Scotland. She co-founded the policy group Murray Blackburn Mackenzie, which focuses on data collection for evidence-based analysis, transparency in government and women's "sex-based rights" in areas of public policy. Prior to that, she was the head of the Scottish Government's higher education division.

== Education ==
Blackburn has a degree in modern history, master's degrees in political philosophy and in educational research, and a 2021 PhD in student finance from the University of Edinburgh. Her doctoral thesis looked at the effect of each government's funding on the inequality facing students in Scotland and Wales.

== Career ==
Blackburn began her career focused on higher education and student finance. She led the Scottish Government's higher education division. She focused on student support in Scotland from 2013 to 2020, during which time she wrote the Adventures in Evidence blog. In 2017 the higher education website WonkHE established its own awards sponsored by supporters of higher education, and chose Blackburn as their inaugural "Wonk of the Year" for her "must-read" commentary about the funding of Scottish higher education. She was also ranked in the top forty on WonkHE's "Power list" for that year.

In 2018, Blackburn, Kath Murray, and Lisa Mackenzie co-founded the policy group Murray Blackburn Mackenzie, which focuses on women's rights which are based on their sex, and gender self-identification in areas of public policy, areas for which Blackburn has focused her recent research, to establish an evidence base. She has been critical of what she describes as flawed data that leads to incorrect assumptions about transgender youth, and of hate crime bills she says lead to silencing of gender-critical feminist voices, arguing that transgender-rights advocates failed to consider how allowing people to self identify their gender might impact other groups. Together Murray Blackburn Mackenzie have highlighted concerns about equality issues concerning the higher education workforce, including reviews of Advance HE's Athena SWAN programme arguing the need to review its "gender as a spectrum" approach and the impact that has on women's progression in the workplace.

Blackburn has written about the treatment of women in the Scottish criminal justice and prisons system, highlighting the vulnerability and trauma of women prisoners, gender-based re-offense statistics, and confusion around relevant human rights policy.

Blackburn is the co-editor with Susan Dalgety of a book of essays called The Women who Wouldn't Wheesht, which aimed to record the experiences of women who campaigned in Scotland to prioritise women's rights based on biological sex in the run up to the Supreme Court ruling ruling against the Scottish Government.The book was a bestseller and attracted press attention when in 2025 the National Library of Scotland (NLS) removed and then returned it to their "Dear Library" centenary exhibition of books nominated by members of the public. Dalgety and Blackburn met with Aminah Shah and NLS Chair Sir Drummond Bone to discuss the return.

Blackburn writes and speaks about issues in Scottish higher education, particularly on areas of fairness, funding and devolution. She provides expert and opinion pieces published by The Higher Education Policy Institute (HEPI), Holyrood Magazine, Times Higher Education Supplement, Scottish Affairs, WonkHE, The Critic, and The Spectator.

== Selected publications ==
- Dalgety, Susan; Blackburn, Lucy Hunter, eds. (2024). The Women Who Wouldn't Wheesht. Constable & Robinson. ISBN 978-1-4087-2070-7.
- Murray, Kath; Hunter Blackburn, Lucy (2019). "Losing sight of women's rights: the unregulated introduction of gender self-identification as a case study of policy capture in Scotland" (PDF). Scottish Affairs. 28 (3): 262–289. doi:10.3366/scot.2019.0284. hdl:20.500.11820/2016d817-a978-4f1a-8982-3459b9c05fed.
- Blackburn, Lucy Hunter (February 2015). Whose to Lose? Citizens, institutions and the ownership of higher education funding in a devolved UK (PDF) (Report). Oxford, UK: Higher Education Policy Institute. ISBN 978-1-905315-26-0.
