= Dalgety =

Dalgety may refer to:

- Dalgety, New South Wales, a town in the Monaro Region of New South Wales, Australia
- Dalgety Bay, a town in Fife, Scotland
- Dalgety plc, a former Australian pastoral company and British trading company
  - Dalgety Offices, Townsville, a heritage-listed building built by Dalgety and Company in Queensland, Australia
- Dalgety (surname), surname list
