= The Women Who Wouldn't Wheesht =

2024 book edited by Susan Dalgety and Lucy Hunter Blackburn

The Women Who Wouldn't Wheesht: Voices from the front-line of Scotland's battle for women's rights
- Editor: Susan Dalgety and Lucy Hunter Blackburn
- Language: English
- Subject: Feminism
- Publisher: Constable
- Publication date: May 2024
- Publication place: United Kingdom
- Media type: Print (hardcover)
- ISBN: 978-1-40872-070-7

The Women Who Wouldn't Wheesht: Voices from the front-line of Scotland's battle for women's rights is a 2024 book of gender-critical essays, edited by Susan Dalgety, a columnist for The Scotsman, and Lucy Hunter Blackburn, author and former Scottish Government civil servant. The book was published on 30 May by Constable, an imprint of the Little, Brown Book Group.

In a tweet about the book, J. K. Rowling explained to non-Scots that the meaning of the word wheesht is to 'be quiet' or 'hush up', adding "but I suspect you could have worked that out from the context".

== Summary ==
The publisher describes The Women Who Wouldn't Wheesht as "the story of women who risked their job, reputation, even the bonds of family and friendship, to make their voices heard, and ended up – unexpectedly – contributing to the downfall of Nicola Sturgeon, Scotland's first woman first minister."

The book consists of over 30 essays. Essayists include Dalgety, Hunter Blackburn and Rowling alongside MP Joanna Cherry, MSPs Ash Regan, Joan McAlpine, Johann Lamont, Pam Gosal, and Rachel Hamilton, health campaigner Elaine Miller, writers Kathleen Stock and Jenny Lindsay, researcher Sarah Pedersen, higher education leader Ann Henderson and former prison governor Rhona Hotchkiss.

In her contribution to the book, excerpts of which were published in advance in The Times, Rowling describes her gender-critical beliefs, noting: "I'd come to believe that the socio-political movement insisting 'trans women are women' was neither kind nor tolerant, but in fact profoundly misogynistic, regressive, dangerous in some of its objectives and nakedly authoritarian in its tactics".

Writing in The Sunday Times, the editors describe the core of the book in the words "I won't be forced to say women's bodies don't matter — aren't matter", which they attribute to the anonymous X account @Dis_Critic, the origin of the hashtag #WomenWontWheesht.

== Reception ==
The Women Who Wouldn't Wheesht debuted at number 3 on The Sunday Times list of bestselling general hardbacks.

In The Times, Sarah Ditum begins her review with a quote from the book, "Scotland is the land of the Enlightenment but also the witch craze", which she says explains why the country's establishment adopted trans activism. The book, she says, describes a feminist "fightback through the voices of the women who made it happen".

In the Morning Star, John McInnally describes the essays as being of "major historical, political and social significance", and says that they expose what he calls "gender ideology" as being "regressive and reactionary". He further notes that "the voices in this book are of left-of-centre women" and that "each essay rings with that limpid articulacy of truth, defiance, and conviction that defines a movement built by these and many other women in defence of their hard-won sex-based rights".

In PinkNews, India Willoughby described the book as gender-critical and criticised the bookseller Waterstones for including it in a list of new books, given that Waterstones is "famously trans-supportive". In response, Waterstones said the list was a "broad overview reflective of new publishing across genres and subjects".

For Belle Caledonia, Gemma Clark said that many of the contributors have "significant political power and influence" and considered that the book framed the Scottish anti-gender movement in a disingenuous manner as unfairly maligned, given it was "in lockstep with a well-funded, global anti-gender movement".

The book gained widespread attention in August 2025 amid a controversy over whether or not it should be featured and displayed as part of the "Dear Library" exhibition established by the National Library of Scotland during celebrations of its centenary year. It originally met the conditions for inclusion in the display but following complaints raised by the Library's LGBT staff network, the book was removed from the exhibition, though it was still available to read in the library. A spokeswoman for the library confirmed that the decision had not been taken because of "the content of the book itself or the views expressed". The book was reinstated following talks between the national librarian, Amina Shah chairman of the library board Sir Drummond Bone, and the book's editors An independent review found that the decision to exclude the book had been based on "inadequate evidence".
