= Townsville State Government Offices =

Townsville State Government Offices may refer to:

- Townsville State Government Offices (Flinders Street)
- Townsville State Government Offices (Wickham Street)
