= Fibis =

Fibis or FIBIS may refer to:

- Families In British India Society (FIBIS), a genealogical organisation
- Fibiș, a commune in Timiș County, Romania
- FIBiS (Italian Federation of Billiard Sport), organizer of the World Five-pins Championship
