= Commonwealth Bank Building, Townsville =

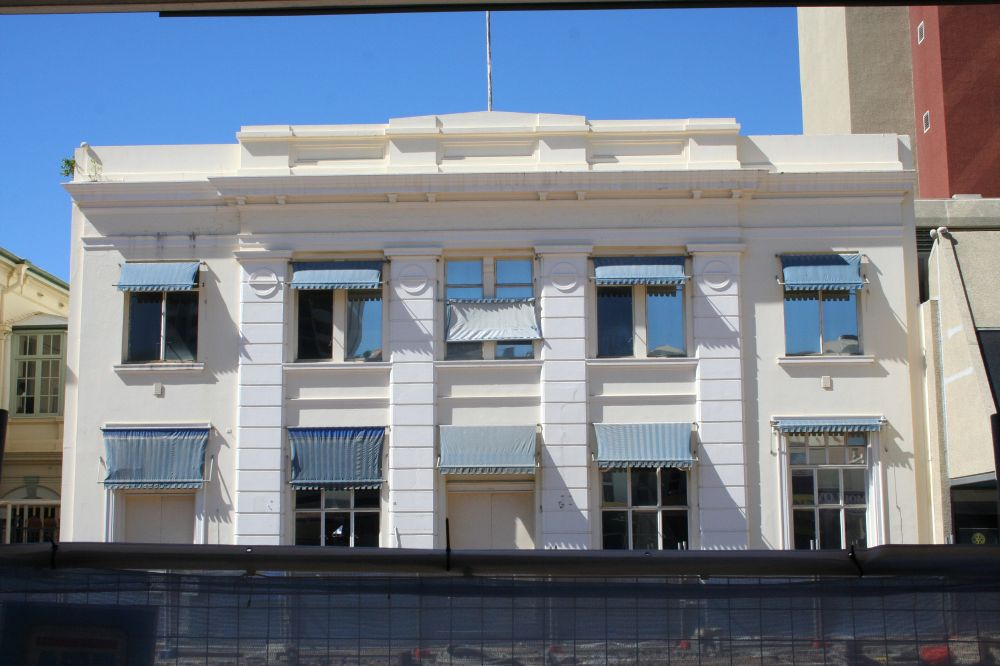
- Former Commonwealth Bank building, Townsville

- Location within Queensland
- 19.2588°S 146.8181°E
- Location: 272–278 Flinders Street, Townsville, Queensland, Australia

History
- Design period: 1919–1930s (interwar period)
- Built: 1923

Site notes
- Architect(s): John and Herwald Kirkpatrick
- Architectural style: Classicism

Queensland Heritage Register
- Official name: Commonwealth Bank of Australia (former), Commonwealth Savings Bank, Townsville City Council Library
- Type: state heritage (built)
- Designated: 29 October 2004
- Reference no.: 602471
- Significant period: 1920s (fabric); 1924–1977 (historical use as a bank)
- Significant components: flagpole/flagstaff, banking chamber
- Builders: Charles Hanson & Sons

Commonwealth Bank Building is a heritage-listed former bank building at 272–278 Flinders Street, Townsville, Queensland, Australia. It was designed by John and Herwald Kirkpatrick and built in 1923 by Charles Hanson & Sons. It is also known as Commonwealth Savings Bank and Townsville City Council Library. It was added to the Queensland Heritage Register on 29 October 2004.

== History ==
The former Commonwealth Bank building, the third premises but first purpose-built Townsville Commonwealth Bank building, was constructed in 1923 at a cost of approximately £30,000. The building was designed by Sydney architect and consultant engineering firm John and Herwald Kirkpatrick and constructed by Townsville builders Charles Hanson and Sons under the supervision of Townsville architect Walter Hunt.

The federal government's Commonwealth Bank Act 1911 established Australia's first bank empowered to conduct both savings and general (trading) bank business with the security of a federal government guarantee. On 16 September 1912 the Commonwealth Government established the Commonwealth Bank of Australia. By 20 January 1913 the general business of the Bank had commenced in Canberra, in the six state capitals, in London and in Townsville. The Townsville office was the first country branch established in Australia.

Initially the Bank operated from leased premises opposite the future site of the new building. However, following the amalgamation the Commonwealth Bank with the Queensland Government Savings Bank (QGSB) on 7 December 1920 the Bank moved its operations into the leased premises of the former QGSB near the corner of Stanley and Flinders Street. The Commonwealth Bank then purchased this property. In 1922 the site was sold to the Queensland State Government Insurance Office (now the site of the 1928 Queensland State Government Building). It is not known how long the Bank stayed in this location but it is possible it remained until 1924 when the new building was completed.

In the meantime the Commonwealth Bank purchased an allotment for £5000 in Flinders Street adjacent to the Post Office. This land was first issued as a Deed of Grant in November 1922 to the State Advances Corporation. Three months later, in February 1923, the land was sold to the Commonwealth Bank of Australia.

Sydney architect and consultant engineering firm John and Herwald Kirkpatrick, designers of a number of early Commonwealth Bank buildings including the head office in Sydney, the Melbourne, Canberra and London offices, were commissioned to draw up plans for a new building in Townsville. John Kirkpatrick, appointed architect for the Commonwealth Bank in 1912, was a friend of and cousin to the Governor of the Bank, Denison Samuel King Miller. The Kirkpatrick architectural firm remained architects for the Commonwealth Bank for at least ten years. During that time bank buildings were constructed throughout Australia, the Pacific and England.

This first purpose built Commonwealth Bank building in Townsville was constructed of reinforced concrete and brick. It is one of the earliest, if not the earliest surviving reinforced concrete multi storey building in Townsville. The supervising architect for the construction of the building, Walter Hunt, was an innovator in the use of reinforced concrete. At that time he was also designing the Dalgety & Company Building completed in Sturt Street, Townsville in December 1924.

Townsville building firm Charles Hanson and Sons secured the tender to erect the new two storied brick and reinforced concrete Commonwealth Bank building. By August 1923 the first floor walls were almost completed and the floor beams were being filled in with concrete. The builders had installed an electric dynamo to facilitate the easier handling and hauling of mixed concrete to the first floor level.

In September 1923 the Queensland Architects and Builders Journal (A&B Journal) reported that the "first floor is laid and the columns to carry the flat roof are being filled. The framings of the beams of the first floor are now being removed and it is the contractors intention to commence plastering shortly". The flat roof was made of concrete with a parapet wall.

Sub contractors Harvey & Clarke, who specialized in joinery and shopfitting, carried out the joinery work.

By February 1924 the A&B Journal reported that "... the Commonwealth Bank was housed in recently completed premises". The building occupied a quarter acre block and accommodated the banking institution on the ground floor with the offices of the Deputy Public Curator on the first floor.

The ground floor entrance led to a vestibule, to the left of which was the manager's room. The building consisted of a two storey high banking chamber, complete with tellers and a strong room. At the rear of the building were the resident officer's room, gentlemen's lavatory and cloakroom and a ladies lavatory. A flight of stairs in the vestibule led to an upstairs landing which accommodated a cleaner's room and additional male and female lavatories at the rear. The building was said to be well lit.

On 2 February 1924 the Townsville Evening Star reported on the "... near completion of the most attractive and up to date premises in the city ... the building ... is the architecture of Messers. John and Herwald G Kirkpatrick, architects and consultant engineers, Sydney". The report said that the building was constructed on "... most modern lines, reinforced concrete being principally used, while many new features to the building trade of the North have been introduced". These new features included ventilation and lighting, and ornate plaster work on the ceilings and substantial pillars in the banking chamber. A strong room was built behind the banking chamber. It was thought to be the largest in the north and was reinforced with steel railway rails. A Montgomerie Neilsen Oxidising nonseptic toilet system was installed with a large brick tank under the building. The special windows, which appear to be similar to those installed in the Sydney Head Office building, were special Simplex patented steel framed windows which adjusted to any angle. The building was electrically wired and had fans throughout and was constructed to allow the addition of two further floors. Thirty five massive concrete foundation pillars set up to 35 feet (11 m) into the soil supported the structure. There was a clearance of six feet at the rear to about three feet on Flinders Street. The rear entrance was made secure with the installation of a "Chubb" door.

Although, in the February 1924 issue of the Architects and Builders Journal, it was reported that "... the Commonwealth Bank was housed in recently completed premises" the Commonwealth Bank Archives has written a brief history of the Townsville Branch saying the new building was opened on 14 July 1924. No reference has been supplied for the 14 July 1924 opening date. The February opening date makes this the first country branch to occupy its own, purpose built office. However, if the Townsville branch opened in July then the Newcastle Branch was the first branch to open on 5 May 1924.

During World War II the Commonwealth Bank, including the Townsville Branch, became heavily involved with Commonwealth War Bonds and other forms of government fund raising activities, as well as acting as local agents for the meat and clothes rationing authorities.

Despite the financial constraints of wartime the banking chamber was refurbished in 1944. However, in the mid 1950s the thirty year old premises needed further maintenance work. Dilapidated counters and fittings required replacement, lighting needed upgrading, painting of the interior was necessary and new coverings for the floors. Consideration was also given to constructing a third floor on the building to serve as bachelor quarters. However, the whole project was deferred until 1954 when tenders were called but deferred again because of cost. In 1957 new plans were drawn up for extensive alterations and additions, including a new Teller line, installation of fluorescent lighting, painting, linoleum tiles to walls and floor, new staff amenities and storage area, new entrance doors and removal of the portico over the front door.

The work was carried out by Brisbane builders N Kratzmann Pty Ltd at a cost of £54,283/15/2 and was completed in May 1959.

During the late 1940s and 1950s the Commonwealth Bank expanded its activities Australia wide, opening hundreds of branches and agencies to cater for the increase and spread of population accompanying Australia's great post war migration influx, and reflecting the buoyant national economy of the 1950s. In December 1959 the Commonwealth Bank of Australia was restructured and renamed the Commonwealth Banking Corporation.

To meet the needs of the expanding commercial centre and to overcome crowding in the branch building a sub-branch was opened at 471–473 Flinders Street in a twenty year old brick and concrete building. This sub branch became a full branch on 27 November 1967.

By 1967 staff numbers in the main bank in Flinders Street had reached 64. Existing facilities were inadequate with no storage space and no space for interview rooms. By 1969 plans for a new building were in place. A property 800 metres (2,600 ft) west along Flinders Street was purchased for £269,000. The new four storied building with a tower block of a further 14 floors was designed by Townsville architects Martin Dillon and Associates and constructed by Townsville builders JM Kelly (Builders) Pty Ltd in 1975. At the time of construction the Branch had reached 111 staff, making it "... the largest branch, apart from the capital cities ... in Australia". Operations transferred to the new premises on 10 October 1977.

The 1923 Commonwealth Bank property was subsequently exchanged for three blocks of vacant land owned by the Townsville City Council in Alfred Street, Aitkenvale where a branch of the bank was later built.

In 1978 the Townsville City Council established the Council Library in the former Commonwealth Bank building. The library continued to operate from the building until 2003 when it was moved next door into the Northtown Building.

The Townsville City Council sold the building to Aranda Park Pty Ltd in 1990 but continued to lease the property until the Library moved in 2003.

As of March 2016, the building is being offered for sale.

== Description ==
The former Commonwealth Bank of Australia, Townsville is a two-storey reinforced concrete structure with reinforced concrete floors and flat roof with frontage to Flinders Street and also runs through to Ogden Street at the rear. The frontage was designed with five bays, the middle three projected slightly forward with four columns of a singular banded design flanking the three emphasised bays. These four columns have design similarity to columns of the bank's Sydney head office building though in render rather than stone. The columns have ovolo-moulded edges and the banding appears as strongly expressed recessed joints. A suggestion of art deco appears in the circular motif decoration below the top of the columns.

Windows to the building are steel framed, rectangular with the larger sashes casement and the upper sashes pivot hung. A plinth, originally plastered but now veneered in grey granite, to window sill height runs across the width of the building interrupted by two doorways. The main doorway into the former banking chamber is centrally located with a second doorway in the northern bay leading to the stairs for first floor access. The main doorway was originally flanked by two plain pilasters with entablature over that have been removed and the adjoining columns completed. The window frames either side of the main doorway incorporate an arched transom between the casements and smaller upper panes and sashes.

The two side bays of the frontage were finished as face brickwork panels initially but later were rendered over and painted. A classical cornice across the building at roof level projects forward over the three central bays and has pairs of dentils above the columns. Below the central cornice section there remains indications of the lettering of the bank signage incompletely chiselled off. Over the cornice is a panelled parapet forming a low simple pediment centrally with a tapered flagpole fixed behind.

Behind the street frontages the first floor of the building is set back from the northern boundary to gain natural light. The two-storeyed rear elevation to Ogden Street is plain and utilitarian without the decorative expression and composition of the front elevation. The rear and visible side walls are of painted render. Steel windows sizes vary according to use and plumbing is externally mounted. A single door, with roller shutter, allows access to the street.

== Heritage listing ==
The former Commonwealth Bank building was listed on the Queensland Heritage Register on 29 October 2004 having satisfied the following criteria.

The place is important in demonstrating the evolution or pattern of Queensland's history.

The former Commonwealth Bank is important in demonstrating the pattern of Queensland's history as the first purpose built Commonwealth Bank building in Townsville. The construction of this major 1923 building reflects the significant role Townsville, as the leading Australian country branch for over sixty years, played in the establishment and regional development of the Commonwealth Bank.

The place demonstrates rare, uncommon or endangered aspects of Queensland's cultural heritage.

It is thought to be a rare surviving example in North Queensland of the commercial work of the Sydney architect and engineering consultant firm John & Herwald Kirkpatrick who were the first architects to work for the Commonwealth Bank of Australia. Apart from the Townsville office the Kirkpatrick firm designed the head office building in Sydney, the London and Melbourne buildings as well as a number of banks in other state capitals thus establishing a consistent architectural image for the Commonwealth Bank throughout Australia.

The place is important because of its aesthetic significance.

The Bank building is important because of its contribution to the overall historical townscape of the city but particularly to the east Flinders Street area where it is located within a group of buildings including the former Post Office, Perc Tucker Gallery and the former Aplin Brown & Company Building.

The place is important in demonstrating a high degree of creative or technical achievement at a particular period.

The former Commonwealth Bank, built in 1923 using reinforced concrete, is one of the first multi storey buildings constructed in Townsville utilising this early twentieth century innovative technique. It is now a rare surviving example from the early period of use of this technology in Townsville.

The place has a special association with the life or work of a particular person, group or organisation of importance in Queensland's history.

The former Commonwealth Bank, Townsville has a special association with the work of Sydney architect and consultant engineering firm John & Herwald Kirkpatrick and with Townsville architect Walter Hunt who was known for his innovative work in designing reinforced concrete buildings.
