= Susan Dalgety =

Scottish writer and politician

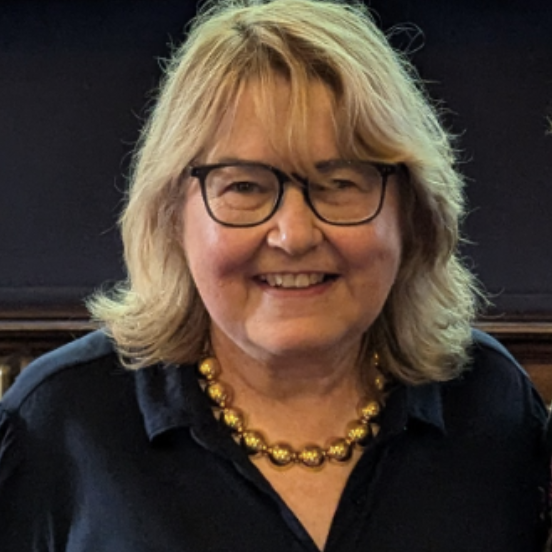
- Occupations: politician and writer
- Writing career
- Subjects: Malawi and gender

Susan Dalgety is a Scottish politician, writer and columnist. She is known for her work about Malawi and gender. She has been an outspoken supporter of Scottish Labour. She is a columnist for The Scotsman and she has created books about Malawi and gender.

== Life ==
Dalgety joined the Labour Party in about 1980 and that was where she met her husband. She came to notice as the head of communication for the Scottish First Minister Jack McConnell. In 2005 she made her first visit to Malawi when she organised the first official visit by the Scottish parliament and that visit was part of a continuing partnership between the two countries.

For seven years she served on Edinburgh City Council rising to be the deputy leader. She became a columnist for The Scotsman.

In 2014 she campaigned for Scotland to remain a part of the UK. She complained about the division that the referendum created and she was thankful when 55% of the vote agreed with her position. In 2018 she announced that she was still a supporter of Labour, but the emergence of Jeremy Corbyn in 2015 meant that she left the Labour party. She enjoys travelling and she and her husband lived in Malawi for six months in 2019. "The Spirit of Malawi" was the resulting book and it included interviews with many Malawian people including the leading journalist Edyth Kambalame and Vice President Chilima.

She and Lucy Hunter Blackburn edited a book about gender. Lucy Hunter Blackburn is a former Scottish civil servant who was in a partnership supported by crowdfunding from 2019. Their book "The Women Who Wouldn't Wheesht" was published and joined the bestseller lists in 2024. It is a book of essays written by influential people, including J. K. Rowling, and it puts forward the case for gender-critical feminism.

At the beginning of 2025 the Scotland Malawi Partnership appointed Professor Jeremy Bagg to succeed Professor Heather Cubie as the chair. The partnership board also agreed the appointment of three voluntary vice chairs. The senior vice-chair was Dalgety. In June 2025 she argued that "Charity doesn’t begin at home", citing the example of Rotary International in Scotland and its international reach.

In 2025, Dalgety and Lucy Hunter Blackburn met National Library of Scotland (NLS) librarian and CEO Amina Shah and the NLS Chair Sir Drummond Bone to discuss the controversy surrounding their best selling book. The NLS had removed and then returned it to their 'Dear Library' centenary exhibition of books which were nominated by members of the public. Dalgety, Blackburn, Shah and Bone confirmed the book's return.

== Private life ==
Dalgety is married.
