= British Association for Cemeteries in South Asia =

BACSA logo

British Association for Cemeteries in South Asia (BACSA) is an organisation founded in 1977 that seeks to maintain and record for posterity European cemeteries in former Indian subcontinent and Southeast Asia territories of the East India Company such as India, Sri Lanka, Burma and Malaysia. It is based in London.

== History ==
The BACSA was founded, in October 1976, by Theon Wilkinson who was a captain in the 3rd Gorkha Rifles during World War II.

== Scope ==
BACSA estimates that two million Europeans are buried in the Indian subcontinent. They provide financial aid to people in these areas who are willing to restore European cemeteries. They state that it is only by the impetus for restoration coming from the local community, that there is a chance that the old cemeteries will survive, and not relapse back into ruin and desolation in a few more years.

== Work ==
As well as facilitating restoration, preservation and maintenance work in cemeteries in South Asia, the organisation supports and publishes books detailing cemetery monumental inscriptions that have been transcribed by members. BACSA also publishes a bi-annual journal, Chowkidar, other works relating to cemeteries and keeps an archive that forms a unique record of over 1,300 cemeteries based on official sources with inscriptions and photographs. Some of these records are published on-line for free searching using the Frontis Archive Publishing System.

== See also ==
- Families In British India Society
- Former cemeteries in Singapore
