= The India Papers =

Archive of documents relating to British India

- Housed at: The National Library of Scotland
- Curators: Curator (Social Sciences)
- Size (no. of items): 4,200+ bound volumes (40,000+ individual reports)
- Website: nls.uk/indiapapers

The India Papers collection is an archive containing roughly 4,200 bound volumes (40,000 individual reports) dated from the post-Mutiny reorganisation of the Indian government up until Indian Independence in 1947 and is essentially a collection of almost all things relating to British India. There are large sections devoted to the state's medical history, human rights, military history, education, industry and trade, travel, politics, religion, arts, and various other subjects. Notable documents in the archive include important documentation concerning eye-witness accounts of the Partition riots and the police reports on Gandhi's political meetings. The rare collection is held at the National Library of Scotland (NLS) in Edinburgh, Scotland. Only one other collection of similar size and content can be found in the UK, the India Office Records, which are held at the British Library in London. The India Papers are complemented further by more the substantial collections in India and in the United States.

== History and acquisition ==
The India Papers consist of documents and other miscellaneous materials spanning from around 1858 to 1947. The collection comprises publications of the central imperial government and of various Indian states, many of which came under British rule.

The National Library of Scotland acquired parts of the India Papers in different ways, though most materials were deposited under a scheme administered by the India Office. Some materials was published in the UK on the Indian government's behalf and so has been acquired under the terms of the Copyright Act, while all other papers were either donated or purchased. There are also composite volumes which were assembled by George Smith and Joseph Owen as well as some books that were acquired as part of the Minto Papers - a collection of papers related to the Elliot family whose 1st Earl, Gilbert Elliot-Murray-Kynynmound, was Governor-General of India (1807 - 1813) and whose 4th Earl, of the same name, was Viceroy (1905 - 1910).

== The Medical History of British India collection ==
The Medical History of British India collection exposes government practices, law and the operation of colonial power in British India in a medical context, with extensive information on colonial medicine accompanied by drawings, maps, graphs, illustrations and photographs. Most of the archive has been digitised by the NLS and so thousands of documents relating to disease, veterinary medicine, public health, and medical research are now available online to the general public. This digitised archive is divided up into six smaller series: Disease, Institutions, Drugs, Veterinary medicine, Mental health, and Vaccination.

=== Disease ===
The disease section of the collection is made up of 51 reports related to disease within India while it was under British rule. These reports are dated from 1868 to 1920. Included here are extensive reports on cholera, the bubonic plague, yellow fever, leprosy, and malaria.

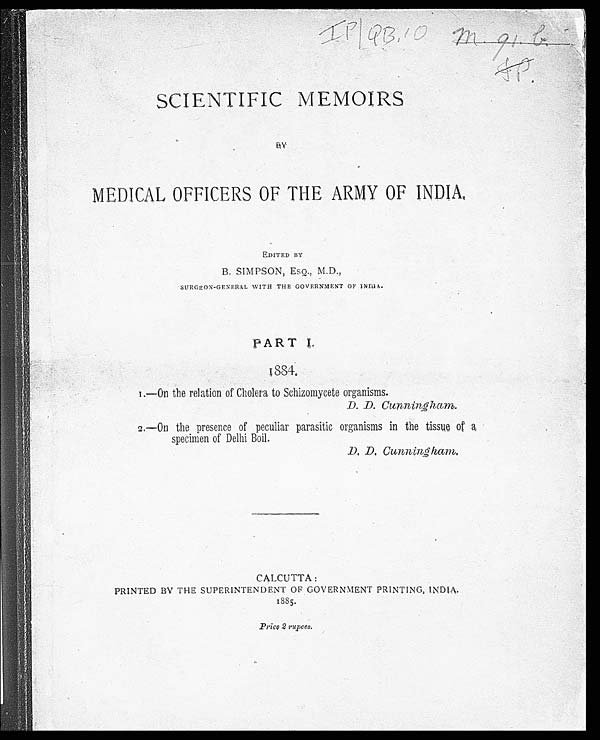
Scientific memoirs of the medical officers of the army of India

=== Institutions ===
There are 106 volumes in this series which has been further divided into three sections: Reports from medical colleges, schools, and research institutions; Army health reports and medical documents; and Lock hospitals.

==== Reports from medical colleges, schools and research institutions ====
There are 13 titles in the first section, including reports on vaccine production, disease outbreaks and public health, some with extensive tables and diagrams which demonstrate patient admission figures and mortality rates. These reports include documents from a wide range of institutions such as asylums, prisons, and police hospitals.

==== Army health reports and medical documents ====
The Army health reports make up 12 of the titles in this section, each describing the health and sanitary conditions of the army in India at the time. Lists of the health details of military personnel from Britain, Europe and India are all kept here. Also included within this section are three volumes of army regulations, as well as 73 separate documents belonging to the Scientific Memoirs series, a medical journal by Indian medical staff.

==== Lock hospitals ====
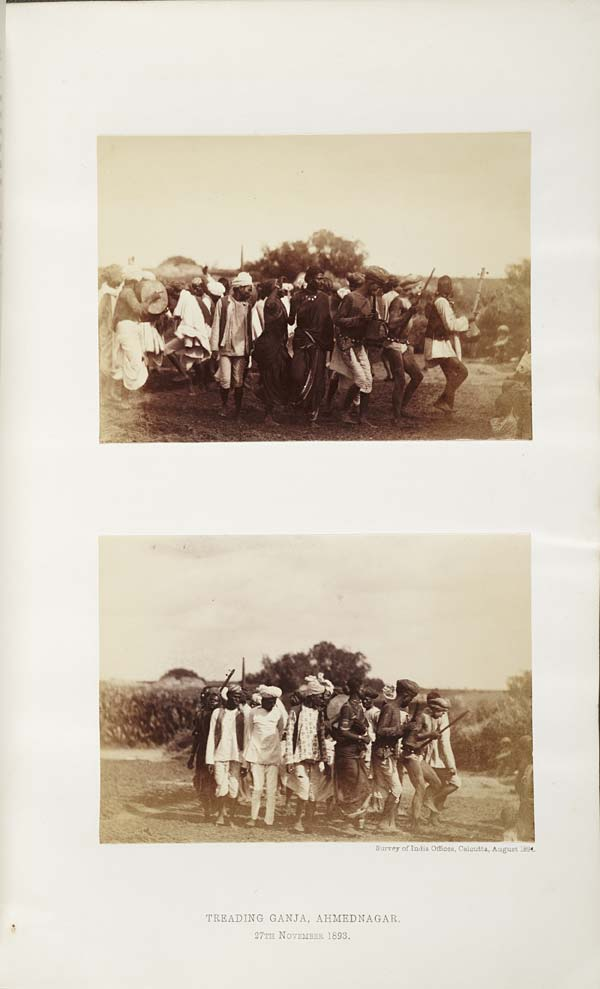
Men treading ganja in Ahmednagar, 1893

This section is made up of five reports describing the treatment and control of venereal disease applied to soldiers and prostitutes from 1873 to 1891. There are tables in the reports which list instances of different venereal diseases, such as syphilis and gonorrhoea, in patients. Of particular note in these reports are the comments made by staff appraising the lock hospital system, as well as various statements exposing imperial attitudes towards women and sex workers. In the context of the period, the government needed to maintain the health of British soldiers as effectively as possible, while also ensuring their basic needs were met. To meet these needs, they provided Indian women as prostitutes, most of whom were forced into it by poverty. to be as healthy as possible, while also ensuring men as healthy. They were seen as a commodity for the army, as valuable as blankets or food, and as such they were regularly checked for disease.

=== Drugs ===
The Drugs collection is made up of nine volumes, dating from 1867 to 1903. It contains reports detailing research on hemp and opium usage in British India, of particular note is the 1893 Indian Hemp Drugs Commission report, as well as information on the cultivation of cinchona trees and reports from the Nilgiris plantation. Research on chloroform anaesthesia can also be found here, as can details about its clinical trials and debates on the safety of the drug.

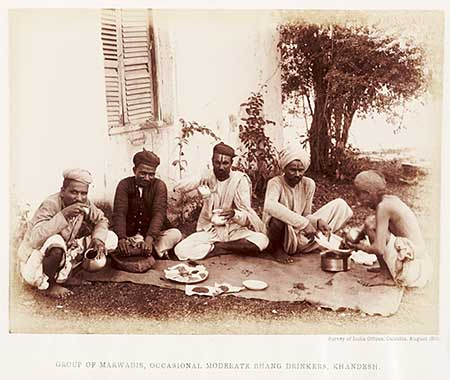
Photo of bhang drinkers, from the Indian Hemp Drugs Commission report, 1893

==== Indian Hemp Drugs Commission report ====
The Hemp Drugs Commission was formed in 1893 following a question posed in the House of Commons regarding hemp production and its use in Bengal, India. The job of the commission was to conduct a thorough investigation into the use of hemp drugs and its effects on physical, mental and moral wellbeing, and is a compilation of the answers to 70 questions asked in 30 cities across India to over 2,000 missionaries, hemp cultivators, traders, medical staff, and military personnel. This report shows the relationship between cannabis users and the government, its questions being indicative of the governments consideration of prohibition and also of its consequences (ie. loss of tax income).

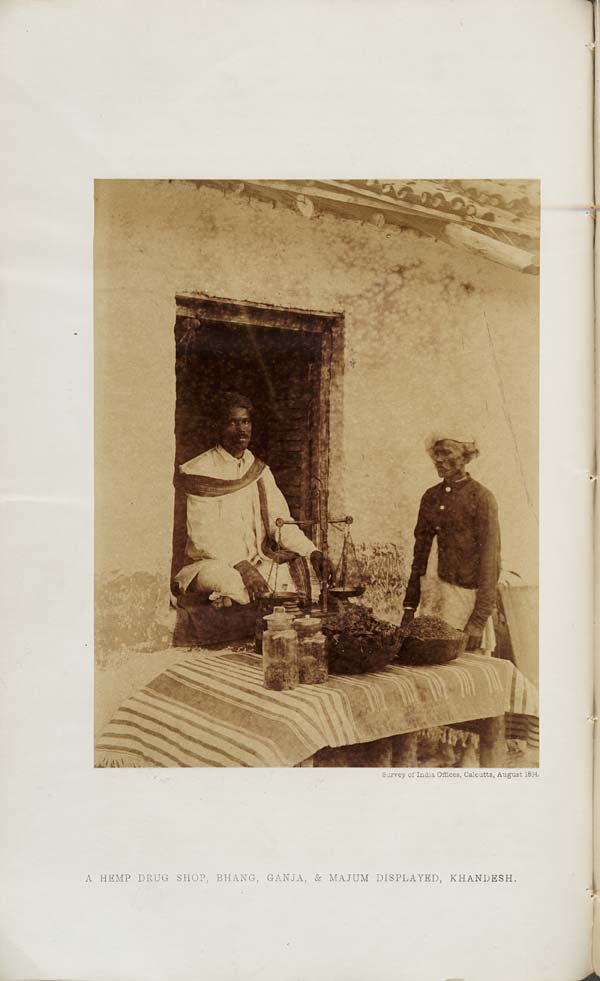
A hemp drug shop in Kandesh, 1894, displaying bhang, ganja and majum

The commission report had controversial findings. Many of those interviewed voiced that cannabis, indigenous to South Asia and deeply rooted in Indian culture and religion, was used for thousands of years prior for the host of nutritional and medicinal benefits that it provided. This, alongside experiments which showed that cannabis benefitted manual labourers on poor diets, meant that the commission eventually decided to control and restrict cannabis with adequate taxation, ensuring cultivators had to obtain licences and also making sure there was a limit on sales and legal possession. The NLS is in possession of the only copy which contains photographs: 16 sepia-toned pictures of the plant, cannabis users, and cannabis traders.

=== Veterinary medicine ===
This section contains 146 volumes dated from 1864 to 1959. It is split into three series: Veterinary diseases, Colleges and laboratories, and Civil Veterinary Departments. The reports consist of extensive medical research relating to trypanosomiasis and rinderpest, and on a more general scale reports showing how veterinary medicine combatted and controlled disease, maintained livestock, and helped to alleviate famine. Of particular note are books about elephant health and disease, as well as much information on husbandry and management of working elephants.

=== Mental health ===
The Mental health collection consists of reports which describe the lunatic asylums and mental hospitals in British India from 1867 to 1948. These reports are significant because they reveal institutional conditions, accounts of violence and disease, and also how people (both native and European) were treated. As well as this, the reports allow for analysis of asylum populations. There are tables, diagrams, and charts within these volumes, each showing changes in the classification of different mental illnesses throughout the period.

=== Vaccination ===
The Vaccination section of the archive is made up of 66 volumes dating from 1856 to 1933. The reports here reveal how vaccination against smallpox was implemented in British India. They reveal the shift from variolation, improved vaccination techniques, and the logistics of lymph supply, as well information on funding and staffing of hospitals and medical practices. They also explore how the local population viewed and resisted western vaccination.
