= Dalgety Offices, Townsville =

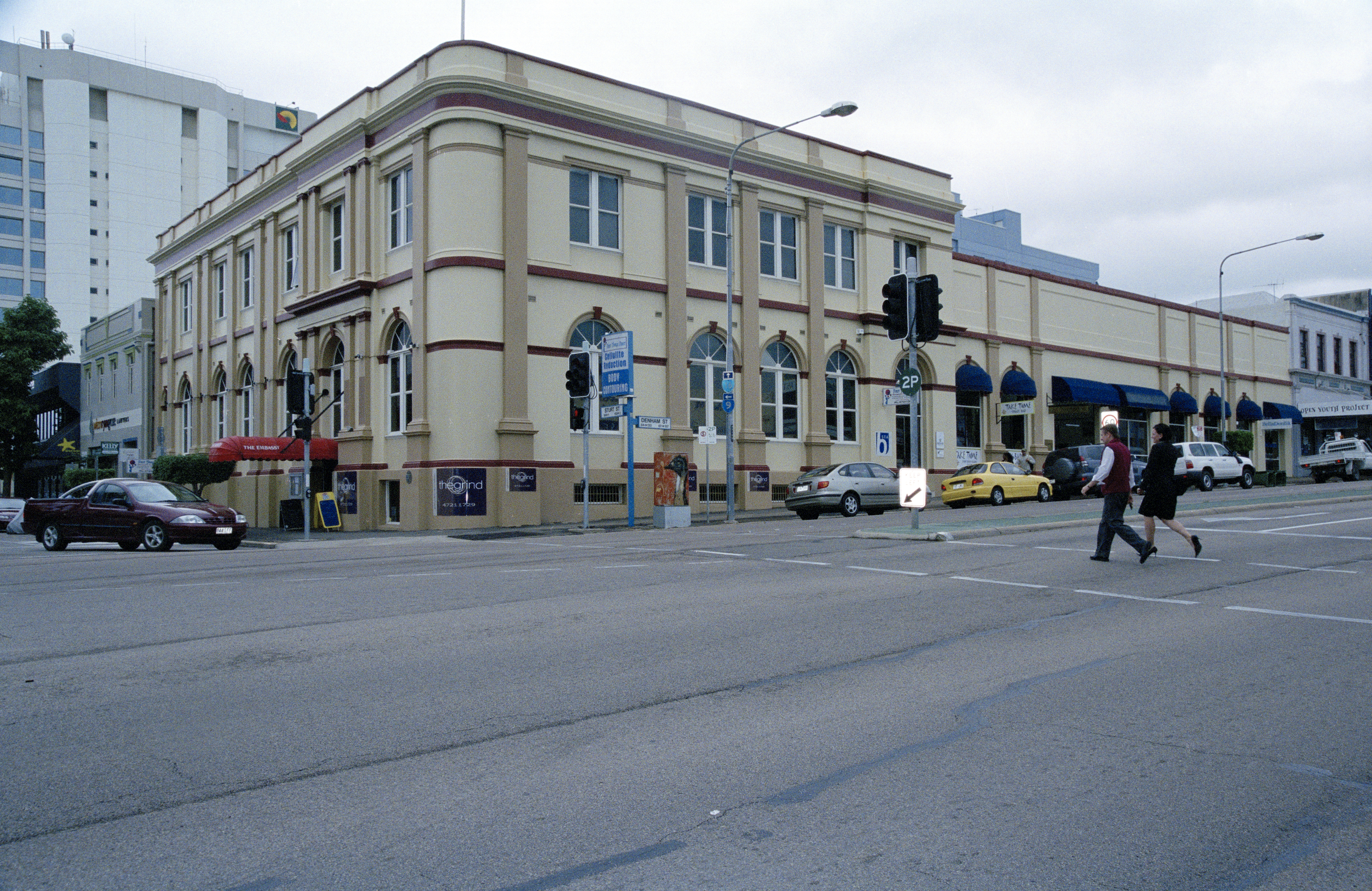
- Former Dalgety Offices, 2005

- Location within Queensland Location within Australia
- 19.2573°S 146.817°E
- Location: 1–13 Sturt Street, Townsville CBD, City of Townsville, Queensland, Australia

History
- Design period: 1919–1930s (interwar period)
- Built: 1923–1925

Site notes
- Architect: Walter Hunt

Queensland Heritage Register
- Official name: Dalgety Offices and former Warehouse frontage, Sunskill House
- Type: state heritage (built)
- Designated: 26 August 2005
- Reference no.: 602520
- Significant period: 1920s (fabric); 1924–1978 (historical use by Dalgetys)
- Significant components: basement / sub-floor, strong room
- Builders: William Hornby Turner

The Dalgety Offices is a heritage-listed office building at 1–13 Sturt Street, Townsville CBD, City of Townsville, Queensland, Australia. It was designed by Walter Hunt and built from 1923 to 1925 by William Hornby Turner. It is also known as Sunskill House. It was added to the Queensland Heritage Register on 26 August 2005.

== History ==
The two-storeyed office section of this large reinforced concrete building was erected for Dalgety & Co. Ltd in 1923–24 and the single-storeyed warehouse, which fronts Denham Street, was constructed in 1924–25. The designer of both sections was prominent local architect Walter Hunt and the contractor was William Hornby Turner. The complex was constructed during a period of economic boom in Queensland and overall rising rural prosperity, despite the collapse of the north Queensland beef export trade in 1921.

In 1846 one of Australia's largest and most successful 19th century pastoral companies was established in Melbourne as Dalgety, Borrodale and Gore. The company flourished during the 1850s gold rushes and in the middle of the decade opened an office in London. In 1859 this became the head office from which the company's various Victorian and, by then, New Zealand interests were controlled. The firm expanded to New South Wales in 1878, to Western Australia in 1889 and South Australia in 1897. The first Queensland office was established at Rockhampton in 1891 in response to the company's heavy involvement in the Central Queensland grazing industry. A branch was established in Brisbane in 1894 and a Townsville branch in 1896. Subsequent Queensland sub-branches were opened in Hughenden, Longreach, Blackall, Charleville and Toowoomba. Dalgety and Co. Ltd. played a significant role in the development of the pastoral industry (particularly through wool brokerage and property investment) in the late 19th and early 20th centuries. It was the single largest supplier to Queensland's first wool sale, conducted in Brisbane in 1898, which contributed to the establishment of Teneriffe in Brisbane as Queensland's principal wool-stores precinct. By the late 1920s, the company was promoting itself as the largest wool-selling house in Australasia.

Dalgety & Co.'s Townsville office and warehouse were housed initially in leased premises in Denham Street, just south of Sturt Street. By 1920, the need for additional accommodation was becoming critical. Dalgety had emerged as a major provisioner to North Queensland pastoralists and farmers and purpose built Townsville premises would consolidate their position. In 1920 Dalgety & Co. acquired title to a site at the northern corner of Denham and Sturt Streets, which had remained vacant since the destruction by fire of the Day Dawn Hotel some twenty years before. The company commissioned Walter Hunt, arguably Townsville's most experienced architect, to prepare plans for new offices and warehouse facilities. Hunt commenced practice in Townsville in 1909 and taught architecture at the Townsville Technical College, maintaining his Townsville practice until retiring to Sydney in 1932. He designed the reinforced concrete St Joseph's Church, Fryer Street, erected in 1920–21 and was in the process of designing the Dalgety & Company building in Sturt Street while he supervised the construction of the Commonwealth Bank Building.

Although tenders for the Dalgety building were called in May 1920, they were difficult to obtain as local contractors feared labour stoppages combined with an increase in the price of building materials. Nothing further was done toward erecting new premises until December 1922 when the board approved that tenders be called for a concrete building. This was delayed until July 1923, anticipating that by then several leading building contractors would be less busy and the competition might be keener. The suggestion of a reinforced concrete rather than brick building was endorsed by the General Manager who remarked that concrete was preferable to brick with an additional advantage that it would be less costly. A long established Townsville builder, William Hornby Turner, submitted the lowest tender with a price of £15,938. Building commenced on 1 August 1923. The whole was to be constructed within 12 months, with the offices erected first.

The Dalgety & Co. building was one of the largest reinforced-concrete projects undertaken during Townsville's building boom of the early 1920s. Townsville's two leading architects, Walter Hunt and CV Rees, designed a substantial number of reinforced-concrete buildings for Townsville and other areas of northern Queensland in the early 1920s. Some of the larger projects included an engineering works, showrooms, factories and offices. A number of single storeyed shops and offices in reinforced concrete were commissioned including a large residence in Flinders Street for Dr Anton Breinl, Walter Hunt being the architect. As well, many businesses were incorporating reinforced-concrete in remodeled premises. Hunt and Rees encouraged the use of reinforced-concrete as a cheaper and more readily available alternative to brick. At the time building materials in Townsville were significantly higher in price than in the south owing to high transport costs. While it was expected that this would be relieved by the completion of the North Coast railway line to Townsville, face bricks from Brisbane still cost £20 per 1000, thus giving prominence to alternative building materials.

Poor weather and labour materials hindered construction. However, by July 1924 rapid progress was being made with the office block and by October 1924 it was nearing completion. Dalgety's Townsville staff finally moved into their new offices on 1 December 1924, and into the warehouse just prior to 30 June 1925. This was despite the fact that the warehouse was not quite finished.

The new office and warehouse offered a frontage of 93 feet (28 m) to Sturt Street and 165 feet (50 m) to Denham Street. Although the office section was only two-storeys, it gave the appearance of a three-storeyed building, with the ground floor 7 feet (2.1 m) above the Sturt Street pavement at the main entrance. This entrance to the offices had a carved handrail leading up to the first floor. The new building made an imposing contribution to Denham and Sturt Streets and was described in the Architectural and Building Journal of Queensland in October 1924 as being one of the most modern and imposing concrete structures in North Queensland.

The design and choice of material was noted for its cyclone resistance with ample provision made for light, ventilation and modern sanitary arrangements. In particular the ventilators were regarded as a suitable addition to a tropical climate and were a notable feature.

Dalgety & Co Ltd. occupied the ground floor offices and the first floor was leased to two legal firms. The fittings and fixtures in the offices were of paneled silky oak and arctic glass, with the ceilings fitted with fibrolite, a popular new product made of asbestos sheeting. The window fittings were constructed of oak.

The ventilation of the building consisted of special ventilators positioned in both the interior and exterior of the building. The interior walls had vents made out of fibrous plaster and situated between the picture rail and the ceiling whereas the exterior ones were made of louvred galvanized iron. Cornice and base mouldings were kept to a minimal in an endeavour to avoid dust being carried through the ventilation system.

A Montgomerie Neilsen oxidising non-septic toilet system was installed with a large brick tank under the building. This basement was accessed from the rear of the building. Inside the building the toilets were located at the rear of the office on both levels. There were two strong rooms on the first floor for the use of the tenants, and a third strong room on the ground floor for Dalgety & Co. The downstairs strong room was fitted with a protex door. The warehouse when complete had a truck loading dock and vehicle access ramp.

Dalgety & Co.'s Townsville branch offered a range of financial and merchandising services which helped sustain the North Queensland pastoral sector. In 1925–26 the firm advertised as financial, insurance, stock and station and shipping agents; wool, grain and produce brokers; and general merchants, with Queensland branches at Brisbane, Rockhampton, Townsville and Toowoomba and sub-branches at Charleville, Longreach, Hughenden and Blackall. The firm bought and sold stock and stations throughout Australia and were agents for a raft of insurances to suit rural property owners, including marine, livestock, fire and accident insurance, as well as being the agents for firms handling worker compensation claims. In addition the company was the agent for many specialist companies supplying oil engines, irrigation plants, gas plants, pumps and boilers, portable steam engines, traction engines, road rollers, centrifugal pumps, farm machinery and separators. The firm also merchandised a range of practical products for farmers and graziers, such as fencing wire, gates and steel droppers and was an agent for motor cars such as Daimler, Austin and Rover and Halley and Lacre commercial lorries. In the mid 1920s Dalgety & Co. were agents for two shipping lines - the Aberdeen and White Star - and at Townsville was the booking agent with these lines for domestic passages south to Brisbane and Sydney and overseas to England.

After World War Two Dalgety & Co.'s commercial focus shifted to more general lines such as groceries, hardware, wine and spirits. Through their role as shipping and insurance agents they continued to provide important services to the regional community and were the principal domestic and overseas airline booking agent in the region.

Dalgety & Co. sold the site in 1978. In 1979 the two-storeyed section was converted into three storeys of shops and offices including two restaurants and a bar in the old basement area. The single-storeyed warehouse was converted into a shopping arcade. In the early 1980s, canvas awnings were erected over the several doorways.

In 2010, the single-storeyed warehouse was redeveloped as an apartment tower called "The Dalgety".

== Description ==
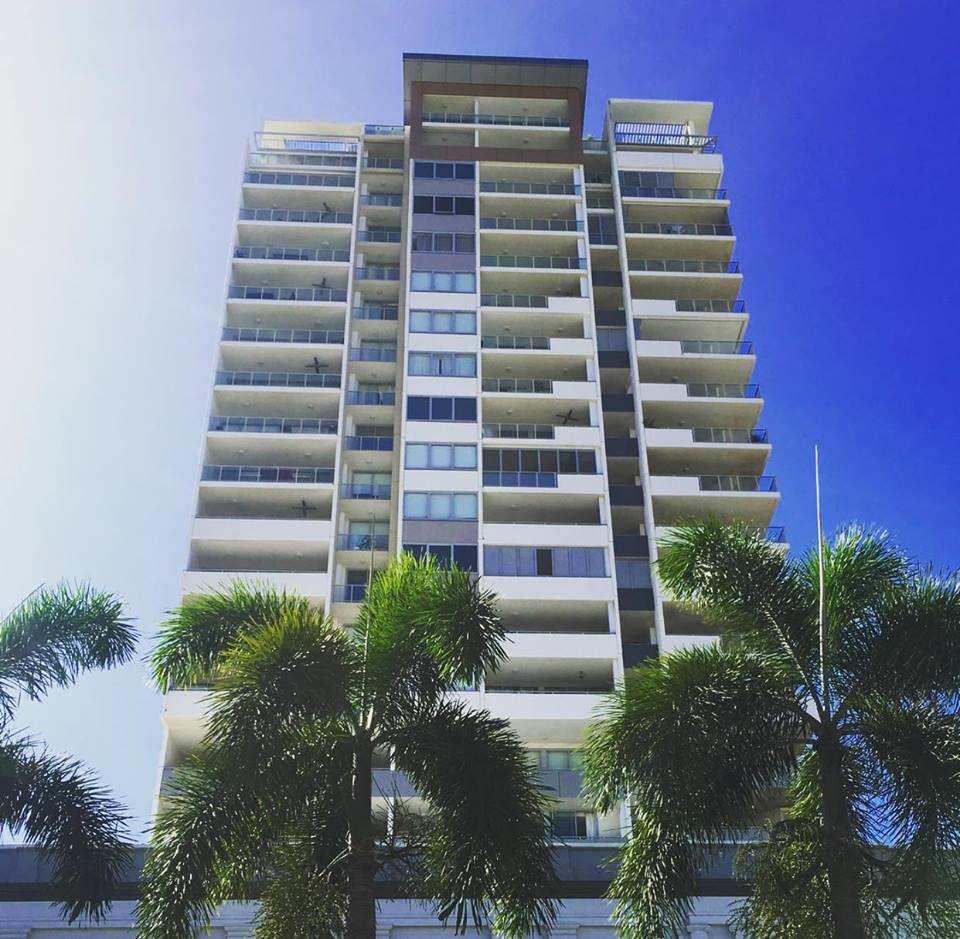
The Dalgety apartment tower in 2019

The Dalgety Offices and its former warehouse frontage are located at the corner of Denham and Sturt streets within the central business district of Townsville. It is situated within the same city block as the former Magistrate Court and Osler House. The building comprises two sections; a two-storeyed building along Sturt Street and a single-storeyed building facing Denham Street. Both are of reinforced concrete construction.

The Office building is a substantial structure situated on a corner block facing both Denham and Sturt streets. The exterior of the building retains original features such as pilasters and arched windows. A decorative plinth, finished with painted stucco runs across the width and breadth of the building interrupted by doorways. At its highest point on the Sturt Street side, the plinth stands at a height of 6 feet (1.8 m) and originally set an impressive entrance to the main office building. This entrance area is flanked by four partly fluted decorative pilasters, which incorporate neo-classical details and small Ionic capitals and is capped by a modest concrete cornice. The pattern of decorative pilasters extends upwards to the cornice and capped by ionic capitals. It does not extend to the top of the parapet.

On either side of the main Sturt Street entrance more modest pilasters extend from the plinth level through to the parapet giving a uniform visual effect. These are spaced at regular intervals. A second less ornate entrance is situated on Denham Street. On both Denham and Sturt streets above the base plinth are white painted top hung aluminum windows situated at regular intervals. Original timber four-segmented lights cap them. The aluminum windows are sympathetic to the original double hung timber windows.

Above each ground floor window are formed plastered arches and a decorative keystone. On the upper floor level of the building the timber windows have been replaced with aluminum and glass but again are sympathetic to the original.

The high parapet of the office portion of the building conceals an unusual five vaulted roof of steel construction and built in separate sections. It had two roof vents per roof which have since been removed. There is also a smaller skillion roof at the back of four of the vaults.

The interior of the former Dalgety office building has been modified from two to three floors with the original bottom floor level raised up and the basement made into two business areas, one large and one small. The smaller business area is located predominantly along the Denham Street side. It has two original small timber and glass windows protected by metal grills located along Denham Street and one window facing Sturt Street. This has been enlarged and the grilling removed. Access to both businesses in the basement is via a foyer which was the original main entrance situated on Sturt Street. Modifications include the removal of the large timber doors and large timber staircase leading to the first floor and the area blocked off. Out the front on Sturt Street there is an introduced metal and canvas awning.

The first floor has been internally modified with the removal of entrance stairs and the raising of a portion of the floor to give the basement area enough head clearance. This is the first structural bay in from the street frontage of the building. Half of the internal floor is the original height and is constructed of ex 5 inches (130 mm) hardwood boards and extends to the back of the building. Access to the modified floor is achieved by a small set of stairs at regular intervals around the room. The strongroom remains in operation at the back of the building and includes its original Protex fire resisting door. The brand name clearly in view. Original boxing around the timber columns has been removed exposing the sawn timber columns on the first floor, which are now incorporated as design features. Exposed air conditioning ducting has been added below the second floor ceiling with the main plant room possibly located in the old strong room area. The original louvre vents are retained on the exterior wall of which some have been covered up internally.

The second floor has not been raised or lowered and retains many original features. The space provided for the two main businesses is very likely to be similar to the original division of space although modern glazed aluminum screens, doors, and partitions have been added as entry to the businesses. The kitchen, storage and toilets remain located along the back wall under the skillion roof area. Original features on the second level include 6 inches (150 mm) hoop pine floorboards, fibrolite ceiling with timber strapping, simple cornice and floor mouldings and no internal architraves around the windows. Boxed facings to the timber columns have been removed exposing the sawn timber columns which are now incorporated as design features. Between the columns some original pine floorboards have been removed and replaced with 3 inches (76 mm) hardwood boards. Substantial air conditioning ducting has been added below the ceiling and is painted in the same colour as the ceiling. Partitions erected in one business, as small consulting rooms do not extend up to the ceiling and are reversible. Aluminum and glass windows have replaced the timber windows and have been made in a style sympathetic to the original. Access to upstairs is gained by a flight of stairs or lift from Denham Street as well as from other service stairs from Sturt Street. These smaller service stairs retain some original features such as art nouveau vents, but alteration to the configuration of the stairs is evident.

Dalgety's warehouse section has been converted into a shopping arcade which is accessed through a concrete tiled ramp and has a painted aluminum roller door. The warehouse has been fitted out with a series of individual shops incorporating aluminum and glass shop fronts and access to the shops within the warehouse is either from a central arcade which runs perpendicular to the main arcade entrance or from Denham Street. One business accessed from Denham Street has an aluminum and glass door fitted in the space originally occupied by a window. The original timber framed segmented window above each window remains. Modest canvas awnings are located over the windows and doorways along Denham Street.

Due to the retention of many internal features, the overall size, aesthetic street elevations and position on a corner block, the integrity of the building remains high. It is a building displaying uniform visual features and retains aspects of neo-classical design popular for commercial buildings in Queensland during the 1920s.

== Heritage listing ==
Dalgety Offices and former warehouse frontage was listed on the Queensland Heritage Register on 26 August 2005 having satisfied the following criteria.

The place is important in demonstrating the evolution or pattern of Queensland's history.

Constructed in 1923–25 for important Australian pastoral firm Dalgety & Co Ltd., the site is important in demonstrating the evolution of Queensland's history. It provides evidence of the 1920s building boom during which a number of substantial warehouse and offices in Townsville were constructed and reflects an important period of north Queensland rural prosperity. It is one of the largest reinforced-concrete buildings to survive from this era, when reinforced concrete dominated in commercial building construction in northern Queensland.

The place is important in demonstrating the principal characteristics of a particular class of cultural places.

The site remains substantially intact and is important in demonstrating the principal characteristics of its class. It is a substantial structure in reinforced concrete, combining clearly differentiated office and warehouse areas. This demarcation is articulated in the exterior facades, with the office section located prominently at the intersection of two streets and designed to present an aesthetic facade to both streets and the warehouse presenting a more functional, less decorative street elevation. The building illustrates adaptation to the tropical climate, including a substantial ventilation system and steel-framed roof constructed in vaulted sections to withstand cyclones in the office section. The use of a multi-vaulted roof on the office section is unusual. The place is a good example of the work of influential Townsville architect Walter Hunt, who designed a number of reinforced concrete commercial buildings in the 1920s and 1930s.

The place is important because of its aesthetic significance.

Through its scale, design, materials and decorative detailing, the building presents an aesthetic exterior and makes an important contribution to Townsville's inner city townscape. Its location within the same city block as the former Townsville Magistrates Court and Osler House enhances the heritage significance of the Sturt Street streetscape and inner city precinct.

The place has a special association with the life or work of a particular person, group or organisation of importance in Queensland's history.

As the Townsville offices and warehouse of Dalgety & Co Ltd for over half a century, the place has a special association with one of the largest and most successful pastoral firms in Australia. It provided a Townsville focus for the north Queensland pastoral community through much of the 20th century.
