= India Office Records =

Official records of the British government covering the British rule in India

Coordinates: 51.5297°N 0.1269°W

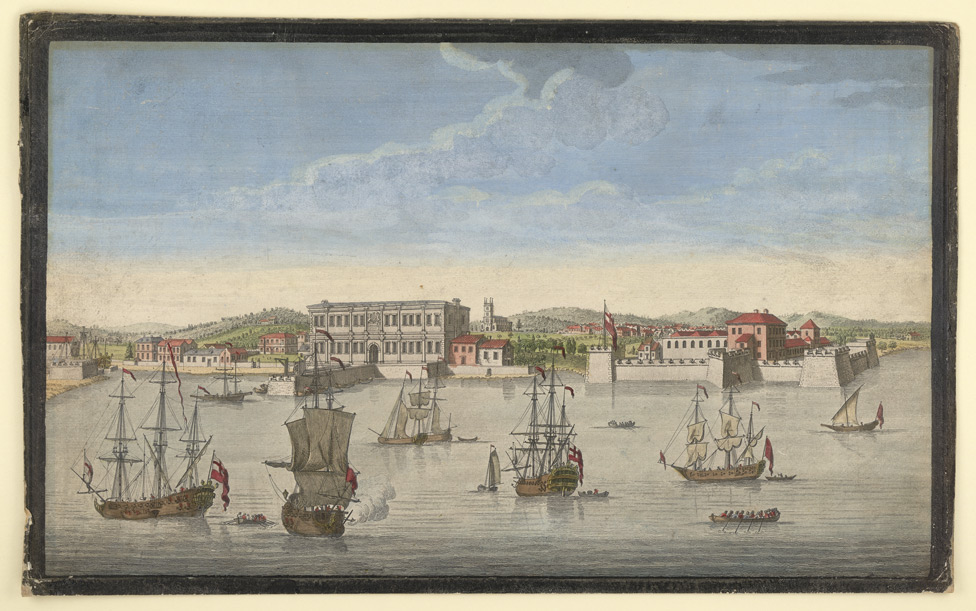
Bombay on the Malabar Coast belonging to the East India Company of England by Jan van Ryne (1754) is held by the collection.

The India Office Records are a very large collection of documents relating to the administration of India from 1600 to 1947, the period spanning Company rule and British Raj in India. The archive is held in London by the British Library and is publicly accessible. It is complemented further by The India Papers collection at the National Library of Scotland in Edinburgh.

The records come from four main sources: the English and later British East India Company (1600–1858), the Board of Control (1784–1858), the India Office (1858–1947), and the Burma Office (1937–48). The collection also includes records from many smaller related institutions. Overall, the collection is made up of approximately 175,000 items, including official publications and records, manuscripts, photographs, printed maps and private papers. These items take up approximately nine miles of shelving units.

== Historical background ==
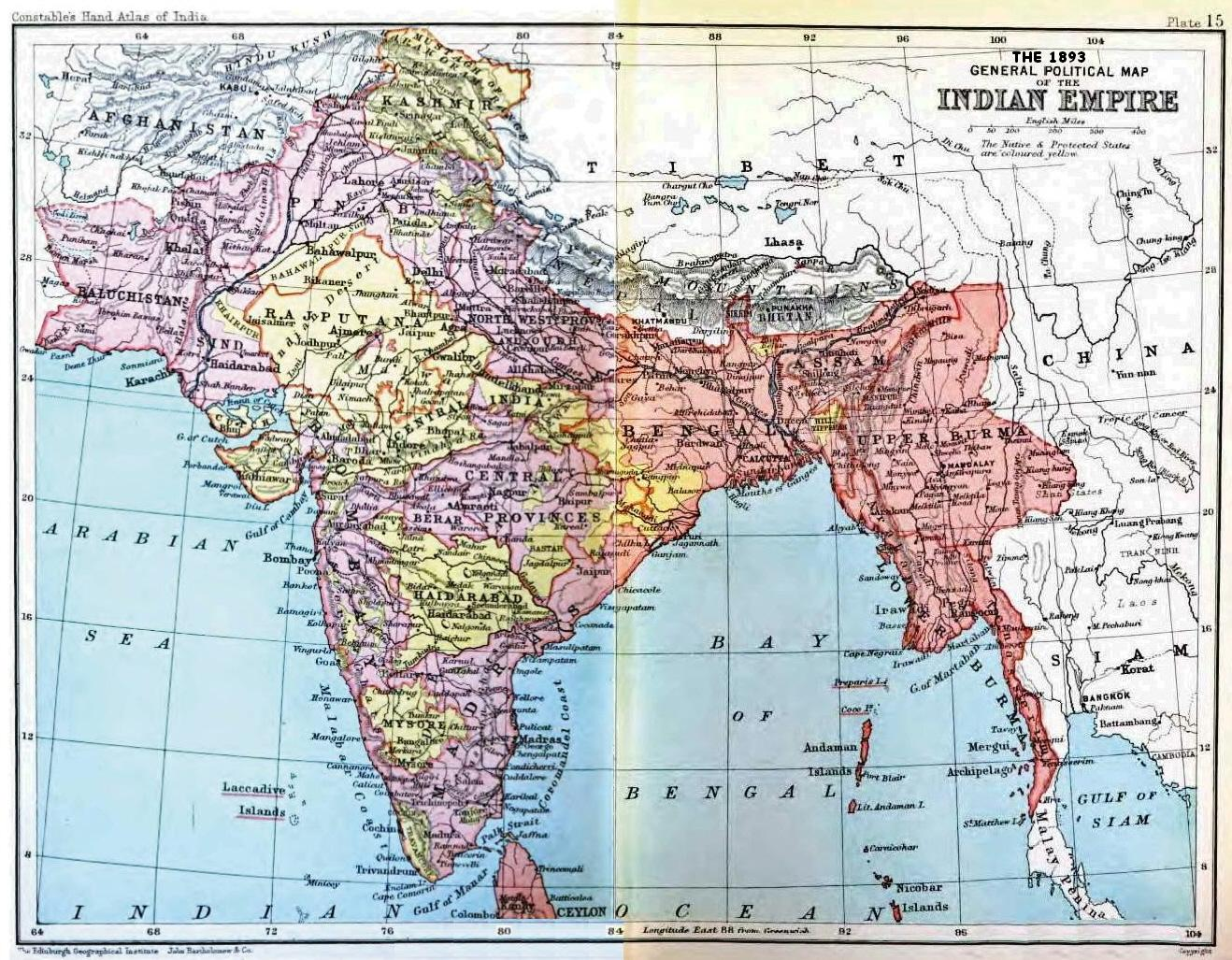
The British Indian Empire in 1893

The historical scope of the records begins in 1600, when the East India Company was granted exclusive rights to trade in much of Asia, including the entire Indian subcontinent. During its first 100 years, much of the East India Company's energy was involved in maintaining its trade privileges, as it faced competition from domestic and international companies.

Although the East India Company was established as a trading company, it became more and more involved in local affairs in India during the early 18th century, and eventually came to hold large swaths of land in the subcontinent. In the mid-18th century, the Company began to undertake a governmental role in large parts of India, in order to organize the nascent colony to better facilitate trade.

In an effort to increase its own involvement in the administration of India, the British Government passed Pitt's India Act in 1784, which established the Board of Control to direct the East India Company in its governing role.

In 1858, in the aftermath of the Indian Rebellion of 1857, the British government abolished the East India Company's right to govern India, and brought the subcontinent directly under the control of the British Empire. The India Office, under the direction of the Secretary of State for India, was established to maintain administrative control over the increasingly important colony. In 1937, a separate Burma Office was established with the separation of Burma from India under the terms of the Government of India Act 1935.

== Custodial history ==
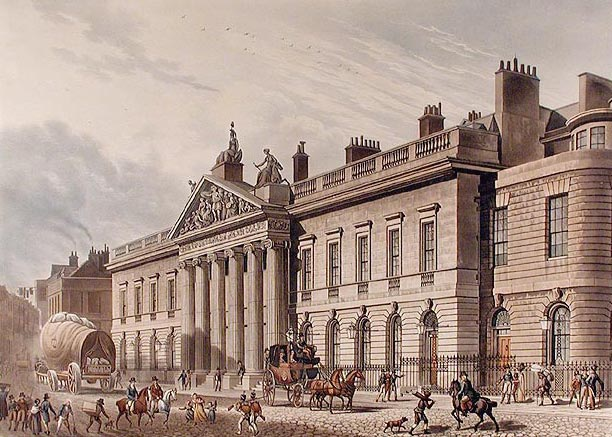
East India House in Leadenhall Street was the London headquarters of the East India Company.

There were different levels of care for the records over the years, but interest in preserving them was established very early. A “Keeper” of East India Company records was appointed in 1771, with a mission to arrange current records and to preserve historical records.

Toward the end of the East India Company's governance in India, an increasing number of documents were sent to London and incorporated into the records. In fact, it was one of the most documented administrations ever. However, when the control of India was transferred to the India Office, they set up a committee to review the records provided by the East India Company. On the committee's recommendation, more than 300 tons of records were sold as wastepaper. Although this was certainly a great loss to the collection, there is evidence that many of these records were duplicates or contained very little relevant information.

The first attempt to arrange and describe the records was undertaken in 1879, when George Birdwood published his Report on the Old Records of the India Office.

In 1947, the year of Indian independence, ownership of the records transferred to the Commonwealth Relations Office of the British government. In 1967, the Office decided to move the records to a new facility on Blackfriars Road, where they were merged with the India Office Library. It was during this transition that the records were transformed into a modern archival collection. A classification system for the records was determined, most of which is still being used.

In 1982, the entire collection was moved to the British Library. They are currently a part of the British Library Asia, Pacific and Africa Collections, and they are administered as Public Records, which means that they are available for public consultation in the British Library Reading Rooms.

== Arrangement ==
The classification system for the records was created with two goals: to preserve the original order of the records as much as was possible, and to clarify the administrative history of the records. Each series of records was assigned a letter, from A to Z, and certain series also have descriptive subclasses. The classes are as follows:

- A: East India Company: Charters, Deeds, Statutes and Treaties c.1550–c.1950
- B: East India Company: Minutes of the Court of Directors and Court of Proprietors 1599–1858
- C: Council of India Minutes and Memoranda 1858–1947
- D: East India Company: Minutes and Memoranda of General Committees 1700–1858
- E: East India Company: General Correspondence 1602–1859
- F: Board of Control Records 1784–1858
- G: East India Company Factory Records c.1595–1858
- H: India Office Home Miscellaneous Series c.1600–1900
- I: Records relating to other Europeans in India 1475–1824
- J&K: East India College, Haileybury, Records, and Records of other institutions 1749–1925
- L: India Office Departmental Records
  - L/AG: India Office: Accountant-General's Records c.1601–1974
  - L/E: India Office: Economic Department Records c.1876–1950
  - L/F: India Office: Financial Department Records c.1800–1948
  - L/I: India Office: Information Department Records 1921–1949
  - L/L: India Office: Legal Adviser's Records c.1550–c.1950
  - L/MAR: India Office: Marine Records c.1600–1879
  - L/MED: India Office: Medical Board Records c.1920–1960
  - L/MIL: India Office: Military Department Records 1708–1959
  - L/PARL: India Office: Parliamentary Branch Records c.1772–1952
  - L/PO: Secretary of State for India: Private Office Papers 1858–1948
  - L/PWD: India Office: Public Works Department 1839–1931
  - L/P&J: India Office: Public and Judicial Department Records 1795–1950
  - L/P&S: India Office: Political and Secret Department Records 1756–c.1950
  - L/R: India Office: Record Department Papers 1859–1959
  - L/SUR: India Office: Surveyor's Office Records 1837–1934
  - L/S&G: India Office: Services and General Department Records c.1920–c.1970
  - L/WS: India Office: War Staff Papers 1921–1951
- M: Burma Office Records 1932–1948
- N: Returns of Baptisms, Marriages and Burials 1698–1969
- O: Biographical Series 1702–1948
- P: Proceedings and Consultations 1702–1945
- Q: Commission, Committee and Conference Records c.1895–1947
- R: Records received in London and incorporated in India Office Records
  - R/1: India: Crown Representative: Political Department Indian States Records 1880–1947
  - R/2: India: Crown Representative: Indian States Residencies Records c.1789–1947
  - R/3: India: Viceroy's Private Office Papers and other Government Records 1899–1948
  - R/4: India: British High Commission Cemetery Records c.1870–1967
  - R/5: Nepal: Kathmandu Residency Records c.1792–1872
  - R/8: Burma: Records of the Governor's Office 1942–1947
  - R/9: Malaya: Malacca Orphan Chamber and Council of Justice Records c.1685–1835
  - R/10: China: Canton Factory Records 1623–1841
  - R/12: Afghanistan: Kabul Legation Records 1923–1948
  - R/15: Gulf States: Records of the Bushire, Bahrain, Kuwait, Muscat and Trucial States Agencies 1763–1951
  - R/19: Egypt: Records of the Cairo, Alexandria and Suez Agencies 1832–1870
  - R/20: Aden: Records of the British Administrations in Aden 1837–1967
- S: Linguistic Survey of India c.1900–c.1930
- V: India Office Records Official Publications Series c.1760–1957
- W, X & Y: India Office Records Map Collections c.1700–c.1960
- Z: Original Registers and Indexes to Records Series c.1700–1950

== Genealogical resources ==
The collection is useful for genealogical and family history research, particularly for those who have ancestors who were Anglo-Indian or who were born or lived in British India. Recognising this, the British Library has developed resources to facilitate this process, including biographical indexes, professional research services and close links with the Families In British India Society.

The East India Company, the Board of Control and the India Office kept extensive ecclesiastical records concerning British people in India. These records, including documentation of births, baptisms, marriages, and burials are all contained in the "N" series of the collection. For those who know the occupation of their ancestor in India, the British Library provides a guide to records produced by various positions, facilitating the discovery of material that an ancestor created in the course of his work for the British administration in India. Most of these records can be found in the "L" series.

== Materials relating to Gandhi ==
The collection can be used to bolster research on almost any topic involving the history of India from 1600–1947 by providing unique information relating to the British administration's understanding of events. Perhaps one of the most interesting parts of the collection is the set of records pertaining to Mohandas Gandhi. Much is known about Gandhi's life and ideas through many sources, but these records provide interesting insight into the development of his ideas, as well as his personal life. Information on the Indian administration's feelings and frustrations concerning Gandhi is also in the records.

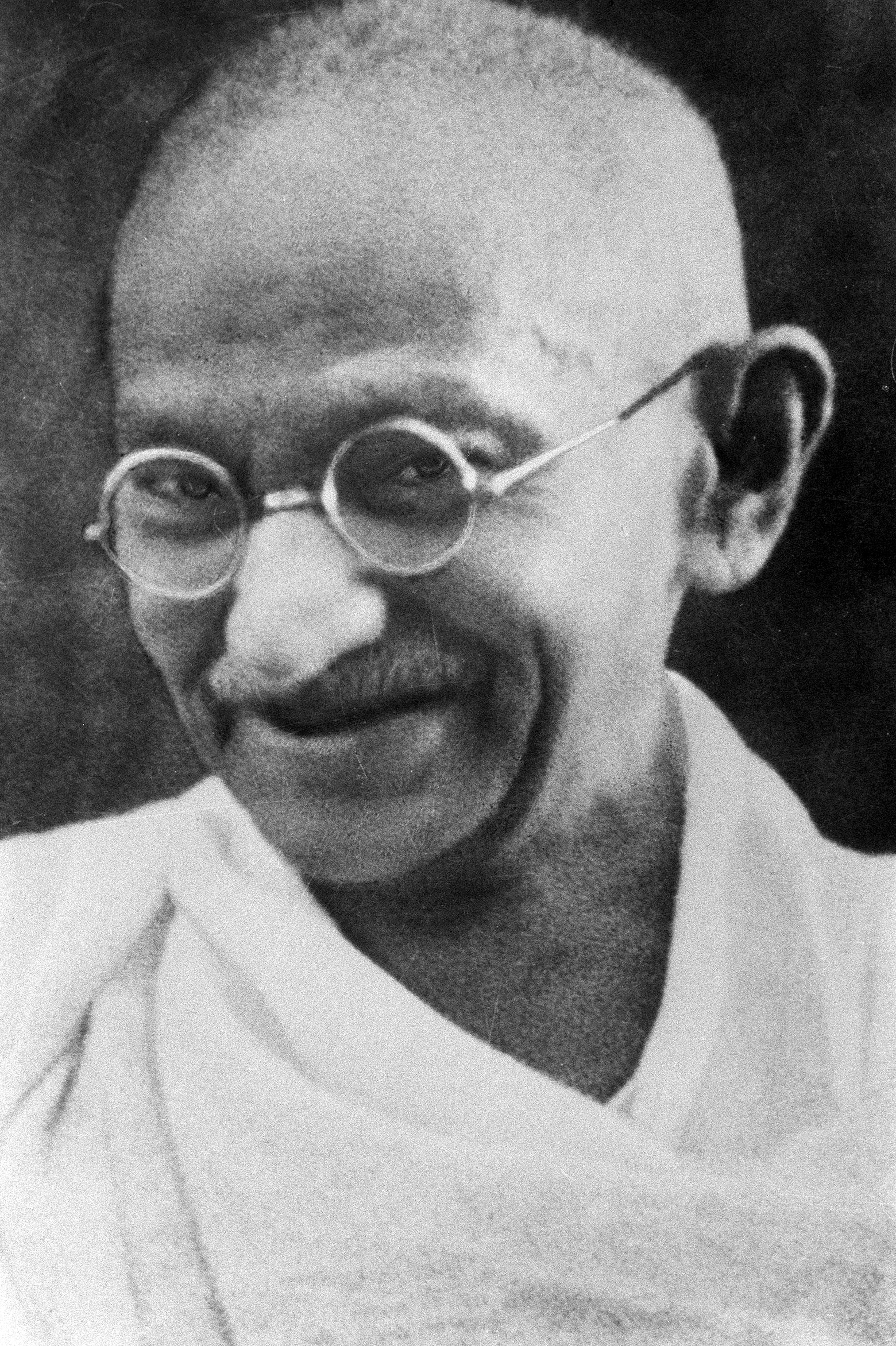
Mohandas Karamchand Gandhi

The material relating to Gandhi can be found in folders R/3/1/289–334. There are two particularly interesting sets of documents in this series. The first of these are administrative records containing reactions to Gandhi and plans concerning his activities. Most of these were originally classified as "Most Secret", "Very Secret", or "Top Secret". (This detail in itself gives insight into the administration's increasing concern with secrecy, as well as their fear of Gandhi and the threat he posed to British authority.) Many of these records are proposals for responses to Gandhi's actions, including plans to prepare for riots in the event of his death during one of his fasts.

The second set of documents consists of correspondence to and from Gandhi. Gandhi wrote extensively to various British government officials, and there are 93 letters from Gandhi, as well as 48 letters to Gandhi from the administration personnel. Many of the letters currently held in the collection are copies from originals, but as the records have been so well-kept in the 20th century, their authenticity is not in question. The time period of the correspondence is 1922 to 1945.

Many of the letters from Gandhi express criticism of British policies in India and reveal Gandhi's sophisticated analysis of world politics, as well as his commitment to peace. In many, he appeals to the British to work with him to end the oppression of the Indians.

Perhaps the most unusual of Gandhi's letters in the collection is a copy of a letter sent to Adolf Hitler, in which Gandhi expresses admiration for Hitler's passion for his nation, but urges him to seek non-violent means to address Germany's concerns. He also refers to some of Hitler's writings as "monstrous", and makes it clear that he has no interest in seeking German aid for the end of British rule in India.

The most personal of letters from Gandhi in the collection relate to the illness and death of his wife in 1944. In these letters, one can see Gandhi's frustration at watching Kasturba Gandhi's condition worsen as he was powerless to help her. He repeatedly appealed to the British to send medical aid, including an Ayurvedic physician, and when it became clear that she would not survive, he lashed out at them, complaining that her treatment was inadequate.

Most of the letters written to Gandhi contained in the collection are accusatory, complaining that Gandhi did not live up to his rhetoric about non-violence. The letters reflect a belief that Gandhi's fasts and other dramatic forms of protest stirred up violence among the Indian population. Many of the letters also deny Gandhi's accusations that the British government was involved in systematic repression of the Indian people and failed to live up to its role as a steward of India and the Indian people.

There is also one letter in the collection from Franklin Roosevelt, who was the President of the United States at the time. In the letter, he acknowledges Gandhi's concerns about India, but suggests that World War II and the defeat of the Axis powers should take precedence. He asks Gandhi to support the British regime so that they will not be forced to divide their attention.

== See also ==
- Families In British India Society
- Historiography of the British Empire

== Bibliography ==
- Farrington, Anthony, ed. (1976). The Records of the East India College, Haileybury, & other institutions. London: H.M.S.O.
- Farrington, Anthony, ed. (1999). Catalogue of East India Company ships' journals and logs: 1600–1834. London: British Library. ISBN 978-0-7123-4646-7.
- Moir, Martin (1988). A General Guide to the India Office Records. London: British Library. ISBN 9780712306294.
- Seton, Rosemary (1986). The Indian "Mutiny" 1857–58: A Guide to Source Material in the India Office Library and Records. London: British Library. ISBN 0712300414.
- Singh, Amar Kaur Jasbir (1980). Gandhi and Civil Disobedience: Documents in the India Office Records 1922–1946. London: India Office Library and Records. ISBN 0903359278.
- Stern, Philip J. (2009). "History and historiography of the English East India Company: Past, present, and future!". History Compass. 7 (4): 1146–1180. doi:10.1111/j.1478-0542.2009.00617.x.
- Van Meersbergen, G. (2017). "Writing East India Company History after the Cultural Turn: Interdisciplinary Perspectives on the Seventeenth-Century East India Company and Verenigde Oostindische Compagnie" (PDF). Journal for Early Modern Cultural Studies. 17 (3): 10–36. doi:10.1353/jem.2017.0016.
