= Dalgety (surname) =

Dalgety is a surname. Notable people with the surname include:

- Frederick Dalgety (1817–1894), Canadian merchant and financier
- Ramsay Robertson Dalgety, Scottish and Tongan lawyer and judge
- Susan Dalgety, Scottish writer and politician
- Tom Dalgety, British record producer
