= The Asiatic Journal and Monthly Register for British India and Its Dependencies =

The Asiatic Journal and Monthly Register for British India and its Dependencies was a regular publication which aimed to be “a faithful register of Indian Occurrences”.

== About the Journal ==
The journal was sponsored by the East India Company, and was designed to record and share information relating to India and the East India Company, and covered a broad range of commercial, political and cultural content. The journal was printed for Black, Parbury and Allen, booksellers to the East India Company.

The preface of the first volume states its aims:

The convenience and gratification of that extensive portion of the British Public, which either at home or abroad is connected with our Indian dominions, have been the objects pursued in the projection and conduct of the Asiatic Journal.

It was obvious, that while the East-Indies opened to every British reader, and especially to every one immediately interested in its concerns, the widest field of useful and liberal information, there was much which could only be explored and detailed in a work expressly devoted to those objects.

The journal was issued for almost forty years, from 1816 to 1845, in three series, each issued under a slightly different title:

- 1816–1829: The Asiatic Journal and Monthly Register for British India and its Dependencies
- 1830–1843: The Asiatic Journal and Monthly Register for British and Foreign India, China, and Australasia
- 1843–1845: The Asiatic Journal and Monthly Miscellany

== See also ==
- Company rule in India
- Families In British India Society
