= Families In British India Society =

FIBIS

The Families In British India Society (FIBIS) is a genealogical organisation which assists people in researching their family history and the background against which their ancestors led their lives in British India.

== Scope ==
FIBIS was formed in November 1998 to provide research and social history resources for India from 1600 up to (and even after) Indian Independence in 1947. It covers the earlier part of the British East India Company's history and provides help and advice on researching it both in England and abroad, and all EIC stations, including those outside the Indian sub-continent.

The Society states that it "does not concentrate on the Raj period nor solely on the British in India because to do so would exclude a number of other nationalities who played an important part and became part of the Indian culture."

== Resources ==
FIBIS provides books, journals, online resources and community facilities to assist research into individuals' ancestors and the social structure in which they lived. They also host a wiki to aid information sharing and research.

=== Transcription and publishing of records ===
In conjunction with the British Library, FIBIS have a programme of transcribing and publishing East India Company and India Office material that was previously only available in the India Office Records at the library. These transcriptions are freely available to the general public in searchable form on the FIBIS website. Information available covers areas including lists of Indian cemeteries, ecclesiastical records (births, marriages and deaths), passenger lists, military history and wills.

== See also ==
- British Association for Cemeteries in South Asia
- Indian Military Historical Society
- Commonwealth War Graves Commission
- British Raj
- Company rule in India
- Family history
- The Asiatic Journal and Monthly Register for British India and its Dependencies
