= Architectural and Building Journal of Queensland =

The Architectural and Building Journal of Queensland was a monthly trade magazine about architecture and construction published in Brisbane, Queensland, Australia.

== History ==
The journal was established in July 1922 and published monthly. In February 1944 it changed its name to Architectural & Building Journal until April 1945, after which it became Architecture, Building, Engineering until June 1954. It then changed its name to Architecture, Building, Structural Engineering until March 1971, when it returned to Architecture, Building, Engineering until its final issue in December 1973.
