= Scottish Affairs =

- Discipline: Scottish politics
- Language: English
- Edited by: Michael Rosie

Publication details
- History: 1992–present
- Publisher: Edinburgh University Press (United Kingdom)
- Frequency: Quarterly

Standard abbreviations
- ISO 4: Scott. Aff.

Indexing
- ISSN: 0966-0356 (print); 2053-888X (web)
- LCCN: 94640271
- OCLC no.: 27420904

Links
- Journal homepage; Online access; Online archive

Scottish Affairs is a peer-reviewed academic journal covering Scottish politics and current affairs. It was established in 1992 and has been published by Edinburgh University Press since 2014. It is the successor to the Scottish Government Yearbooks, which ran from 1976 to 1992.

The editor-in-chief is Michael Rosie (2015–present), who succeeded Lindsay Paterson (1992–2015).
