= Townsville State Government Offices (Flinders Street) =

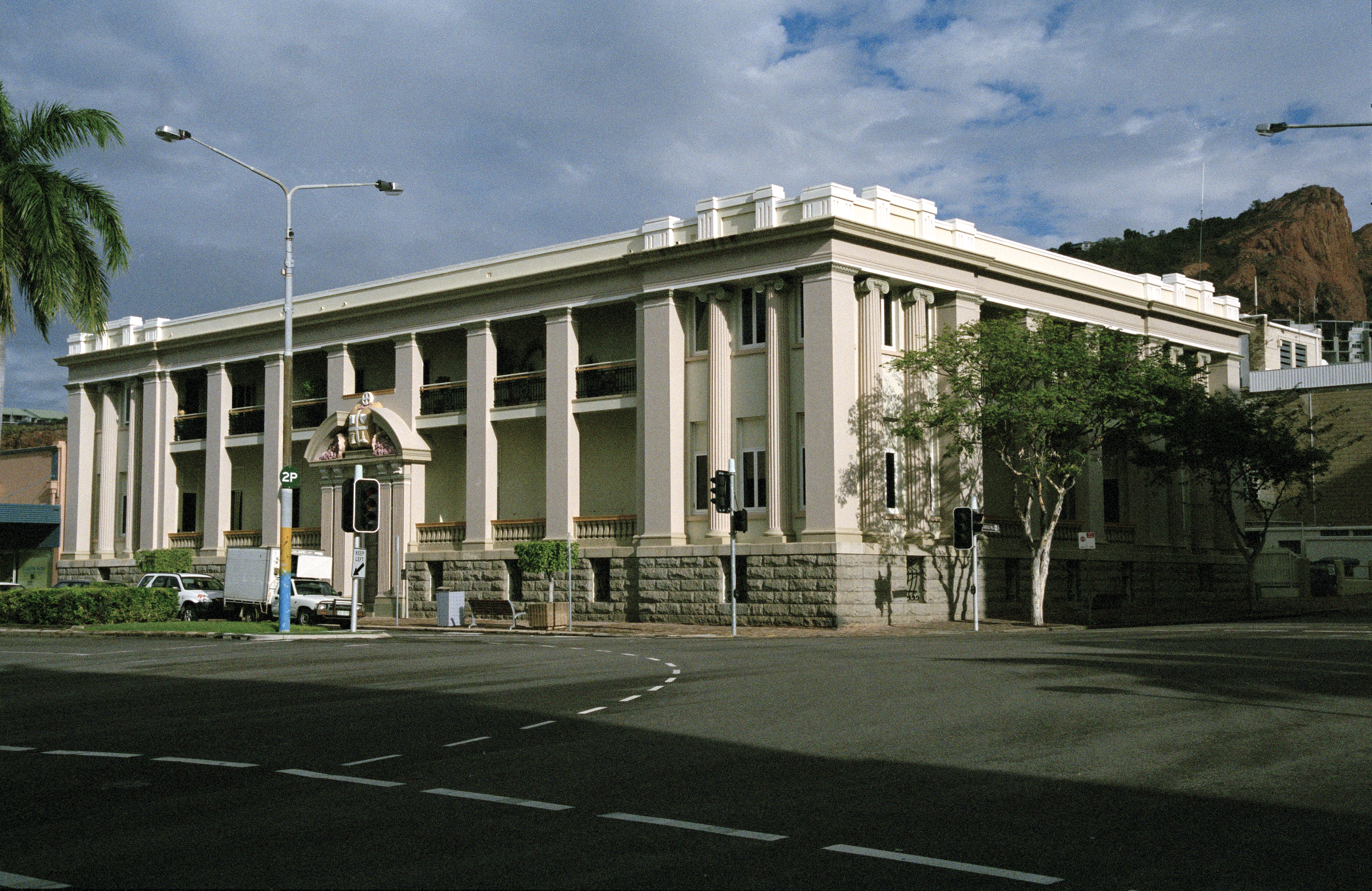
- Townsville State Government Offices, 2005

- Location within Queensland Location within Australia
- 19.2614°S 146.8151°E
- Location: 419 Flinders Street, Townsville CBD, City of Townsville, Queensland, Australia

History
- Design period: 1919–1930s (interwar period)
- Built: 1928

Site notes
- Architect: Andrew Baxter Leven
- Architectural style: Classicism

Queensland Heritage Register
- Official name: State Government Offices, Former Public Curator's Office
- Type: state heritage (built)
- Designated: 13 January 1995
- Reference no.: 601385
- Significant period: 1920s (fabric)
- Builders: Queensland Department of Public Works

Townsville State Government Offices is a heritage-listed office building at 419 Flinders Street, Townsville CBD, City of Townsville, Queensland, Australia. It was designed by Andrew Baxter Leven and built in 1928 by Queensland Department of Public Works. It is also known as the former Public Curator's Office. It was added to the Queensland Heritage Register on 13 January 1995.

== History ==
The State Government Offices were built in 1928 by the Queensland Department of Public Works to accommodate various departmental offices in Townsville in one central location.

Townsville was proclaimed a town in 1866. It experienced its first phase of major growth when gold was discovered in the nearby town of Ravenswood in 1868. Townsville became the leading regional centre in north Queensland reflected by the construction of the State Government Offices, one of the earliest examples of purpose-built offices for state government departments.

The State Government Offices was constructed under the supervision of the Queensland Department of Public Works in 1928. The chief architect at the time was Andrew Baxter Leven who was employed by the department from 1910 to 1951, also associated with the design of the building was another Works Department employee, FL Jones. The building is typical of many other government buildings of the time including the Cairns Court House, City Council building and Post Office, Cairns Post, Maryborough Government Offices Building and Maryborough City Hall.

The offices were designed to accommodate a further storey above the entablature. Various State Departments were accommodated within the building including State Insurance, Public Curator, State Children and Health Departments, Titles, Stamp Duties, Lands and Marine, Machinery and Mines. Provisions were also made for the installation of a lift in the event of the third storey being built. The building was designed to ensure adequate lighting and natural ventilation.

== Description ==
The State Government Offices in Townsville is a two storeyed masonry building with a basement. Externally, the building features a rock-faced granite plinth and cement rendered facade. The main entrance, on Flinders Street, is surmounted by a broken pediment with a crest supported on pairs of engaged square fluted columns, and is centrally located within a two-storey colonnade. The ground floor storey has an ornate concrete balustrade whilst the upper storey a simple wrought iron balustrade. The corner bays of the building feature colossal order stylised ionic columns. The facade of the building is surmounted by a deep entablature, crowned by a parapet. Internally, the main entrance doors open into a vestibule from which a flight of marble steps, flanked by a pair of ionic columns, leads into the main corridor.

== Heritage listing ==
State Government Offices was listed on the Queensland Heritage Register on 13 January 1995 having satisfied the following criteria.

The place is important in demonstrating the evolution or pattern of Queensland's history.

The State Government Offices (the former Public Curator's Office) in Townsville is one of the earliest examples of state government offices built outside Brisbane which reflects the prominence of Townsville as a major regional centre in Queensland in the 1920s.

The place is important in demonstrating the principal characteristics of a particular class of cultural places.

Townsville State Government Offices, erected in 1928, is significant as a good example of a building designed by the Department of Public Works in the 1920s influenced by classical revival styles.

The place is important because of its aesthetic significance.

The building forms a prominent landmark on the corner of Flinders and Stanley Streets and contributes to the streetscape value of Flinders Street which is characterised by buildings of similar scale and form.
