= Amina Shah (librarian) =

Scottish librarian

Amina Shah FRSE is a Scottish librarian who is National Librarian and Chief Executive of the National Library of Scotland.

== Early life and education ==
Shah was born in Pakistan to a Scottish mother and Pakistani father.

Shah studied English literature at the University of Dundee, graduating in 1996 with an MA Hons. In 1997, she gained a postgraduate diploma in librarianship and information science from the University of Strathclyde.

== Career ==
From 2001 to 2014, Shah was Deputy Head of Dundee City Libraries. She was the Chief Executive Officer of Scottish Library and Information Council (SLIC) from 2014 to 2016 where she led on the development of Scotland's first national strategy for public libraries. From 2016 to 2018, she held the position of Director of Programming at the Scottish Book Trust.

Prior to her appointment at the National Library of Scotland Shah was Assistant Director of Libraries and Museums at University of St Andrews from 2018 to 2021.

On 4 October 2021, Shah took up the position of National Librarian and Chief Executive at the National Library of Scotland. She is the first woman and the first person of mixed race to hold the post. Prior to becoming National Librarian Shah was a member of the Board of the National Library of Scotland (2015-2021).

Since 2015 Shah has been a visiting professor at Robert Gordon University. She was President of the Scottish librarian association CILIPS.

Shah is a trustee of the StAnza Poetry Festival, Friends of National Libraries, and the Institute for Advanced Studies in the Humanities at the University of Edinburgh.

== Honours and awards ==
In March 2023, Shah was elected a Fellow of the Royal Society of Edinburgh.
