= List of libraries in Queensland =

The following is a list of libraries in Queensland, Australia.

- State Library of Queensland

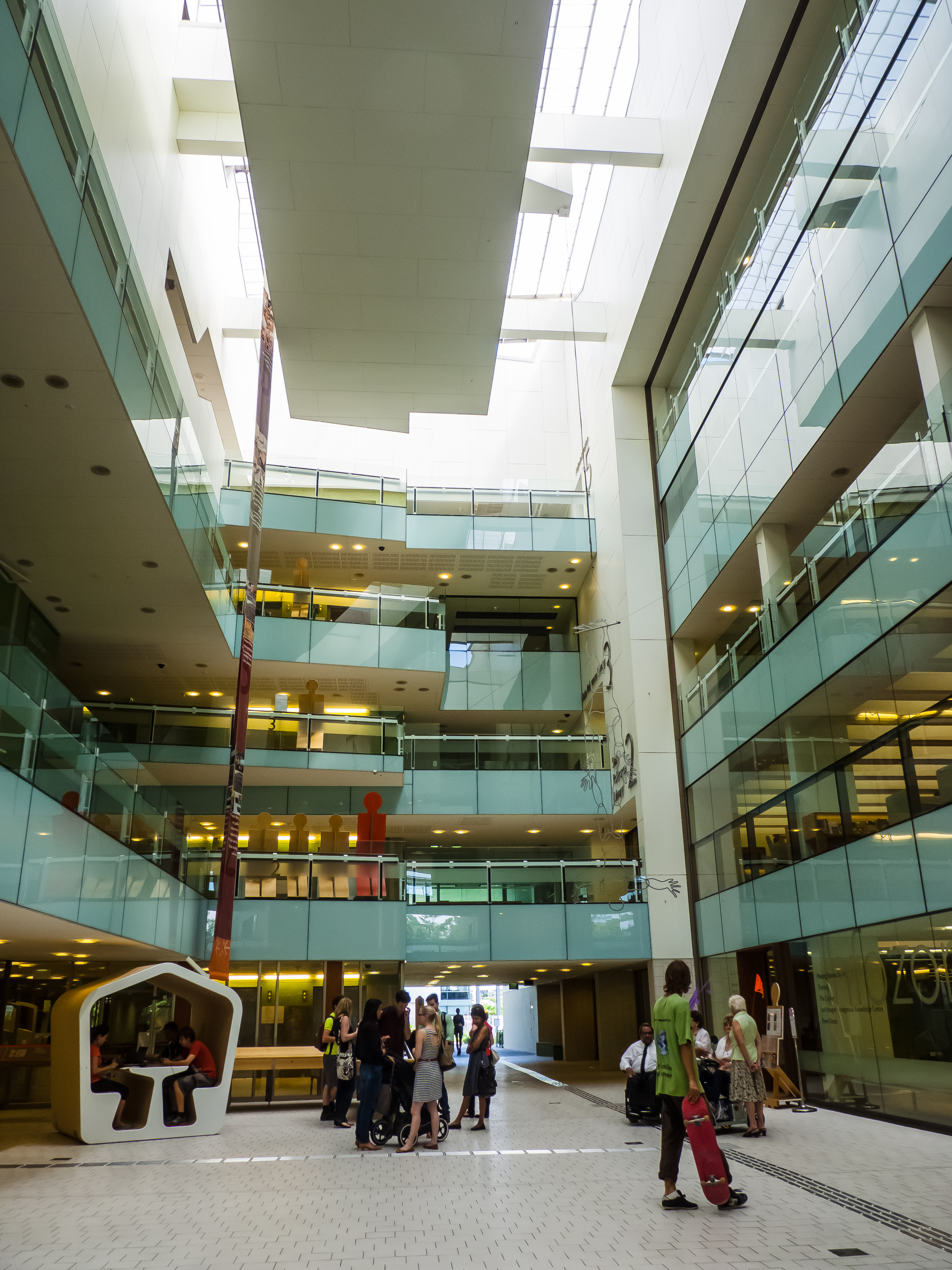
Atrium of the State Library of Queensland

== Academic Libraries ==
- Australian Catholic University Library (Australian Catholic University)
- John and Alison Kearney Library (Bond University)
- CQUniversity Library (Central Queensland University)
- Fed Uni Library (Federation University Australia)
- Cyril Golding Library (Central Queensland University)
- Griffith University Library (Griffith University)
- Eddie Koiki Mabo Library (James Cook University)
- QUT Library (Queensland University of Technology)
- University of Queensland Library (University of Queensland)
- UniSQ Library (University of Southern Queensland)
- USC Sunshine Coast Libraries (University of the Sunshine Coast)
- Southern Cross University Library (Southern Cross University)
- Torrens University Australia Library (Torrens University)

== Public Libraries ==
Public libraries in Queensland are operated by local government councils. Local government areas with a population below 15,000 provide public library services through Rural Libraries Queensland (formerly the Country Lending Service), a service provided by the State Library of Queensland. The Queensland public library services and the suburbs and localities they serve via local libraries, mobile libraries and Indigenous Knowledge Centres are:

=== Rural Libraries Queensland collaborative collection network ===
- Banana mobile library (Shire of Banana)
- Barcaldine Regional Council Libraries (Barcaldine Region)
- Barcoo Shire Libraries (Shire of Barcoo)
- Blackall Municipal Library (Blackall-Tambo Region)
- Boulia Shire Council Libraries (Shire of Boulia)
- Burke Shire Libraries (Shire of Burke)
- Burdekin Shire Libraries (Shire of Burdekin)
- Carpentaria Libraries (Shire of Carpentaria)
- Croydon Shire Library Services (Shire of Croydon)
- Cloncurry Bob McDonald Library (Shire of Cloncurry)
- Cook Shire Libraries (Shire of Cook)
- Diamantina Shire Libraries (Shire of Diamantina)
- Georgetown Library (Shire of Etheridge)
- Douglas Shire Libraries (Shire of Douglas)
- Flinders Library (Shire of Flinders)
- Hinchinbrook Shire Libraries (Shire of Hinchinbrook)
- Longreach Regional Libraries (Longreach Region)
- Maranoa Regional Libraries (Maranoa Region)
- Mareeba Shire Libraries (Shire of Mareeba)
- McKinlay Shire Libraries (Shire of Mckinlay)
- Murweh Shire Libraries (Shire of Murweh)
- North Burnett Regional Libraries (North Burnett Region)
- St George Library (Shire of Balonne)
- Quilpie Library (Shire of Quilpie)
- Thargomindah Library (Bulloo Shire Council)
- Winton Library (Shire of Winton)

=== Independent libraries ===
- Brisbane City Libraries (City of Brisbane)
- Bundaberg Regional Libraries (Bundaberg Region)
- Gold Coast City Libraries (City of Gold Coast)
- Cairns Regional Council Libraries (Cairns Region)
- Cassowary Coast Libraries (Cassowary Coast Region)
- Central Highlands Libraries (Central Highlands Region)
- Charters Towers Excelsior Library (Charters Towers Region)
- Fraser Coast Libraries (Fraser Coast Region)
- Gladstone Regional Council Libraries (Gladstone Region)
- Goondiwindi RegionalLibraries (Goondiwindi Region)
- Gympie Regional Libraries (Gympie Region)
- Ipswich City Libraries (City of Ipswich)
- Isaac Region Libraries (Isaac Region)
- Livingstone Shire Libraries (Shire of Livingstone)
- Lockyer Valley Regional Libraries (Lockyer Valley Region)
- Logan City Libraries (Logan City)
- Mackay Regional Council Libraries (Mackay Region)
- Mount Isa City Library (City of Mount Isa)
- Moreton Bay City Council Libraries (City of Moreton Bay)
- Ngulaig Meta (Shire of Torres)
- Noosa Council Libraries (Shire of Noosa)
- Paroo Shire Libraries (Shire of Paroo)
- Richmond Library (Shire of Richmond)
- Redland City Council Libraries (Redland City)
- Rockhampton Regional Libraries (Rockhampton Region)
- Scenic Rim Regional Libraries (Scenic Rim Region)
- Stanage Bay Library (Stanage Bay; run by volunteers with support from the Livingstone Shire Libraries)
- Somerset Regional Libraries (Somerset Region)
- South Burnett Regional Libraries (South Burnett Region)
- Southern Downs Regional Libraries (Southern Downs Region)
- Sunshine Coast Regional Libraries (Sunshine Coast Region)
- Tablelands Regional Libraries (Tablelands Region)
- Toowoomba Regional Libraries (Toowoomba Region)
- Townsville CityLibraries (City of Townsville)
- Whitsunday Regional Libraries (Whitsunday Region)
- Western Downs Regional Libraries (Western Downs Region)

=== Indigenous Knowledge Centres ===
- Bwgcolman Indigenous Knowledge Center (Aboriginal Shire of Palm Island)
- Cherbourg Indigenous Knowledge Centre (Aboriginal Shire of Cherbourg)
- Hope Vale Indigenous Knowledge Centre (Aboriginal Shire of Hope Vale)
- Wik Mungkan Knowledge Centre (Shire of Aurukun)
- Lockhart River Indigenous Knowledge Centre (Aboriginal Shire of Lockhart River)
- Mary Ann Coconut Library (Aboriginal Shire of Napranum)
- Northern Peninsula Indigenous Knowledge Centres (Northern Peninsula Area Region)
- Thaayorre-Munkan Library (Aboriginal Shire of Pormpuraaw)
- Torres Strait Island Regional Libraries (Torres Strait Island Region)
- Woorabinda Indigenous Knowledge Centre (Aboriginal Shire of Woorabinda)
- Binal Mungka Bayan Knowledge Centre (Aboriginal Shire of Wujal Wujal)
- Yarrabah Knowledge Centre (Aboriginal Shire of Yarrabah)

== Special Libraries ==
=== Law libraries ===
- Queensland Parliamentary Library
- John and Alison Kearney Law Library (Bond University)

=== GLAM libraries ===
- The Australian Cultural Library
- Queensland Museum Library
- Queensland Art Gallery and Gallery of Modern Art (QAGOMA) Research Library

=== Historical libraries ===
- Queensland Family History Society

== See also ==
- Old State Library Building, heritage listed building that was previously a Brisbane library.
- Mechanics' institutes of Australia
