= Charters Towers Airport =

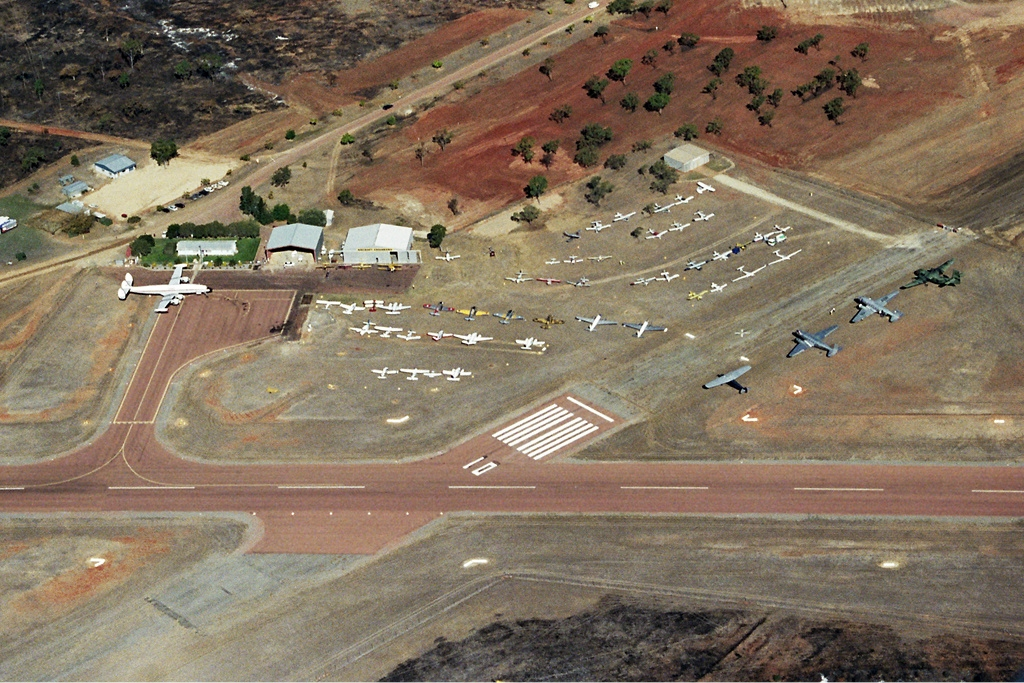
- Airport overview
- IATA: CXT; ICAO: YCHT

Summary
- Airport type: Public
- Operator: Charters Towers Regional Council
- Location: Charters Towers, Queensland
- Elevation AMSL: 955 ft / 291 m
- Coordinates: 20°02′38.2″S 146°16′24.4″E

Map
- Location in Queensland

Runways
| Direction | Length | | Surface |
| Direction | m | ft | Surface |
|---|---|---|---|
| 01/19 | 1,005 | 3,297 | Gravel/Bituman |
| 06/24 | 1,736 | 5,696 | Asphalt |
- Sources: AIP

Charters Towers Airport (IATA: CXT, ICAO: YCHT) is an airport located in Columbia, Charters Towers, Queensland, Australia, 2.9 nautical miles (5.4 km; 3.3 mi) north of the Charters Towers CBD.

== History ==
=== World War II ===
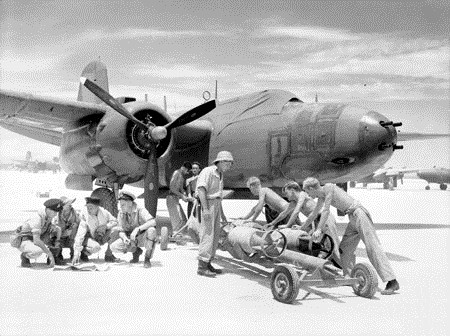
No. 22 Squadron aircrew and ground crew preparing for a sortie in October 1944

During World War II, the United States Army Air Forces Fifth Air Force stationed the following units at the airfield:

- No. 22 Squadron RAAF, A-20 Boston
- 3d Bombardment Group, (10 March 1942 – 28 January 1943) (Headquarters)

8th Bombardment Squadron, A-20 Havoc (17–31 March 1942; 9 May 1942 – 28 January 1943)
90th Bombardment Squadron, A-20 Havoc (8 March 1942 – 28 January 1943)

- 431st Fighter Squadron (475th Fighter Group), P-38 Lightning (14 May – 1 July 1943)
- 432d Fighter Squadron (475th Fighter Group), P-38 Lightning (14 May – 11 July 1943)
- 433d Fighter Squadron (475th Fighter Group), P-38 Lightning (14 May – 17 June 1943)
- 16th Bombardment Squadron (Light) (27th Bombardment Group (Light)), A-24 Dauntless (1 April – 4 May 1942)
- 17th Bombardment Squadron (Light) (27th Bombardment Group (Light)), A-24 Dauntless (1 April – 4 May 1942)
- 91st Bombardment Squadron (Light) (27th Bombardment Group (Light)), A-24 Dauntless (24 March 1942)

In addition, 370th Service Squadron managed the day to day USAAF Base operations of the airfield.

== Heritage listings ==
Charters Towers Airport has a heritage listing for the Bore Sight Range and Compass Swinging Platform established during World War II.

== See also ==
- United States Army Air Forces in Australia (World War II)
- List of airports in Queensland
