= The Evening Telegraph (Charters Towers) =

Australian daily newspaper (1901–1921)

The Evening Telegraph was a daily newspaper published between 1901 and 1921 in Charters Towers, Queensland, Australia.

== Digitisation ==
The paper has been digitised as part of the Australian Newspapers Digitisation Program of the National Library of Australia.
