= Church of Christ, Charters Towers =

Church of Christ
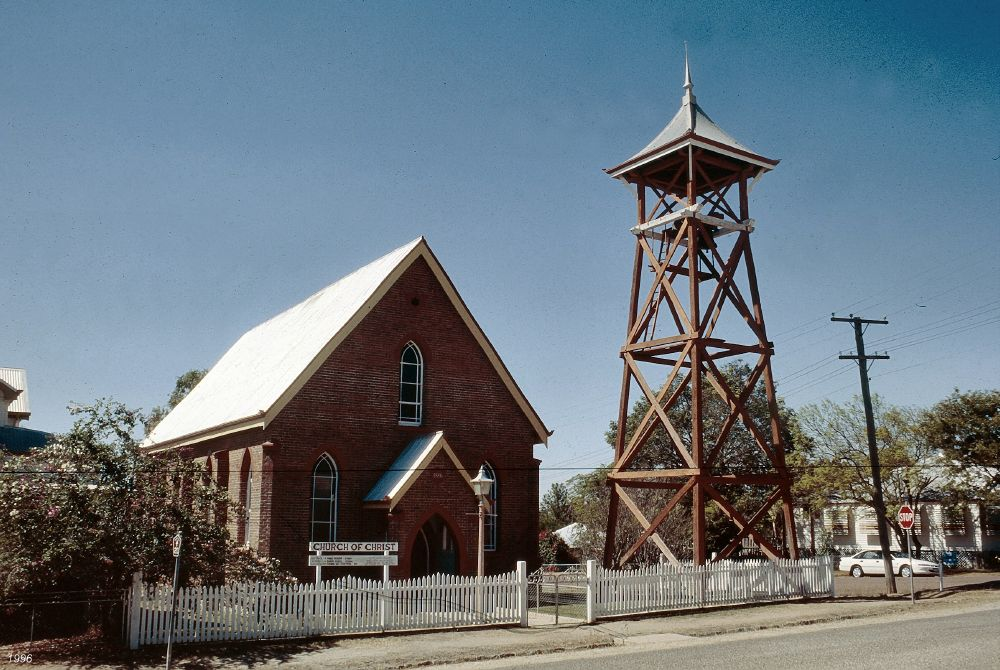
- Church of Christ, 1996

- Location within Queensland Location within Australia
- 20.0737°S 146.2634°E
- Location: Anne Street, Charters Towers City, Charters Towers, Charters Towers Region, Queensland, Australia

History
- Design period: 1870s–1890s (late 19th century)
- Built: 1885–1887

Site notes
- Architectural style: Gothic

Queensland Heritage Register
- Official name: Church of Christ, Charters Towers, St Johannes Lutheran Church, The 'German Church'
- Type: state heritage (built)
- Designated: 28 May 1999
- Reference no.: 601245
- Significant period: 1880s–1910s (historical); 1880s (fabric)
- Significant components: tower – bell / belfry, church, views to, furniture/fittings, stained glass window/s

Church of Christ is a heritage-listed church at Anne Street, Charters Towers City, Charters Towers, Charters Towers Region, Queensland, Australia. It was built from 1885 to 1887. It is also known as St Johannes Lutheran Church and The "German Church". It was added to the Queensland Heritage Register on 28 May 1999.

== History ==
The Church of Christ in Charters Towers was constructed in 1885–87 as the first Lutheran Church in Charters Towers. After 1915, when the church was sold, the building became used as the Charters Towers Church of Christ.

Gold was discovered at Charters Towers in December, 1871. The first mining claims were issued in January, 1872 and the new gold field was proclaimed on 31 August 1872. Populations on the fields grew with the most durable towns being established where reefing gold was the predominant form of mining. By the early 1880s technological innovation had improved production on the reef field. Large scale mining companies began to form at about this time in Charters Towers. The establishment of these companies was given a boost through the introduction of mining safety legislation and increased British investment.

By 1882 company mining became the rule rather than the exception on the Charters Towers field. One such company was the Day Dawn PC, formed after rich deposits of gold were found on land owned by a small group of German miners led by Frederick Pfeiffer. Pfeiffer and his partners, Messrs Heinrich Paradies, Carl Augustus Reidrich, Hamann, Romberge, Levers and Christian became enormously wealthy with the mine eventually yielding 1,000,000 pounds (450,000 kg) in gold. The group, who sold the mine in 1887, were among the wealthiest men in the town. All of them remained in Charters Towers and later invested in other mining ventures.

The growth in reef mining led to a growth in population with miners and their families arriving from all over the world. The population structure of the new gold field is not well documented, however, it is fair to say that many nationalities were represented on the Charters Towers field, including a small group from Germany. This group was to become one of the first Lutheran communities in Queensland.

While some church groups were able to attend organised services after c. 1872 in Charters Towers, German Lutherans did not have access to a minister or church when they first arrived in the early 1880s. At first they met in private homes and later in the Oddfellows Hall. While this arrangement was satisfactory initially, in 1885 some members of the Day Dawn PC partnership decided to finance the building of a church for their community.

Many local German people contributed to the cost of a new building. Mr Christian Paradies, the founder of the congregation, donated more than £1800 towards the erection of a brick church which was known as the St Johannes Lutheran Church and he bequeathed a further £1000 to the church. Carl Riederich donated the building site and contributed to the building costs and the bells. Friedrich Pfeiffer and Heinrich Paradies shared the costs of building the parsonage. The foundation stone was laid on 5 Decemberm1885 and the church was completed in March 1886. The total cost of construction of the church was £2500.

The designer and builder are not known but Mr Zander, formerly of Beenleigh, worked as a bricklayer on the site.

Pastor EO Maiser of German Station in Brisbane (later known as Nundah) was the first pastor in Charters Towers and opened the church on 13 June 1886. The bell tower, hung with two bells brought from Germany, was completed in 1887.

In 1897 the Lutheran Church community was affiliated with the State Church of Prussia and the church became the focal point for the German community in Charters Towers. Language classes and community festivities were some of the activities held at the church.

The Lutheran community remained active in Charters Towers until the First World War, when Pastor G Schafhirt was repatriated to Germany. The church community declined during the war and the property was sold to the Church of England in September, 1915. Since that time the church has been a place of worship for the Church of Christ community of Charters Towers.

== Description ==
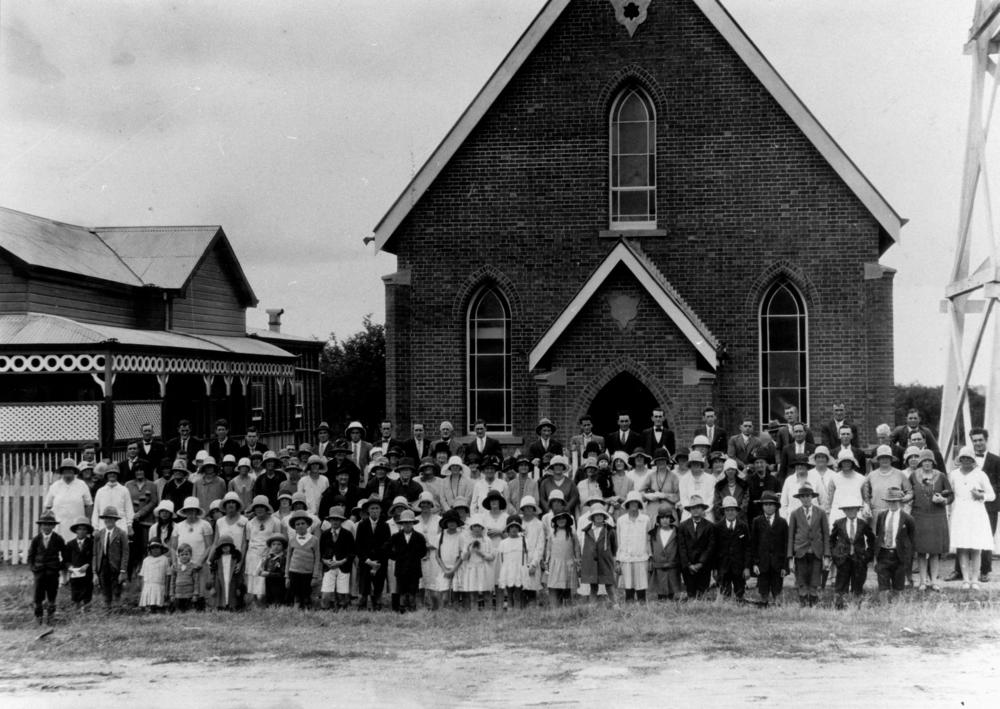
Church of Christ, 1930

The Church of Christ in Charters Towers is a simple brick church with a substantial timber bell tower to one side. The site is located in an early residential part of the city, three blocks from the main commercial street, Gill Street, and nearby to St Mary's Convent and Lissner Park. Being situated on a corner, the bell-tower is prominent above the surrounding cottages.

The rectangular site is located on the corner of Anne and High Streets, and orientated north–south. The rectangular church is centrally located on the site, with the entry to Anne Street to the south. The bell tower is at the street corner to the south-east. To the rear of the site at the northern end is a brick and concrete block community centre.

The church is unpainted brick with steeply pitched corrugated iron roofs. Projecting from the nave is an entry porch to the south, and sanctuary to the north with vestry beside. To each side and above the entry porch are tall narrow lancet windows, with borders of coloured glass. From the entry at ground level, the site falls gently to the rear exposing a base of random granite stones.

The side elevations of the nave are punctuated by brick buttresses, with lancet windows between having awning sashes and heads of coloured glass.

The bell tower is framed and cross-braced in substantial timber members. Its construction is reminiscent of the mining headframes of the area, and similar to the bell tower of St Columba's Catholic Church further along High Street, which is believed to be of later construction. The bell tower has a corrugated iron bellcast pyramid roof, mounted by a finial. It houses two large bells.

The white picket fence runs along the front of the site, and returns part of the way along High Street, past the bell tower.

The interior of the church has exposed scissor trusses with a diagonally boarded ceiling above.

== Heritage listing ==
Church of Christ in Charters Towers was listed on the Queensland Heritage Register on 28 May 1999 having satisfied the following criteria.

The place is important in demonstrating the evolution or pattern of Queensland's history.

The church is a brick building constructed in 1885–7 which demonstrates the development of the Lutheran community in Northern Queensland, particularly Charters Towers in the 1880s.

The place is important because of its aesthetic significance.

The building has aesthetic merit as a simple brick church with Gothic detailing including a steeply pitched roof and lancet windows. The substantial timber bell tower is a prominent element of the streetscape and reminiscent of the construction of mine headframes once common in the area. The juxtaposition of the two distinct and unusual elements contributes to the aesthetic interest of the site.

The place has a strong or special association with a particular community or cultural group for social, cultural or spiritual reasons.

The church, which has been a landmark in Charters Towers since its opening, was an important centre for German cultural and social life for thirty years. The building has social value as a place of public worship for over 110 years. The site has special value to the Church of Christ community with whom it has a long association.

== See also ==
- Wilhelm Iwan, Lutheran historian, who served as a pastor in its Lutheran church days
