= Wilhelm Iwan =

German historian (1871–1958)

Wilhelm Friedrich Iwan
- Portrait provided by his daughter Waltraut Felkendorff.

Personal details
- Born: August 5, 1871 Falkenberg in Upper Silesia, Germany
- Died: May 27, 1958 (aged 86) Wangen in Allgäu, West Germany
- Spouse(s): Hedwig Gertrud Koffmane, b. April 22, 1889 in Kunitz, Silesia, d. September 9, 1954 in Wangen
- Children: Hanna Imhoff, b. March 23, 1913 in Nicolstadt; Helma Iwan, b. December 14, 1914 in Silesia; Waltraut Felkendorff, b. December 1, 1916 in Nicolstadt; Gisela Heinrich, b. November 13, 1921 in Nicolstadt; Adelheid Iwan, b. May 21, 1925 in Nicolstadt
- Profession: Historian, writer, theologian

Wilhelm Iwan, author, historian, and Lutheran theologian lived from 1871 until 1958. As a historian, he documented the 19th century exodus from Prussia (Germany) to America and Australia by a group who sought religious freedom (Old Lutheran schism). In 1945 he fled from his homeland and lived the remainder of his life as a refugee in West Germany.

== Biography ==
=== Early life ===
Wilhelm Friedrich Iwan was born in Falkenberg in the Prussian province of Upper Silesia, on August 5, 1871, as the third of seven sons, to a master builder and brick factory owner, Gottlieb Iwan.

He attended secondary school at Breslau and Hirschberg and graduated valedictorian. He then went on to study theology at the Silesian Frederick William University and the Hallensis in Halle upon Saale.

=== Overseas Experience ===
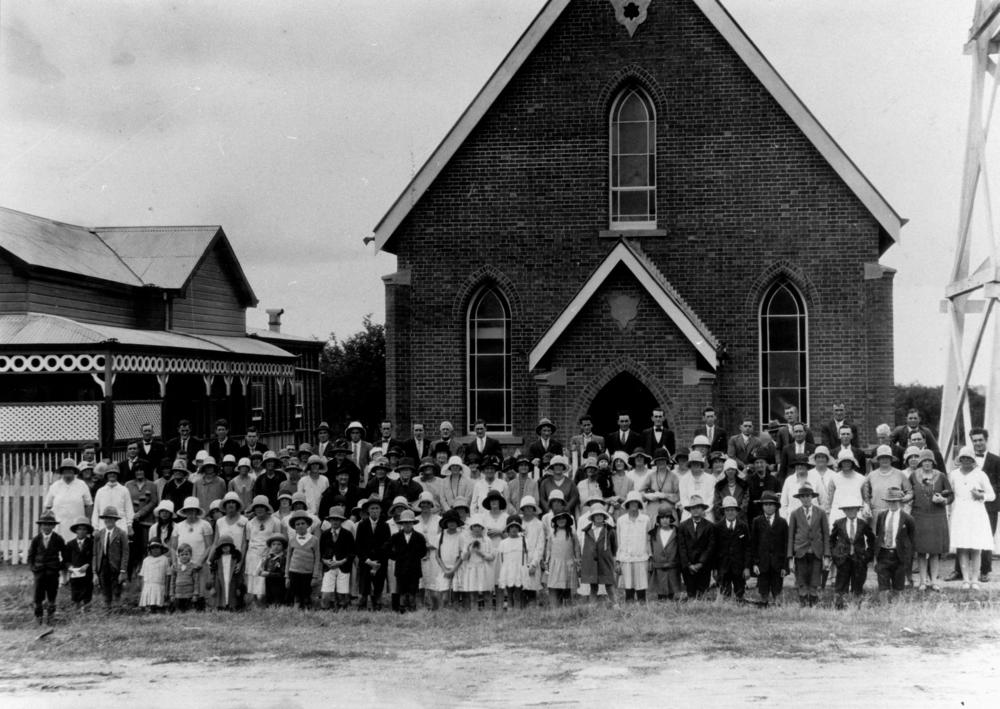
Former Johanneskirche, Charters Towers, after 1916 known as Church of Christ, here 1930

Wilhelm Iwan lived as pastor of a German-speaking congregation in Charters Towers, Australia for nine years, in a church which was founded by German-Australian gold prospectors, and then for three years in Bariloche, Argentina.

↑ Nicolstadt Church as it appeared when Wilhelm Iwan arrived in 1911
↓ and in 2014, converted to Roman Catholicism after 1945

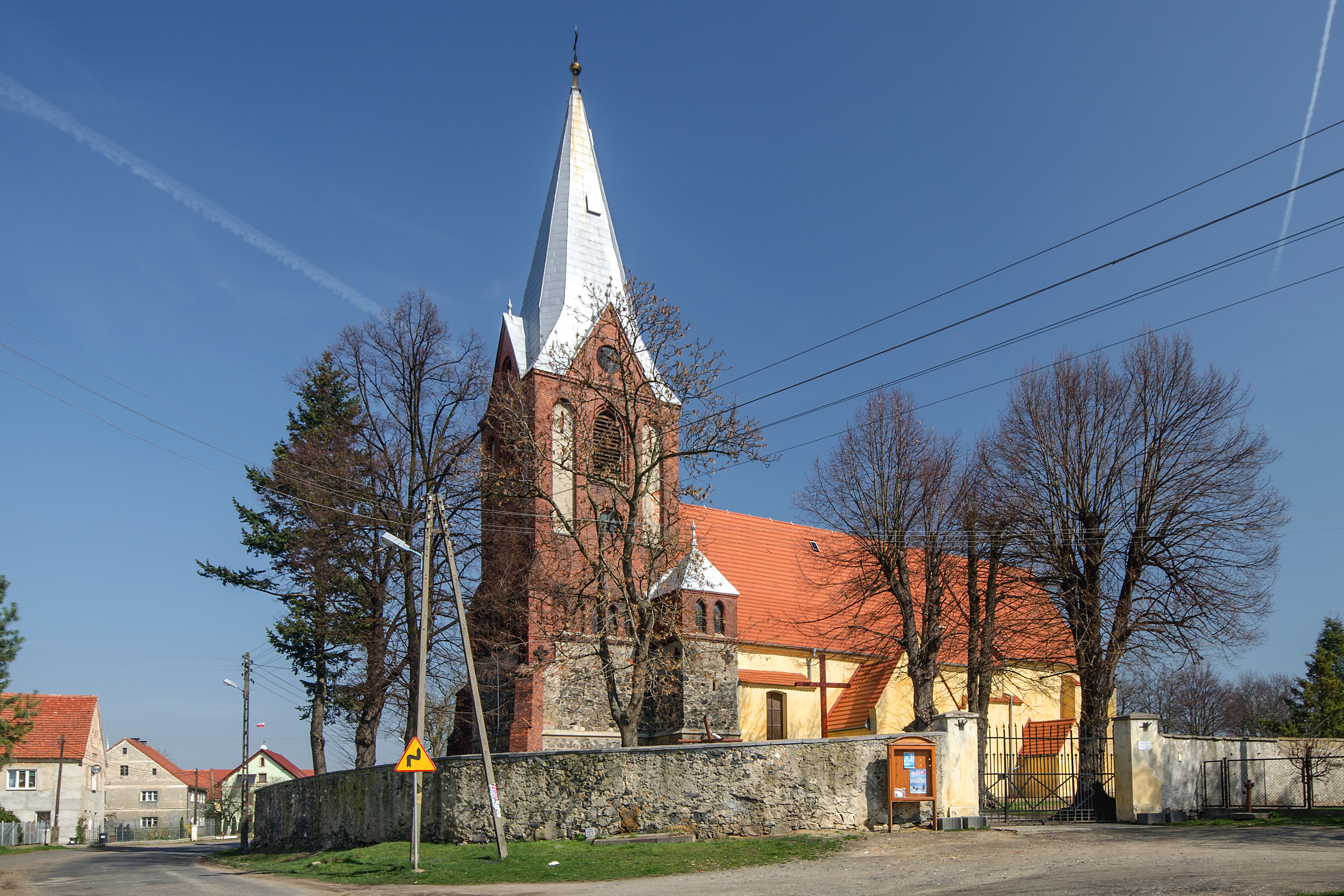

He documented these years in his journals, including accounts of his congregation and his personal experiences. As a collector, he assembled Australian pipes, boomerangs, snake skins, butterflies, glass cages with hummingbirds, cabin trunks full of furs and pelts, poison tipped arrows and stone weapons, tortoise shells, precious gems, and gold dust. He brought these collections to Silesia when he returned.

=== Return to Germany ===
Iwan returned from a life of world travel to Germany in 1911 and soon settled into a new life. In 1912, he married Hedwig Koffmane the daughter of a well-respected Silesian theologian Gustav Koffmane, and together they had five daughters.

The Nicolstadt (also spelled Nikolstadt) congregation, a parish within the Evangelical State Church of Prussia's older Provinces, was his first and also his last in Germany, as he worked for the next 30 years as pastor of the local Lutheran church of the village (map, postcard picture) near Wahlstatt. During this time he wrote several books about the "Old Lutheran emigration" (Auswanderung der Altlutheraner).

=== Contributions as an author and historian ===
published 1931

published 1943

Books and Publications:

- Wilhelm Iwan, Um des Glaubens willen nach Australien, Breslau: Verlag des Lutherischen Büchervereins, 1931
- Wilhelm Iwan, Because of their beliefs: emigration from Prussia to Australia [Uniform title: Um des Glaubens willen nach Australien (Engl.), 1931], David Schubert (trl. and ed.), Highgate, South Australia: H. Schubert, 1995. ISBN 0-646-25324-7

This book relates the story of the emigration of Prussian so-called Old Lutherans to Australia during the period of 1830 to 1850.

- Wilhelm Iwan, Das verfluchte Gold: Selbsterlebnisse unter deutschen Goldgräbern in Australien, Chemnitz: Werner Böhm, 1935; reprint by Adelheid Iwan, Kiel: 1991.

A book of Australian stories based on his personal experiences and the experiences of his Australian acquaintances. This book was to be used as the basis for a movie starring Hans Albers. What came of these plans is not known.

- Wilhelm Iwan, Die Altlutherische Auswanderung um die Mitte des 19. Jahrhunderts: Eine Episode deutscher Auswanderung: 2 vols. (i.e. The Old Lutheran Emigration at the Middle of the 19th Century), Johann-Heß-Institut Breslau (ed.), Ludwigsburg: Eichhornverlag Lothar Kallenberg, 1943, vol. II Appendix (list and statistics of emigrants).

In this book he documents the emigration of Prussian Lutherans to America in the middle of the 19th century. He includes extensive emigrant lists which have become a valuable resource for genealogical research.

- Wilhelm Iwan, Die religiösen Wanderungen in Schlesien, Jahrbuch des Vereins für Schlesische Kirchengeschichte XXIX.Band, Liegnitz: Oscar Heinze, Buchdruckerei und Verlagsanstalt, 1939 .

In this publication he documents the migrations of groups into and out of Schlesien over the time period between 1630 and 1939. He details the religious and political events and influences which motivated the establishment of German settlements in this region.

=== Refugee ===
In 1939, he retired and moved to Breslau hoping for some peaceful years, but at the end of January 1945, towards the end of World War II, as the Russian army was moving into Silesia, he was forced to flee his city on foot taking his ailing wife and his children with him, pulling his luggage behind him on a small sled, leaving behind his books, manuscripts, collections, and property. After several stops, he and his family were fortunate to be taken aboard a hospital train in May 1945, and made the dangerous journey to Lindau on Lake Constance. From there, the refugee office sent them along with other displaced civilians to Wohmbrechts. There they lived under the sponsorship of a farmer by the name of Reichart. Iwan had to earn his keep but was also well treated for five years by the family.

At the age of 80, he succeeded in finding a new home in Wangen im Allgäu where he died on May 27, 1958, aged 86. He is buried together with his wife in the local Sankt Wolfgang cemetery.

=== Places named after Wilhelm Iwan ===
A street in Hamburg, the Wilhelm-Iwan-Ring in the suburb of Allermöhe, is named after him.
