= Bore Sight Range and Compass Swinging Platform at Charters Towers Airfield =

Bore Sight Range and Compass Swinging Platform
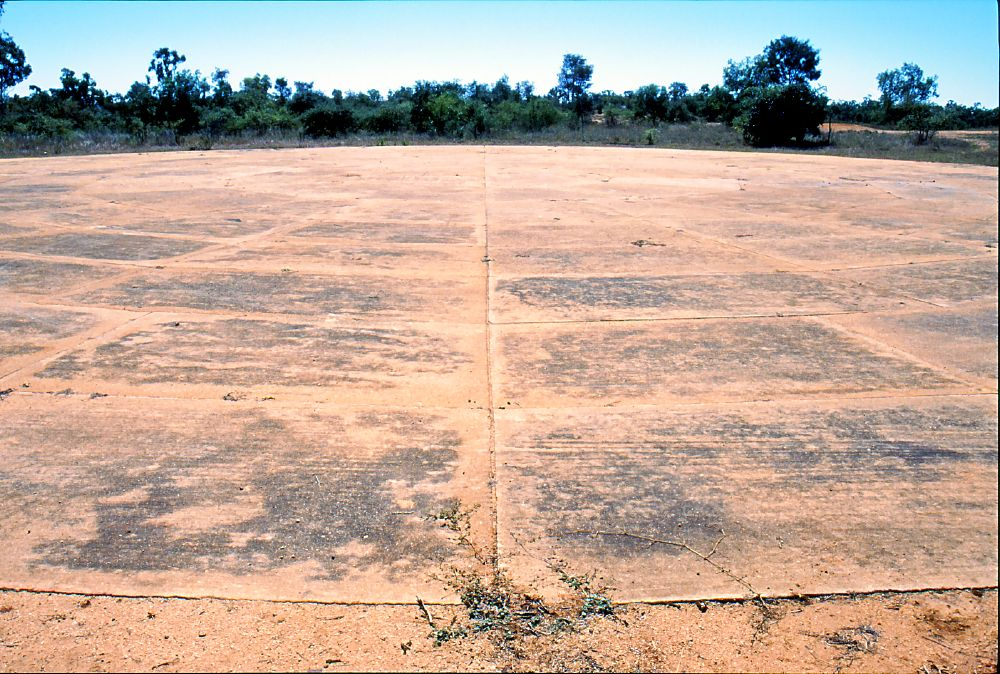
- Compass Swinging Platform

- Location within Queensland Location within Australia
- 20.0389°S 146.27°E
- Location: Charters Towers Airport, Charters Towers, Charters Towers Region, Queensland, Australia

History
- Design period: 1939–1945 (World War II)
- Built: 1942–1943

Queensland Heritage Register
- Official name: Charters Towers Airfield Bore Sight Range and Compass Swinging Platform, Charters Towers WWII Airfield Gun Firing Range and Compass Swinging Station
- Type: state heritage (built)
- Designated: 14 May 2010
- Reference no.: 602739
- Significant period: 1942–1945

The Bore Sight Range and Compass Swinging Platform are a heritage-listed pair of aircraft testing facilities at Charters Towers Airport, Charters Towers, Charters Towers Region, Queensland, Australia. They were built from 1942 to 1943. They are also known as Charters Towers WWII Airfield Gun Firing Range and Compass Swinging Station. They were added to the Queensland Heritage Register on 14 May 2010.

== History ==
Charters Towers Airfield was constructed for the United States Army in early 1942 to provide dispersal facilities for the main Townsville air base at Garbutt, in the event of Japanese air raids during World War II. During 1942 the US 3rd Bombardment Group was based at Charters Towers while undertaking strikes against Japanese bases in the south-west Pacific. From 1943 the airfield served as a US aircraft replacement and training centre. Facilities constructed during this period which remain include a bore sight range (a gun firing range used to check the alignment of the fixed guns of an aircraft) and a compass swinging station (used to check for magnetic deviation in an aircraft compass).

The site of Charters Towers Airfield is said to have been selected about December 1941 by Mr Pettus who was attached to the US Army with the honorary rank of Colonel. As a civilian with the US firm of Sverdrup and Parcel, engineering consultants to the US forces, Pettus was involved in a contour survey of the town for the placement of three runways each 7,000 feet (2,100 m) in length and 150 feet (46 m) wide, which it was optimistically thought would blend in with the Charters Towers street grid and be invisible from the air.

As early as July 1941 the Royal Australian Air Force had ordered a survey of the Charters Towers vicinity to identify sites for airfields to accommodate heavy bombers and combat aircraft and an initial survey was undertaken during September. This survey resulted in the selection of suitable airfield sites at Corinda (now Columbia), Sandy Creek (now Breddan) and several locations near Sellheim.

On 7 December 1941 Japanese aircraft made a surprise attack on the US naval base at Pearl Harbor in the Hawaiian Islands. At the same time Japanese forces launched assaults on Thailand, the Philippines and the British colony of Malaya. Three days after Pearl Harbor, two capital ships of the Royal Navy were sunk off the coast of Malaya. This gave the Japanese almost total control of the seas to Australia's north. The sudden fall of Singapore on 15 February 1942 and the rapid, unchecked Japanese advance through the islands of the Netherlands East Indies raised fears of the invasion of Australia and aerial attacks on Queensland bases.

Charters Towers was the closest inland centre that could provide strategic support and aircraft dispersal facilities for the main North Eastern Area air base at Garbutt, Townsville, which was considered vulnerable to Japanese attack.

The RAAF ordered commencement of preliminary work on the Charters Towers town aerodrome during January 1942, with the grading of three temporary landing strips for use while the main aerodrome was under construction (two landing grounds were cleared on football fields and one near the cemetery).

By early February 1942 the airfield project had been accorded priority by the RAAF with a request that the NE-SW runway be graded first followed by the north-south runway. To get the project underway while awaiting the original plans, the airfield site was resurveyed by Main Roads Commission (MRC) engineers at Charters Towers and the layout was amended slightly.

Construction of Charters Towers airfield began in earnest on Monday 16 February 1942. Deadline for completion of the first strip was 14 days. Hundreds of men and all available earth-moving plant were brought in from Townsville and the first gravel strip was completed in 17 days. Grading of the second runway was completed soon after.

To speed base construction and foil Japanese aerial reconnaissance, all houses in the vicinity of the airfield were taken over so that personnel could be housed as inconspicuously as possible.

The airfield became operational during March with arrival of the first of four bombardment squadrons of the US Army Air Force 3rd Bombardment Group (Light), equipped with A-24 Dauntless dive bombers which had been intended for the Philippines. The group was later equipped with A-20 Boston medium bombers. These aircraft were followed by the arrival of B-25 Mitchell bombers that had been intended for use by the Dutch in the Netherlands East Indies, but were taken over by the Americans.

At Charters Towers, the cost for construction of runways, taxiways, hardstands, dispersal areas and all buildings and facilities was the responsibility of the US Army Services of Supply, Base Section Two. Works were ordered by the US Army through the federal Co-ordinator-General, Department of Public Works and contracted through the Department of Interior and Allied Works Council to the MRC for supervision.

In July 1942 the NE-SW runway (known as Runway 45, later Runway 56) was sealed and the north-south runway (known as Runway 7, later Runway 9) was metalled. The MRC used local mine tailings for the runways prompting a US press report that they were "paved with gold".

During 1942 Charters Towers airfield became instrumental in the development of the B-25 "Strafer". Experimentation began with the replacement of four fixed 30 calibre machine guns in the nose section of the A-20 Boston, with heavier 50 calibre machine guns which were found to be more effective for low level ground and shipping attack. This led to conversion of the B-25 Mitchell "bombardier nose" to a "gunnery nose". The B-25 conversion involved the fitting of eight fixed forward firing 50 calibre machine guns. The early B-25 "Strafer" conversions were carried out at Eagle Farm, Brisbane, on aircraft of 3 BG(M) operating from Charters Towers in low level strikes against Japanese shipping in Rabaul Harbour and airfields and bases in New Guinea. The B-25 "Strafer" conversion, initiated in North Queensland, was quickly adopted in all US theatres of World War II.

Following the transfer of 3 BG(M) to New Guinea in November 1942, Charters Towers airfield served through most of 1943 as a US Fighter and Bomber Command Replacement Training Centre.

During mid-February 1943 the Department of Public Works received a requisition from the US Army for construction of a gun firing range, or bore sight range, platform at Charters Towers airfield to test the accuracy of aircraft fixed armament. The work order was lodged with the superintending engineer, Department of Interior, Townsville. The concrete gun firing platform was designed with an adjustable metal plate set in front of the concrete block to take the nose wheel of aircraft with tricycle undercarriages, such as the B-25. A steel gantry frame with a sling was positioned on the platform to lift the tail of fighter aircraft with tail wheels such as the P-40. The bore sight range extended about 360 metres (1,180 ft) to an earth mound, or butt, in front of which a target was set.

It was probably during this early period of 1943 that a compass swinging station, or platform, was constructed on the northern side of the NE-SW runway near its central point. No record of the date of construction has been located. The platform was a circular concrete slab, 120 feet 6 inches (36.73 m) in diameter with a compass rose inscribed on its surface. Aircraft were pushed onto the platform and aligned with each of the 16 main cardinal points of the compass, starting with north. Variations in aircraft compass bearings were noted and compass magnets were adjusted.

The RAAF resumed responsibility for the maintenance of the airfield in May 1944. The US withdrawal was signalled in June 1944 when the Charters Towers Airfield was classified as a "reserve airdrome". Most of the US facilities at the airfield were turned over to the RAAF in December 1944. The Department of Civil Aviation was advised by the Department of Air in January 1946 that the RAAF planned to retain responsibility for Charters Towers airfield in the post-war period. RAAF responsibility has long since lapsed and today the airfield is operated by the Charters Towers Regional Council.

== Description ==
The Charters Towers Airfield (now Charters Towers Airport) is located on the northern outskirts of Charters Towers in the suburb of Columbia.

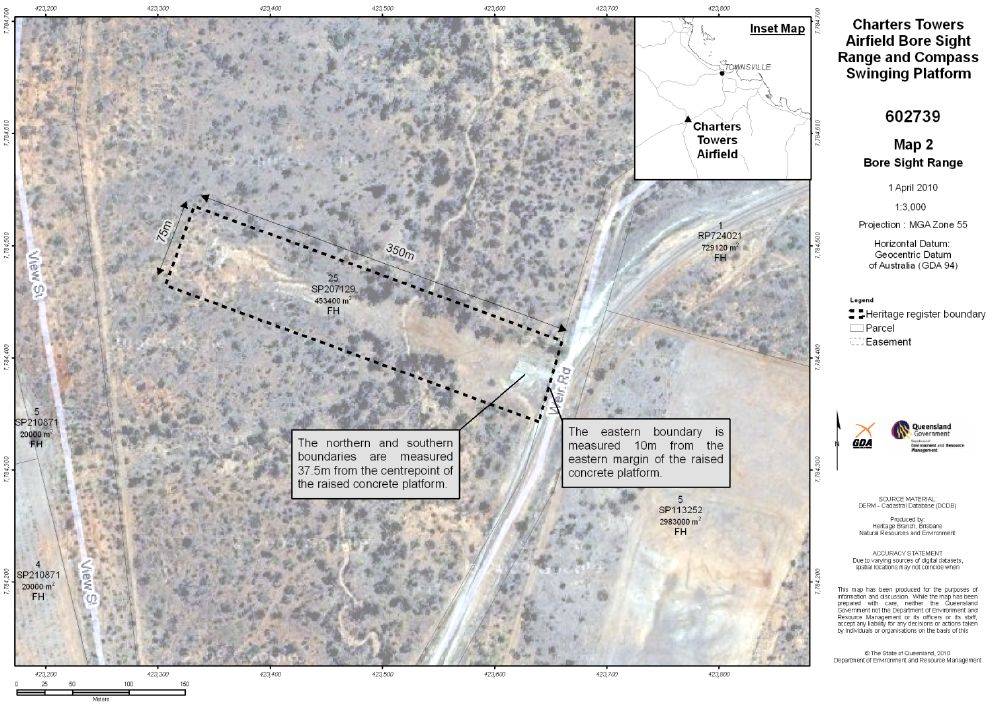
Aerial view of the Bore Sight Range, 2010

=== Bore Sight Range ===
Aligned approximately east-west off the northern end of the wartime north-south runway (in the adjacent suburb of Toll), the Bore Sight Range includes an aircraft hardstand in the form of a raised concrete platform approximately 15 metres (49 ft) square. A steel tie down shackle is set into the concrete surface. An adjustable metal plate, which can be raised or lowered, is set at the front of the raised hardstand to carry the nose wheel of aircraft fitted with tricycle undercarriages. A cleared range extends east about 360 metres (1,180 ft) from the hardstand to the original earth butt, in front of which a recent display target is set.

=== Compass Swinging Platform ===
The Compass Swinging Platform is located about 850 metres (2,790 ft) south-east of the Bore Sight Range's hardstand (in the suburb of Columbia), on the northern side of the wartime NE- SW runway, near its central point. It comprises a circular concrete slab 120 feet 6 inches (36.73 m) in diameter with a compass rose inscribed on the surface.

== Heritage listing ==
The Bore Sight Range and Compass Swinging Platform at Charters Towers Airfield were listed on the Queensland Heritage Register on 14 May 2010 having satisfied the following criteria.

The place is important in demonstrating the evolution or pattern of Queensland's history.

They are significant as surviving evidence of a major United States Fifth Air Force Aircraft Replacement and Training Centre developed for the Townsville region during World War II.

They are significant for their role in the operation of the US Replacement and Training Centre and in the conduct of the air war in the South West Pacific Area in association with the nearby RAAF aircraft repair and salvage installation at Breddan Airfield.

The place demonstrates rare, uncommon or endangered aspects of Queensland's cultural heritage.

The Bore Site Range is the only known example of its type in Queensland with an adjustable nose wheel platform to accommodate aircraft such as the Bell P-39 Airacobra, A-20 Boston, B-25 Mitchell "Strafer", and Martin B-26 Marauder.

The place is important in demonstrating the principal characteristics of a particular class of cultural places.

The Bore Sight Range and Compass Swinging Platform remain substantially intact and are important in demonstrating the principal characteristics of their types. The bore sight range retains its concrete hardstand, cleared range and earth butt. The circular concrete slab of the compass swinging platform remains adjacent to the wartime runway, and retains its compass rose inscription.
