= Columbia, Queensland =

Columbia
- Suburb
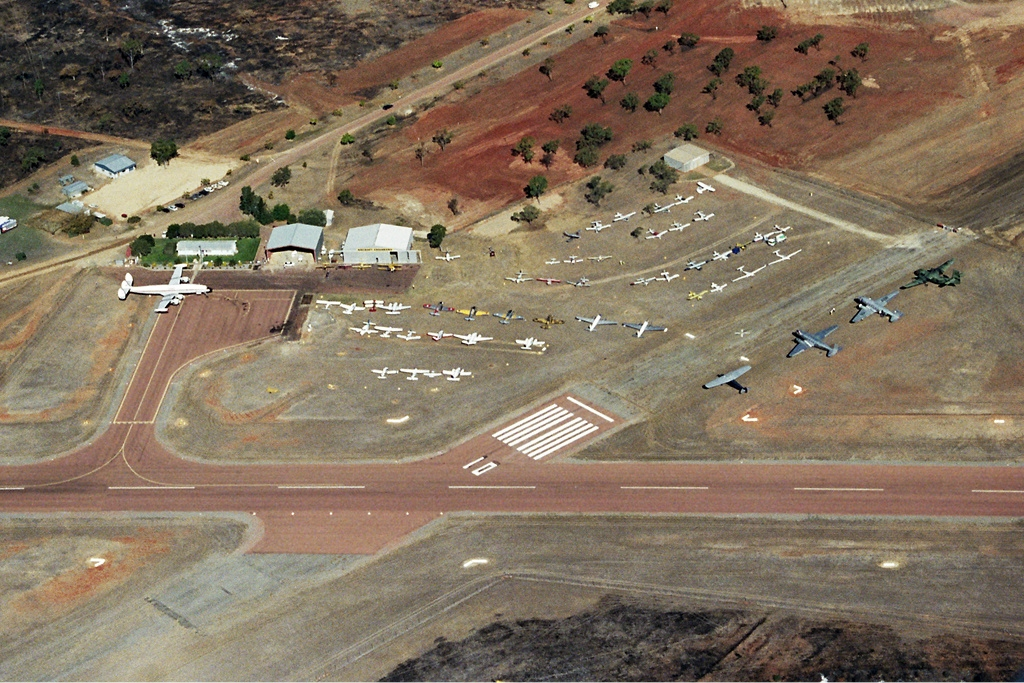
- Charters Towers Airport at Columbia

- Interactive map of Columbia
- Coordinates: 20.0491°S 146.2808°E
- Country: Australia
- State: Queensland
- LGA: Charters Towers Region
- Location: 3.9 km (2.4 mi) NNE of Charters Towers CBD; 137 km (85 mi) SW of Townsville; 1,312 km (815 mi) NNW of Brisbane

Government
  - State electorate: Traeger
  - Federal division: Kennedy

Area
  - Total: 8.7 km^{2} (3.4 sq mi)

Population
  - Total: 97 (2021 census)
  - Density: 11.15/km^{2} (28.88/sq mi)
- Time zone: UTC+10:00 (AEST)
- Postcode: 4820
Suburbs around Columbia
| Toll | Breddan | Breddan |
| Toll | Columbia | Breddan |
| Richmond Hill | Richmond Hill | Broughton |

Columbia is a rural locality in the Charters Towers Region, Queensland, Australia. In the 2021 census, Columbia had a population of 97 people.

== Geography ==
Charters Towers Airport occupies the west of the locality (20.0465°S 146.2729°E).There are two airstrips. The main one is sealed and The main runway is 1,736 metres (5,696 ft) long and sealed. There is no control tower but there is pilot-activated lighting available. The second airstrip is unsealed. Refuelling facilities are available.

Charters Towers racecourse is in the south of the locality and is accessed from Hackett Terrace (20.0580°S 146.276009°E).

== History ==
Dalrymple Trade Training Centre was officially opened on 13 April 2014 by Senator Ian Macdonald.

== Demographics ==
In the 2016 census Columbia had a population of 101 people.

In the 2021 census, Columbia had a population of 97 people.

== Heritage listings ==
Charters Towers has a number of heritage-listed sites, including:

- Bore Sight Range and Compass Swinging Platform, at Charters Towers Airport

== Education ==
Dalrymple Trade Training Centre is a secondary (10-12) education unit at 1-13 Macpherson Street (20.0570°S 146.2658°E). It operates in conjunction with secondary schools in the Charters Towers area to provide vocational training in purpose-built, fully-equipped, modern premises.

There are no mainstream schools in Columbia. The nearest government primary school is Richmond Hill State School in neighbouring Richmond Hill to the south-west. The nearest government secondary school is Charters Towers State High School in Charters Towers CBD to the south-west. There are also a number of non-government schools in Charters Towers.
