= Tambo Court House =

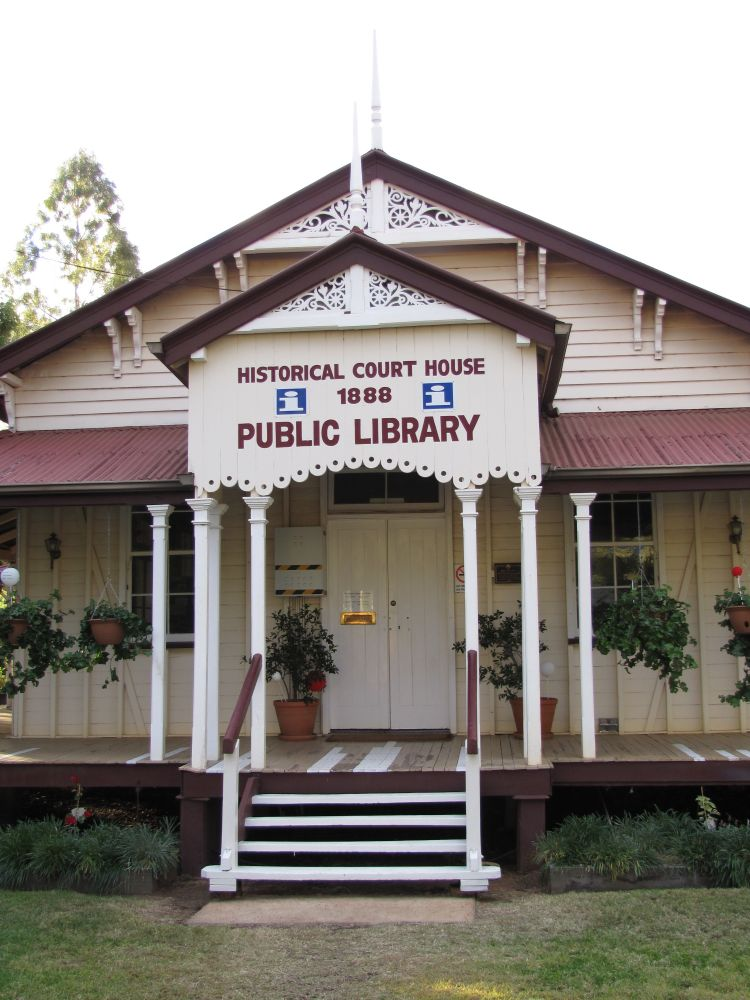
- Tambo Court House, 2013

- Location within Queensland
- 24.8822°S 146.2563°E
- Location: 9 Arthur Street, Tambo, Blackall-Tambo Region, Queensland, Australia

History
- Design period: 1870s–1890s (late 19th century)
- Built: 1887–1897

Site notes
- Architectural style: Classicism

Queensland Heritage Register
- Official name: Tambo Court House (former), Tambo Shire Council Library
- Type: state heritage (built)
- Designated: 21 October 1992
- Reference no.: 600834
- Significant period: 1880s–1890s (historical); 1887–1890s (fabric); 1887–1983 (social)
- Significant components: court house, office/s

Tambo Court House is a heritage-listed former courthouse and now library at 9 Arthur Street, Tambo, Blackall-Tambo Region, Queensland, Australia. It was built from 1887 to 1897. It is also known as Tambo Shire Council Library. It was added to the Queensland Heritage Register on 21 October 1992.

== History ==
The former courthouse at Tambo is a timber building that was constructed in 1888 and was used for judicial purposes until 1983. It has housed the Tambo Shire Council Library since 1991.

Thomas Mitchell first explored the area in 1846 and following subsequent exploration in 1858 by Augustus Charles Gregory and by William Landsborough and Nathaniel Buchanan in 1860, the first pastoral run in the area was taken up in 1861 to be soon followed by others. By 1864 most pastoral land in the area had been taken up.

Tambo was the first township on the Barcoo River, the settlement having begun with the establishment of an inn when a license was granted for the Barcoo Club hotel in 1864. A town reserve on the site was proclaimed as "Carrangarra".

The area developed quickly developed and in December 1864, Dr William Boyd was appointed Police Magistrate for the Mitchell District. A Clerk of Petty Sessions was appointed to Carrangarra in 1866 and in 1867 the town also had a Police Sergeant. In 1868 the town was surveyed and renamed Tambo. The first land sales were held in the following year although 50 people and 34 buildings were already present in the budding township. A mail service had been established in 1866 at the Royal Carrangarra Hotel with the publican as postmaster, but in 1874 a telegraph line was opened between Springsure and Tambo, making the town a key part of the communications network link with western Queensland. Further telegraph lines were opened to Charleville and to Blackall within a few years.

A building boom occurred in the 1870s during which a hospital, bank, post office, school and courthouse were constructed. The 1874 courthouse soon proved inadequate and tenders were called on 18 November 1886 for a new building. The contract was awarded to F W Bates on 1 January 1887 at a price of £1068. The new court was built to a standard plan, with a large courtroom surrounded by verandahs on three sides, placed at right angles to a row of offices at the rear. It is similar to surviving courthouses at Charleville and Mitchell. In February 1888, the people of Tambo petitioned the Colonial Secretary to have the courtroom furnished with a removable magistrate's bench, jury and witness stands so that the space could also be used for balls and other public events, there being no other public building in the town. The courthouse was ready for occupation by September 1888.

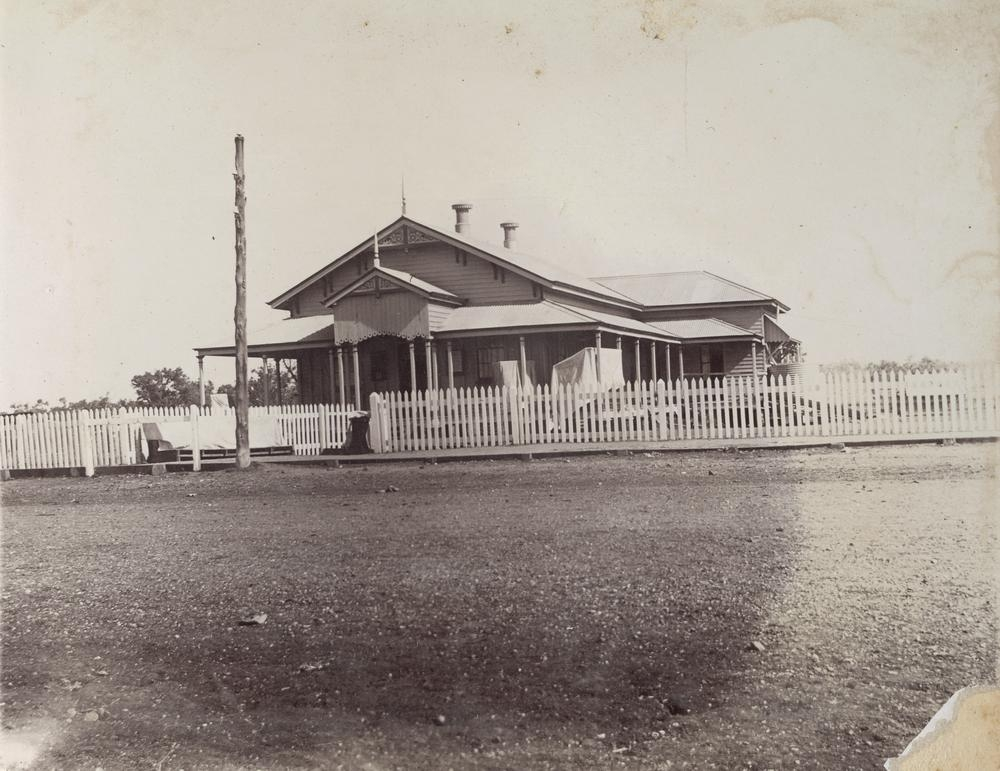
Tambo Court House, circa 1902

By 1897 the Lands Office, which shared the courthouse, needed more space to conduct its business. An additional office was added to the rear of the courthouse which provided an office and counter area. Other work carried out on the building over the years was largely maintenance and little change occurred.

The Tambo Shire Council acquired the building in 1983 following the erection of a new police station and court house in Tambo. In August 1991 the Tambo Shire Council Library was relocated into the former court house, which had been adapted for library purposes. The following year the offices at the rear were renovated to accommodate the Community Care Group.

== Description ==
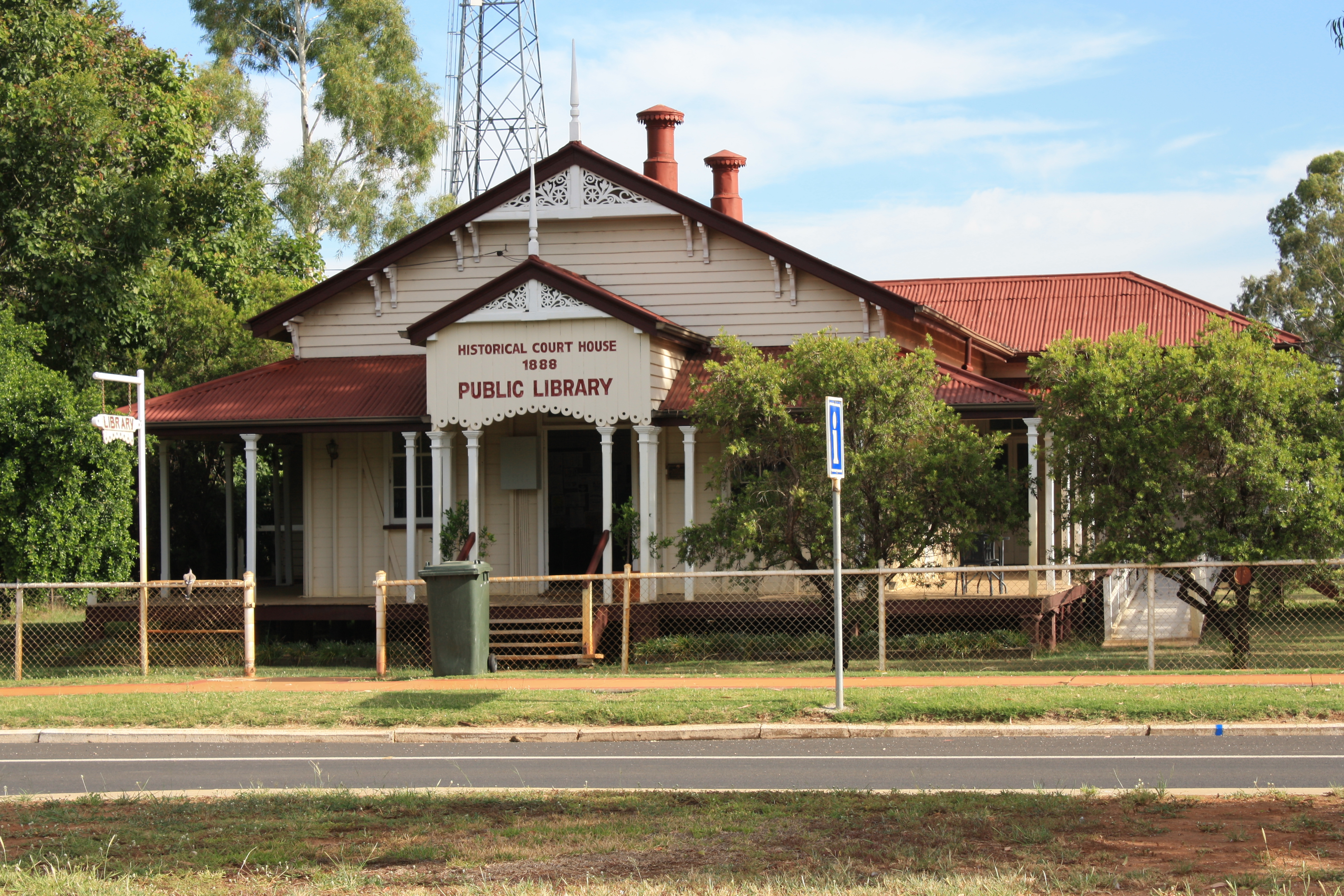
Tambo Public Library, 2012

The former Tambo Court House is a single-storey timber building with a hipped roof clad in corrugated iron with gables to the front elevation and over the main entrance. The building is T shaped in plan with the large rectangular courtroom set at right angles to a row of four offices to the rear, one of which has been converted into toilets. A verandah encloses the courtroom on three sides and is shaded by an awning supported on timber posts. A projecting decorative portico marks the entrance to the building, which is approached by low steps. A ramp has been constructed to the side of the building leading to the verandah.

The building has been refitted to suit use as a library but some of the original furniture survives including the Magistrate's Bench and Witness Box.

== Heritage listing ==
The former Tambo Court House was listed on the Queensland Heritage Register on 21 October 1992 having satisfied the following criteria.

The place is important in demonstrating the evolution or pattern of Queensland's history.

The former Court House Tambo is part of the pattern of development of Queensland's history as evidence of the importance of Tambo when it was the main communication point and administrative centre in western Queensland north of Charleville.

The place is important in demonstrating the principal characteristics of a particular class of cultural places.

The former Courthouse is a good example of a small regional courthouse of its era, having a large courtroom with offices for magistrates and court officials to the rear in a T plan that was a standard plan for rural courthouses from the mid-nineteenth century until World War II.

The place is important because of its aesthetic significance.

The former Courthouse has architectural and aesthetic significance as one of a series of public buildings along the main street of Tambo, including the three successive post offices and the shire hall, which define the visual character of the township.

The place has a strong or special association with a particular community or cultural group for social, cultural or spiritual reasons.

The former Court House Tambo has had a long connection with the people of Tambo and the surrounding district as the focus for the administration of justice, a venue for public events and as a public library.
