= Charters Towers =

- Town
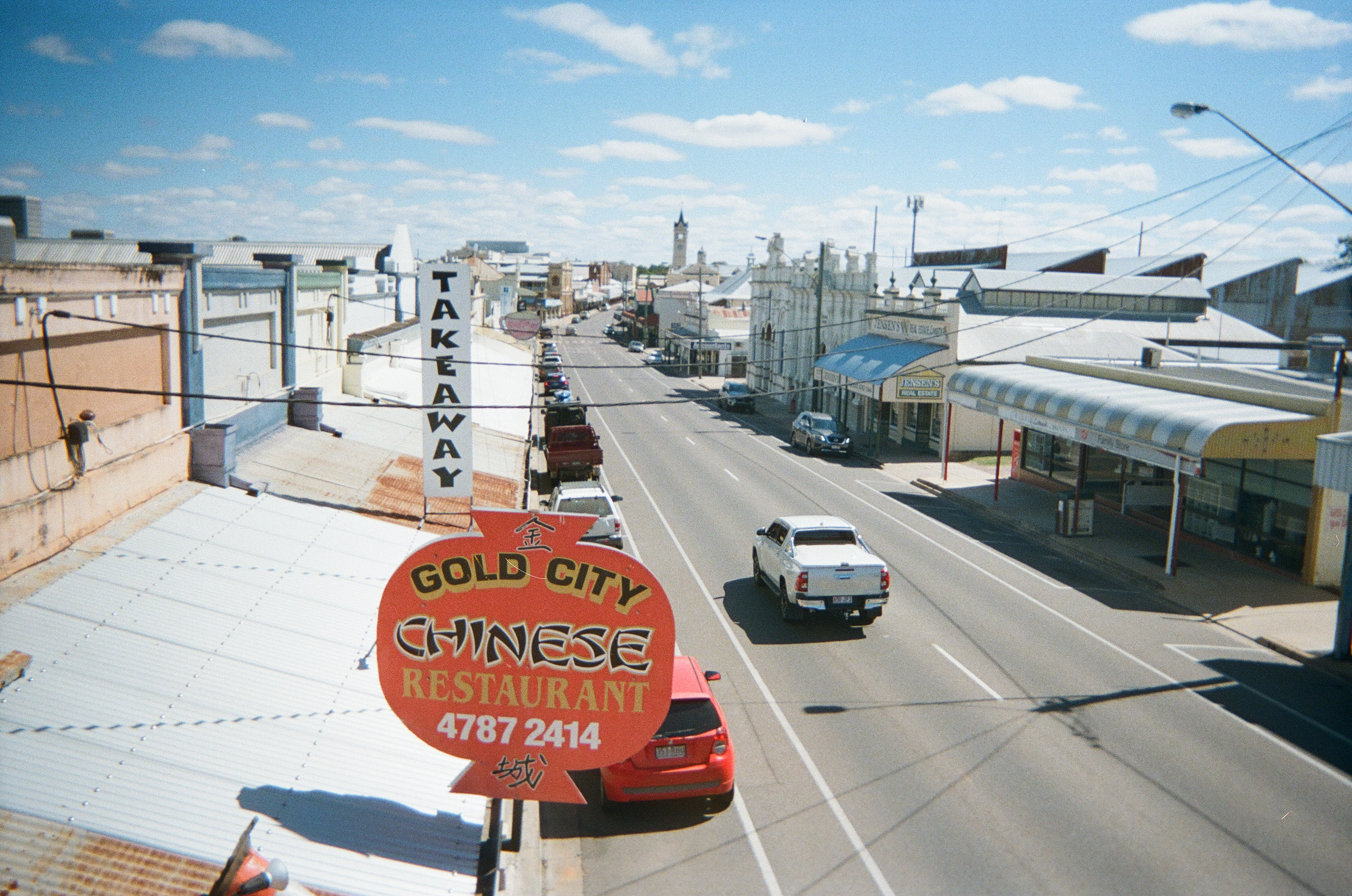
- View of Gill Street

- Coordinates: 20.0765°S 146.2614°E
- Country: Australia
- State: Queensland
- Region: North Queensland
- LGA: Charters Towers Region
- Location: 136 km (85 mi) SW of Townsville; 1,309 km (813 mi) NNW of Brisbane; 248 km (154 mi) ENE of Hughenden

Government
  - State electorate: Traeger
  - Federal division: Kennedy
- Elevation: 310 m (1,020 ft)

Population
  - Total: 8,040 (2021 census)
- Time zone: UTC+10:00 (AEST)
- Postcode: 4820
- County: Davenport
- Mean max temp: 30.3 °C (86.5 °F)
- Mean min temp: 17.7 °C (63.9 °F)
- Annual rainfall: 659.5 mm (25.96 in)

Charters Towers is a rural town in the Charters Towers Region, Queensland, Australia. It is 136 km (85 mi) by road south-west from Townsville on the Flinders Highway. During the last quarter of the 19th century, the town boomed as the rich gold deposits under the city were developed. After becoming uneconomical in the 20th century, profitable mining operations have commenced once again. In the 2021 census, the town of Charters Towers had a population of 8,040 people.

== Geography ==
The urban area of the town of Charters Towers includes its suburbs: Charters Towers City (the centre of the city); Richmond Hill, Toll, and Columbia to the north, Queenton to the east, Grand Secret and Alabama Hill to the west, and Towers Hill, Mosman Park, and Millchester to the south.

Charters Towers township is only mildly elevated at 290 metres or 950 feet above sea-level, but this has a noticeable effect, with lower humidity and wider temperature variations compared to nearby Townsville. Charters Towers obtains its water supply from the nearby Burdekin River.

== Climate ==
Charters Towers experiences a tropical semi-arid climate (Koppen: BSh), with a short wet season from November to March and a long dry season from April to October, with cooler nights and lower humidity. The average annual rainfall is 649.9 millimetres (25.59 in), primarily concentrated in the austral summer. Extreme temperatures in Charters Towers have ranged from 44.9 °C (112.8 °F) on 6 January 1994 to 1.1 °C (34.0 °F) on 5 July 1899.

Record temperatures were combined from the old Post Office weather station (1893–1992) and the current Airport weather station (1992–2024).

Climate data for Charters Towers (20º02'24"S, 146º16'12"E, 290 m AMSL) (1992–2024 normals, extremes 1893–2024)
Month	Jan	Feb	Mar	Apr	May	Jun	Jul	Aug	Sep	Oct	Nov	Dec	Year
Record high °C (°F)	44.9 (112.8)	42.7 (108.9)	42.3 (108.1)	38.8 (101.8)	35.0 (95.0)	32.8 (91.0)	34.4 (93.9)	36.1 (97.0)	39.4 (102.9)	41.5 (106.7)	43.4 (110.1)	44.7 (112.5)	44.9 (112.8)
Mean daily maximum °C (°F)	33.8 (92.8)	33.0 (91.4)	32.2 (90.0)	30.4 (86.7)	27.4 (81.3)	25.1 (77.2)	25.0 (77.0)	26.9 (80.4)	30.4 (86.7)	33.1 (91.6)	34.2 (93.6)	34.7 (94.5)	30.5 (86.9)
Mean daily minimum °C (°F)	22.4 (72.3)	22.3 (72.1)	21.0 (69.8)	18.4 (65.1)	15.2 (59.4)	12.8 (55.0)	11.7 (53.1)	12.3 (54.1)	15.2 (59.4)	18.2 (64.8)	20.5 (68.9)	21.9 (71.4)	17.7 (63.8)
Record low °C (°F)	14.7 (58.5)	14.8 (58.6)	12.8 (55.0)	8.8 (47.8)	4.2 (39.6)	1.4 (34.5)	0.1 (32.2)	1.7 (35.1)	4.4 (39.9)	6.1 (43.0)	10.0 (50.0)	14.2 (57.6)	0.1 (32.2)
Average precipitation mm (inches)	157.3 (6.19)	137.8 (5.43)	75.5 (2.97)	29.6 (1.17)	28.1 (1.11)	18.1 (0.71)	24.0 (0.94)	14.0 (0.55)	8.8 (0.35)	18.2 (0.72)	60.7 (2.39)	78.3 (3.08)	649.9 (25.59)
Average precipitation days (≥ 1.0 mm)	9.1	8.4	6.3	3.5	2.8	2.4	1.9	1.2	1.3	2.3	4.7	5.6	49.5
Average afternoon relative humidity (%)	48	53	46	44	44	43	39	35	33	33	37	41	41
Average dew point °C (°F)	18.6 (65.5)	19.3 (66.7)	17.1 (62.8)	14.6 (58.3)	12.2 (54.0)	9.7 (49.5)	7.9 (46.2)	7.8 (46.0)	9.7 (49.5)	12.1 (53.8)	14.4 (57.9)	16.7 (62.1)	13.3 (56.0)
Source: Bureau of Meteorology (1992–2024 normals, extremes 1893–2024)

== History ==
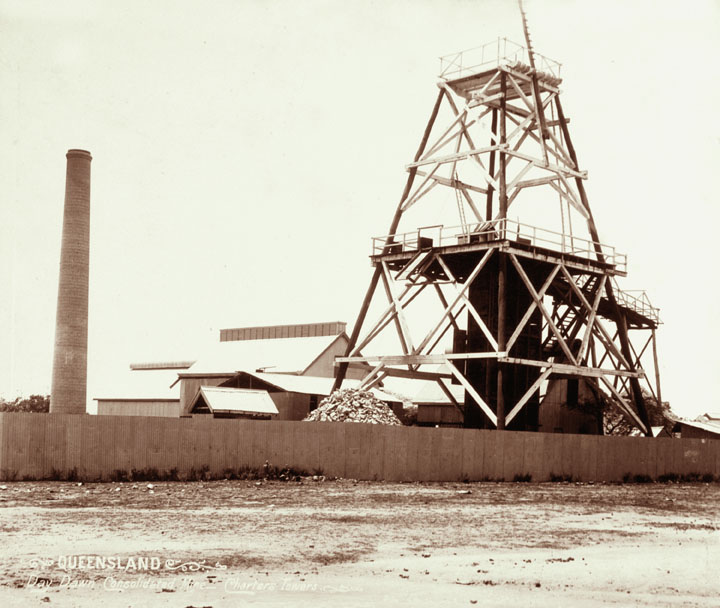
Mining operations, circa 1897

The town was founded in the 1870s when gold was discovered by chance at Towers Hill on Christmas Eve 1871 by 12-year-old Aboriginal boy, Jupiter Mosman. Jupiter was with a small group of prospectors including Hugh Mosman, James Fraser, and George Clarke. Their horses bolted after a flash of lightning. While he was searching, Jupiter found both the horses and a nugget of gold in a creek at the base of Towers Hill. Charters originated from the Gold Commissioner, WSEM Charters. Ten major gold reefs were eventually mined.

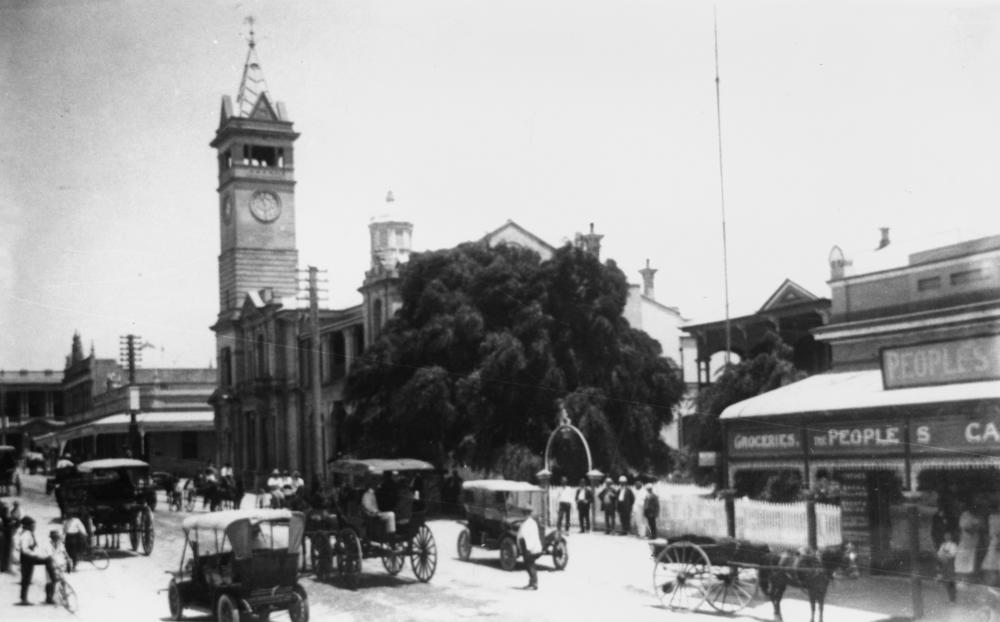
Gill Street with the Post Office tower, circa 1914

Such were the boom years, between 1872 and 1899, that Charters Towers hosted its own stock exchange. The Great Northern Railway between Charters Towers and the coastal port of Townsville was completed in December 1882. During this period, the population was 27,500, making Charters Towers Queensland's largest city outside of Brisbane. The city was also affectionately known as "The World", as anything one might desire reportedly could be had in the Towers, leaving no reason to travel elsewhere.

The Borough of Charters Towers was proclaimed on 21 June 1877 under the Municipal Institutions Act 1864 with John McDonald being elected the town's first mayor. The local government area would later be known as Town of Charters Towers and City of Charters Towers, before being absorbed into the Charters Towers Region.

Charters Towers Post Office opened on 17 May 1872.

A 20 head of stamps mill began ore-crushing operations on 16 July 1872. The Venus Battery continued to be used by small mine in the region until 1971. The unique site remains intact today, together with a cyanide treatment plant and assay office.

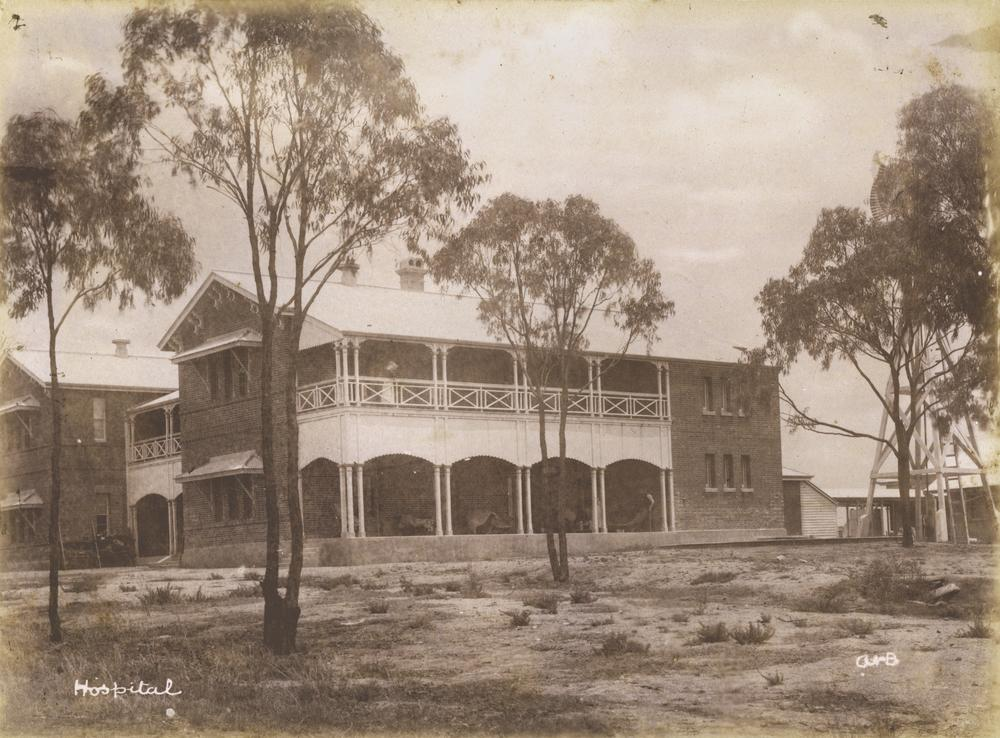
Hospital, circa 1888

On Sunday 10 August 1884, the new Charters Towers District Hospital opened. During 1888–89, the Charters Towers Stock Exchange and Royal Arcade were constructed at the northern end of Gill Street for local businessman and civic leader Alexander Malcolm.

By 1917, gold mining became uneconomical. During World War I, labour was hard to find, and as the mines drove deeper, ventilation and water problems arose. This production decline was similar across Australian gold mines, with rising costs and a fixed gold price eroding profitability. The town entered a long period of relative stagnation and little further development has occurred since.

The Charters Towers gold field produced over 200 tonnes (6.6 million troy ounces) of gold from 1871 to 1917. The gold is concentrated into veins, and was Australia's richest major field with an average grade of 34 grams per tonne. The grade was almost double that of Victorian mines and almost 75% higher than the grades of Western Australian (Kalgoorlie) gold fields of that time.

In 1935, Clermont-Charters Towers was an important line for public telephone communications.

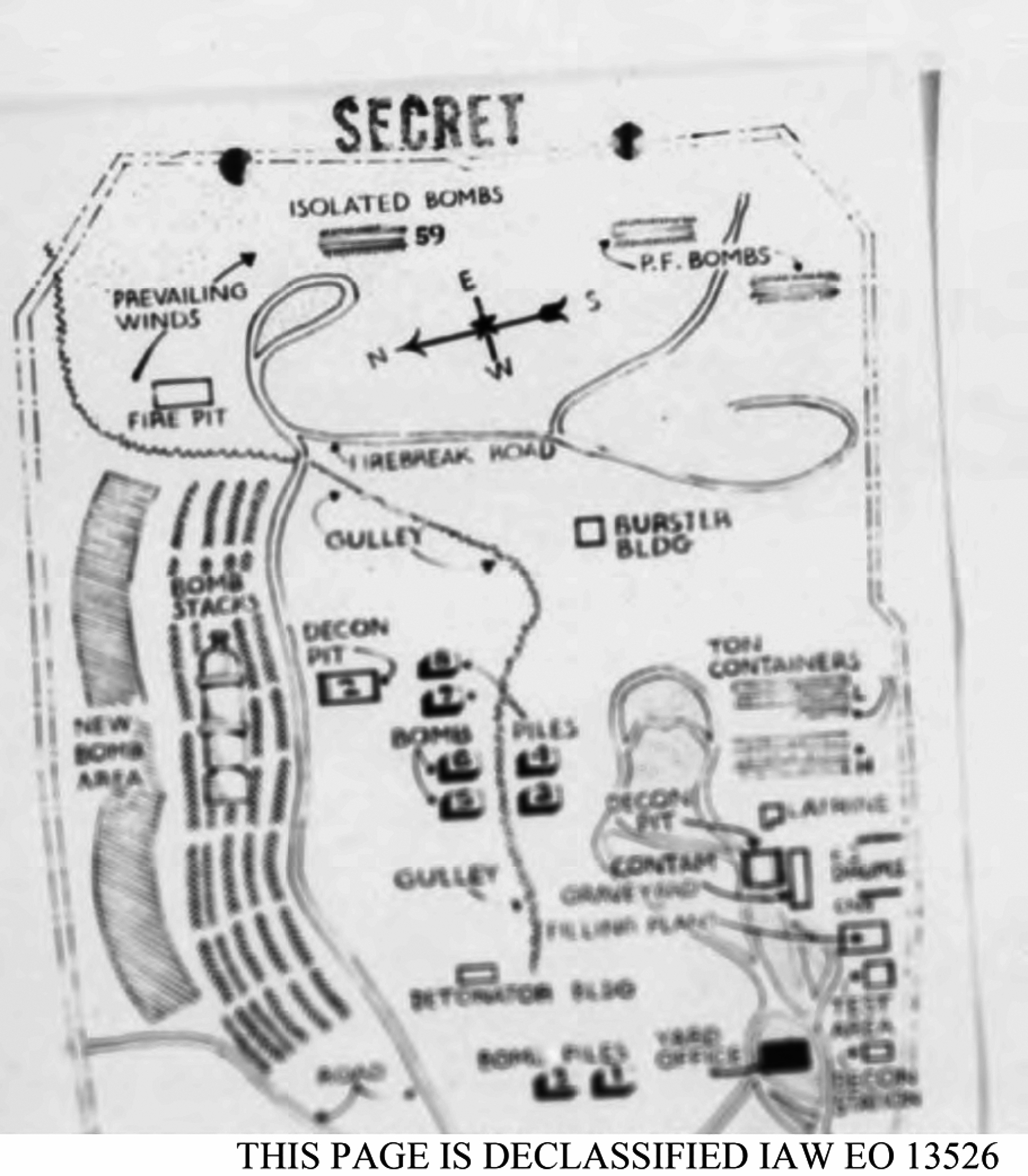
Map of the WWII "US Chemical Bomb Depot

During World War II, Charters Towers was the location of RAAF No.9 Inland Aircraft Fuel Depot (IAFD), completed in 1942 and closed on 29 August 1944. Usually consisting of four tanks, 31 fuel depots were built across Australia for the storage and supply of aircraft fuel for the RAAF and the US Army Air Forces at a total cost of £900,000 ($1,800,000).

Beginning in June 1943, Charters Towers was also the location for a major USAAF chemical bomb depot operated by the 760th Chemical Depot Company (Aviation). The depot contained bombs filled with mustard agent, cyanogen chloride and other toxic chemicals. In addition to maintaining the depot, the 760th cooperated with the Australian Chemical Warfare Research Unit to conduct research on bomb design and delivery techniques. Late in 1944, the depot and its contents were moved to Oro Bay, New Guinea.

== Demographics ==
In the 2016 census, the town of Charters Towers had a population of 8,120 people.

In the 2021 census, the town of Charters Towers had a population of 8,040 people.

== Heritage listings ==
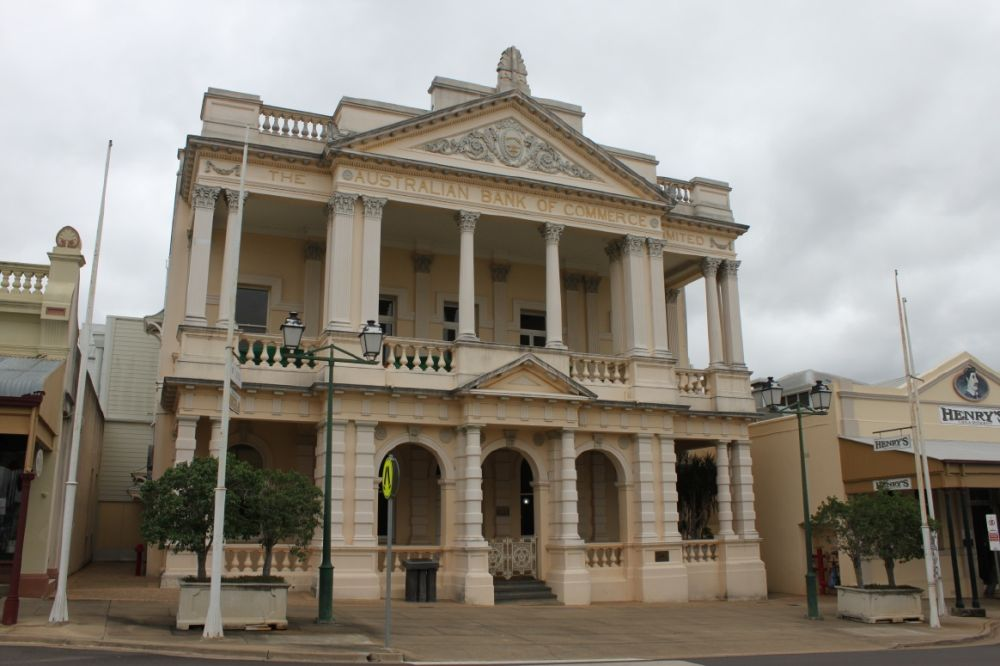
Australian Bank of Commerce (former), 2012

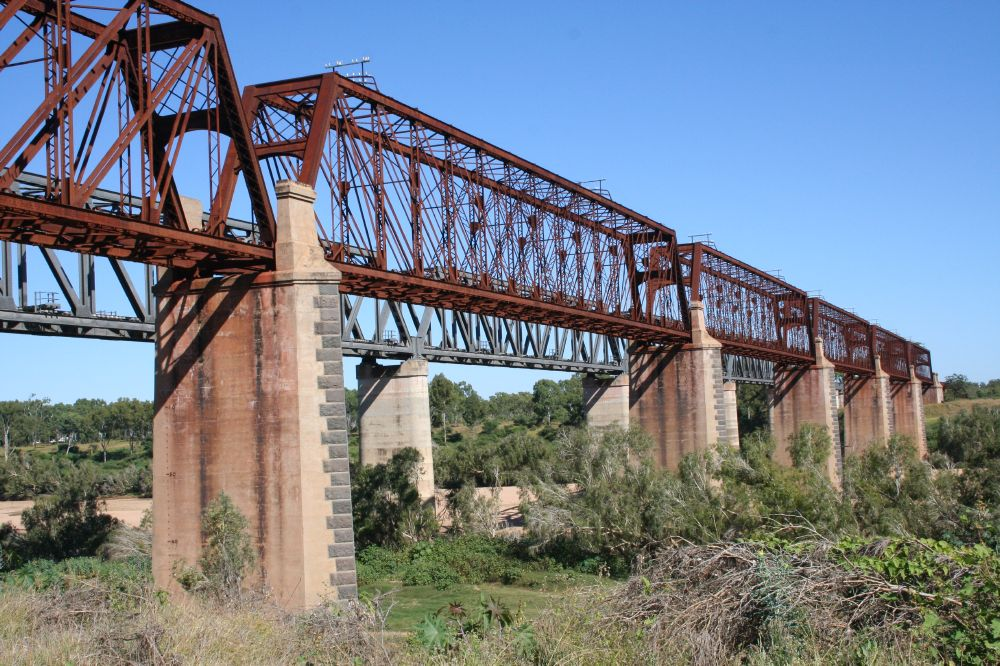
Old Burdekin rail bridge

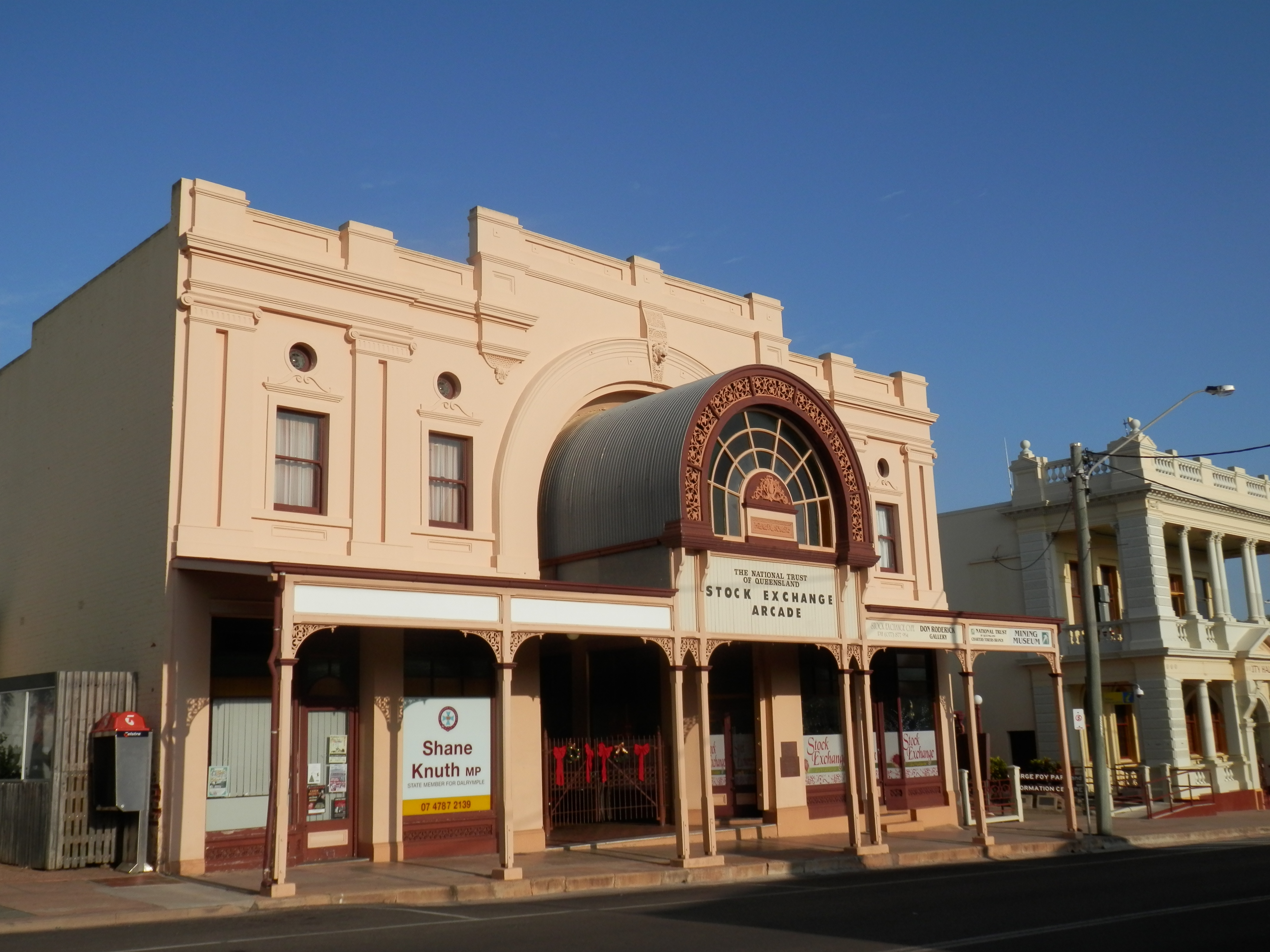
Stock Exchange Arcade

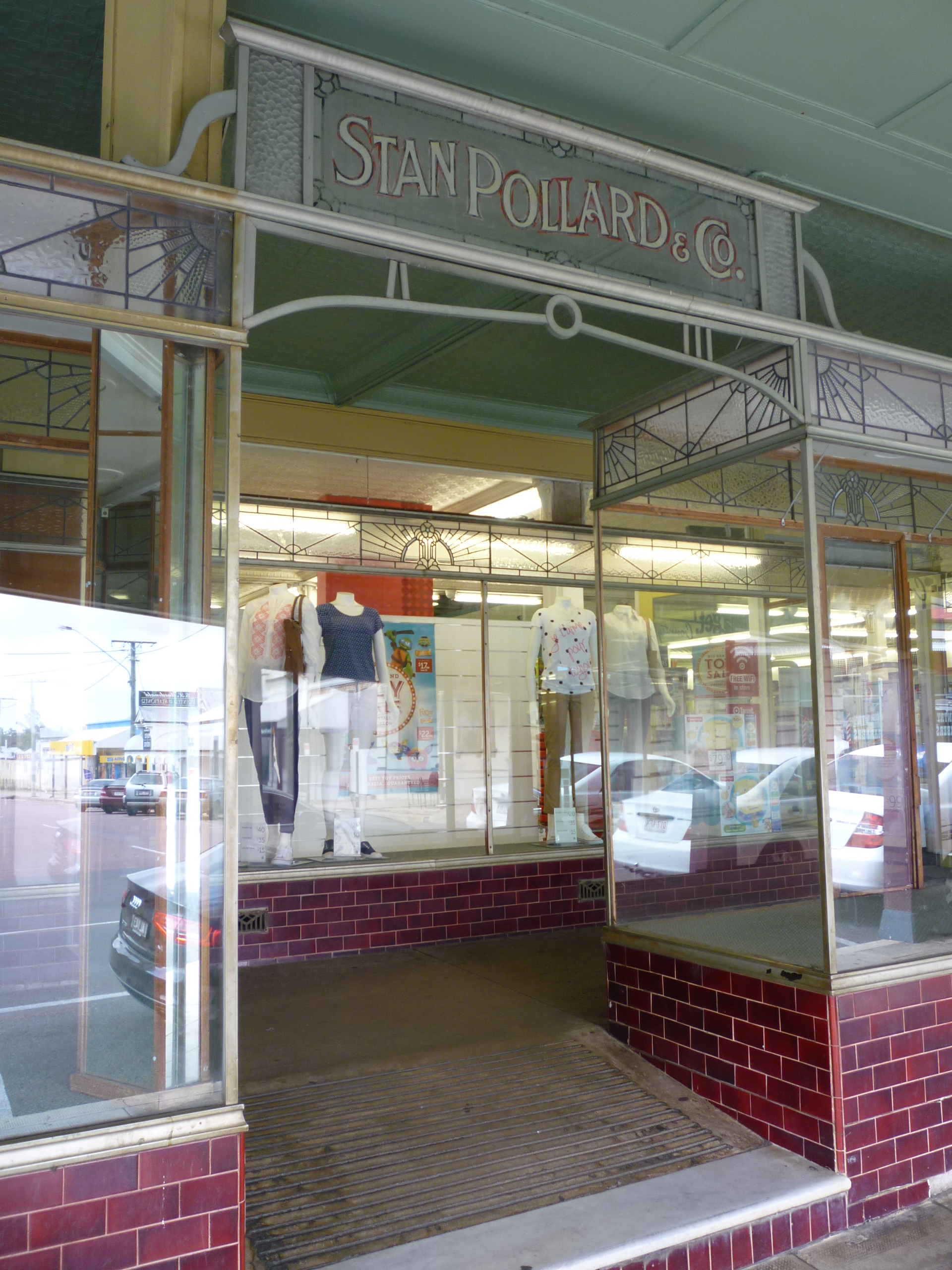
Exterior Target Country Charters Towers

Charters Towers has a number of heritage-listed sites, including:

- Church of Christ, Anne Street
- Boer War Veterans Memorial Kiosk and Lissner Park, Bridge Street
- Bore Sight Range and Compass Swinging Platform, Columbia, Toll
- Aldborough, 25 Deane Street
- Signals, Crane and Subway, Charters Towers Railway Station, Enterprise Road, Queenton
- Charters Towers Post Office, 17 Gill Street
- Pollard's Store (now K Hub), 18 Gill Street
- Bank of New South Wales, 34–36 Gill Street
- Charters Towers Police Station, 49 Gill Street
- St Columba's Church Bell Tower, 134 Gill Street
- Ambulance Building, 157 Gill Street
- Charters Towers Central State School, 39–47 High Street
- School of Mines, 24–26 Hodgkinson Street
- Charters Towers Courthouse, 28 Hodgkinson Street
- Ay Ot Lookout, 63 Hodgkinson Street
- Thornburgh House, 57–59 King Street, Richmond Hill
- Venus State Battery, MacDonald Street, Millchester
- Bartlam's Store (now Zara Clark Museum), Mosman Street
- ED Miles Mining Exchange, 65 Mosman Street
- Queensland National Bank, 72 Mosman Street (20.0757°S 146.2569°E)
- Charters Towers Stock Exchange Arcade, 76 Mosman Street
- Australian Bank of Commerce, 86 Mosman Street
- Lyall's Jewellery Shop, 90 Mosman Street
- Day Dawn mine remains, Paull Street
- Pfeiffer House, 2–6 Paull Street
- Charters Towers Masonic Lodge, 20 Ryan Street:
- Civic Club, 36 Ryan Street
- Mining works on Towers Hill, Towers Hill

Some of Charters Towers's heritage is spread across the town:

- Charters Towers mine shafts in Alabama, Millchester, Queenton, Towers Hill
- Stone kerbing, channels and footbridges of Charters Towers in Charters Towers City, Millchester, Queenton, Richmond Hill

== Population ==
According to the 2016 census, 8,120 people were residing in Charters Towers.

- Aboriginal and Torres Strait Islander people made up 10.9% of the population.
- About 83.3% of people were born in Australia. The next-most common countries of birth were New Zealand 1.5% and England 1.3%.
- About 87.6% of people spoke only English at home.
- The most common responses for religion were no religion 24.4%, Catholic 23.5%, and Anglican 18.0%.

== Economy ==
Charters Towers is a regional centre for the mining industry, the beef industry, and education, specifically boarding schools catering for remote rural families.

=== Mining ===
More gold has been estimated to exist underground than the total removed in the gold rush. Hundreds of separate mining leases covering an area of 200 square kilometres (77 sq mi) were consolidated by James Lynch in the 1970s and 1980s and the company Citigold listed on the Australian Securities Exchange in 1993. After 89 years, the goldfields were reopened, and gold was produced again from the Warrior Mine 4 km (2.5 mi) southeast of the town in November 2006 by Citigold Corporation Limited. Gold is mined from two deposits, which are accessed by sloping tunnels. The extracted gold ore is trucked about 10 km (6.2 mi) south-west of the city for processing into gold Doré bars. Citigold has announced plans to open three mines directly under the city to extract gold at a rate of 250,000 ounces per year.

=== Education ===
Charters Towers has four secondary schools: Columba Catholic College (opened in 1998); Blackheath and Thornburgh College (opened in 1919); All Souls St Gabriels School (opened in 1920); and Charters Towers State High School (opened in 1912). The nearest university is the James Cook University, in Townsville. Charters Towers is well known as a boarding school town, with families from western Queensland, the Northern Territory, Western Australia and the Torres Strait Islands sending their children to school in the district, over the larger cities in the area such as Townsville and Cairns. The Alliance of Charters Towers State Schools (ACTSS) represents the five State schools in the area that are funded by the Queensland Government – Charters Towers Central State School (opened in 1875), Millchester State School (opened in 1874), Richmond Hill State School (opened in 1895), Charters Towers School of Distance Education (opened in 1987) and Charters Towers State High School.

A number of other state schools within the city and nearby vicinity, which mostly commenced during the mining boom years, have also existed. These included Queenton State School (1890–1933), Mt. Leyshon State School (1890 – circa 1940), King's Gully State School (1911–1932), the Broughton State School (1905–?), Macrossan State School (1884–19??), Rishton State School (1884–1891), Liontown State School (1905 – circa 1921), Black Jack State School (1887–1948), Pumping Station State School (1898–1936), and Sellheim State School (1889–1939).

== Amenities ==
The Charters Towers Regional Council operates the Charters Towers Excelsior Library in Charters Towers at 130 Gill Street.

The Charters Towers branch of the Queensland Country Women's Association meets at the Jane Black Memorial Hall at 80 Mossman Street. Jane Black of Pajingo Station was a pioneer of the Charters Towers branch but also one of the founders of the Country Women's Association in Queensland as a whole. The hall was officially opened on Thursday 22 July 1954.

== Media and communications ==
=== Print ===
The Northern Miner newspaper (not to be confused with The Northern Miner, a mining publication in Canada) was first published in August 1872, just eight months after the discovery of gold. Such was its strength in those gold-mining days of the late 1880s that The Northern Miner installed a then-revolutionary linotype slug-casting machine before Brisbane's The Courier Mail. It was the only newspaper (of five published during the boom gold years) that survives today. In 2000, The Northern Miner was linked for the first time to the North Queensland Newspaper Company and therefore News Limited's electronic layout system and website.

The Evening Telegraph was a daily newspaper published between 1901 and 1921.

Sumpton's Gold Rush Gazette is a local newspaper which has been printed weekly since April 2021. The publication's founder, Daniel Sumpton, has been referred to as "The man who brought Print Journalism back to Charters Towers."

=== Online ===
The Charters Towers E-Village launched in 2011 and provides a location where people can connect with the Charters Towers community. The E-Village is the creation of local resident, Bryan West, following his frustration at not being able to find a suitable date for a kindergarten working bee. It includes a community calendar, member pages for all Charters Towers organisations, a database of services available within and to the community, classifieds, daily weather, and an online shop. It has a daily news service that originates and aggregates content from and relevant to the Charters Towers community, which is delivered through a Facebook page and free daily newsletter. Because it has a lower than national proportion of households with reliable internet access, the Charters Towers E-Village installed a free public wireless internet service in the main street of the town, in conjunction with local businesses. Since its inception in 2011, it has grown to receive about 1,500 visits each day. The E-village derives its income from related web services, with any profits being returned to the Charters Towers community.

=== Radio ===
Charters Towers is served by two local commercial radio stations, 4GC and West FM (originally branded as Hot FM), both owned by Resonate Broadcasting. Both stations rely heavily on networked programming but 4GC, broadcasting on 828 AM, produces a local breakfast program between 6am and 9am each weekday and provides local news bulletins and weather updates. Along with 3GG in Warragul, Victoria, Resonate Broadcasting bought the Charters Towers stations from Macquarie Media Group in 2008, with the three stations becoming the company's first investments.

The Bull FM88 is the only country music radio station in Charters Towers playing an extensive mix from the 1980s to today. It is a low-powered open narrowcast (LPON) service broadcasting on 88.0 FM, which began in 2018. It is owned and operated by Margflow Media.

=== Television ===
In 2021, Charters Towers was confirmed to have been selected as the location for the ninth season of Australian Survivor, a Survivor: Blood vs Water series scheduled to air on Network 10 in 2022.

== The Goldfield Ashes ==
The Charters Towers Goldfield Ashes has been an amateur cricket carnival conducted over the Australia Day long weekend in January since 1948 by the Charters Towers Cricket Association Incorporated (CTCA), and it is now the largest in the Southern Hemisphere. Players ranging from regional and the country to play. Numbers in recent years have reached just shy of 200 teams. The event is of massive benefit for the town, bringing in business for the entire region, especially the town's pubs and clubs. While the higher grades take it very seriously with awards and prizes given, the lower grades take to a more social view. Games involving drinking penalties and costume wearing are all part of the antics. In 2010, more teams were involved than ever. However, the competition did not reach the magic 200 teams only because of the lack of fields in the region. Many of the fields are concrete pitches on the properties of local families in the region.

== Notable people ==
For mayors of Charters Towers, see City of Charters Towers#Mayors.

- Margaret Theadora Allan (1889–1968), community worker
- Cecil Aynsley, member of the Queensland rugby league team of the century
- Bruce Barry (1934–2017), Australian actor and singer, grew up in the town
- Daisy Bates, Irish-Australian journalist and welfare worker, known for her work with indigenous Australians
- Adam Cook, Australian rugby league player
- Anderson Dawson, politician, 14th Premier of Queensland for one week, (1–7 December 1899), first Labor premier in Australia
- Dave Evans, first lead singer of AC/DC from 1973 to 1974
- William Edward Harney, Australian writer
- Wilhelm Iwan (1871–1958), author, historian, and theologian (lived in Charters Towers for nine years and wrote a book describing his experiences)
- Bob Katter, Australian politician
- Lieutenant Colonel Tom Mills MC & Bar (1908–1978), was born in Charters Towers
- Breaker Morant, Australian drover, horseman and soldier, spent some years in Charters Towers
- Hugh Mosman, pioneered gold mining in Charters Towers
- Jupiter Mosman, found the first gold in Charters Towers
- Major Hugh Quinn (1888–1915), Australian Soldier, namesake of Quinn's Post, frontline position ANZAC, Gallipoli
- Andrew Symonds, Australian Test cricketer, spent much of his early childhood in Charters Towers
- Edward Vivian Timms (1895–1960), novelist and scriptwriter
- Olwen Wooster (1917–1981) Australian air force officer and pioneering telecommunications engineer.

== See also ==
- Charters Towers Courthouse
- Charters Towers Excelsior Library
