= Charters Towers Excelsior Library =

Library in North Queensland, Australia

Coordinates: 20.0767°S 146.2613°E

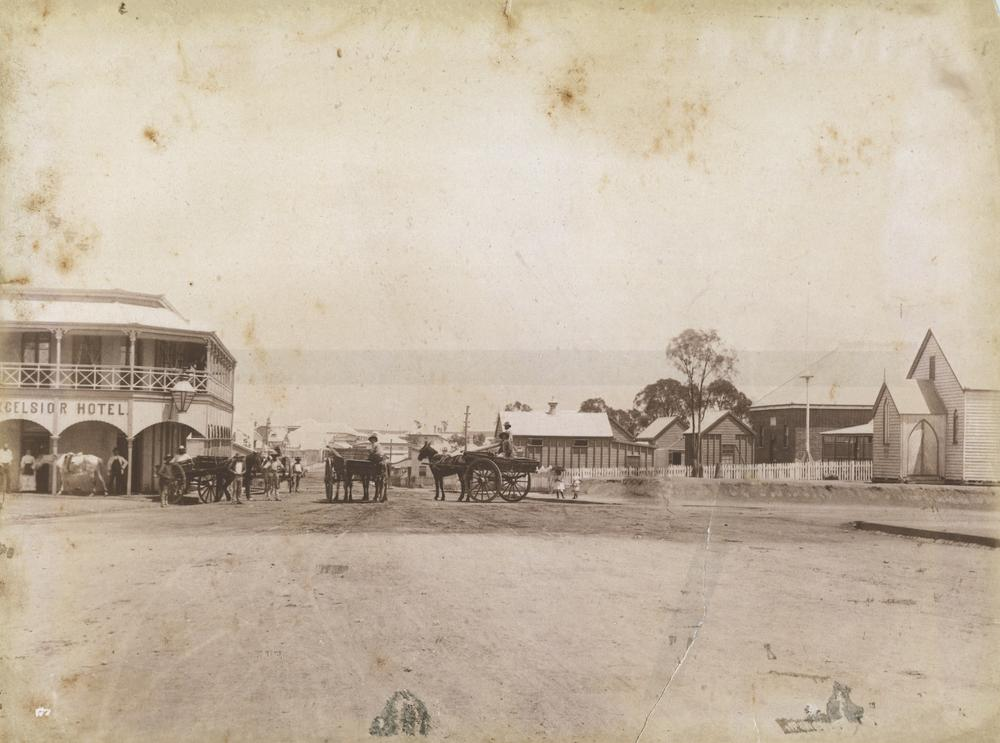
The Excelsior Hotel in 1888, left of picture

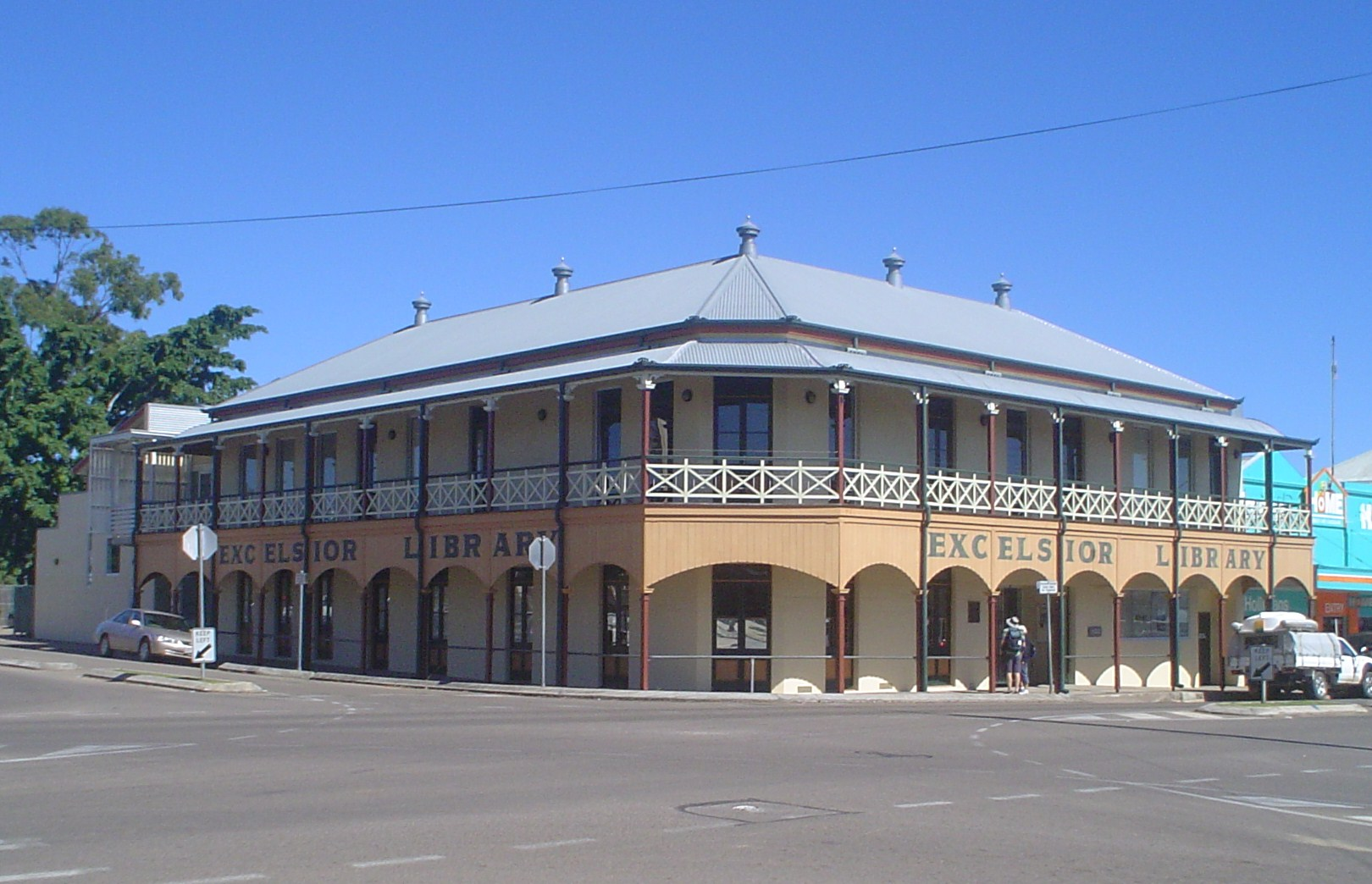
Excelsior Library 2012

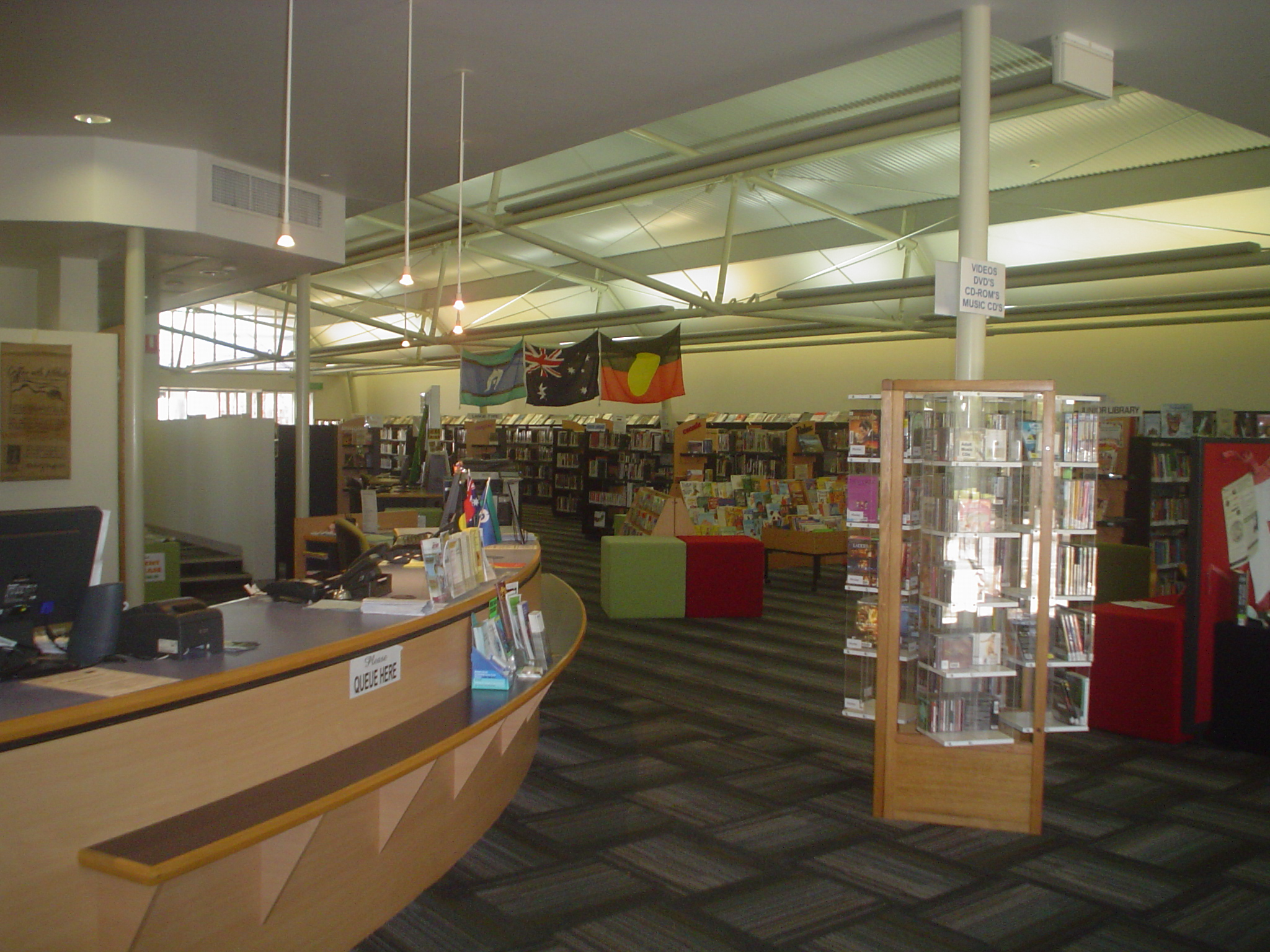
Inside the Charters Towers Excelsior Library, 2012

Charters Towers Excelsior Library is the local library at 130–132 Gill Street, Charters Towers City, Charters Towers in North Queensland, Australia. The building is a reconstruction of the original Excelsior Hotel which burned down in 1995. As well as the Charters Towers Regional library, the building houses the City of Charters Towers and Dalrymple Shire Archives.

The Excelsior Hotel was built in 1887 by William Gough and was located on the corner of Gill and Church Streets. It was a large two story building with a wide verandah around the first floor and a deep cellar beneath which was the same size as the bar above. William Gough sold the hotel in 1915 to Anthony Allis.

The hotel was almost destroyed by fire in March 1995, leaving only the outer shell of the brick building and a few of the interior brick walls. The site remained a ruin for a number of years until the Charters Towers City Council purchased it in April 2001. Work commenced on the conversion to a library in November 2002. The Excelsior Library was formally opened on 25 October 2003. The new building utilised the remaining walls and a number of features to retain the original characteristics of the hotel, including the first story verandah, restored batwing doors and a burnt doorframe set into a wall. The Library now houses the Charters Towers and Dalrymple Archives and a rehearsal and memorabilia room for the Excelsior Band. Two meeting rooms are also available for public hire. The ground floor room is named "The Florence Fitzgerald Room" after the leaseholder of the hotel from 1947 to 1987.

The library had a major refurbishment in 2016.
