= Enoggera Magazine Complex =

- Location within Queensland
- 27.4341°S 152.9779°E
- Location: Inwood Road, Gallipoli Barracks, Enoggera, Brisbane, Queensland, Australia

Commonwealth Heritage List
- Official name: Enoggera Magazine Complex
- Type: Listed place (Historic)
- Designated: 22 June 2004
- Reference no.: 105229

Enoggera Magazine Complex is a heritage-listed military installation at Inwood Road, Gallipoli Barracks, Enoggera, Brisbane, Queensland, Australia. It was added to the Australian Commonwealth Heritage List on 22 June 2004.

The Enoggera Magazine Complex is important for its long-term and continuous association with the Enoggera Army Camp (since 1911), presently known as Gallipoli Barracks. The magazine complex displays a strong ingenuity of design and construction adapted to the Queensland climate and safety requirements related to the storage of explosive materials. Furthermore, it may be the oldest surviving post-Federation military magazine complex in Australia.

== History ==
The Enoggera Army Camp, renamed Gallipoli Barracks in 1990, was synonymous with Army training in Queensland for many years. It was responsible for the training of thousands of Queenslanders for service in both World War I and World War II, and subsequent conflicts. The broader defence area at Enoggera has a considerable history of association with military activities, dating back to 1855. It is believed that British Imperial troops, based at Bulimba on the southern bank of the river, used the area for training exercises from as early as 1855. Rifle and training ranges, including the old Toowong Rifle Range, were established there and subsequently used by civilian groups such as the Queensland Rifle Association and the Queensland defence forces, including volunteer militia. Many Queensland troops sent to the Boer War in South Africa in the 1890s also trained here.

After Federation in 1901 the Australian Government became responsible for defence matters, although a fully coordinated national defence force did not arise for a number of years. Once Commonwealth military units began to be established in earnest, the government began to acquire property on a large-scale to facilitate training and accommodation of its forces. The land at Enoggera was acquired by the Commonwealth as part of this process in 1908. The acquisition amalgamated four separate properties: Thompson's Paddock, Rifle Paddock, Fraser's Paddock and Bell Paddock, comprising a total of 1235 acres. The first major improvement made by the Commonwealth was the development of a new rifle range, with mounds targets and shelter sheds.

The initial rifle range development at the site was followed by a prolonged period of initial development of the site, dating into the 1920s. The School of Musketry, Small Arms Magazine Store and to Cordite Magazines were erected in 1910 and 1911. These were followed by the explosives laboratory and the expense magazine in 1912. A cavalry remount section barracks was built in 1913, including a general barracks block, infirmary and farriery. Four more explosives magazines were built in 1913, and an additional magazine in 1915. The 1917–1920s period saw a number of hospital buildings and mobilisation stores also established.

In the years since this period the site has been constantly developed and expanded in line with the Army's changing requirements, although many of the earliest buildings have survived with their authenticity and integrity largely intact.

The site has a long association with a civilian organisation, the Queensland Rifle Association. The site was used by the Association in the 1850s and 1860s, but another site at Toowong was favoured by the club by the time the Commonwealth acquired the Enoggera properties. As soon as 1908 the rifle association had returned to Enoggera, seemingly sharing the facilities with the military for a number of years.

== Magazine complex ==
Enoggera Magazine Complex is a 10.20-hectare (25.2-acre) site, comprising the following buildings and their surrounding areas (to the distance shown):

- Building K12 (62m)
- Building K16 (60m)
- K18 (44m)
- Building K33 (14.6m)
- Building K37 (14.6m)

The Magazine Complex is a group of eight buildings which form a discrete complex on the eastern fringe of the army camp. The first two buildings, K16 and K18, were completed in 1911 at a cost of £2,756. They were designed primarily for the storage of cordite, an explosive substance used for 18-pounder and 15-pounder artillery shells. After the use of these shells was discontinued part way through World War II, the buildings were subsequently used as general-purpose ammunition and ordnance storehouses.

Building K12 is an explosives laboratory, which was constructed in 1912 at a cost of £718. The purpose of this building was for the examination and handling of explosive material.

Four additional stores, buildings K33, K34, K36 and K37 were added to the complex in 1914, costing just under £3540. A final building, K35, was added to this second batch in 1915, costing £940. These magazines were designed primarily to house 18-pounder and 15-pounder artillery ammunition, hence their proximity to the cordite stores and the laboratory. As with K16 and K18, their original purpose was superseded in World War II, and as a result they were used for storage of small arms ammunition and other ordnance.

Another building, K19, is located in proximity to the magazine complex. While it appears of similar age and design to the magazine buildings it is considerably smaller and there is little available information as to its history or function. It is not included in heritage listing.

The Enoggera Magazine Complex has been relatively unhindered or compromised in terms of its historical integrity by the forces of change and development. Because of their original and ongoing function of storing explosive material, the complex has been left in a relatively isolated part of the military area due to safety requirements.

All of these buildings are believed to have been designed by Thomas Pye, then Deputy Government Architect of the Queensland Public Works Department, under the supervision of A. B. Brady. From the early 1890s until the end of World War I the Queensland Government Architect's office was prolific in its output of new public buildings for both the Queensland and Commonwealth Governments. In the early post-Federation years the Queensland Public Works Department often constructed new buildings on behalf of the Commonwealth, which had insufficient resources to undertake many new projects. The time during which Brady was Government Architect coincided with an almost golden age of public construction in Queensland. A talented team of architects was on hand at various times during this time, including Brady, Pye and John Smith Murdoch. During his tenure as Chief Architect, Southern Division and then Deputy Government Architect, Pye designed or supervised plans for a number of Queensland's more prominent public buildings of the Federation period, including the Rockhampton Customs House, the Stanthorpe Post Office, the Woolloongabba Post Office, and the Naval Offices in Brisbane.

Explosives storage magazines and buildings are not uncommon as heritage buildings in Australia in general terms, but this particular complex is rare in a number of ways. A large number of surviving powder magazines to be found in the Register of the National Estate or state/territory heritage lists date from the pre-1900 period, but the majority of these are non-military, predominantly associated with the mining industry. There are several exceptions to this, however, one of the more notable of which is the 1878 Jack's Magazine in Footscray, Victoria.

It is possible that the Enoggera magazine complex was the first, and remains the only surviving, explosives magazine complex constructed by the Commonwealth (or by the State under Commonwealth direction) in the period between Federation and World War Two. In addition, buildings K16 and K18 are probably the oldest surviving military buildings in Australia purpose built for the storage of cordite.

Cordite was not extensively adopted for military use in Australia until just before Federation, black gunpowder being used in the preceding period. The magazine buildings at Irwin Barracks in Karrakatta, Western Australia, were constructed by the Western Australian Government in 1898 with the purpose of handing them over to the Commonwealth at Federation, but were purpose built for storage of antiquated black powder and fuses, not cordite. The two cordite magazines at Enoggera were in fact constructed prior to the Commonwealth's first cordite-processing explosives factory, at Maribyrnong in Melbourne. It could be inferred from this that the Enoggera magazines were part of a complex strategy by the Commonwealth to develop an extensive explosives manufacturing and storage capacity.

A majority of the heritage buildings surviving in Australia associated with either the manufacture of explosives, particularly cordite, and the military storage of such, relate strongly to World War II. These include the Frances Bay and Snake Creek magazines in the Northern Territory, and the Smithfield Magazine Area in South Australia. Explosives manufacturing sites included the explosives factories at Salisbury, South Australia, and Leightonfield (now Villawood Immigration Depot), New South Wales and Albion in Victoria.

It is likely that the Enoggera Magazine Complex is the oldest Commonwealth explosives storage facility in Australia remaining in Commonwealth hands, having serviced Australian military needs for both World Wars and major conflicts since. It is probably the oldest magazine in Australia designed for military storage of cordite and cordite based explosives. Its continuous use as a munitions storage facility since 1911 is made more significant by its status as one of the oldest sets of buildings in the Enoggera military area, which was one of the Commonwealth's first major purpose built Army bases, established in 1908.

== Description ==
The Enoggera magazine complex is set in an isolated part of the Gallipoli Barracks area, reflecting safety requirements in the event of accidental ignition of explosive materials. Development of the area, especially build-up of military facilities associated with various conflicts, has been virtually non-existent. The complex is designed and ideally suited for its immediate environment, making strong use of natural slopes and ridges to minimize explosion risks. A single road, Inwood Road, runs directly through the centre of the group and a high-security fence guards the perimeter of the area. Inwood Road is flanked by a row of pine trees at the point where it transverses the magazine complex. A series of concrete stormwater drains is networked across the area. There is also some landscape evidence of a trolley system running between magazine buildings and the laboratory, from the earlier periods of the site. The views from the site, especially the sense of isolation, are significant in interpreting the past function of the site, although these are slightly impacted now by the recent construction of a military medical facility to the west of the site, although this is minimised by tree growth.

Although designed and built over a number of consecutive years, the buildings in the complex display a strong similarity in appearance and design, probably due to their shared purpose. Nonetheless, three distinct group types can be discerned within the complex, which also reflect the batches in which they were built. These groups are defined as buildings K16 and K18, building K12, and buildings K33–37.

The Cordite magazinesare located near the crest of a low ridge on the western side of the complex. They face southwest, are set into the slope of the ridge and are situated at distance of 44 metres apart, to prevent an explosion in one magazine igniting the other. The two cordite magazines are structurally almost identical, constructed using cavity brick walls and provided with a double roof to facilitate natural ventilation and insulation. Each building is surrounded by an insulation corridor and verandah surrounded on three sides by a concrete berm set into the side of the slope.

Internally, the floors are float-finished concrete slabs coated with a gritless asphalt surface, which was apparently designed to reduce the chance of sparks emanating from hobnail boots. The double ceilings feature an internal insulator of tongue and groove boards lined with asbestos sheeting supported by a frame of timber trusses. Above this, each building has its corrugated iron roof frame, also lined with tongue and groove timber, supported by the building's walls. A semi-circular, corrugated iron ventilator extends the length of the half-hipped roof. The gable ends are enclosed with zinc louvres externally and wire netting internally. The double roof and ventilation system provides an essential response to Brisbane's sub-tropical climate, providing a well-designed natural cooling and ventilation system. Further safety precautions are evidence in the lightning rods installed at each end of the ventilator along with earth straps.

The Laboratory (K12) is set on its own, opposite the ammunition magazines (K33–37). It is set approximately 60 metres from the closest cordite store, building K16, and about 35 metres from the closest ammunition store, K35. The building is slightly cut into gently sloping ground and although it is considerably smaller, it strongly reflects the style, composition and design of the earlier and later magazine buildings. It features red brick cavity walls and a ventilated corrugated iron roof in line with buildings K16 and K18. It also has a suspended asbestos-cement ceiling. Cavity brick walls separate the internal spaces and the floor, which extends onto the verandah area, is float-finished concrete. The building is surrounded by a verandah extending in an unbroken pitch from the hipped roof. The interior is subdivided into three compartments by cavity red brick walls; a series of low arches at intervals along the walls denote receiving hatches for each room. Above the top lights along the transom a stencilled sign saying LABORATORY designates the function of the building. One of the key features of this building is the cartridge filling room, provided with weighing and work benches along one the walls. The opposite wall is equipped with a door and two receiving hatches.

The ammunition magazines (K33–37), constructed in 1913 and 1914, are spaced at intervals of 14.6m apart, sited and stepping up along a ridge to the south of the laboratory. The design utilises the natural slope, with the magazines set into its side, in much the same way as K16 and K 18. The front of each building is exposed fully at natural ground level, while the sides are built into the earthen bank. Additional fill has been added to increase the natural ground level so that it is horizontally aligned with the tops of the magazine walls. Concrete retaining walls enclose three sides of each building.

Each building is cavity brick in construction with a gabled roof, surrounded by a deep verandah. Roof ventilation and lightning rods are a feature in much the same way as for K16 and K18. Similar too are the internal double-roof insulation system and the grit-free asphalt float floor. Each building is divided into three compartments, each of which could originally accommodate 1,000 rounds of ammunition. A door on the external long wall opens in the centre of each building, flanked by windows with steel shutters.

== Condition ==
All the buildings are in good condition and have been little modified.

== Heritage listing ==
The Enoggera Magazine Complex, constructed between 1911 and 1915, is significant for its service as an explosives and munitions storage area for the Commonwealth defence forces, through two World Wars and numerous other conflicts until the present.

Enoggera Magazine Complex was listed on the Australian Commonwealth Heritage List on 22 June 2004 having satisfied the following criteria.

Criterion A: Processes

The Enoggera Magazine Complex, constructed between 1911 and 1915, is significant for its service as an explosives and munitions storage area for the Commonwealth defence forces, through two World Wars and numerous other conflicts until the present. It is an integral component of the history of the Gallipoli Barracks, formerly Enoggera Army Base, which was Queensland's major military training base for much of the twentieth century. The magazine complex, including the landscape, the cordite stores, the munitions stores (K33–37) and the explosives laboratory (K12), forms a complete and highly intact example of explosives storage methods from 1911.

The magazine complex is a good example of Pye's work and an important historic example of military construction undertaken by the State at the behest of the Commonwealth in the early post-Federation period.

Criterion B: Rarity

The complex is possibly the oldest continuously used explosives storage area to have been constructed for the unified Commonwealth defence forces after Federation, reflecting the development of a Commonwealth munitions production capability in the years before World War One. K16 and K18 are probably also the oldest surviving, purpose-built, military cordite storage facilities in Australia.

The integrity and authenticity of these designs is enhanced by the continuity of function and lack of active development of the buildings or their setting since 1911.

Criterion D: Characteristic values

The Enoggera Magazine Complex displays clear design elements relative to its function of storing highly dangerous explosives. The location of the complex in an isolated pocket of the army base, the building of the magazines into the side of existing ridges and rises, and the safety distances between structures are a key feature of the landscape design.

Criterion F: Technical achievement

The buildings themselves illustrate specific solutions to the functional and safety requirements of the site, including surrounding reinforced concrete berms, cavity brick construction, gritless asphalt floors, as well as a astute ventilation design, featuring wrap-around verandas, double roofing and ventilators along the length of the roofs.

Criterion H: Significant people

The complex is strongly associated with the architectural career of Thomas Pye. Pye effected the designs whilst Deputy Government Architect with the Queensland Public Works Department. Along with AB Brady and JS Murdoch, Pye was part of a prolific period of public works in Queensland between 1890 and 1920, to designs by the Queensland Government Architect's office on behalf of the State and the new Commonwealth.
