= Remount Complex, Enoggera =

Remount Complex
- Location within Queensland
- 27.4296°S 152.9831°E
- Location: Wynter Road, Gallipoli Barracks, Enoggera, Queensland, Australia

Commonwealth Heritage List
- Official name: Remount Complex (former)
- Type: Listed place (Historic)
- Designated: 22 June 2004
- Reference no.: 105638

Remount Complex is a heritage-listed former military installation at Wynter Road, Gallipoli Barracks, Enoggera, Queensland, Australia. The former Remount Complex is an important group of early twentieth century Australian Government defence buildings at the former Enoggera Army Camp, now known as Gallipoli Barracks. A group of five buildings, the Remount Section is a significant link to a famous, almost legendary, tradition of the Australian military: mounted units such as the Light Horse. It was added to the Australian Commonwealth Heritage List on 22 June 2004.

== History ==
=== Enoggera army camp ===
The Enoggera Army Camp, renamed Gallipoli Barracks in 1990, was synonymous with Army training in Queensland for many years. It was responsible for the training of thousands of Queenslanders for service in both World War I and World War II, and subsequent conflicts. The broader defence area at Enoggera has a considerable history of association with military activities, dating back to 1855. It is believed that British Imperial troops, based at Bulimba on the southern bank of the river, used the area for training exercises from as early as 1855. Rifle and training ranges, including the old Toowong Rifle Range, were established there and subsequently used by civilian groups such as the Queensland Rifle Association and the Queensland defence forces, including volunteer militia. Many Queensland troops sent to the Boer War in South Africa in the 1890s also trained here.

After Federation in 1901 the Australian Government became responsible for defence matters, although a fully coordinated national defence force did not arise for a number of years. Once Commonwealth military units began to be established in earnest, the government began to acquire property on a large-scale to facilitate training and accommodation of its forces. The land at Enoggera was acquired by the Commonwealth as part of this process in 1908. The acquisition amalgamated four separate properties: Thompson's Paddock, Rifle Paddock, Fraser's Paddock and Bell Paddock, comprising a total of 1235 acres. The first major improvement made by the Commonwealth was the development of a new rifle range, with mounds targets and shelter sheds.

The initial rifle range development at the site was followed by a prolonged period of initial development of the site, dating into the 1920s. The School of Musketry, Small Arms Magazine Store and two Cordite Magazines were erected in 1910 as part of a functional complex associated with the rifle range. These were followed by the explosives laboratory and the expense magazine in 1912. The cavalry remount section was built in 1913. Four more explosives magazines were built in 1913, and an additional magazine in 1915. The 1917–1920s period saw a number of hospital buildings and mobilisation stores also established.

Nearly all of these 1910–1913 buildings are believed to have been designed by Thomas Pye, then Deputy Government Architect of the Queensland Public Works Department, under the supervision of A. B. Brady. From the early 1890s until the end of World War I the Queensland Government Architect's office was prolific in its output of new public buildings for both the Queensland and Commonwealth Governments. In the early post-Federation years the Queensland Public Works Department often constructed new buildings on behalf of the Commonwealth, which had insufficient resources to undertake many new projects. The time during which Brady was Government Architect coincided with an almost golden age of public construction in Queensland. A talented team of architects was on hand at various stages during this time, including Brady, Pye and John Smith Murdoch. During his tenure as Chief Architect, Southern Division, and then Deputy Government Architect, Pye designed or supervised plans for a number of Queensland's more prominent public buildings of the Federation period, including the Rockhampton Customs House, the Stanthorpe Post Office, the Woolloongabba Post Office and the Naval Offices in Brisbane.

Since World War I, the Enoggera site has been constantly developed and expanded in line with the Army's changing requirements, although many of the earliest buildings have survived with their authenticity and integrity largely intact.

The Gallipoli Barracks site has had a long association with a civilian organisation, the Queensland Rifle Association. The site was used by the Association in the 1850s and 1860s, but another site at Toowong was favoured by the club by the time the Commonwealth acquired the Enoggera properties. As soon as 1908 the rifle association had returned to Enoggera, seemingly sharing the facilities with the military for a number of years.

=== Enoggera and horses in the Australian military ===
Australia's rugged terrain and open spaces, and early pastoral industries were all key factors in the development of horsemanship, and the concept of the "drover" and the "bushman" in the early colonial periods. By natural extension, and because of the skill many Australians developed in horsemanship, mounted military units figured prominently in the colonies' plans to defend themselves and the Empire. Defended primarily by Imperial troops and ships in the first seventy years or so of European settlement, by the 1860s most Australian colonies had begun to develop fledgling navies and volunteer militia, in the context of perceived vulnerability to an invasion or annexation from Russia or other antagonistic world powers. By the 1880s, increased coordination and cooperation between the colonies led to a more focused effort in Australia to prepare for the continent's defence. One effect of this was the development, in each colony, of professional militia, to be supplemented by volunteers in times of emergency. From these earliest periods of home-grown defence, the horse has been a significant figure in Australia's military identity, borne on the reputation of the Australian bushman.

Queensland's first colonial militia were raised in 1859, the year of its separation from New South Wales as an independent colony. Among those first units were the Mounted Rifles and the Mounted Infantry. From 1866 to 1885, however, as more formal military units were developed by the Queensland government, there were no equestrian forces. In the 1890s new mounted battalions were formed and in 1897 these were combined to form the Queensland Mounted Infantry.

At the outbreak of the Boer War, Queensland was the first of the Australian colonies to offer troops, the first contingent of which left for South Africa in November 1899. This first group was entirely mounted, featuring 124 officers, 2041 troops and 2471 horses. Many of these troops would have trained at the Enoggera training ground and rifle range. Queensland units later fought in South Africa under the banner of the Commonwealth, following Federation in 1901. The first Commonwealth-raised units did not set sail until 1902, as the war reached its final stages.

By 1903 the Queensland Mounted Infantry was restructured into the Commonwealth Light Horse, but remained stationed in Queensland. By 1913 the Commonwealth had established a remount complex at Enoggera to service the Queensland contingent of the Light Horse, similar to remount areas built simultaneously in other states, such as Maribyrnong (Victoria), Glenthorne (South Australia) and Holsworthy, New South Wales. By 1914, the eve of Australia's involvement in World War I, the Light Horse had 23 regiments.

Two of the units based at Enoggera, the 3rd Infantry Battalion AIF and the 2nd Light Horse, were among the first Australian troops called up for overseas service late in 1914. By this time, volunteers were pouring into Enoggera to enlist. Many of those who enlisted in the Light Horse brought their own horses, which were purchased by the Commonwealth, while others were issued with Commonwealth mounts, Walers, generally trained and broken at the remount depot. On 16 September 1914 the Light Horse recruits and regulars were formally inspected by the Governor General, Sir Ronald Ferguson and, four days later, over 2000 troops of the first expeditionary force marched through Brisbane. On 22 September, they embarked at Pinkenba Wharf, for overseas service.

During the course of the war, Australian mounted units impressed allies and foes alike, and it became apparent that the Waler horses, so named for their New South Wales breeding, had developed a reputation as the world's finest cavalry horse. Over 160,000 Australian horses were shipped overseas with their units during the war.

The 2nd Light Horse arrived in Cairo, Egypt, in January 1915 and took part in the ill-fated invasion of the Gallipoli Peninsula in Turkey in late April of that year. The Light Horse served at Gallipoli in a dismounted role, the terrain at Anzac/Ari Burnu being poorly suited to cavalry manoeuvres. At Gallipoli, the 2nd Light Horse were charged with the defence of Quinn's Post in Monash Valley, vulnerable to Turkish positions which looked directly over it. They were amongst the units required to hold the post under the brunt of a major Turkish counteroffensive on 19 May. On 7 August, as part of the now famous Allied "August Offensive", men of the 2nd Light Horse led a feint attack from Quinn's Post, charging the Turkish line and suffering heavy casualties, to coincide with the tragic charge of the 3rd and 1st Light Horse at The Nek.

Following Gallipoli, the Light Horse participated more in cavalry style campaigns, primarily against the Ottoman Empire in Syria and Palestine. Several key battles in 1917 produced some of the Australian military's finest moments. A significant Allied victory was achieved in Gaza, Palestine, on 27 October 1917, when the 4th Australian Light Horse charged the Turkish trenches at Beersheba, causing a rout. Similar manoeuvres were effected weeks later in the capture of Jerusalem. Beersheba has been claimed as the last great cavalry charge in history (although this honour probably belongs to an Italian cavalry unit in Abyssinia during World War II), while some British commanders hailed it as the greatest cavalry operation in the history of the British Empire.

While such exploits did much to build the mystique and honour of the Light Horse, technological change ultimately limited its future. After World War I the AIF was disbanded and replaced with the Citizens Military forces, presumably in anticipation of long-term world peace. These peace time forces included two cavalry divisions and three Light Horse regiments. The Remount Complex at Enoggera continued to be used for breaking horses and training troops in riding and mounted warfare.

At the outbreak of World War II, Enoggera was once again used as a training camp for soldiers bound for overseas service. By this time, however, horses had been largely replaced by machines such as light tanks and armoured vehicles. Horses were used in battle for the last time in Syria in 1941, but, by this time, the Light Horse had largely been given over to armoured units. After the war, the Commonwealth's remount depots, including that at Enoggera, were closed.

=== Comparative information ===
The Enoggera Remount Depot, built in 1913, was just one of a number of remount complexes established by the Commonwealth around Australia, from 1913 until just after World War I. Other depots were also established, with the major ones at Victoria Barracks (New South Wales), Mowbray (Tasmania), Guildford (Western Australia), Holsworthy (New South Wales), Keswick (South Australia), and Glenthorne (South Australia). Of these, there are very few intact or extant buildings and structures remaining. The Holsworthy depot probably survives as subsurface archaeological remains only, while only part of the 1917 stables building at Victoria Barracks (Sydney) has survived. At Glenthorne, in South Australia, the remount depot was converted from an old homestead, and few purpose-built remnants of the depot have survived. The remount complex at Maribyrnong was situated on a rise known as "remount hill." This depot, established in 1913, incorporated the former racing stables of trainers CB and H Fisher, which is the only surviving element of this complex today. The Maribyrnong site also contains the grave of "Sandy", the mount of Major-General W.T. Bridges, an officer who died at Gallipoli in May 1915, reputedly the only military horse to return home to Australia after World War I.

There is good evidence to suggest, therefore, that the former Enoggera Remount Complex is not only the most intact surviving Commonwealth remount depot, but that it is the only fully intact example of such a complex. Although there have been modifications to its buildings, the complex, which is no longer used for its original purpose, all of the buildings remain in situ and intact, with substantial original fabric. Furthermore, they also still fully demonstrate the appearance and function of a Commonwealth remount depot, and its related military function that was once essential to what a crucial element of Australia's military forces, the Mounted Infantry and the Light Horse.

== Description ==
Remount Complex is at about 1ha, Wynter Road, Enoggera, comprising an area bounded by a line commencing at the intersection of the eastern side of Wynter Road and the alignment of the southern wall of Building E68, then easterly via that alignment to its intersection with the boundary fence line, then northerly via the boundary fence line to its intersection with the alignment of the northern wall of Building E79, then westerly via that alignment to its intersection with the western side of Wynter Street, then northerly via the western side of Wynter Street to Brand Road, then westerly via the southern side of Brand Road to Lavarack Parade, then southerly via the eastern side of Lavarack Parade to its intersection with the alignment of the southern wall of Building E67, then easterly via that alignment to its intersection with the eastern side of Wynter Road, then southerly to the point of commencement. Included are Buildings E67, E68, E69, E70, E71, E78, E79, E80, E82, and the landscaped garden zone.

=== Enoggera remount section ===
The Remount Section was established in 1913 to train and care for the horses of Commonwealth military units. The complex consists of five main buildings: the Barracks Block (E67), Fodder Store (E68), Carpenter's Store and Saddlery (E69), Farriery (E70) and Infirmary Building (E71).

The Barracks Block (E67) was built as accommodation for men in two dormitories, each 36 feet by 22 feet (10.97 x 6.7 metres). Beds or bunks were not provided, instead each man slept on a palliasse with ground sheet on the floor. There were separate Sergeant's room, lavatories, laundry and storerooms, and a large mess room and kitchen to the rear. During World War II the Barracks Block was converted to the quarters of the Officer in Charge and headquarters of the Remount Depot. The dormitories and Sergeant's room were divided down the centre and transformed into two married quarters, while the mess area was converted to an office and headquarters. The kitchen became the men's recreation and lunch room. In 1952 the old dormitory wing was converted again, into an officers' lounge and billiards room, with other minor internal modifications. The building is still in use as an officers' mess. Externally, there is minimal change to its original appearance.

The building consists of three independent sections, set up on stumps, joined by covered walkways. The front section consists of the former barracks block, a highset timber building with entry via a timber staircase and an enclosed central timber verandah. From this entry, two large (former) accommodation wings either side define the symmetry of the building. The enclosed entry verandah features timber sash windows, probably original, but all others are aluminium sliding windows. The building is clad in a cream timber weatherboard, with a white corrugated iron roof, which is gabled to the front entry verandah (with a white horizontal timber-strip infill) and half-gabled to the side elevations, with red gutters and trims. Internally, spaces have been extensively remodelled over time to accommodate changing purposes, although some original wall, door, ceiling and floor fabric survives in situ.

The other two sections of the building, the mess room and the kitchen, are similar in composition, but considerably smaller than the front building. The three structures are connected, in sequence, via covered timber walkways, flanked by recently added timber decking. The entire site is highlighted by a formal garden space to the front, featuring concrete pathways and large palm trees. The rear garden is less formal, but features one Moreton Bay Fig of considerable size. Opposite the front entrance, bounded by the junction of Lavarack Parade and Wynter Road, is a large landscaped garden zone, part of the recreational spaces of the original Remount Depot Barracks Block.

The Fodder Store (E68) was a simple timber building, designed for the storage of fodder and other supplies. Some minor alterations and additions have been made more recently, including the enclosing of the verandahs and a 1950s timber extension to the rear. It is a simple, rectangular building with white corrugated iron walls and a red corrugated iron hipped roof. The foundations are a combination of original timber and later concrete stumps, the former having been affected by termite activity in places. While a great deal of original building fabric remains, including floors, cladding, roofing and some windows and doors, it is in relatively poor condition.

The Carpenter's Store and Saddlery (E69) was constructed after the other buildings in the complex, being added during World War I, primarily for the purpose of storing and repairing saddles. It is currently used as a general-purpose storage shed. It is a small, rectangular building, clad in cream weatherboard with a gabled, red corrugated iron roof. On the eastern (side) elevation, there are four large square corrugated iron doors, a later addition, which open outwards. Many original fabric elements remain, including the roofing, cladding, casement windows, trims and concrete floor. A small timber extension was added to the north elevation of this building in the 1950s.

The Farriery (E70) originally consisted of a shoeing shed and blacksmith's area and lean-to, featuring an open forge with ash floor and a red brick chimney. The Farriery has undergone several minor modifications since 1913, including the addition of some doors and windows, while the forge and brick chimney have been removed. The building, which lies to the north of the Saddlery, is presently used as a storeroom. It is a simple, rectangular, cream weatherboard clad building with a hipped, corrugated iron roof. Three large, square timber doors are present on the eastern elevation. The timber cladding and the majority of the roofing are original, as are a large proportion of the windows and internal lining and trims.

The Infirmary Building (E71) was built for the care and treatment of sick horses. It originally contained stable accommodation for ten horses, with each horse contained in 13 by 13 foot (3.96 by 3.96 metre) stalls. The floor was constructed of wood block pavers, which sloped to the middle of the building, connecting to a drainage system and absorbing pits. The Infirmary also contained two fodder stores, harness room and pharmacy, each of which had a concrete floor. The Infirmary was partly destroyed by fire in 1925, but rebuilt to match the existing fabric. The original feed boxes were removed in 1961 when the building was converted for use as a RAEME depot attached to the 3RAR. The original wood block floors were replaced with concrete at this time.

The former Infirmary is clad in cream weatherboard, with a gabled, red corrugated iron roof. Most of the external cladding and roofing is original, although significant modifications have been made to the internal make-up of the building, to accommodate changing functions, which has had some impact on the internal and external fabric. The original plans show the Infirmary building designed in a vee shape, with each length of the building branching off at a ninety-degree angle, one east–west and the other north–south. Each length contained five individual stable cubicles, each with its own door, serviced by fodder stores at the end of each row of stalls. The pharmacy was a slightly larger room, located at the southern end of the building. The plans also show a planned extension, which was a mirror image of the existing building, built to the southern end of the site, although this was never built. The original stable doors have been filled in, with windows inserted, and most of the partitions between the former stable cubicles have been removed, except for three converted single rooms at the southern end. New doorways, windows and internal partitions have been added in various places, although much of the internal tongue and groove lining, windows and doors still remain. One feature of particular interest in this building is the ventilation design. In addition to the large number of roof ventilators, there is also a system of wall ventilation, which provides overlapping gaps between the first four weatherboards below the roofline to allow circulation of air. This would have alleviated humidity and heat for horses required to be kept quarantined indoors due to illness.

The former Remount Complex at Enoggera features two distinct precincts, separated by Wynter Road, which runs through the complex on a north–south axis. The first of these is the accommodation precinct, featuring the former barracks and landscaped garden. The second is a discrete complex of functional buildings, the Fodder Store, Saddlery, Farriery and Infirmary. Within this precinct, the buildings form a large, rectangular yard area, onto which each building faces. While this is presently covered in asphalt, the original area was probably grassed, and used for saddling and marshalling horses. Two more recent unrelated buildings (E80 and E82) built on the site of the proposed extension to E71, intrude on this area somewhat.

Gallipoli Barracks, in general, has been planned and constructed as a series of open areas, with minimal fencing only around secure compounds.

In the early periods of its existence the remount section was situated along the eastern boundary of the military range site. Immediately west of and with a direct relationship to this complex, were the horse paddocks, where training and instruction in horsemanship and cavalry tactics was conducted. During and following World War II, however, as the value of military horsemanship declined and other needs gained precedence, the area was subsumed, with a series of new buildings occupying these spaces.

=== Condition ===
The area has not been used as a remount complex since World War II. Most of the buildings are now used for storage or office space, and have been modified accordingly. Much original fabric is still evident. The former Barracks Building was converted into an officers' mess in the 1950s, and still retains that function today. While the building has undergone several internal modifications, original fabric is still present and the original layout can be discerned from this. The complex is essentially in very good condition.

== Heritage listing ==
The complex is probably the most intact former Commonwealth remount depot in Australia, featuring infirmary and stables, saddlery, farriery, fodder store, and barracks, and as such may be the only site where a full appreciation of the role and function of remount depots in Australian defence history can be achieved.

The buildings of the former remount depot at Enoggera are pragmatic, stylish but modest in detail, with custom-designed adaptations to Brisbane's subtropical climate, such as the ventilated weatherboards on the stable cubicles of the Infirmary Building.

Remount Complex was listed on the Australian Commonwealth Heritage List on 22 June 2004 having satisfied the following criteria.

Criterion A: Processes

The former Remount Complex at Gallipoli Barracks, Enoggera, built in 1913 by the Queensland Public Works Department on behalf of the Commonwealth, is of considerable historical significance. It comprises five buildings and landscape elements particular to the function of a military remount depot, designed for the training and treatment of horses, used so effectively by Australian forces in World War I.

The former Remount Complex buildings are an integral component of a suite of pre-World War I Commonwealth buildings at Enoggera, including the Small Arms Magazine, former School of Musketry and former Small Arms Magazine. Each of these buildings reflects a significant phase in the construction of government infrastructure in Australia, where Commonwealth buildings were often designed and built by state public works departments on behalf of the Commonwealth.

Criterion B: Rarity

While some modifications have been made, the buildings remain in their original locations with their original interrelationships intact; these early twentieth century functions and design can still be seen clearly in their form, fabric and appearance. The buildings form a discrete complex, which was once enhanced by an adjacent horse paddock, now subsumed by more recent buildings.

Criterion H: Significant people

The former Remount Complex is associated with Australia's legendary mounted soldiers, especially the Light Horse, whose exploits at Gallipoli, Beersheba and Jerusalem ensured for them a place as one of Australia's most revered battle units, and a reputation as one of the most successful cavalry forces in history. The complex at Enoggera is closely associated with Queensland's cavalry units, particularly the 2nd Light Horse, descended from the Queensland colonial militia, and the Queensland Mounted Infantry and Mounted Rifles, over 2000 of whom were trained at Enoggera for battle as the first colonial Australian force to be committed to the South African War of 1899–1902.

These buildings were designed by Thomas Pye, Queensland's Deputy Government Architect, between 1910 and 1913. Pye, his superior, A. B. Brady, and his colleagues at the Queensland Government Architects Office, contributed a considerable number of buildings for the Commonwealth government in the post-federation period.
