= School of Musketry, Enoggera =

School of Musketry
- Location within Queensland
- 27.4244°S 152.9859°E
- Location: 431 Lloyd Street, Gallipoli Barracks, Enoggera, Brisbane, Queensland, Australia

Commonwealth Heritage List
- Official name: School Of Musketry (former)
- Type: Listed place (Historic)
- Designated: 22 June 2004
- Reference no.: 105227

School of Musketry is a heritage-listed former military installation at 431 Lloyd Street, Gallipoli Barracks, Enoggera, Brisbane, Queensland, Australia. It was added to the Australian Commonwealth Heritage List on 22 June 2004.

The former School of Musketry is one of the two oldest buildings at the Gallipoli Barracks, formerly known as Enoggera Army Camp. Built in 1910, it served as a small arms training facility, a military tactics school, a supply depot, officers residence and as married quarters. It presently serves as an Army chapel, the All Saints Chapel.

== History ==
The Enoggera Army Camp, renamed Gallipoli Barracks in 1990, was synonymous with Army training in Queensland for many years. It was responsible for the training of thousands of Queenslanders for service in World War I and World War II, and subsequent conflicts. The broader defence area at Enoggera has a considerable history of association with military activities, dating back to 1855. It is believed that British Imperial troops, based at Bulimba on the southern bank of the river, used the area for training exercises from as early as 1855. Rifle and training ranges, including the old Toowong Rifle Range, were established there and subsequently used by civilian groups such as the Queensland Rifle Association and the Queensland defence forces, including volunteer militia. Many Queensland troops sent to the Boer War in South Africa in the 1890s also trained here.

After Federation in 1901 the Australian Government became responsible for defence matters, although a fully coordinated national defence force did not arise for a number of years. Once Commonwealth military units began to be established in earnest, the government began to acquire property on a large-scale to facilitate training and accommodation of its forces. The land at Enoggera was acquired by the Commonwealth as part of this process in 1908. The acquisition amalgamated four separate properties: Thompson's Paddock, Rifle Paddock, Fraser's Paddock and Bell Paddock, comprising a total of 1,235 acres (500 ha). The first major improvement made by the Commonwealth was the development of a new rifle range, with mounds targets and shelter sheds.

The initial rifle range development at the site was followed by a prolonged period of initial development of the site, dating into the 1920s. The School of Musketry, Small Arms Magazine Store and to Cordite Magazines were erected in 1910 and 1911. These were followed by the explosives laboratory and the expense magazine in 1912. A cavalry remount section barracks was built in 1913, including a general barracks block, infirmary and farriery. Four more explosives magazines were built in 1913, and an additional magazine in 1915. The 1917–1920s period saw a number of hospital buildings and mobilisation stores also established.

In the years since this period the site has been constantly developed and expanded in line with the Army's changing requirements, although many of the earliest buildings have survived with their authenticity and integrity largely intact.

The site has a long association with a civilian organisation, the Queensland Rifle Association. The site was used by the Association in the 1850s and 1860s, but another site at Toowong was favoured by the club by the time the Commonwealth acquired the Enoggera properties. As soon as 1908 the rifle association had returned to Enoggera, seemingly sharing the facilities with the military for a number of years.

== School of musketry ==
The School of Musketry and the Small Arms Magazine were constructed in 1910, the first substantial buildings on the site. These two buildings were functionally related, although some 150 metres apart, and they maintain a strong visual relationship. They were closely related to the initial function of the Enoggera site as a rifle range. Both buildings, as well as numerous other early buildings at the complex, were designed by Thomas Pye, Deputy Government Architect of the Queensland Public Works Department, under the supervision of Government Architect A. B. Brady. From the early 1890s until the end of World War I the Queensland Government Architect's office was prolific in its output of new public buildings for both the Queensland and Commonwealth Governments. In the early post-Federation years the Queensland Public Works Department often constructed new buildings on behalf of the Commonwealth, which had insufficient resources to undertake many new projects. The time during which Brady was Government Architect coincided with an almost golden age of public construction in Queensland. A talented team of architects was on hand at various times during this time, including Brady, Pye and John Smith Murdoch. During his tenure as Chief Architect, Southern Division and then Deputy Government Architect, Pye designed or supervised plans for a number of Queensland's more prominent public buildings of the Federation period, including the Rockhampton Customs House, the Stanthorpe Post Office, the Woolloongabba Post Office and the Naval Offices in Brisbane.

The School of Musketry was intended to educate recruits in the art of weapons handling, firing and tactics. It was used for this purpose until 1939, with the onset of World War II, when it became the Northern Command Training School, which ran specialist courses in military tactics for personnel from all Army ranks. At the conclusion of the war it was used as a supply depot during which time it remained unoccupied. After 1959 the building was adapted and converted into a residence for the senior RAEME Officer and by the late 1960s it had been adapted again as married quarters. This function was maintained until 1982, when the building was converted into a multi-denomination chapel and renamed All Saints Chapel.

== Description ==
The former School of Musketry is designed in the Federation Free style of architecture. It is a single story red brick structure with a galvanised iron hipped gable roof with a pedimented entry and ventilated gable. The roof extends to cover a concrete paved verandah which surrounds two thirds of the front wing of the building, the former lecture room. The most striking external feature is a decorative ventilator fleche with a conical cap, placed at the apex of the roof, which is connected to ventilation grilles in each of the main rooms of the building.

The building is laid out in a symmetrical plan, with a main central lecture hall, and two wings to the left and right, leaving a small built-in courtyard to the rear. The left hand wing was designed for offices, including a pay office, whilst the right wing was for the armoury and rifle racks.

The architecture of the building presents a strong response to climatic considerations of the sub tropics. Each of the main rooms was designed with a door that would open to the outside, while the roof and verandah provides shade to most rooms.

The building's function has changed several times during its life to date, necessitating some changes, but most of the permanent changes have been minor, while significant changes have been substantially reversed since the conversion from married quarters to chapel in 1982. The main changes occurred during the adaptation from stores building to residence. Internal studded partitions were installed, especially in the lecture hall area, to create a number of bedrooms. In addition, the rear courtyard became enclosed and a kitchen and laundry installed to the rear. The conversion to All Saints chapel, however, has reversed much of this, with the internal partitions removed. The kitchen remains and the laundry has been converted to toilets. Many of the original doors and door furniture, fanlights, double-hung sash windows and architraves are intact.

== Condition ==
The building is in very sound condition. Externally there have been some modifications to fenestration, and internally alterations were carried out in 1960s to convert to married quarters including new bathroom, kitchen, and toilet. However, the original fabric is substantially intact.

== Heritage listing ==
The former School of Musketry, Gallipoli Barracks, Enoggera, is significant as one of the two oldest substantial buildings at the former Enoggera Army Base.

School Of Musketry was listed on the Australian Commonwealth Heritage List on 22 June 2004 having satisfied the following criteria.

Criterion A: Processes

The former School of Musketry, Gallipoli Barracks, Enoggera, was built in 1910 and the building, along with the Small Arms Magazine and the Enoggera Magazine Complex, form a suite of buildings designed by Queensland Government Architect's office on behalf of the recently formed Commonwealth Government. The early development of the Enoggera military complex reflects the development of the Commonwealth's national defensive capabilities. It is significant for its service to the Commonwealth as a training facility for the use of armaments in World War I, and for the education of troops in military tactics during World War II.

Criterion B: Rarity

The building is one of the two oldest substantial buildings at the former Enoggera Army Base and may be one of the oldest buildings in Queensland built specifically for the Australian Army.

Criterion D: Characteristic values

The building is a strong example of the Federation Free style of architecture adapted to military purposes. The building has strong integrity and authenticity, allowing for interpretation of its use as a military educational facility, whilst being well adapted to its present use as an Army chapel.

Criterion F: Technical achievement

The symmetrical design and ornamental features, particularly the ventilation fleche are strongly linked with the original function of the structure, as well its climatic context.

Criterion H: Significant people

The building is a good example of the many accomplished government structures designed by Queensland's Deputy Government Architect at the time, Thomas Pye, and other members of this office, during the Federation period.
