= Small Arms Magazine, Enoggera =

Small Arms Magazine
- Location within Queensland
- 27.4247°S 152.9848°E
- Location: Murray Avenue, Gallipoli Barracks, Enoggera, Queensland, Australia

Commonwealth Heritage List
- Official name: Small Arms Magazine (former)
- Type: Listed place (Historic)
- Designated: 22 June 2004
- Reference no.: 105228

The Small Arms Magazine is a heritage-listed former military installation at Murray Avenue, Gallipolli Barracks, Enoggera, Brisbane, Queensland, Australia. It was added to the Australian Commonwealth Heritage List on 22 June 2004.

The Small Arms Magazine at Enoggera is one of the two oldest buildings at the Gallipoli Barracks, formerly known as Enoggera Army Camp. Built in 1910, it served as a secure storage facility for rifle and pistol ammunition, in association with the rifle range and the nearby School of Musketry.

== History ==
The Enoggera Army Camp, renamed Gallipoli Barracks in 1990, was synonymous with Army training in Queensland for many years. It was responsible for the training of thousands of Queenslanders for service in World War I and World War II, and subsequent conflicts. The broader defence area at Enoggera has a considerable history of association with military activities, dating back to 1855. It is believed that British Imperial troops, based at Bulimba on the southern bank of the river, used the area for training exercises from as early as 1855. Rifle and training ranges, including the old Toowong Rifle Range, were established there and subsequently used by civilian groups such as the Queensland Rifle Association and the Queensland defence forces, including volunteer militia. Many Queensland troops sent to the Boer War in South Africa in the 1890s also trained here.

After Federation in 1901 the Australian Government became responsible for defence matters, although a fully coordinated national defence force did not arise for a number of years. Once Commonwealth military units began to be established in earnest, the government began to acquire property on a large-scale to facilitate training and accommodation of its forces. The land at Enoggera was acquired by the Commonwealth as part of this process in 1908. The acquisition amalgamated four separate properties: Thompson's Paddock, Rifle Paddock, Fraser's Paddock and Bell Paddock, comprising a total of 1,235 acres (500 ha). The first major improvement made by the Commonwealth was the development of a new rifle range, with mounds targets and shelter sheds.

The initial rifle range development at the site was followed by a prolonged period of initial development of the site, dating into the 1920s. The School of Musketry, Small Arms Magazine Store and to Cordite Magazines were erected in 1910 as part of a functional complex associated with the rifle range. These were followed by the explosives laboratory and the expense magazine in 1912. A cavalry remount section barracks was built in 1913, including a general barracks block, infirmary and farriery. Four more explosives magazines were built in 1913, and an additional magazine in 1915. The 1917–1920s period saw a number of hospital buildings and mobilisation stores also established.

In the years since this period the site has been constantly developed and expanded in line with the Army's changing requirements, although many of the earliest buildings have survived with their authenticity and integrity largely intact.

The site has a long association with a civilian organisation, the Queensland Rifle Association. The site was used by the Association in the 1850s and 1860s, but another site at Toowong was favoured by the club by the time the Commonwealth acquired the Enoggera properties. As soon as 1908 the rifle association had returned to Enoggera, seemingly sharing the facilities with the military for a number of years.

== Small arms magazine ==
The School of Musketry and the Small Arms Magazine were constructed in 1910, the first substantial buildings on the site. These two buildings were functionally related, although some 150 metres apart, and they maintain a strong visual relationship today. Both buildings, as well as numerous other early buildings at the complex, were designed by Thomas Pye, Deputy Government Architect of the Queensland Public Works Department, under the supervision of Government Architect A. B. Brady. From the early 1890s until the end of World War I the Queensland Government Architect's office was prolific in its output of new public buildings for both the Queensland and Commonwealth Governments. In the early post-Federation years the Queensland Public Works Department often constructed new buildings on behalf of the Commonwealth, which had insufficient resources to undertake many new projects. The time during which Brady was Government Architect coincided with an almost golden age of public construction in Queensland. A talented team of architects was on hand at various times during this time, including Brady, Pye and John Smith Murdoch. During his tenure as Chief Architect, Southern Division and then Deputy Government Architect, Pye designed or supervised plans for a number of Queensland's more prominent public buildings of the Federation period, including the Rockhampton Customs House, the Stanthorpe and Woolloongabba Post Offices and Naval Offices in Brisbane.

The Small Arms Magazine was designed for storage of ammunition and cartridges for rifles, pistols and other small arms. Trainees receiving instruction at the School of Musketry would have been allocated ammunition at the Small Arms Magazine prior to heading out to the range for firing practice. The importance of the rifle range and other live firing facilities at Enoggera is illustrated in the Army base's contribution to Australia's preparations for multiple military conflicts, including two World Wars. The magazine remained in use for its original purpose from 1910 until only recently.

== Description ==
The Small Arms Magazine is a 10.5-by-8.1-metre (34 ft × 27 ft) single storey, red brick building in the Federation style of architecture. It has a simple, gable hipped, galvanized iron roof, with a conical ventilator fleche, connected to the internal spaces via ventilation grilles. There is a verandah to the front which contains protected brick infill walls and a building-wide opening. The floors are concrete while the main walls are constructed in cavity brickwork.

Security is a specific theme of the building's design and finishes. The front access doors are metal, leading to a central passageway from which two main rooms, for the storage of ammunition are served. As late as the early 1980s a timber counter was in place, from behind which ammunition would be distributed, but this has since been removed. Casement windows, which open internally, were originally protected by steel shutters which have now been welded into place. The internal spaces have had internal partitions installed, constructed of timber framing and chain mesh.

Some internal fittings, such as ammunition cupboards, have been removed, but a strong interpretation of the building's original function is possible.

== Condition ==
As at 1995, the building was in almost original condition. The timber counter had been removed, as have some of the ammunition cupboards; otherwise few changes had occurred.

As at 2002, the building is no longer used for ammunition storage.

== Heritage listing ==
Small Arms Magazine was listed on the Australian Commonwealth Heritage List on 22 June 2004 having satisfied the following criteria.

Criterion A: Processes

The Small Arms Magazine was constructed in 1910 to complement the Enoggera Rifle Range, established by the Commonwealth in 1908–09. The building has served Australia's military training needs through two World Wars and numerous other conflicts. Along with numerous other early buildings at Enoggera, the Small Arms Magazine also highlights early relationships between the Commonwealth and State, having been designed and built by the Queensland Government on the behest of the Commonwealth.

Criterion B: Rarity

The Small Arms Magazine, Gallipoli Barracks, Enoggera, is one of the two oldest buildings at the former Enoggera Army Base. The building demonstrates a particular function of the Australian defence forces in the immediate post-Federation period.

Criterion D: Characteristic values

The Small Arms Magazine is an important and intact example of a small arms ammunition storage building and although it is no longer used for its original purpose, its current appearance strongly illustrates its former use.

Criterion H: Significant people

The design of the building, by Thomas Pye, Queensland's Deputy Government Architect, demonstrate the quality and variety of government buildings designed by Pye and his colleagues, for both State and Commonwealth, in the Federation period.
