= Thomas Pye (architect) =

Australian architect (1861–1930)

- Born: 1861; Lancashire, England
- Died: 1930 (aged 68–69); South Africa
- Occupation: Architect
- Spouse: Emily Ruth Ivy
- Children: Juanita Pye
- Practice: Clark Bros.; Department of Public Works (Queensland)
- Buildings: Treasury Building, Brisbane; Rockhampton Customs House; Lands Administration Building

Thomas Pye (1861–1930) was an Australian architect. He worked for over 33 years in the Public Works Department in Queensland. Pye contributed significantly to major buildings including the completion of the Public Offices (Treasury Building) and Rockhampton Customs House, as well as the design for the Lands and Survey Offices (Lands Administration Building). He was responsible for the heightened expectations which produced the best public buildings yet seen in Queensland.

== Early life ==
Thomas Pye was born in 1861 in Lancashire, England to Edward Pye, a farmer, and Ellen Newett. After receiving “an excellent training” as an architect in England, Pye emigrated to the colonies in c.1882. In 1883, Pye married Emily Ruth Ivy in September, while living in Mosman Bay, Sydney.

== Clark and Pye ==
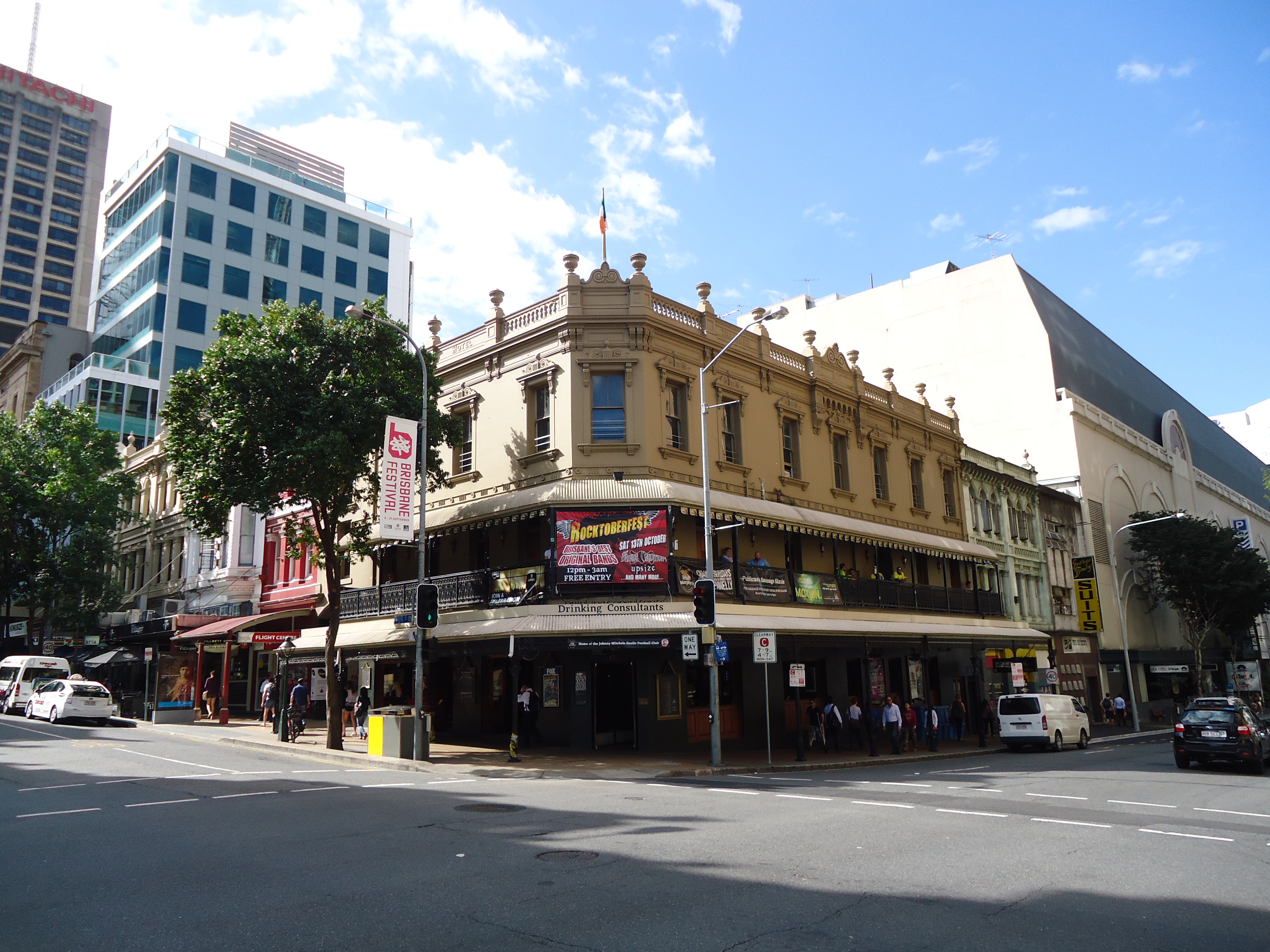
Imperial Hotel, 1885-1887

In 1884, Pye moved to Brisbane and joined the Queensland Public Works Department to take charge of the documentation of John James Clark’s design for the Brisbane Public Offices (Treasury Building). After completion of the plans for the first stage of the Public Offices, Pye resigned from his public post at the end of May 1885, and entered partnership with J.J. Clark’s brother George Cotton Clark, having previously prepared the drawings for Clark’s Bros’ Brisbane Masonic Hall while employed in the offices of J.J. Clark. He was involved in a number of projects while at the firm, most notably the Imperial Hotel in Brisbane. George Clark and Pye ended their partnership in early May 1886.

== Public Offices (Treasury Building), Brisbane ==
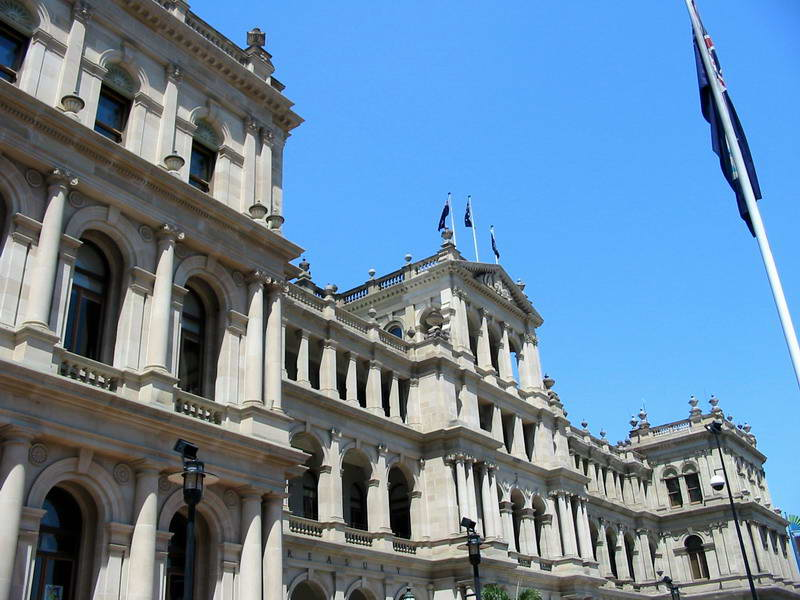
The Public Offices (Treasury Building) for which Pye prepared drawings between 1884-1890

In June 1886 Pye rejoined the Works Department to prepare drawings for the Public Offices. Pye is associated with the preparation of the plans for the first and second sections of the Public Offices – those facing William Street and the Queen’s Gardens respectively. This was only a temporary appointment until he was appointed as a permanent draftsman in December 1889. During this time, Pye also engaged work with the tenderer for the project, Sydney contractors the Phippard Bros, in 1886 and 1887. In 1890, the drawings for the Public Offices were completed.

== Queensland Public Works Department ==
In 1892, A.B. Brady, the Engineer for Bridges, took charge of buildings as the Government Architect, and Pye was appointed Chief Draftsman. In 1898, Pye was appointed First Assistant Architect. In February 1902, Pye became District Architect, Southern Division with responsibility for Government buildings south of Gympie. His equivalent for the Northern Division was John Smith Murdoch. In 1904, John Smith Murdoch transferred to the Commonwealth. Consequently, Pye assumed responsibility for the whole of Queensland. In September 1906, Pye was appointed deputy Government Architect and Acting Under Secretary and continued in that office until his retrenchment in August 1921.

== Other interests and military involvement ==
Pye was a military censor for about five months in 1914, and in September 1915, as a lieutenant-colonel, he was detailed to command Australian Imperial Forces reinforcements on transports. He took keen interest in shooting and was a prominent member of local rifle clubs. The lack of success in private practice may conceal a resumption of his previous role as a gun draftsman.

== Later life and death ==
After leaving the Works Department, Pye practiced privately in Brisbane. An amateur artist, he was a member of the Queensland Authors’ and Artists’ Association and was a collector for the Queensland Museum. In May 1929 Pye left Brisbane to travel overseas. In 1930, Pye died after catching black-water fever at the Victoria Falls in South Africa. His daughter, Juanita Pye, was one of Queensland’s first female architects.

== Significant works ==
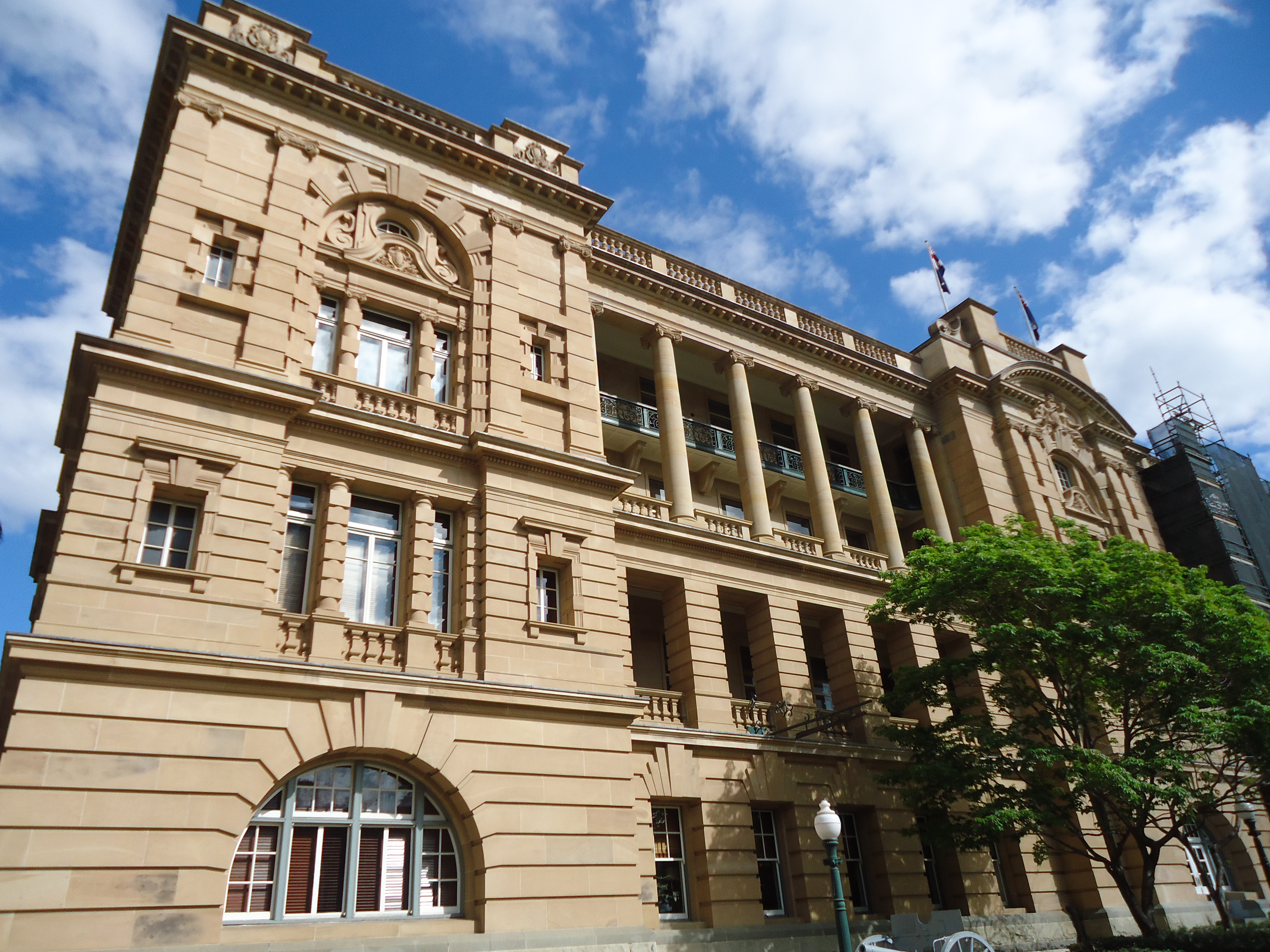
Land Administration Building, 1901-1905

Responsibility for individual projects during his employment at the Public Works Department is difficult to discern. The Lands and Survey Offices (Land Administration Building) are considered Pye’s masterpiece. The significant stylistic and technical innovations used in the design of the Lands Offices such as the use of concrete and the Edwardian Baroque style make them almost a decade ahead of comparable Australian buildings. Pye personally supervised the details, including the statuary.

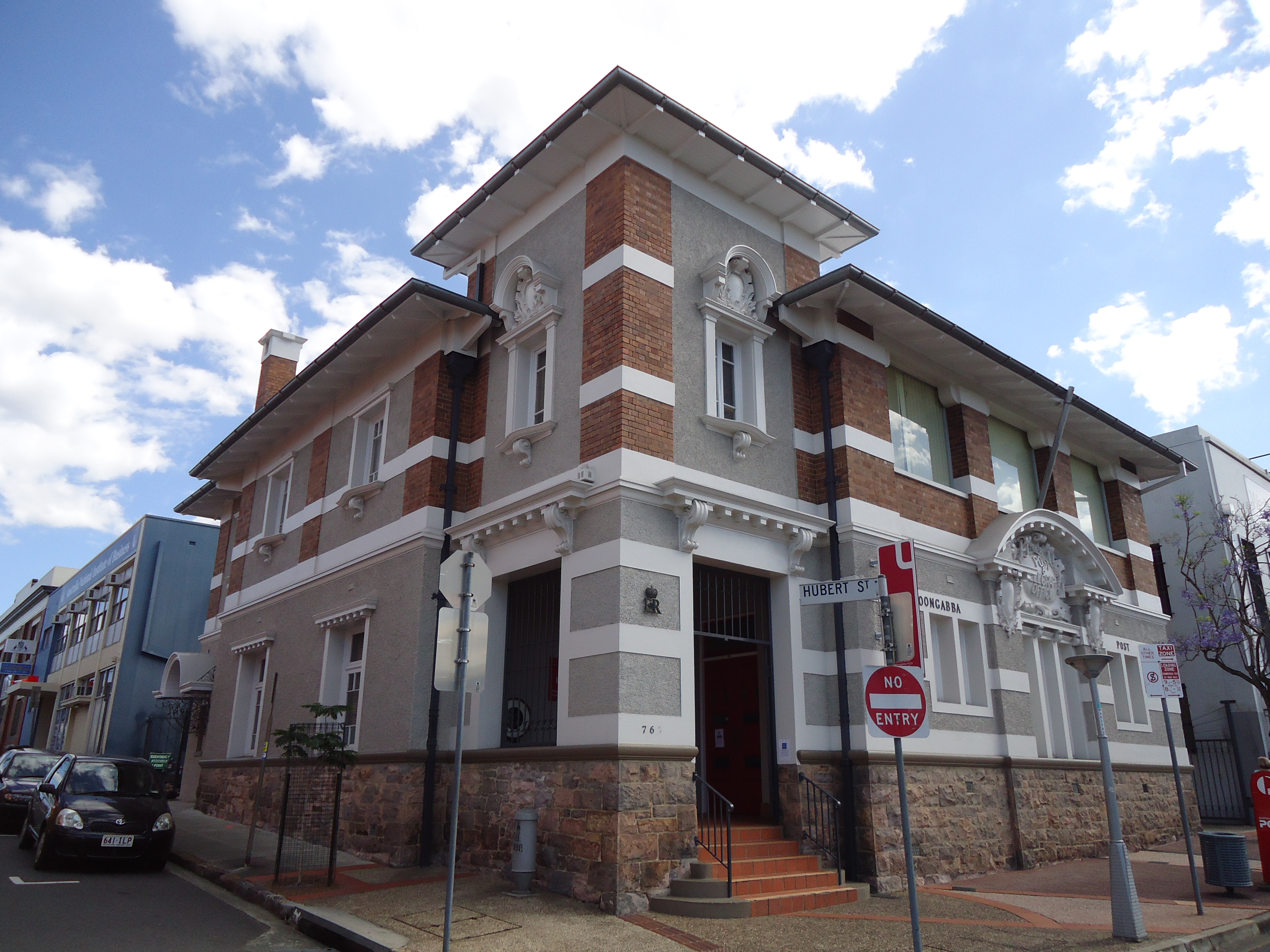
Woolloongabba Post Office (former), 1905

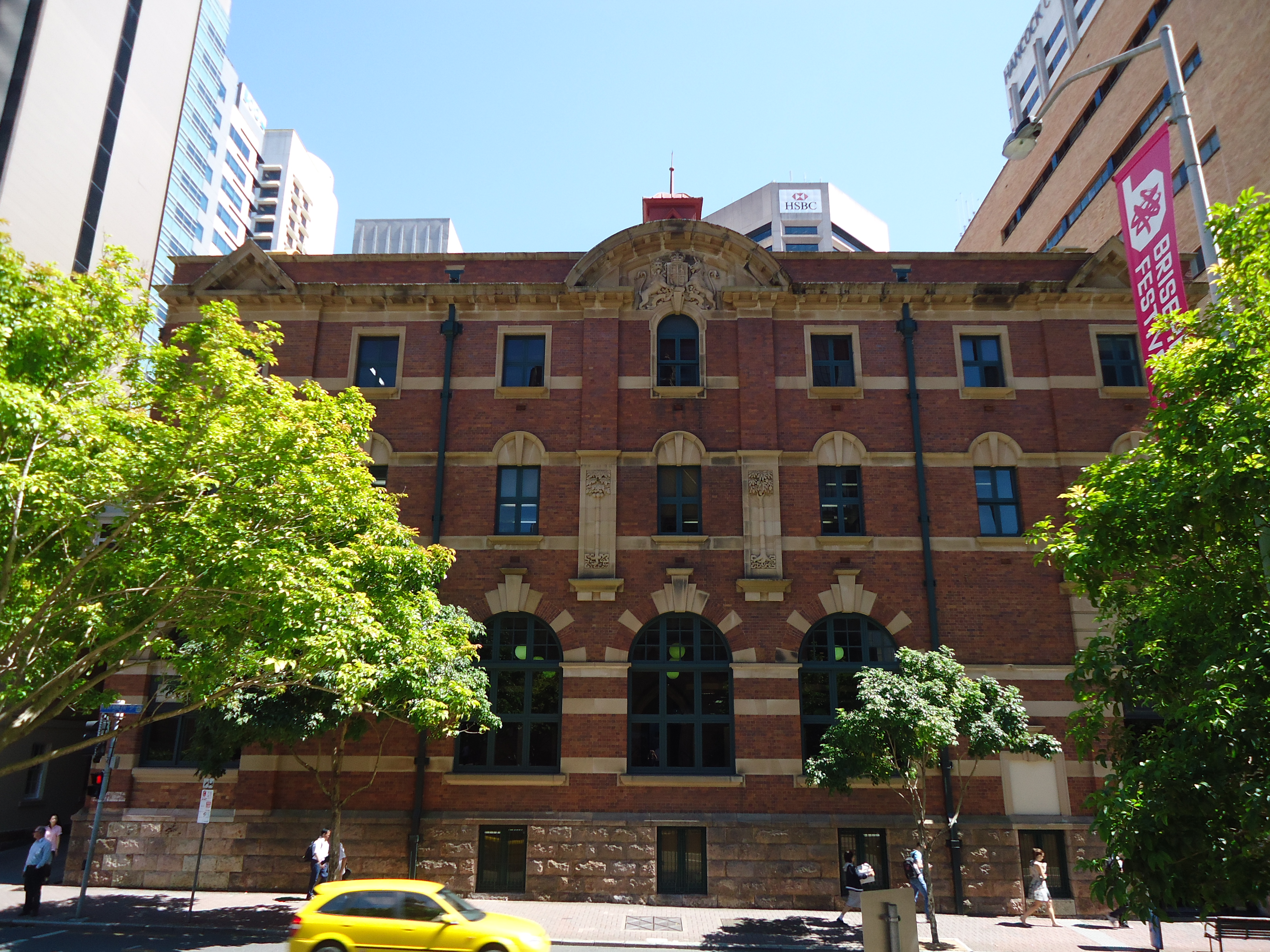
Brisbane General Post Office, Elizabeth Street additions, 1908

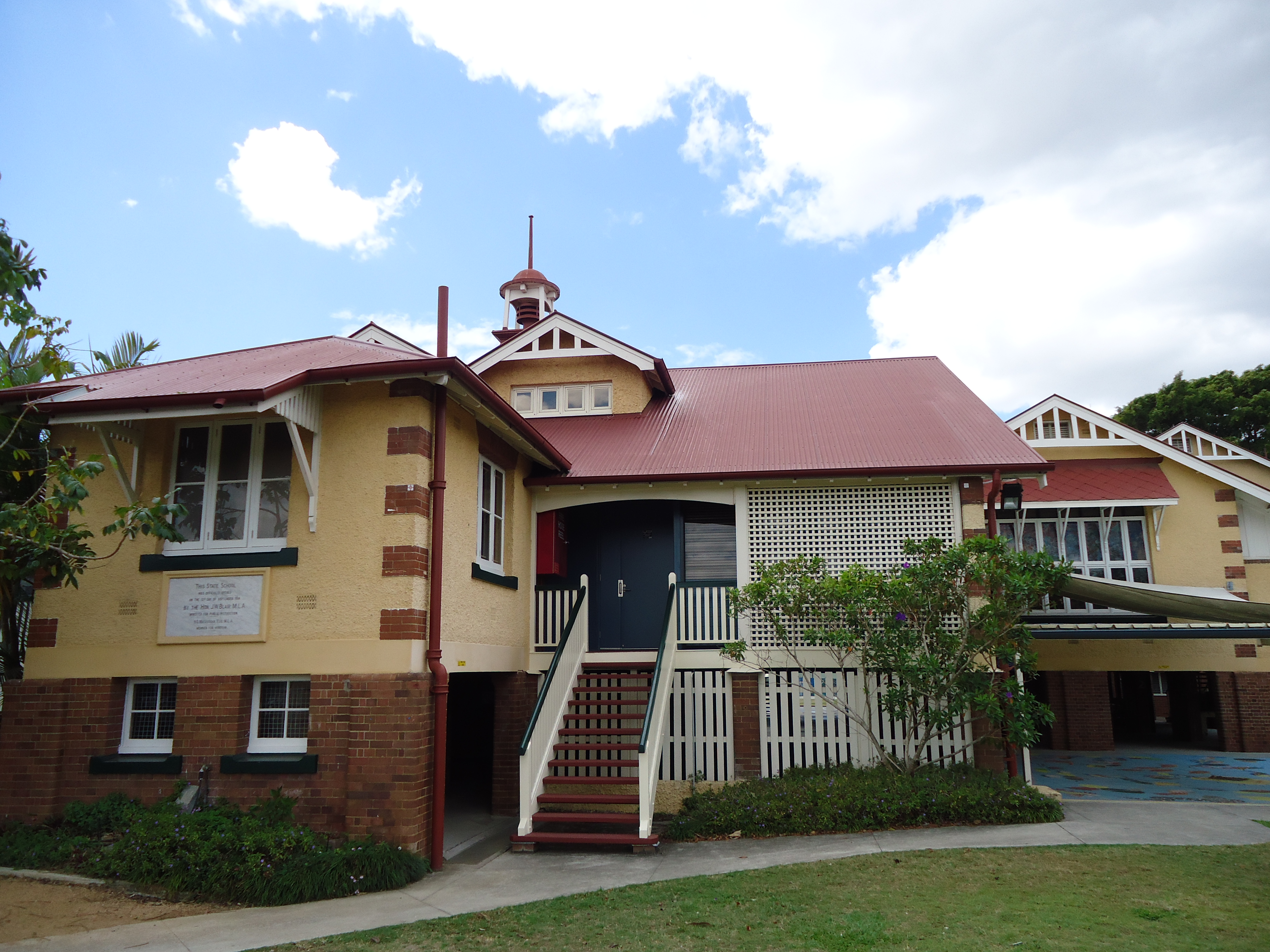
Wooloowin State School, 1914

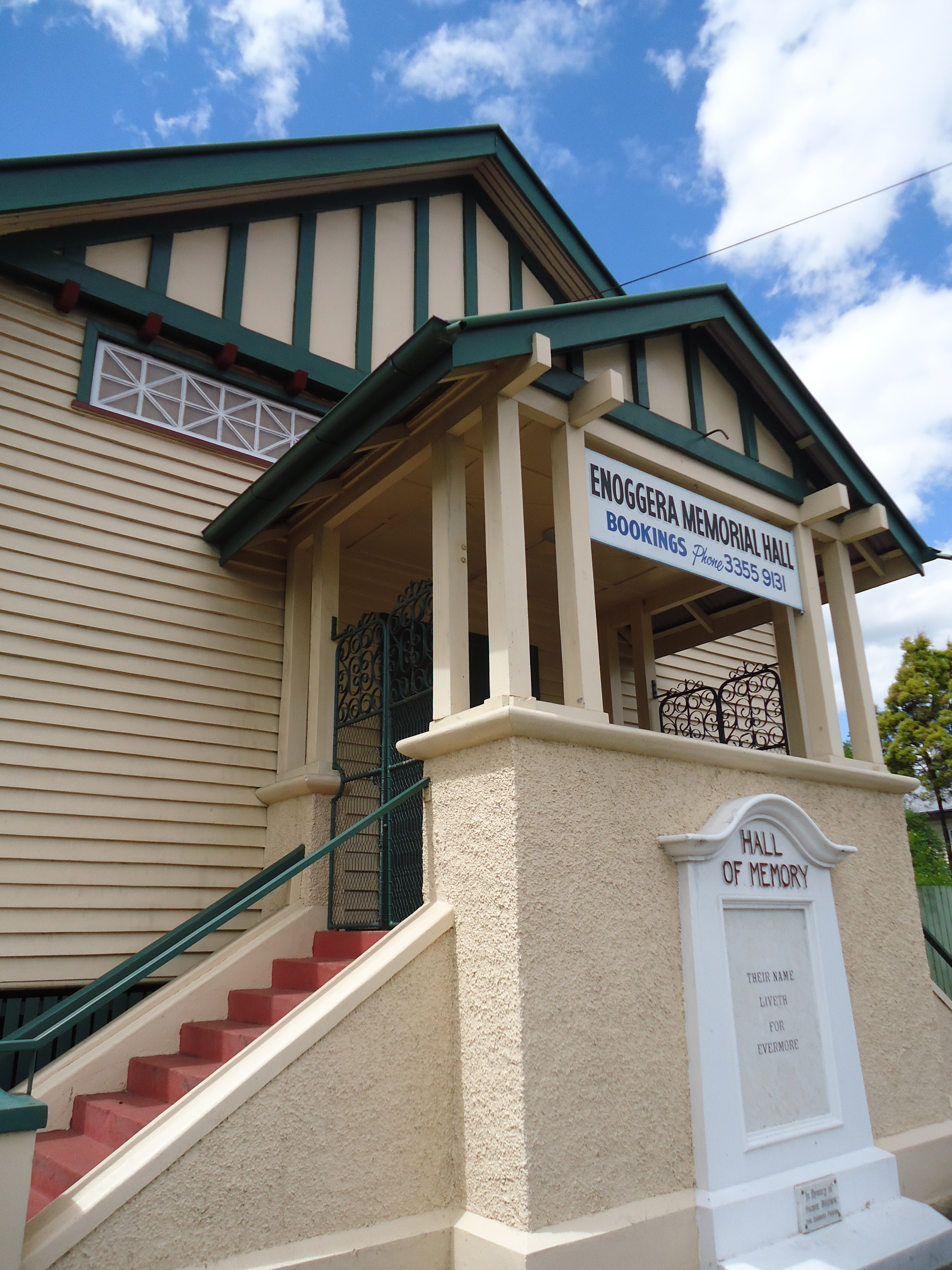
Enoggera Memorial Hall and School of Arts,1925

Year completed	Structure name	Location	Notes
1885	Villa and Stable for W. Pickering (as Clark and Pye); (no longer exists)	Lytton Road, East Brisbane	
1885	Cottage (as Clark and Pye); (no longer exists)	Remy Street, Petrie Bight	
1885–1887	Imperial Hotel (as Clark and Pye)	70 George Street, Brisbane	
1889	Relief Stonework Panels, Alice Street Wing, Parliament House	69 Alice Street, Brisbane	
1897–1898	Post Office, Warwick	98 Palmerin Street, Warwick	
1898	Department of Primary Industries Building William Street facade	99 William Street, Brisbane	
1898–1899	Queensland Stock Institute (also known as the Bacteriological Institute, or the Director of Boarding Residence, Brisbane Grammar School)	College Road, Spring Hill	
1899	Customs House Rockhampton (designed with G.D. Payne)	208 Quay Street, Rockhampton	
1899–1900	East Brisbane State School	90 Wellington Road, East Brisbane	
1899–1900	Post Office, Ipswich	114 Brisbane Street, Ipswich	
1900	Police Station, Warwick	86 Fitzroy Street, Warwick	
?1901	Killarney Courthouse; (no longer exists)	Killarney	
1901	Naval Offices	3 Edward St, Brisbane	
1901	Decoration of Government Buildings in Brisbane (Customs House, the Treasury Buildings, Geological Museum, Lands Office, Government Printing Office, and various others)	Primarily George, Queen and William Streets, Brisbane	
1901	Stanthorpe Post Office	14 Maryland St, Stanthorpe	
1901–1905	Land Administration Building (formerly Executive Building)	142 George Street, Brisbane	
1904	Former North Ward Defence Complex additions (drill hall and administration offices)	4–6 Oxley Street, North Ward	
1905	Woolloongabba Post Office (former)	765 Stanley Street, Woolloongabba	
?1906–1921 date unknown	“Tekowai” House for W.G. Chancellor; (no longer exists)	Vulture Street, South Brisbane	
1908	Brisbane General Post Office, Elizabeth Street additions	280 Elizabeth Street, Brisbane	
1909	Former Dispenser’s House, Diamantina Hospital	Cornwall Street, Woolloongabba	
1910	Charters Towers Police Station (formerly Charters Towers Police Barracks)	49 Gill Street, Charters Towers	
1910	School of Musketry (former)	431 Lloyd St, Gallipoli Army Barracks, Enoggera	
1910	Small Arms Magazine (former)	Murray Av, Enoggera Barracks, Enoggera	
1911–1912	Mackay Technical College (former)	Alfred Street, Mackay	
1911–1915	Brisbane Central Technical College (former)	2 George Street, Brisbane	
1911–1915	Enoggera Magazine Complex	Inwood Rd, Enoggera Military Camp, Enoggera	
1913	Remount Complex (former)	Wynter Rd, Enoggera	
1914	Wooloowin State School	663 Lutwyche Road, Lutwyche	
1914	‘A’ Block Central Queensland Institute of Technical and Further Education (TAFE) Rockhampton Campus (formerly ‘A’ Block, Rockhampton State High School and Technical College)	Bolsover Street, Rockhampton	
1914–1915	Warwick Technical College and State High School	Victoria Street, Warwick	
1914–1915	Windsor State School	270 Lutwyche Rd, Windsor	
1915–1916	Block ‘C’, Rockhampton District Court (formerly Rockhampton Branch of the Queensland State Government Savings Bank)	42 East Street, Rockhampton	
1916–1917	Toowoomba Technical College (former)	124 Margaret Street, Toowoomba	
1919	‘D’ Block, Rockhampton State High School and Technical College; (demolished 1997-98)	Alma Street, Rockhampton	
1919–1921	Cairns Court House (former)	38–40 Abbott St, Cairns	
1925	Enoggera Memorial Hall and School of Arts	Cnr Trundle and Wardell Streets, Enoggera	

== See also ==
- Queensland Heritage Register
