= 7th Combat Service Support Battalion (Australia) =

Logistics unit of the Australian Army

- Active: 1997–present
- Country: Australia
- Branch: Australian Army
- Role: Support
- Part of: 7th Brigade
- Garrison/HQ: Gallipoli Barracks, Enoggera

Commanders
- Current commander: LTCOL Ross Thomas

Insignia
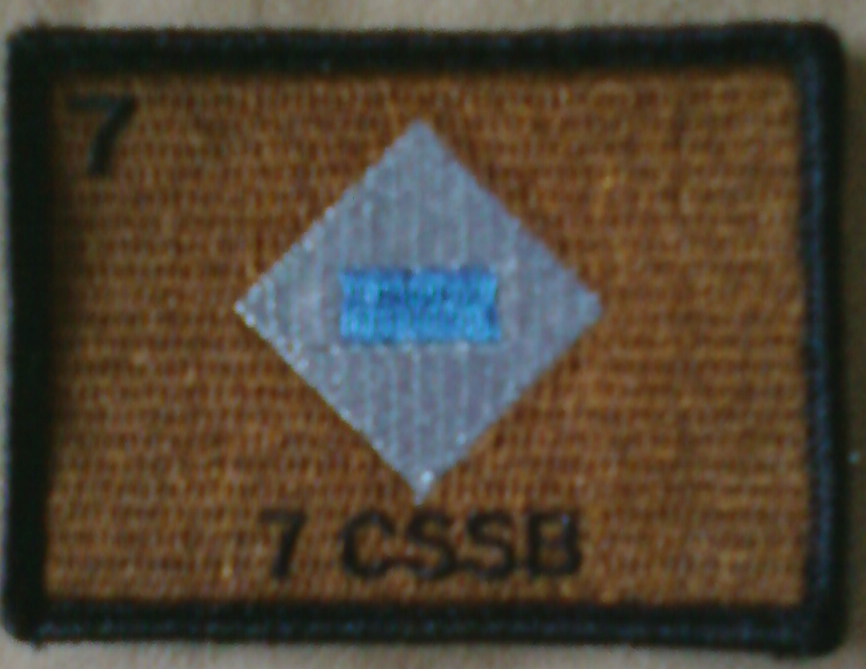
- DPCU Colour Patch

The 7th Combat Service Support Battalion (7 CSSB) is an Australian Army administration and logistics battalion which provides transport, supply and maintenance support services to units of the 7th Brigade. The battalion is made up of both Regular personnel and has recently been involved in deployments to Timor Leste, Iraq and Afghanistan.

== History ==
=== Formation ===
7 CSSB was formed on 1 July 1997 when the Meeandah-based 7th Brigade Administrative Support Battalion (7 BASB), a Reserve unit that had been formed in 1994, was amalgamated with the Enoggera-based 6th Brigade Administrative Support Battalion (6 BASB), an integrated Regular and Reserve unit that had been formed in 1993. This came about as a result of the decision to disband the 6th Brigade, which resulted in 7th Brigade becoming an integrated Regular and Reserve unit. By 1999, the battalion had an authorised strength of 647 personnel, of which 55 per cent were Reservists.

When the 7th Brigade was reorganised in 2007 as a primarily Regular motorised brigade, although major Reserve elements were transferred to the 11th Brigade, 7 CSSB continued to maintain a small Reserve element.

=== Operational experience ===
7 CSSB regularly supports operational deployments in all ADF theatres with individual and small group reinforcements. In late 2003, 7 CSSB supported the 6th Battalion, Royal Australian Regiment (6 RAR)-based "Australian Battalion IX" (AUSBAT 9) deployment to Timor Leste as part of Operation Citadel. They returned to Brisbane in mid-June 2004.

In 2005, elements of the battalion deployed to Iraq as part of SECDET, which was during Operation Catalyst. In 2007–08, the 7th Brigade provided the main force elements for the fourth rotation of the Australian Overwatch Battle Group (West) (OBG(W)-4). Elements of 7 CSSB deployed in support OBG(W)-4, whilst the unit also contributed personnel to the Australian Army Training Team (AATT).

In 2010, elements of the battalion were deployed to Afghanistan as part of Operation Slipper. While the majority of the battalion's force was part of the Force Support Unit based in Tarin Kowt, Kandahar and Al Minhad Air Base, elements also deployed in support of the 6 RAR-based 1st Mentoring Task Force (MTF-1) combined arms battle group that was deployed to Uruzgan province to conduct counter-insurgency operations.

== Current role and structure ==
Based at Gallipoli Barracks, Enoggera, in the northern suburbs of Brisbane, the battalion is staffed by Regular Army personnel from various service support corps of the Army. In 2012, the battalion underwent a significant restructure which saw both the detachment of Health Company to the Joint Health Command and 17th CSS Brigade, and the re-establishment of "corps-based" sub units. As a result, 7 CSSB now consists of a Battalion HQ, Administration Company, 5th Transport Squadron, 6th Field Supply Company, and 106th Field Workshop Squadron. This restructure is significant as it re-establishes the links with the unit's predecessors in 6 BASB and previously independent sub units.

In 2019, the battalion was under the command of Lieutenant Colonel Colin Lingo.

In October 2016, the battalion re-raised the 2nd Transport Squadron, consisting of 38 vehicles spread across two protected mobility vehicle troops and a medium-lift troop. The squadron traces its lineage back to the 2nd Company, Australian Army Service Corps, which was raised in August 1914 for service during World War.
