= Enoggera Barracks =

Australian Army military base in Brisbane

Site information
- Type: Military base
- Owner: Department of Defence
- Controlled by: Australian Army
- Open to the public: No
- Condition: Active

Site history
- In use: 1908–present

Garrison information
- Occupants: HQ 1st Division

Enoggera Barracks (HLS)
- IATA: none; ICAO: YENO

Summary
- Airport type: Military HLS
- Operator: Australian Army
- Location: Brisbane, Queensland
- Elevation AMSL: 145 ft (44 m)
- Coordinates: 27°25′30″S 152°59′00″E

Map
- Location in Queensland
- Sources: AIP

Enoggera Barracks (also known as Gallipoli Barracks) is an Australian Army base in the northwestern Brisbane suburb of Enoggera in Queensland, Australia. It was officially established in the early 20th century when the area was used for field training, although the area was used by military units as far back as the mid-19th century. Since then it has been developed into a modern military base, which is now home to units of the 7th and 11th Brigades as well as the headquarters of the 1st Division and the 16th Aviation Brigade.

== History ==
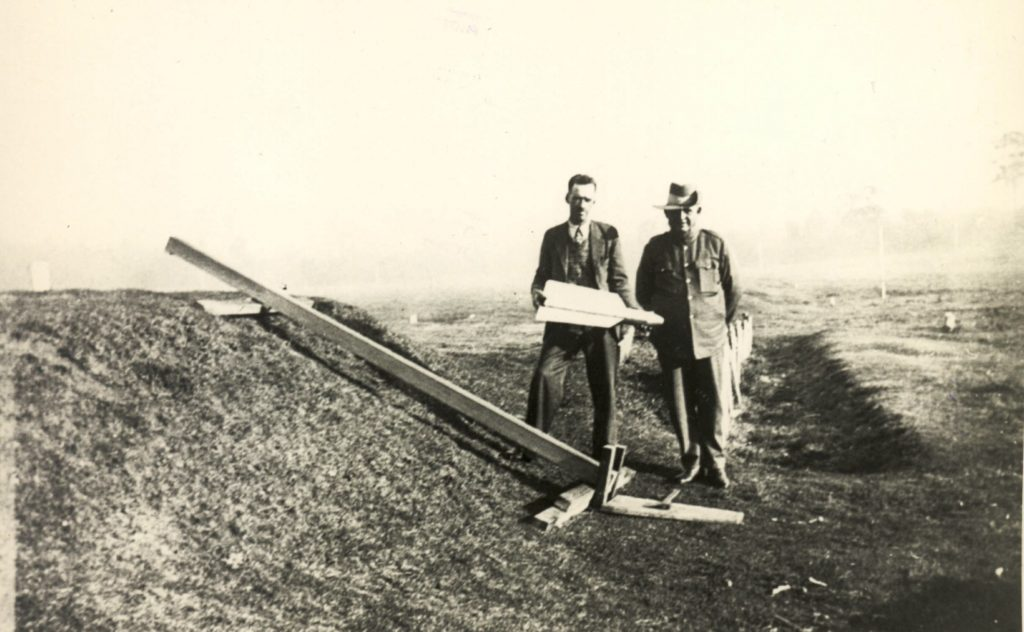
Sergeant Edward Creedy, on right, with a member of the Australian Rocket Society ready to launch the rocket at the Enoggera Rifle Range, 24 September 1936

The base has a long history, having been in existence officially since 1908, although the wider area has been used for military purposes since 1855. Upon its establishment, the camp consisted of four paddocks that were used for training and drill—Bell, Fraser's, Rifle and Thompson's—and a number of rifle ranges were established there for use by civilian groups and units of the militia. Since then the base facilities have been expanded as the Army's presence there has grown through its involvement in the two world wars and other conflicts.

On Anzac Day (25 April) 1990, it was renamed Gallipoli Barracks.

The base is home to the majority of 7th Brigade units. With the reorganisation of 7th Brigade in 2007, there are also a couple of units from the 11th Brigade based at Enoggera. It is one of the largest army bases in the country.

In January 2011, the base was the location of the headquarters for the Australian Defence Force's response to the 2010–11 Queensland floods, Operation Queensland Flood Assist.

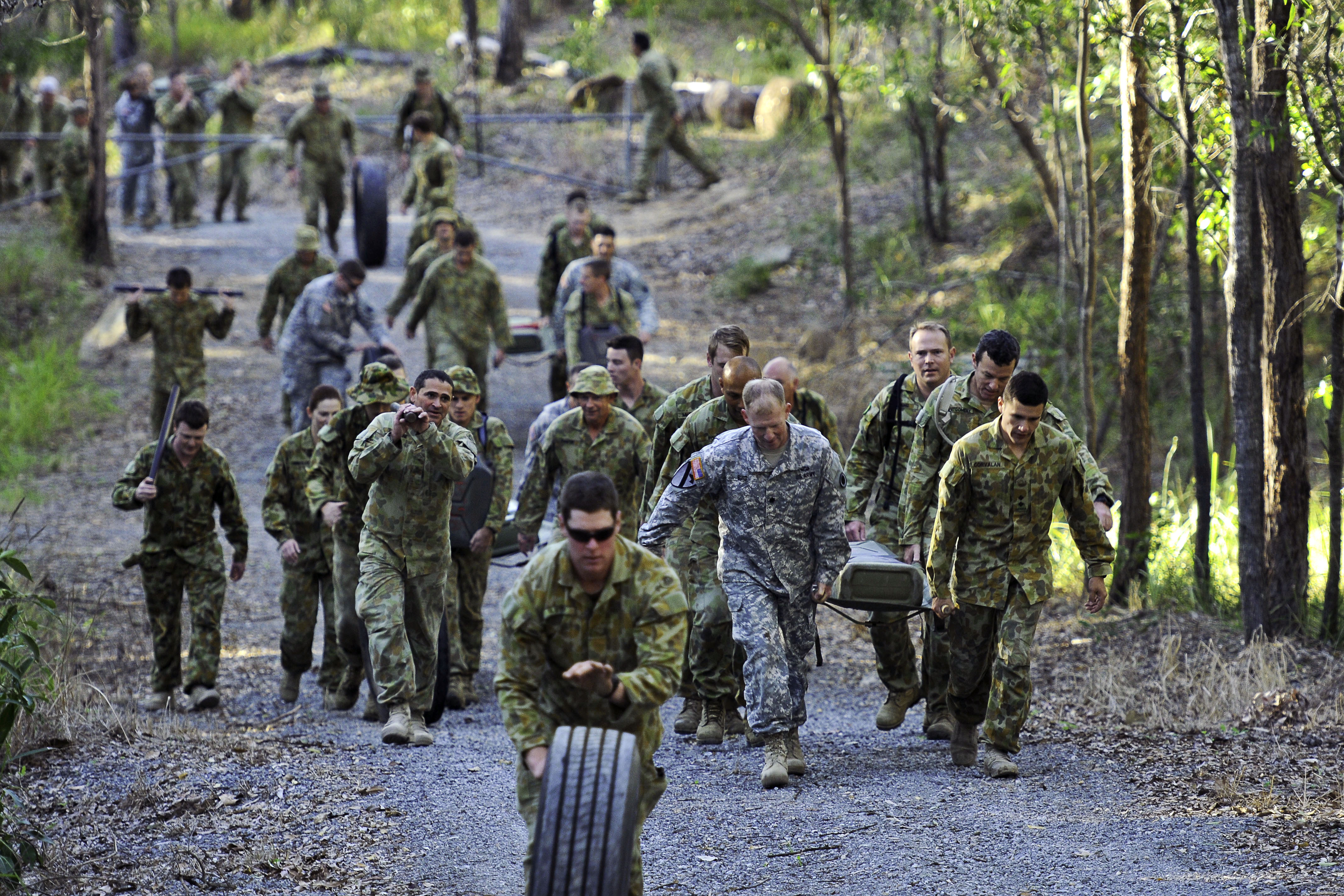
US and Australian soldiers at Enoggera Barracks during Talisman Sabre, 2015

The base facilities underwent a $770 million expansion, which raised the number of regular personnel based at Enoggera to about 5,600 in 2014. The upgrade included redeveloping the 7th Brigade's headquarters as well as construction of a new gym, an indoor pool and training centre, and an expansion of 8th/9th Battalion's lines, and new lines for 2CER and other units.

The Royal Australian Regiment Memorial Walk is located on the base.

== Current units ==
Formations

- HQ 1 DIV (DJFHQ)
  - HQ 7 BDE
  - HQ 16 BDE (Aviation)

Royal Australian Armoured Corps

- 2nd/14th Light Horse Regiment

Royal Australian Artillery

- 1st Regiment
  - 105th Medium Battery (This unit was formerly a field artillery unit until 2005)
- 20th Regiment
  - 131st Surveillance and Target Acquisition Battery
  - 132nd Unmanned Aerial Vehicle Battery
  - Combat Service and Support Battery

Royal Australian Engineers

- 2nd Combat Engineer Regiment
- 6th Engineer Support Regiment
  - 1st Topographic Survey Squadron
  - 21st Construction Squadron

Royal Australian Corps of Signals

- 1st Signal Regiment (DJFHQ/1DIV)
  - 101 Signal Squadron
- 7th Combat Signal Regiment (7BDE)
  - 139 Signal Squadron
  - 140 Signal Squadron
- 136 Signal Squadron (Fixed/Strategic)

Royal Australian Infantry Corps

- 6th Battalion, Royal Australian Regiment
- 8th/9th Battalion, Royal Australian Regiment
- 9th Battalion, Royal Queensland Regiment
- 25th/49th Battalion, Royal Queensland Regiment

Royal Australian Army Medical Corps

- Gallipoli Barracks Health Centre
- 2nd General Health Battalion
- 7th Combat Service Support Battalion
- Army Malaria Institute
- Area Health Services – South Queensland

Australian Army Band Corps

- 8/9 Battalion Royal Australian Regiment Pipes and Drums
- Australian Army Band – Brisbane
- Royal Australian Artillery Band – Brisbane

Royal Australian Corps of Military Police

- D Coy, 1 MP Battalion

Australian Army Cadets

- Headquarters South Queensland Australian Army Cadets Brigade
- 129 Army Cadet Unit

== Heritage listings ==
The base has a number of heritage-listed sites, including:

- Inwood Road: Enoggera Magazine Complex
- 431 Lloyd Street: School of Musketry
- Murray Avenue: Small Arms Magazine
- Wynter Road: Remount Complex

== See also ==
- List of airports in Queensland
