= Stanthorpe Post Office =

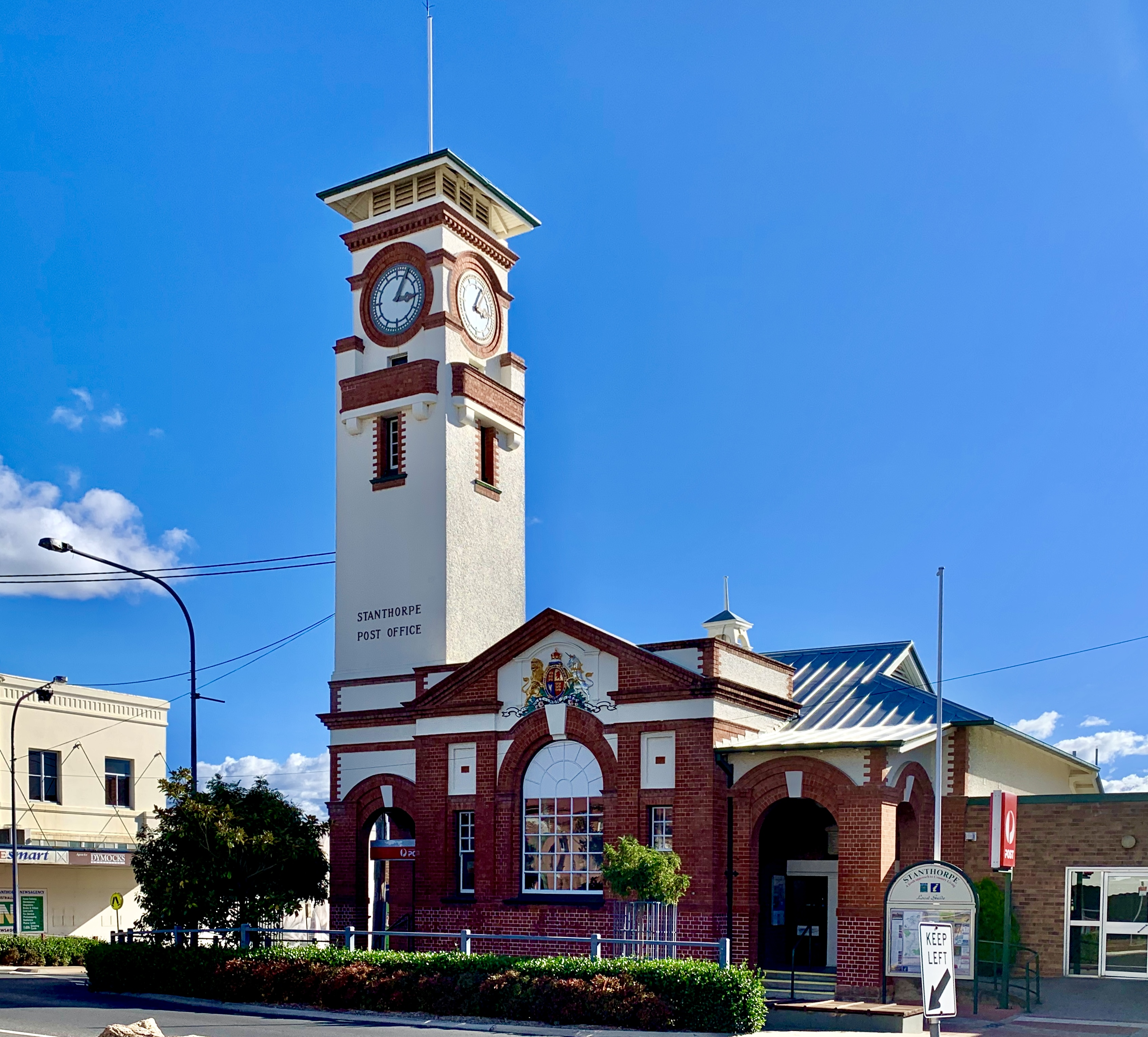
- Stanthorpe Post Office, 2019

- Location within Queensland
- 28.6556°S 151.9337°E
- Location: 14 Maryland Street, Stanthorpe, Southern Downs Region, Queensland, Australia

History
- Built: 1901

Site notes
- Architect: John Smith Murdoch
- Owner: Australia Post

Commonwealth Heritage List
- Official name: Stanthorpe Post Office
- Type: Listed place (Historic)
- Designated: 22 June 2004
- Reference no.: 105524
- Builders: D. Stewart and Co

Stanthorpe Post Office is a heritage-listed post office at 14 Maryland Street, Stanthorpe, Southern Downs Region, Queensland, Australia. It was designed by John Smith Murdoch of the Queensland Government Architect's office and was built by D. Stewart and Co in 1901. It was added to the Australian Commonwealth Heritage List on 22 June 2004.

== History ==
The Stanthorpe Post Office was completed in 1901, making it the first post-Federation post office to be built in Queensland, and possibly Australia. The new post and telegraph office replaced an earlier postal building which had been constructed in 1885. The plans for the new building were completed by the Queensland Government Architect's office, under the direction of Alfred Barton Brady, in October 1900. The building underwent alterations in 1963 when a northern wing was added. The site, at the northwest corner of Maryland and Railway streets, was previously occupied by the earlier timber post and telegraph office of 1884, which was moved to the rear of the site when the present building was constructed.

The postmaster's residential quarters are assumed to have been separate.

The design of the building has been attributed to John Smith Murdoch, with the Stanthorpe Post Office being his last design in southern Queensland before he was sent to the northern public works district. Murdoch would soon become the first design architect for the Australian Government. It was built by D. Stewart and Co in 1901. The clock came from England and was installed in 1903.

The post office underwent alterations in 1963 creating enlarged service delivery areas, amenities and a post office box lobby and the relocation of the post office post shops. The work involved the over-painting of stucco, removal of original chimneys to north and south sides of the building, illuminated signage, over-painting of upper portion of central fanlight window to façade; automatic sliding aluminium entrance door, concrete steps and retiled floor to entry porch, ramp to north porch, postal box enclosure to façade annexed from the original postal hall.

== Description ==
Stanthorpe Post Office is at 14 Maryland Street, corner Railway Street, Stanthorpe.

It was built in 1901 in an informal Arts and Crafts style mixed with Edwardian Baroque Revival elements.

The original building was one storey in height with a four-storey tower, consisting of:

- Structural frame: cavity brick. The base is rock faced coursed locally sourced granite and tuckpointed red brick with concrete piers.
- External walls: Brick with extensive cladding in textured stucco.
- Internal walls: Altered around 1963 with windows to north wall infilled.
- Floor: Timber framed
- Ceiling: beaded timber lining boards to porch soffits, v-jointed tongue and groove boarded trussed ceiling.
- Roof: half hipped form, of uncorrugated metal sheet with crimped joint coverings, beaded timber lining boards, pyramidal vented cupola.
- Flagpole with lightning conductor
- Rendered sills

The site has an extensive and largely unpaved yard area accommodating a car park, warehouse-depot for mail deliveries and a telecommunications tower.

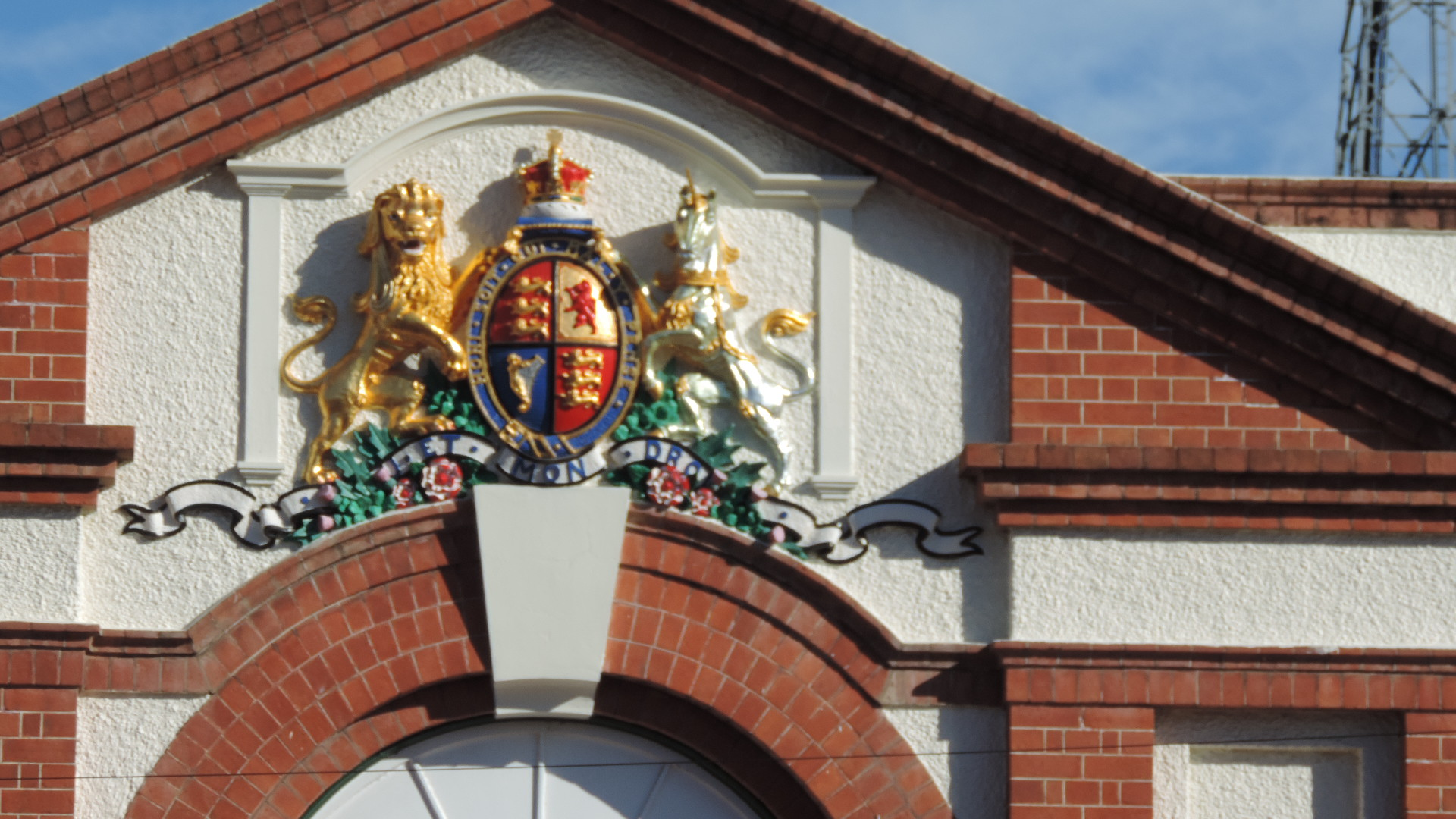
Royal coat of arms, 2015

The Maryland Street front is a basically symmetrical composition, but is confounded by the placement of a tall clock tower on the corner. The tower is formally linked to the postal hall elevation by a parapet-entablature line that extends an otherwise symmetrical parapet behind the main post hall breakfront. The Post Office has two prominent entrances, through arched corner porches to either side of the post hall wall and main window. This is treated as a breakfront and quasi-pediment, moulded at the top in a red brick cornice, and broken at its base line by a royal coat of arms and the keystone and upper arch of the central window. The window itself has a tympanum inside the arch and a multiple-paned main light, and is flanked by two tall rectangular windows with squared tympani above each light. The whole forms a Serlian group, framed and bisected by plain brick piers and two recessed piers below the main arch springing point, with brick mouldings suggesting a Tuscan order. The frieze below the pediment, matched by a frieze at the neighbouring tower base, is a combination of exposed brickwork and rough textured stucco, of a type soon seen in many Arts and Crafts houses in the capital cities from the 1900s on.

These materials are combined again in the parapet behind the pediment and the tower base, and in spandrels over the entry arches. On the Railway Street side the stuccoed frieze is punctuated by a series of diagonally angled struts supporting a broad eave, and a stretch of metal-clad roof in a catslide descending from a hipped gable between two stub-parapets. This theme is repeated on the north-east end of the Maryland Street elevation, where an exposed hipped gable flanks one side of the main breakfront. Both these elements recur in later Queensland Post Office designs such as Wooloongabba Post Office (1904) and Mount Morgan Post Office (1910) (in the masonry designs) and Cooroy Post Office of 1912–13 (in the timber series).

The clock tower is a plain stuccoed shaft, recalled in TR Hall's Sandgate Town Hall of 1911. The name is lettered 1/3 the way up the shaft. Tall vent windows topped with brick balconettes and corner piers capped with rounded red-brick frame a narrower oblong mass housing the clocks, which terminated with a brick cornice and a recessed arcade below a low-pitched pyramidal roof and louvred vents.

To the north there is a single level 1963 brown brick service wing addition, subsequently further extended during the late 1980s. It comprises mail delivery work areas, sorting spaces and additional post office box accommodation to Maryland Street. The west elevation of the original building comprises a timber-framed and weatherboard-clad addition, infilling what is thought to have been a previously open verandah flanked by brick lavatories. The brick enclosure to the south west has been extended by several courses of brickwork at an unknown date, and a small window removed and patched. The original paired doors to the original outer wall and one of the flanking windows removed. This is thought to have been a staggered addition, as the window forms differ and the weatherboards are not aligned and separated by a joint line.

Internally the original post shop to the east façade has been converted to form the post office box lobby, running north south behind the façade – with timber and glazed doors to the original entrances to either end, with arched glazed toplights. The original ceiling is concealed by a suspended grid-form acoustic tile ceiling and there is a fluorescent fitting mounted to its surface. The west wall of this lobby contains many of the post office boxes set into a non-original wall with aluminium framed glazing above.

Disabled access to the post shop is via the ramp to the northern porch and through the post office box lobby and into the entry porch at the street corner below the tower. This entry porch is of tuckpointed brick and there are non-original doors to the west – access to the retail area, fitted with an automatic sliding aluminium door with squared off infill to arched original opening above – and to the north – access to the post office box lobby, fitted with a timber panel door with glazed upper pane. These doors flank the curved brick corner wall and its inset painted timber panel door which leads to the tower. The tower is accessed via a timber stair with winders and an open timber balustrade. The tower walls are of over-painted brick. The clock mechanism appears to be intact.

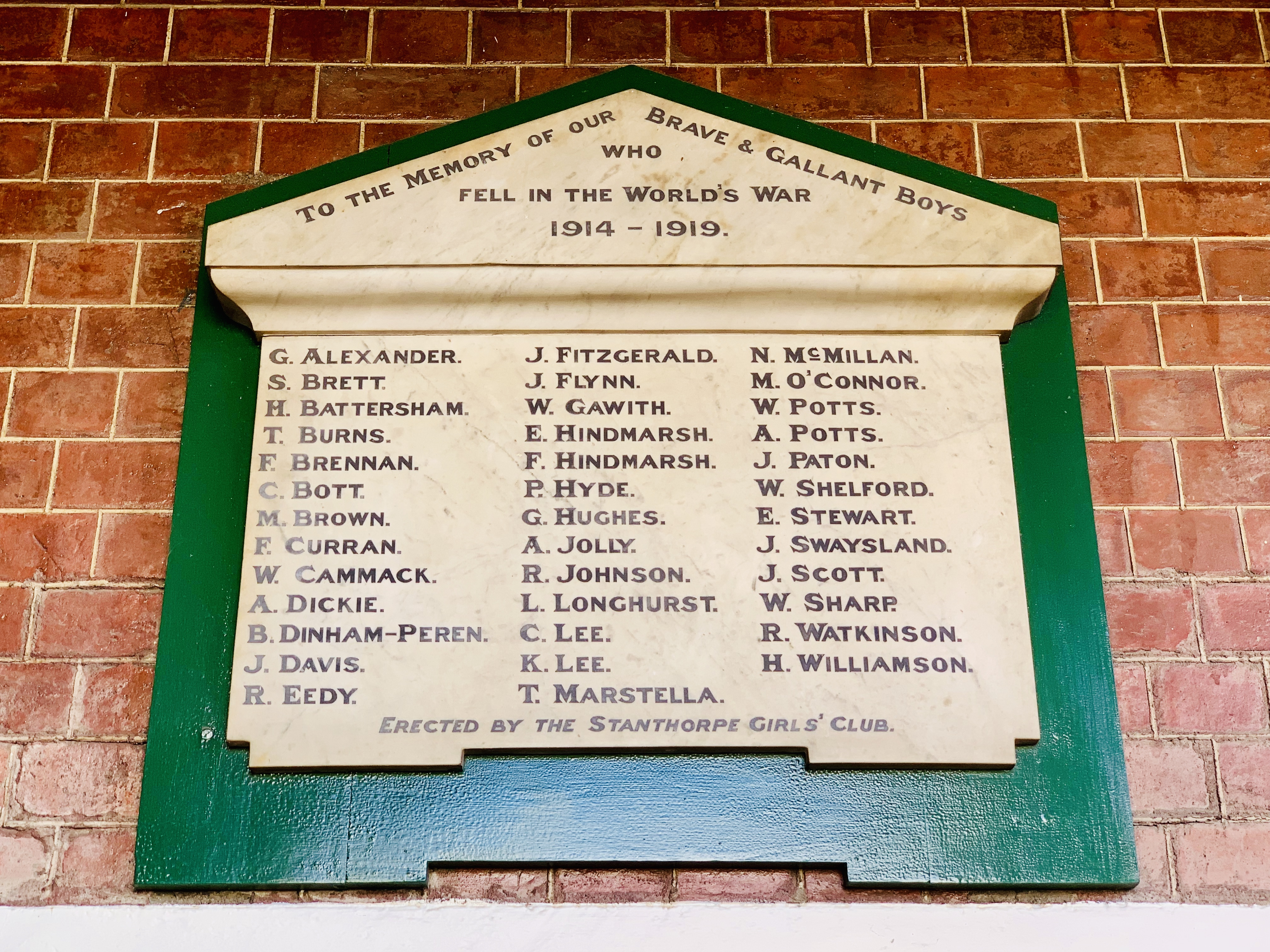
War memorial plaque, 2019

Within the building, the post shop now comprises the southern portion of the original post office space, and is divided from the working areas by a three-quarter height plasterboard partition. Originally the service counter was located beneath a large brick archway to the west facing into what is now the post office box lobby. The upper portion of this archway has been squared off, and partially infilled with plasterboard. The ceiling to this space is of v-jointed tongue-and-groove timber lining boards. The decorative timber trusses are exposed and there are decorative metal vents to the ceiling space above. The whole has been over-painted. The light fittings are "reproduction" style brass-finish type, fitted with milk-glass shades and are suspended from the trusses. The postal hall roof was restored in the late 1990s and the introduced air conditioning ducting and services are suspended below the ceiling. The walls are of over-painted brick and there is also timber picture rail. The floor is variously of carpet to the public area and of vinyl tile to the back of house spaces. The fitout to the public area is of standard Australia Post design with the counters diagonally placed in relation to the entry. Originally there were fireplaces to either side of the main space, but these have both been removed. The catalyst for this may have been the construction of the north extension – the breaking through of the north wall would have required the removal of the north fireplace and chimney. Windows to the now internalised north wall have been bricked up.

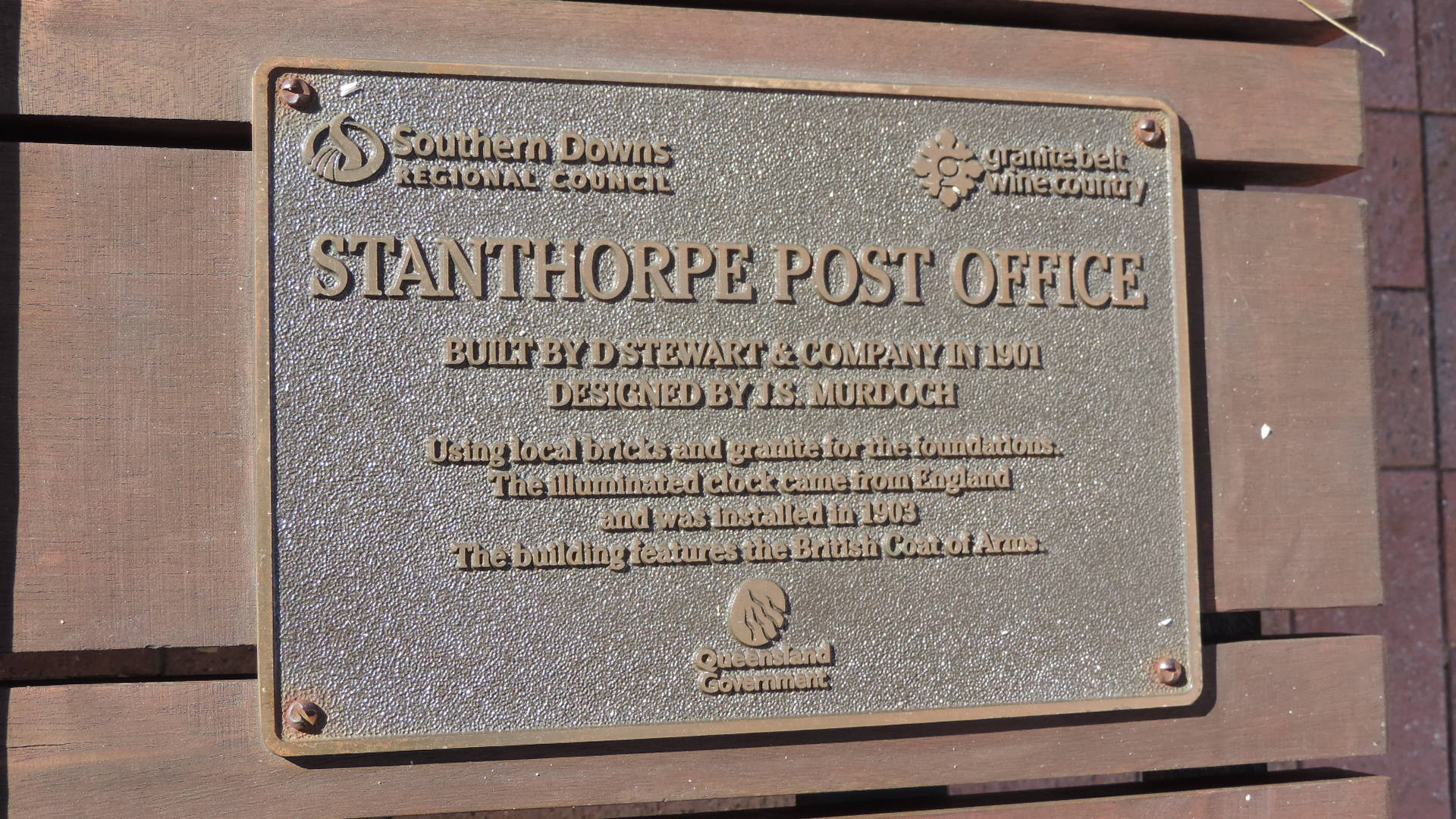
Information plaque, 2015

Within this space there is also an interview room enclosed by three-quarter height aluminium framed glazed partitions to the northwest corner. To the west, the original paired doors have been removed but the multipaned fanlight above has been retained, but over-painted. This now opens to a lunch room, male toilet facilities and stores. The storage areas to the southwest corner of the building – previously thought to have been a lavatory, constructed of brick – has a suspended ceiling form, as described previously. The lunch room is externally clad in weatherboards, and the interior walls are lined with fibrocement sheeting. The now enclosed west wall is of over-painted brick. The 1963 and later extension exhibits typical finishes and plan form of the era – the floors are of vinyl tile over concrete, walls of plasterboard and the ceilings are lined in plaster sheeting.

The building has a World War I memorial plaque and a modern plaque with brief information about the building.

=== Condition ===
As at 2008, the external intactness and integrity of the building was good. Internally, the spaces have been refurbished, but the interiors retain original fabric in terms of floors, walls, ceilings and joinery, etc., albeit overpainted.

== Heritage listing ==
The significant components of Stanthorpe Post Office include the main postal building of 1901. The northern wing, added in 1963 and extended in the late 1980s, weatherboard infill to the west elevation and the loading dock are not significant for the purpose of the heritage listing.

Stanthorpe Post Office was listed on the Australian Commonwealth Heritage List on 22 June 2004 having satisfied the following criteria.

Criterion A: Processes

The Stanthorpe Post Office is significant as the first post office in Queensland, and possibly Australia, to be built after the federation of the Australian colonies in January 1901. Designed in 1900 and completed in 1901 by Thomas Pye of the Queensland Public Works Office, it represents one of the many early contributions of the Queensland government to the fledgling Commonwealth. It follows an Australia-wide practice, in the sphere of communications, of state governments constructing postal and telegraph offices on behalf of the Commonwealth Postmaster General's Office, which was formally established in 1902. The Commonwealth did not have the resources, except in NSW and Victoria, to construct its own postal offices until the early 1920s. In terms of the local community, the Stanthorpe Post Office is also significant as a prominent public building and, as with most country areas, one of the first and most prominent manifestations of Commonwealth government presence in the town.

Criterion D: Characteristic values

Stanthorpe Post Office is an example of:

- a post office and telegraph office with quarters (second generation typology 1870–1929) with a clock tower is also present
- an informal Arts and Crafts treatment mixed with Edwardian Baroque Revival elements.
- the work of the Queensland Government Architect's Office attributed to JS Murdoch.

Typologically, Stanthorpe has a high measure of integrity to its original design, particularly external integrity.

Stylistically and architecturally, Stanthorpe forms an important group, coming just after Ipswich Post Office and before Mount Morgan Post Office in its application of Baroque Revival form and detailing to a post office. It is among the earliest Australian public buildings to be completed in a turn of the century Baroque manner, and, with Ipswich, counts as a prototype for the dominant mode in Australian public architecture until c.1918.

Criterion E: Aesthetic characteristics

The building, in the Informal Arts and Crafts style with an elaborate Royal coat of arms and a prominent four-storey clock tower, has a strong aesthetic impact on the Stanthorpe streetscape.
