= History of rifle clubs in Queensland =

Rifle clubs (also known as shooting clubs) have existed in Queensland, Australia, since 1861, making it the longest organised sport in Queensland.

== History ==
The Queensland Rifle Association (QRA) was formed on 15 May 1861, making it the oldest sporting club in Queensland. Its nearest rival, the Queensland Turf Club was formed in 1863 and the Queensland Cricket Association and Queensland Yacht Club two years later. From the beginning the Rifle Association had two separate and sometimes conflicting purposes. The first being to promote the sport of competitive shooting and the second being to improve shooting skills for military purposes. The Queensland Volunteer Force had been formed in 1860, shortly after Queensland came into separate existence in 1859. The Rifle Association was independent of the Volunteers but was formed largely to hone the marksmanship of the Volunteer forces. The relationship between the Queensland Rifle Association and the military continued for almost a century, being formally dissolved in 1960 when Australian Army funding for competition prizes and ammunition was withdrawn.

By the 1870s the Queensland Rifle Association had fallen on hard times. The Queensland Government was perilously short of funds and the lack of a foreign threat made the Volunteers a low priority for funding and consequently the funding for the Rifle Association also dried up. However things improved after 1877 when the Association expanded throughout southern Queensland. From 1884 civilian rifle clubs were allowed to affiliate with the QRA. In 1878 the QRA staged its first Queen’s competition modelled on the British National Rifle Association’s Queen’s Prize. The Queen’s or King’s Prize competition has been held every year apart from when it was suspended during World War I and World War II.

World War I saw a peak in rifle club membership in Queensland and some 5,316 members and ex-members of rifle clubs enlisted between 1914 and 1918. Rifle club membership expanded rapidly during the war from 9,578 in 1914 to more than 18,000 by 1917. One of the most celebrated marksmen to enlist was Trooper W. E. “Billy” Sing from the Proserpine Rifle Club. At Gallipoli Billy Sing was the deadliest sniper in the Australian forces with a tally of over 200.

Women were involved with the rifle clubs, often mainly in the social activities but small-bore "miniature rifle shooting" was seen as a sport women could readily participate in. In 1891 women participated for the first time in a competition at Tarampa using heavy rifles over 200 and 300 yard ranges; two of the younger women were described as "handling their rifles as steadily as the men, and they bid fair to make as good shots as their brothers". In 1901 the QRA held the first full-bore Ladies Matches in Australia. Lizzie Savage was the winner of Ladies Matches in 1901, 1902 and 1903. Lizzie Savage was also the first female member of the Queensland Rifle Association.
