= Woolloongabba Post Office =

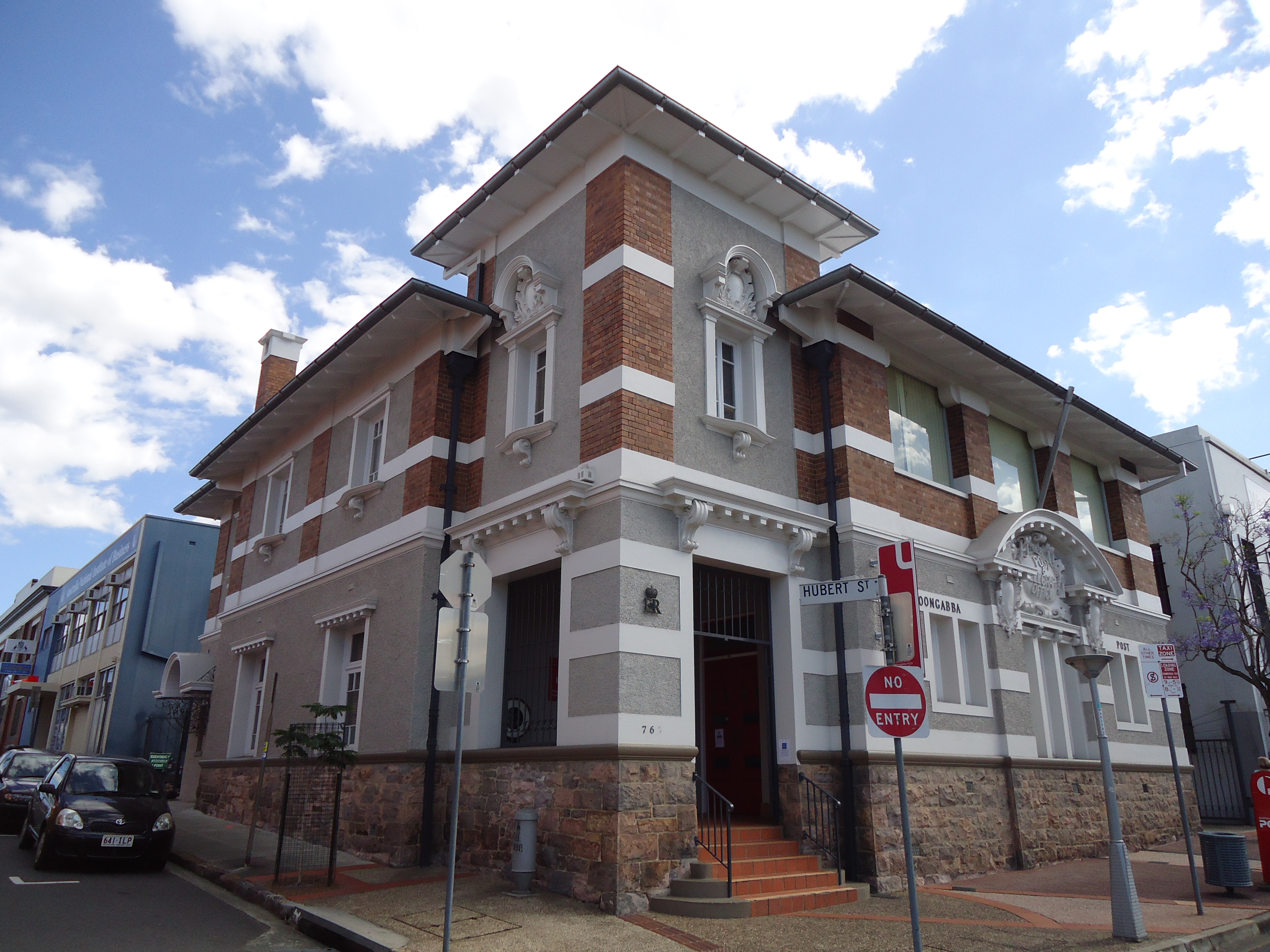
- former Woolloongabba Post Office, 2011

- Location within Queensland Location within Australia
- 27.4865°S 153.0341°E
- Location: 765 Stanley Street, Woolloongabba, City of Brisbane, Queensland, Australia

History
- Design period: 1900–1914 (early 20th century)
- Built: 1905

Site notes
- Architect: Thomas Pye

Queensland Heritage Register
- Official name: Woolloongaba Post Office (former), Woolloongabba Post Office, Woolloongabba Post and Telegraph Office
- Type: state heritage (built)
- Designated: 24 January 2003
- Reference no.: 600357
- Significant period: 1905 (fabric)
- Significant components: post & telegraph office, residential accommodation – post master's house/quarters
- Builders: Thomas Rees

Woolloongaba Post Office is a heritage-listed former post office at 765 Stanley Street, Woolloongabba, City of Brisbane, Queensland, Australia. It was designed by Thomas Pye and built in 1905 by Thomas Rees. It is also known as Woolloongabba Post & Telegraph Office. It was added to the Queensland Heritage Register on 24 January 2003.

== History ==
The Woolloongabba Post & Telegraph Office was constructed in 1905 for the Commonwealth Department of Home Affairs, to a plan designed and supervised by the Queensland Government Architect in the Queensland Department of Public Works.

It replaced an earlier Woolloongabba Post & Telegraph Office, opened in rented premises in Logan Road, in 1887. The population of Woolloongabba, which had grown steadily between the 1860s and 1880s, increased rapidly following the expansion of the railway line to Woolloongabba in 1884, and the extension of the electric tramway to Woolloongabba/East Brisbane in 1897. During the 1880s and 1890s the 'Gabba developed as Brisbane's fourth major shopping centre, the others being Brisbane CBD, Fortitude Valley and Stanley Street at South Brisbane. By the turn of the century, most of the allotments facing Stanley Street, Logan Road and Ipswich Road at the Woolloongabba Fiveways were fully developed commercial sites.

Following the separation of Queensland from New South Wales in 1859 and prior to Federation of Australia in 1901, the Queensland Government organised the postal service for the state. In 1901 the newly established Commonwealth Government became responsible for communications, and the Commonwealth Postmaster-General's Department was created. The transfer of responsibilities from the States to the Commonwealth was gradual, and the Queensland Department of Works continued to carry out design and documentation of post offices on behalf of the Commonwealth Government until c. 1920.

Alfred Barton Brady was employed with the Queensland Government as Government Architect from 1892 to 1922. Brady claimed that he always advised on arrangement, style and materials, but it appears that his Senior Assistant, Thomas Pye supervised much of the detailed design. During the 30 years they worked together in the department, Brady and Pye assembled a talented group of architects and draftsmen who were considered the equal of any in Australia, including from 1893 to 1903 John Smith Murdoch, who was to become Commonwealth Director-General of Works in 1927. Pye later served as deputy government architect from 1906 to 1921, and a major example of his work is the former Executive Building (now known as the Land Administration Building) in William Street. From the office of the Government Architect there developed a tradition of fine government buildings, including many post offices, customs houses and court houses throughout the State.

A new post office building was proposed as early as 1901, and approval was given in August 1902 to purchase the present site for £1,250. The site was previously owned by the Wesleyan Methodist Church, and provided the Commonwealth with the opportunity to acquire a site for the post office that was on one of the three major streets which formed the Fiveways and was within close proximity of the centre of local activity, the Wooloongabba Branch railway line and the tramway.

In October 1903 the Commonwealth requested the Queensland Department of Public Works to prepare sketch plans for the building and to survey the site.

Working plans for the building were completed in 1904, under Pye's supervision.

The design accommodated a large mail room on the ground floor and residential accommodation for the postmaster on the first. This comprised dining and sitting rooms, four bedrooms, kitchen, bathroom, scullery, store, rear verandah and front piazza. The latter was a concession to the climate which was unusual in commercial buildings of the time. Provision was made for a ground floor extension along the northwestern side.

Tenders were called in February–March 1905, and the contract was let to builder Thomas Rees with a price of £2,174.

Completed in November 1905, the Woolloongabba Post & Telegraph Office was one of only five masonry post offices constructed in Queensland between 1900 and 1910. In addition to Woolloongabba, these included post offices at Ipswich (1900), Stanthorpe (1901), Cairns (1906, no longer extant) and Mount Morgan (1910).

The ground floor of the building has undergone several alterations, as the spaces were re-organised to suit the changing functions of the post office. The first floor ceased to function as a residence during the 1950s, and was converted for use by the staff and the district inspector. During the 1960s the first floor was further altered to include a mail room, and most of the remaining partitions were removed. The building was refurbished in 1988, and from 1989 the first floor was leased to the Genealogical Society of Queensland.

The building closed as a post office in 1994, although some offices remain in use by Australia Post.

== Description ==
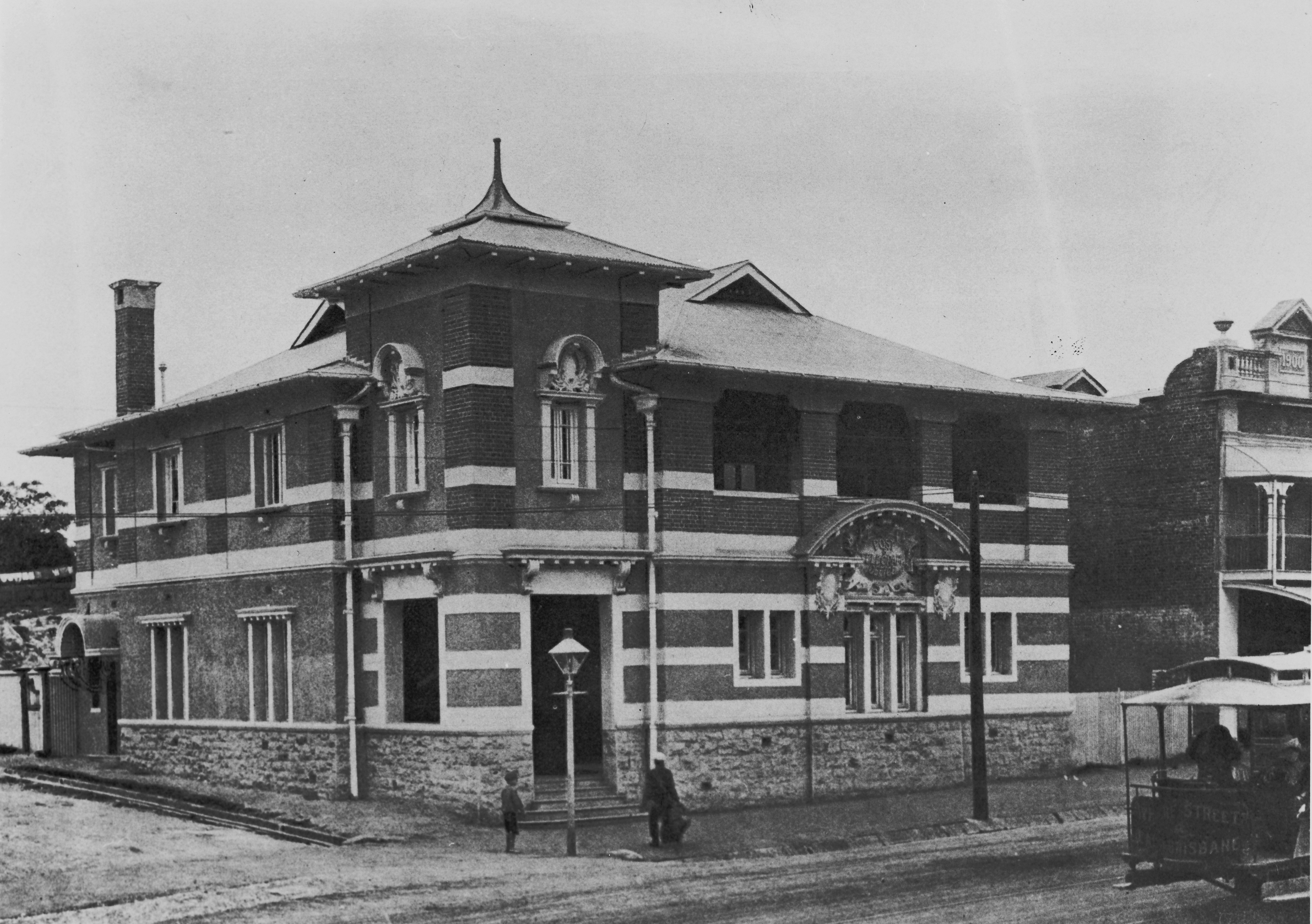
Woolloongabba Post Office, circa 1906

The former Woolloongabba Post Office is a two-storeyed rendered masonry building with cement dressings and hipped corrugated iron roofs, located on the corner of Stanley and Hubert Streets. It is richly decorated, and makes a prominent contribution through form, scale and detail to the predominantly parapeted commercial streetscape of Stanley St.

Originally constructed to accommodate a post and telegraph office on the ground floor, and a residence on the first floor, the form and detail of the exterior of the building is skilfully designed to articulate the domestic and public roles of the building. The post office is composed as a single major volume under a hipped roof with ventilated gables, with an attached tower over the entrance vestibule at the corner of Hubert and Stanley Sts. On the north elevation, facing Stanley St, the residence sits behind a "piazza" or loggia. Towards the rear facing Hubert St, the building, assumes a more domestic character, with a prominent and richly detailed awning, a separate, smaller hipped roof, and a chimney which rises above the roof line. The southern (rear) frontage has a deep timber verandah, and the western frontage overlooking the service lane is unrendered and undecorated. The building has deep eaves with shaped rafter ends.

The two street-facing elevations have horizontal tripartite ornamentation, comprising: a square-snecked rubble stone plinth; cement string course to ground floor sill level; coarse aggregate rendered walls to the piano nobile; and unrendered brickwork expressed as pilasters above a first floor string course. These elevations are linked with cement banding. The corner tower has large openings at the base with deep lintels with dentils and scrolls. The single windows above have pilasters and single scrolled brackets under the sill, and are surmounted by deep arched hood mouldings with cartouches. The tower roof is topped with an idiosyncratic concave peak and finial. The Stanley St frontage has paired windows to the ground floor either side of a set of three windows surmounted by the central feature of the elevation; an arch with dentils over small cartouches around a large, elaborate cartouche bearing the words POST & TELEGRAPH OFFICE. The more recently added metal WOOLLOONGABBA POST OFFICE, also appears on the Stanley St elevation. The loggia above has brick spandrels and columns with rounded cement capitals.

The openings to the Hubert St elevations have dentils to the ground floor, and single scrolled brackets and sills to the first floor. The main entrance to the former residence on Hubert St comprises a timber-lined barrel vault supported on delicate metal brackets, over a central door with a coloured glass arched fanlight flanked by single windows. A second entrance is provided around the corner on the south elevation, which also has an arched coloured glass fanlight and an arched brick lintel.

The verandah to the south, now partially enclosed, has a timber balustrade with timber posts, and timber battens to the verandah soffit. The brickwork to the south is unrendered, revealing splayed brick lintels.

Internally, the former residence is accessed via a set of timber stairs in the south eastern corner of the building. The stairs have turned balusters and substantial newel posts with chamfered rectangular tops. On the first floor, the former residence partition walls have been removed, however the remaining large space retains its timber lined ceilings, a single fretwork ceiling ventilator panel, a former kitchen fireplace, and a fireplace in the south eastern corner with fine timber panelling and ceramic tiled surrounds. Some of the decorative ironmongery remains, including wall ventilator panels, escutcheon plates, and a teardrop-shaped door handle at the ground floor entrance.

The ground floor has also undergone substantial alterations with the installation of new partitions for offices and new ceilings, but retains a central cast-iron column and panelled beams traversing the former large mail room. The column has an identification plate at its base which reads HARVEY Margaret St Brisbane.

== Heritage listing ==
Woolloongaba Post Office (former) was listed on the Queensland Heritage Register on 24 January 2003 having satisfied the following criteria.

The place is important in demonstrating the evolution or pattern of Queensland's history.

The former Woolloongabba Post Office survives as evidence of the rapid growth of Woolloongabba which accompanied the expansion of public transport in Brisbane around the turn of the century. Both the population boom and the substantial masonry post office building at Woolloongabba are illustrative of the late 1890s/early 1900s economic high on which Queensland entered the 20th century.

The place demonstrates rare, uncommon or endangered aspects of Queensland's cultural heritage.

The former Woolloongabba Post Office is one of few extant substantial masonry post office buildings erected in Queensland during the early 20th century.

The place is important in demonstrating the principal characteristics of a particular class of cultural places.

The form and detail of the exterior of the building is skilfully designed to articulate the domestic and public roles of the building. The former post office illustrates competency in design and workmanship, and reflects the high standard of Government buildings in Queensland, designed by the Department of Public Works during the early 20th century. When erected, the building was unusual for its incorporation of a piazza in a commercial building.

The place is important because of its aesthetic significance.

The former post office, located within the predominantly commercial Stanley Street streetscape, displays fine quality public architecture with a strong civic presence.

The place has a special association with the life or work of a particular person, group or organisation of importance in Queensland's history.

The former post office illustrates competency in design and workmanship, and reflects the high standard of Government buildings in Queensland, designed by the Department of Public Works during the early 20th century.
