= Commonwealth Heritage List in Queensland =

List of Queensland Commonwealth Heritage locations

This is a list of places on the Commonwealth Heritage List in Queensland. The Commonwealth Heritage List is a heritage register which lists places of historic, cultural and natural heritage on Commonwealth land or in Commonwealth waters, or owned or managed by the Commonwealth Government. To be listed, a place has to meet one or more of the nine Commonwealth Heritage List criteria.

== Currently listed places ==
As of 7 January 2025, there are 30 places in Queensland listed on the Commonwealth Heritage List :

Place name	Class	Listed	Address	Suburb or town	Coordinates	Photo
ABC Radio Studios	Historic	14 September 2009	236 Quay Street	Rockhampton	23.3801°S 150.5157°E	
Ayr Post Office	Historic	22 August 2012	155 Queen Street	Ayr	19.5762°S 147.4047°E	
Boonah Post Office	Historic	8 November 2011	1 Park Street	Boonah	27.9975°S 152.6819°E	
Bowen Post Office	Historic	8 November 2011	46 Herbert Street	Bowen	20.0122°S 148.2468°E	
Bundaberg Post Office	Historic	8 November 2011	155a Bourbong Street	Bundaberg	24.8659°S 152.3484°E	
Charters Towers Post Office	Historic	8 November 2011	17 Gill Street	Charters Towers	20.0758°S 146.2580°E	
Cooroy Post Office	Historic	22 August 2012	33 Maple Street	Cooroy	26.4184°S 152.9104°E	
Dent Island Light	Historic	22 June 2004	Dent Island	Whitsundays	20.3693°S 148.9290°E	
Enoggera Magazine Complex	Historic	22 June 2004	Gallipoli Barracks, Inwood Road	Enoggera	27.4341°S 152.9779°E	
General Post Office, Brisbane	Historic	22 June 2004	261-285 Queen Street	Brisbane City	27.4681°S 153.0282°E	
Goods Island Light	Historic	22 June 2004	Goods Island	Torres Strait	10.5651°S 142.1523°E	
Green Hill Fort	Historic	28 May 2008	Chester Street	Thursday Island	10.5840°S 142.2110°E	
Greenbank Military Range	Natural	22 June 2004	Middle Road	Greenbank	27.6707°S 152.9659°E	
Ingham Post Office	Historic	22 August 2012	15 Lannercost Street	Ingham	18.6509°S 146.1551°E	
Lady Elliot Island Light	Historic	22 June 2004	Lady Elliot Island	Coral Sea	24.1148°S 152.7119°E	
Land Warfare Centre	Natural	22 June 2004	Tamborine Mountain Road	Canungra	28.0291°S 153.2114°E	
Low Isles Light	Historic	28 May 2008	Low Island	Low Isles	16.3842°S 145.5599°E	
Macrossan Stores Depot Group	Historic	22 June 2004	Flinders Highway	Macrossan	20.0083°S 146.4882°E	
Maryborough Post Office	Historic	8 November 2011	227 Bazaar Street	Maryborough	25.5375°S 152.7045°E	
North Reef Light	Historic	22 June 2004	North Reef Island, off Rockhampton	Coral Sea	23.1851°S 151.9031°E	
RAAF Base Amberley heritage structures	Historic	22 June 2004	Southern Amberley Road	Amberley	27.6394°S 152.7072°E	
Remount Complex	Historic	22 June 2004	Wynter Road	Enoggera	27.4296°S 152.9831°E	
School of Musketry	Historic	22 June 2004	Gallipoli Barracks, 431 Lloyd Street	Enoggera	27.4244°S 152.9859°E	
Shoalwater Bay Military Training Area	Natural	22 June 2004	Byfield Road	Byfield	22.5479°S 150.4873°E	
Small Arms Magazine	Historic	22 June 2004	Gallipoli Barracks, Murray Avenue	Enoggera	27.4247°S 152.9848°E	
Stanthorpe Post Office	Historic	22 June 2004	14 Maryland Street	Stanthorpe	28.6556°S 151.9337°E	
Tully Training Area	Natural	22 June 2004	Tully-Cardstone Road	Tully	17.8413°S 145.8053°E	
Victoria Barracks	Historic	14 September 2009	83 - 129 Petrie Terrace	Petrie Terrace	27.4647°S 153.0147°E	
Warwick Post Office	Historic	8 November 2011	98 Palmerin Street	Warwick	28.2165°S 152.0330°E	
Wide Bay Military Reserve	Natural	22 June 2004	Tin Can Bay Road	Tin Can Bay	25.8733°S 152.9348°E	

== Formerly listed places ==
As of 7 January 2025, there are two places in Queensland formerly on the Commonwealth Heritage List:

Place name	Class	Address	Suburb or town	Coordinates	Photo
Kissing Point Fortification	Historic	44 Howitt Street	North Ward	19.2399°S 146.8043°E	
Naval Offices	Historic	3 Edward Street	Brisbane City	27.4719°S 153.0307°E	
