= Bowen Post Office =

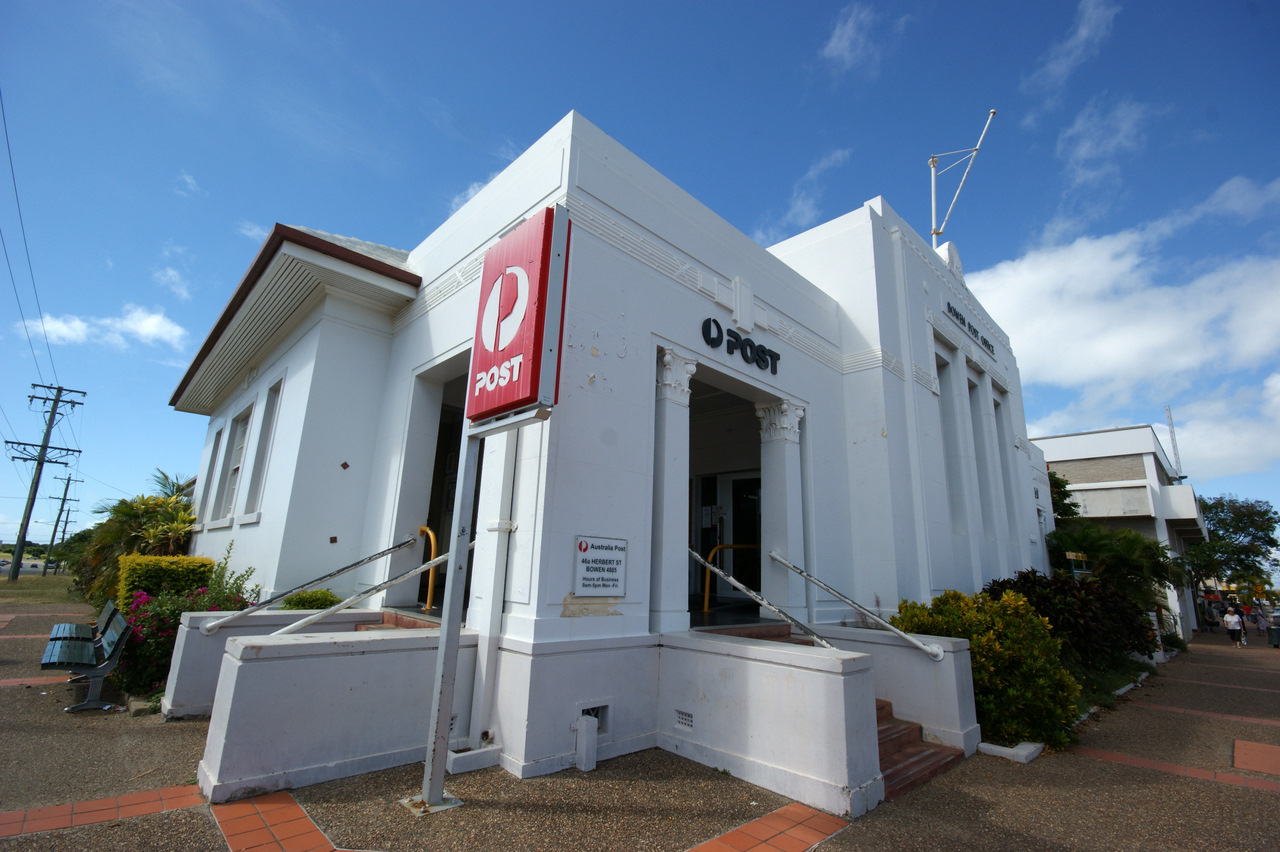
- Bowen Post Office, 2009

- Location within Queensland
- 20.0122°S 148.2468°E
- Location: 46 Herbert Street, Bowen, Queensland, Australia

History
- Built: 1936
- Built for: Postmaster General of Australia

Site notes
- Architect: Commonwealth Department of Interior
- Owner: Australia Post

Commonwealth Heritage List
- Official name: Bowen Post Office
- Type: Listed place (Historic)
- Designated: 8 November 2011
- Reference no.: 106124

Bowen Post Office is a heritage-listed post office at 46 Herbert Street, Bowen, Queensland, Australia. It was designed by the Commonwealth Department of the Interior and constructed in 1936. It was added to the Australian Commonwealth Heritage List on 8 November 2011.

== History ==
Bowen, near Port Denison in North Queensland, is halfway between Townsville and Mackay, approximately 1,130 kilometres by road from Brisbane. It is the region's oldest town, founded on the same day that the American Civil War began on 12 April 1861. George Dalrymple named the town after Sir George Bowen, the first Governor of Queensland. Port Denison was declared an official port of entry in the same year, and not long afterwards, the construction of a large timber jetty commenced in 1865.

In 1869, the telegraph line from Bowen to Townsville was opened and following improvements to the port, including the completion of the jetty and the dredging of the harbour, shipping and handling of local produce, cargo, mail and passengers secured the primacy of the town in the region. By 1910, a tramway connected Proserpine with Bowen, permitting sugar from the Proserpine Sugar Mill to be shipped from Port Denison. The opening of the Bowen-Townsville railway line followed in 1913.

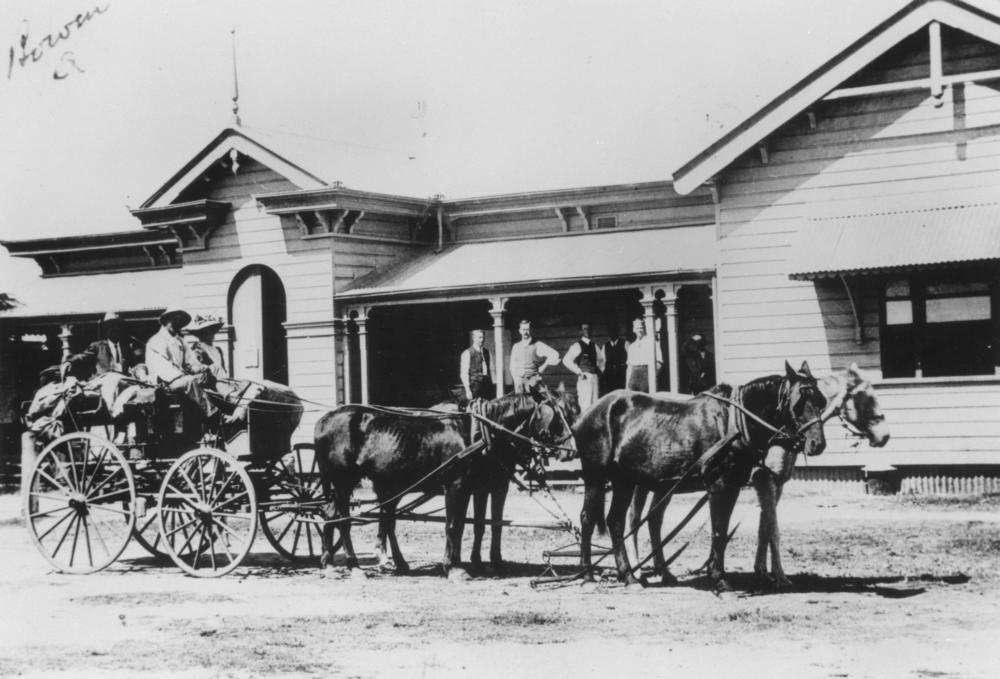
Former Bowen Post Office, 1908

The town's main thoroughfare is Herbert Street, which leads down to the port. It is a wide avenue with a central landscaped median strip and a prominent war memorial terminating the east axis. Bowen Post Office, constructed in 1936, is located on the southeast intersection with Powell Street. It replaced an earlier post office on Dalrymple Street. Several other municipal buildings nearby include the Bowen Shire Chambers (c.1920s), the memorial club directly opposite, and the Bowen courthouse, police and ambulance station.

Since completion, a service wing has been added to the rear of the post office fronting Powell Street; a double storey redbrick exchange building is constructed on the north site boundary. To the east, with a shared right-of-way, a two-storey Telstra building has been built with a large steel-framed telecommunications tower in the rear yard.

The building was designed by the Commonwealth Department of Interior under the control of architect Horace Mackennal.

== Description ==
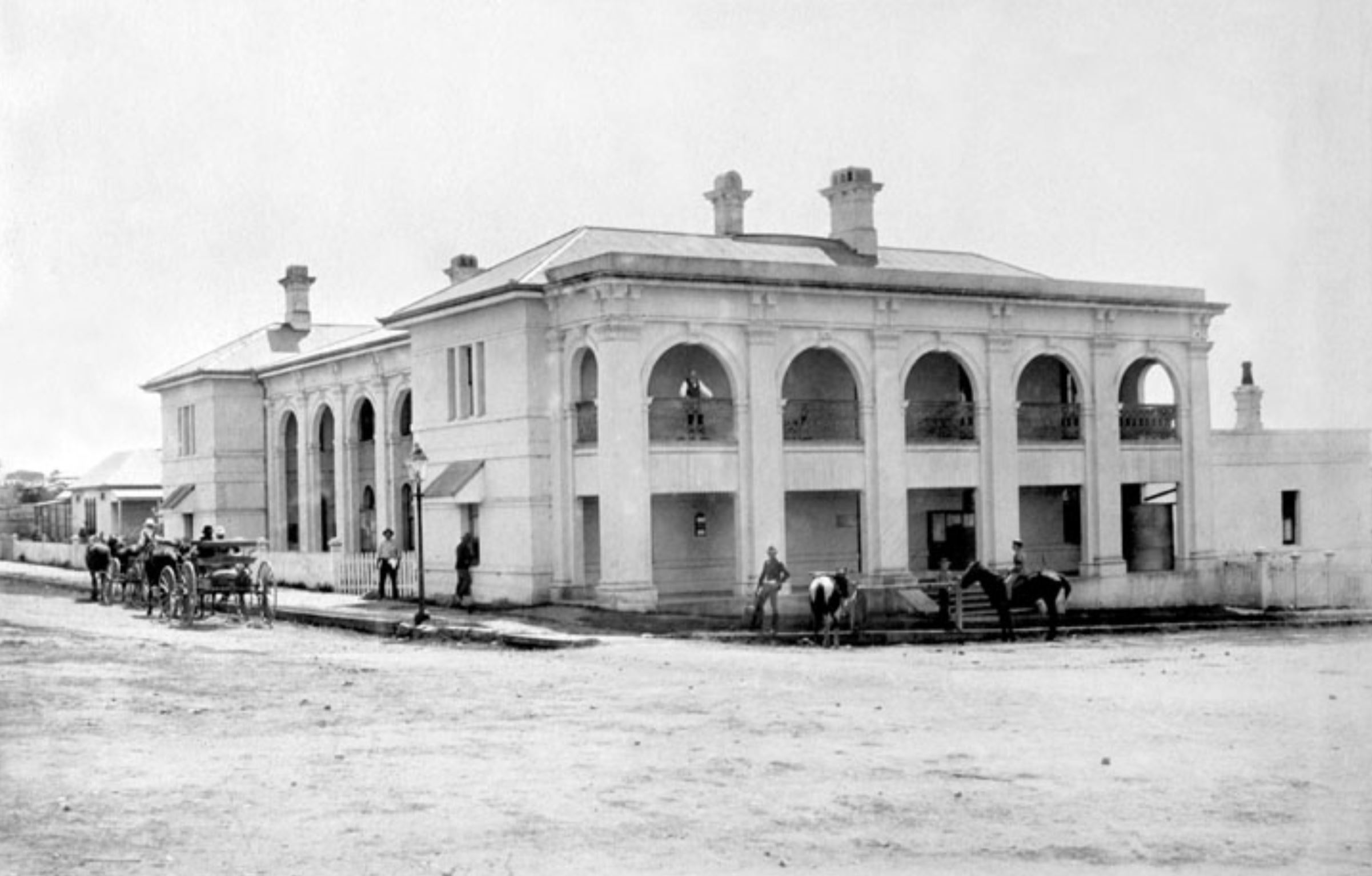
Bowen Post Office, circa 1890

Bowen Post Office is at 46 Herbert Street, corner Powell Street, Bowen, comprising the whole of Lot 3 RP742488.

Bowen Post Office is located at the corner of Herbert and Powell Streets at the top of the main thoroughfare through town, which falls gradually down to the port. Nearby civic buildings include the courthouse and police station, and the council chambers directly opposite. Herbert Street is a wide boulevard with a landscaped median strip containing the Bowen War Memorial. The corner site is rectangular and is flanked by a two-storey red brickwork exchange on the north side fronting Powell Street. A concrete side driveway on the east side of the post office provides service delivery access and carparking to the rear of the site. Directly north of this is a two-storey Telstra building which has a large telecommunications tower at the rear.

Built in 1936, Bowen Post Office presents a smooth rendered frontage to Herbert Street, which broadly follows the symmetrical fronted twin-entry post offices common in Queensland after the 1910s but translated in a cubic parapeted form. The frontage comprises two corner entry porches with parapets on both sides, and a central breakfront between them. Formerly this contained the telephone booths and public counter area and was lit by large a triple window below a higher parapet. The Art Deco styling is concentrated across the Herbert Street elevation, which is decorated with a stringcourse running across the central breakfront and a stepped-back moulding just below the parapet ridges. In the central bay, the linking course line jumps up over the ripple window and encloses it. Sculpted ornamentation of the flat fronted walls comes from a number of elements: two bosses; another course just below the parapet; stepping in the parapet itself; and a semicircular moulding, like the central acroterion finial on early Greek temples. The corner porches also include columns with stylised capitals and keystones over the openings and a moulded cornice which is highlighted by a cross and dart motif.

The rear and side elevations of the building present as smooth stucco walls with moulded cornices and windows with raised cement surrounds and projecting sills. They are breakfronted with hipped roofs and gap-planked boxed eaves and recall the Georgian Revival design of Ayr Post Office completed in the same year and in the same general region.

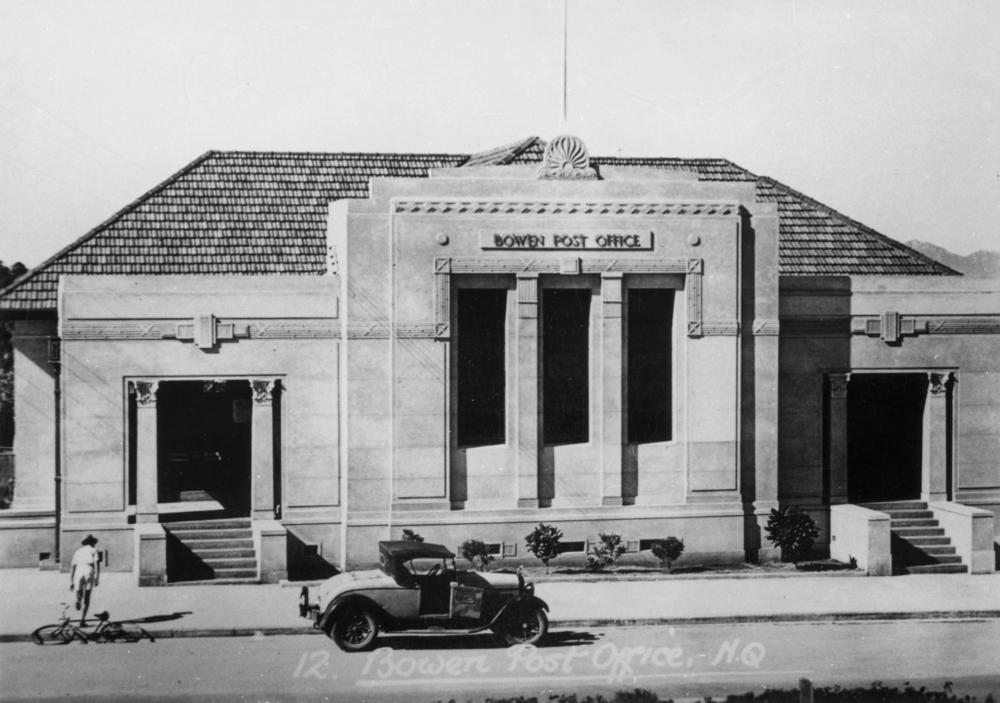
Herbert Street frontage, 1939

In plan form, the central retail shop is entered from either corner side porch. The west porch also accesses the post office box lobby, which has subsequently been installed within the west end of the former mailroom, involving the enlargement of an original window (in the north wall) to form a door opening. The interior has three main sections which relate to the following grouping of functions: the retail shop counter, mail sorting room and post office box lobby; staff amenities, contractors' rooms and storage areas (northeast corner); and service delivery and loading bay (addition to the northwest corner). The basement level extends under the rear northeast corner and is used for storage purposes.

The building is a single storey with a basement level at the rear (north) and comprises:

- Structural frame: Loadbearing masonry construction with timber floor and roof framing. Brick piers and walls at basement level generally support the ground floor with the northeast section of the building (formerly associated with the telegraph facility) using reinforced concrete slab and beam construction.
- External walls: Stucco rendered brickwork decorated with a moulded string line and cornice encircling the building. Window openings have raised cement surrounds and projecting sills. The corner portico columns have stylised capitals and keystones, and a moulded cornice. The sub floor metal grates have a diamond pattern and perimeter windows generally have double hung sashes which are subdivided by glazing bars into chequerboard and diamond patterns.
- Internal walls: Generally hard rendered walls with V-dado marking, timber curtain rails and plaster cornices. Door openings have moulded architraves.
- Floor: Generally, timber boards (subsequently covered with carpet and vinyl) with moulded timber skirting. The northeast section of concrete floor is covered with vinyl tiles.
- Ceiling: Fibrous plaster ceilings with gridded vents and moulded cornices (generally replaced or concealed with new plasterboard sheet). The corner porch ceilings are strapped plaster with moulded cornices.
- Roof: Timber-framed hipped roof lined with terracotta roof tiles. Eaves are timber-slatted. Rainwater goods comprise square box gutters with decorative rainwater heads and connection plates.
- Front building inscription "BOWEN POST OFFICE" surmounted by central pediment and flagpole.
- Decorative moulds either side of opening over original counter.

=== Condition ===
The original planning of Bowen Post Office comprised a symmetrically composed twin porch with a central breakfronted and pedimented postal hall. The planning arrangement provided dual but independent operation of the postal and telegraphic functions around the central postal hall. The front public area contained four corner telephone booths and a counter, with a large mailroom beyond defined (externally) by the main transverse roof ridge. The rear northwest corner accommodated the telegraph functions with an off-form concrete floor slab over the basement area.

Generally, the majority of original internal walls remain, although the installation full and ¾ height walls have subdivided most of the principal rooms into smaller areas. This includes the former mailroom which has three main sections: post office box lobby (west), retail shop and counter (centre) and interview rooms (east). A new mailroom and loading bay area has been added to the building (northwest corner), aligned to the original rear verandah which retains its original raked ceiling. The rooms associated with the original telegraph facility (northeast corner) have also been subdivided, although the timber framed and glazed partitions remain intact.

Notwithstanding the changed pattern of circulation and use, the external presentation of the building is able to demonstrate key aspects of the original design, particularly the parapeted frontage, hipped roof form, smooth rendered wall finishes and stylised mouldings. The main alteration is associated with addition of the mailroom and loading dock which fronts Powell Street and has involved the extension of the original roof line and is indistinguishable as new work. Elsewhere, changes include the addition of the disabled ramp to east porch and steel-framed awnings over the walkways at the rear of the building. Internally, much of the original fabric and detailing are intact, although largely concealed by new finishes.

Despite changes to its pattern of circulation and use, and while altered, Bowen Post Office maintains a reasonable ability to demonstrate its original design and manner of construction, and this is most evident externally with the building's street frontages. Externally and internally the building is in relatively sound condition.

== Heritage listing ==
Bowen Post Office was listed on the Australian Commonwealth Heritage List on 8 November 2011 having satisfied the following criteria.

Criterion A: Processes

Bowen Post Office, constructed in 1936, is one of many small single-storey post offices designed built throughout Queensland in the interwar period to service its towns and regional centres. The building has clear associations with the regional development of southern Mackay. These aspects of the building's history are of local significance. The significant components of Bowen Post Office include the main postal building constructed in 1936.

Criterion B: Rarity

While the application of Art Deco detail to the Bowen Post office is concentrated along the Herbert Street parapeted frontage, is restrained to three-dimensional massing and symmetry with stylised low-relief decoration, and is conservative in design terms, the application is comparatively rare in terms of the post offices surveyed. The stylistic treatment includes the moulded columns, capitals, keystones and string lines in low relief on smooth rendered walls.

Criterion D: Characteristic values

Bowen Post Office is an example of:

- a retail post office typology (third generation 1930–1974)
- an Interwar architecture c. 1915–1942 (Neo-Georgian Revival with Art Deco flourish)
- a work of the Commonwealth Department of the Interior under Horace Mackennal

Typologically, Bowen Post Office, built in 1936, is an example of a third generation retail post office. This generation demonstrate an emergent retail function in postal operations, separation of the telephone exchange area and increased requirements for larger post office box lobby areas with independent access and serviced by a frontally positioned mail sorting room and/or a rear loading yard. These aspects are evident in the original design to the extent that symmetrical porch entries were placed either side of a central postal hall, allowing the telegraph and postal services to operate independently. Subsequently, the internal subdivision of the mailroom has facilitated the enlargement of the retail function and installation of the post office box lobby, and a new mailroom added to the northwest corner of the building. The former telegraph and telephone facilities have been removed and the areas refurbished for other uses.

In the state context, and with regard to post offices still owned and operated by Australia Post, Bowen Post Office is one of three "Type M6 1930s Twin Porch" built in the period 1935–38 with similar planning arrangements and municipal siting, the others being Ayr Post Office (1936) and Ingham Post Office (1935). The type is defined as following the basic layout and form of 1920s and 1940–50s post offices, are domestic in scale, and are physically associated with townscape civic gestures or elements such as war memorials.

Architecturally, the basic configuration comprises a symmetrical expanded porch in the manner of many 1920s and 1930s Queensland post offices, but translated here as cuboid pavilions. The primary distinguishing feature of Bowen Post Office is its Art Deco styling, which is concentrated along the Herbert Street parapeted frontage, and is albeit restrained and conservative.

Criterion E: Aesthetic characteristics

Bowen Post Office is a domestically scaled building which a degree of municipal and landmark qualities. This is principally due to its parapeted building frontage to Herbert Street and its physical proximity to other civic buildings including the Shire Council Chambers, police station, ambulance station and courthouse, as well as their collective frontages to Herbert Street, the town's main street.

Criterion G: Social value

Built in 1936, and replacing the original post office on another site, Bowen Post Office is of social value due to the continuity of postal services which have operated from the place for over seventy years.
