= Ingham Post Office =

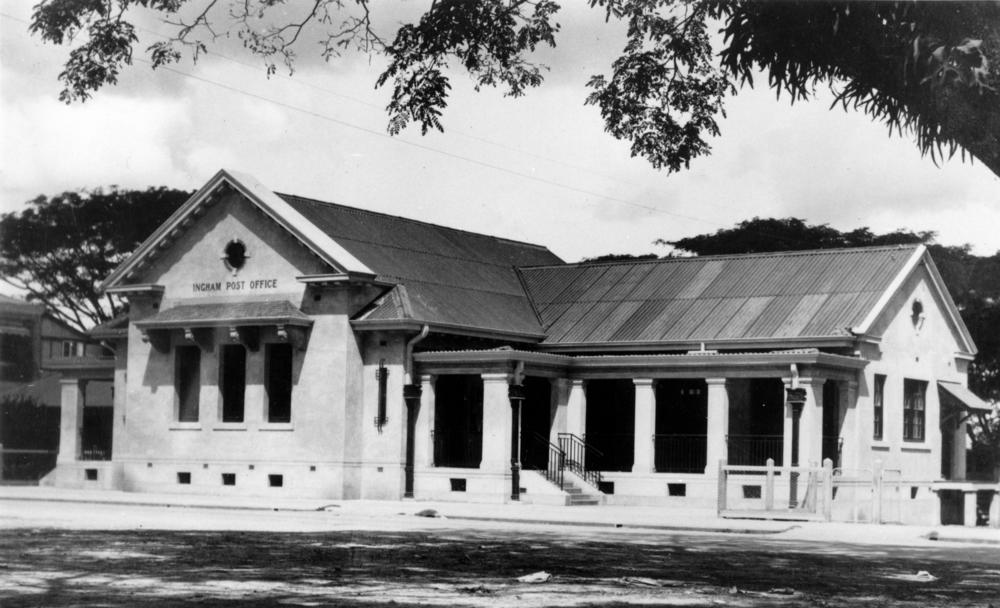
- Ingham Post Office, circa 1935

- Location within Queensland
- 18.6509°S 146.1551°E
- Location: 15 Lannercost Street, Ingham, Shire of Hinchinbrook, Queensland, Australia

History
- Built: 1935

Commonwealth Heritage List
- Official name: Ingham Post Office
- Type: Listed place (Historic)
- Designated: 22 August 2012
- Reference no.: 106200

Ingham Post Office is a heritage-listed post office at 15 Lannercost Street, Ingham, Shire of Hinchinbrook, Queensland, Australia. It was built in 1935. It was added to the Australian Commonwealth Heritage List on 22 August 2012.

== History ==
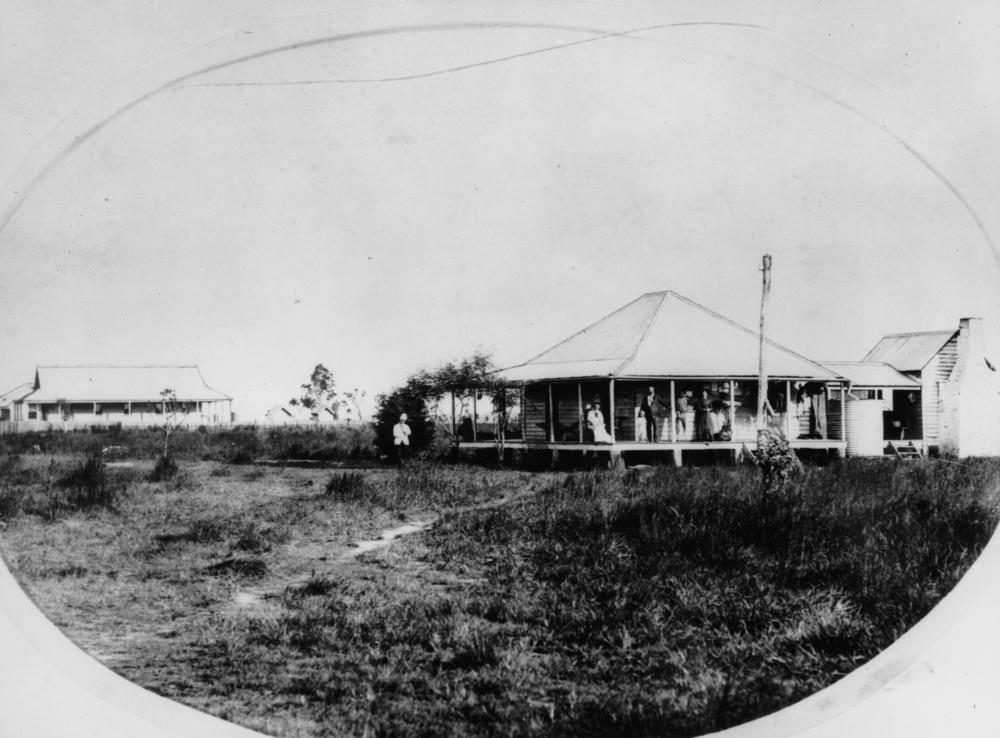
Ingham's first post office, circa 1880

Ingham is located on the Bruce Highway approximately 116 km north of Townsville. It is within the Herbert River region which was explored in February 1864 by George Dalrymple and Arthur Scott, with the first settlers arriving in 1869 to take up sugar, cotton and coffee growing. Postal services were established there in 1871, with the first post office and residence being constructed in 1875.

Two mail routes were operating in 1873 – the steamer mail run from Cardwell and a fortnightly mail service by horse between Townsville and Ingham, a distance of 95 miles (150 km). As settlers moved into the area and plantations developed, a post office site was established on a 624-acre reserve. The building was erected in 1875, run by postmistress Mrs Collins, at a salary of £12 per annum. Mail was transported overland from the river steamer over a distance of four miles (6.5 km).

In 1879, the postmaster became responsible for the telegraph station. The township of Lower Herbert was officially named Ingham in 1882 and the telegraph line was extended to the coast at Dungeness in November 1883. After this mail, telegraph and telephone services developed. By 1908, a trunk line telephone exchange was established, followed by the installation of a magneto type manual exchange. By 1910, eight sugar plantations and six mills had been established in the Ingham area, with the Colonial Sugar Refining Company (CSR) prominent. By 1931, the population of the Hinchinbrook Shire was approximately 8500, and the sugar industry was still expanding.

Around this time, in 1935, the current post office was built on the site of the previous timber building, and it is possible that a section of the earlier 1870s structure remains at the rear of the existing building, but this has not been confirmed. After World War II, the area's sugar cane industry underwent another two expansionist phases, first between 1951 and 1953 and later after 1963. During this time (in 1957) it appears that a new wing and L-shaped verandah was added to the east side of the 1930s post office building.

== Description ==
Ingham Post Office is at 15 Lannercost Street, Ingham, near the intersection with the Bruce Highway, the main thoroughfare through town. It comprised the whole of Lot 1 RP735048.

The building is freestanding with a landscaped street frontage, and flanked on the east by a five-level redbrick office-bank building and on the west by the smaller Commonwealth Bank. The site is flat and incorporates a large bitumen area at the rear for carparking. A steel-framed telecommunications tower is in the south-west corner behind the exchange building which faces the highway. A gravel driveway along the post office's west boundary provides access to a loading dock built at the rear of the building. Buildings in the general vicinity are disparate in form, age and size, although the post office shares a civic precinct with the Hinchinbrook Shire Chambers and Library nearby. It also fronts a landscaped median strip, running the length of Lannercost Street and incorporates plants, recreational furniture and the town's war memorial clock.

Ingham Post Office is asymmetrical in plan form but comprises twin corner porches which flank a main front gable. The roof is lined with galvanised corrugated iron, the main ridge parallel to the street, and a central wing projecting forward at right angles. The side wings are drawn out into five and four bays length on the east and west sides respectively with the former, which is not original and constructed after 1957, set at a higher pitch. The verandah colonnade is given a solid treatment set out by square set columns with vaguely "Tuscan" capitals which support a much lighter fascia below the low pitched roof. A metal balustrade runs between the columns, and down over the concrete entry steps either side of the central wing. The post office's dual entry is emphasised by two small enclosures projecting either side of the central breakfront, each containing a slit window. The main window front is stepped forward on a rendered base with three central windows separated by four large brackets with volutes, which hold up the formerly shingled sunhood. Over this, the dentilled broken pediment is just as weighty and reinforces the general air of eighteenth-century Colonial Revival expression. The rear of the building is clad with timber weatherboards and where various steel-framed service additions have been added. Elsewhere around the building perimeter, timber steps, balustrades, louvred sunscreens and a disabled ramp have been added.

Entry to the central retail shop is via the original side porches and steps. Directly beyond this, running in an east–west direction is a double loaded corridor, with access to administrative and staff areas on the west including an interview room, office, store rooms, lunchroom, plant and male toilets. To the south, a centrally-positioned passage leads down a few steps to the female toilets, contractors' room and lockers. This section of the building, constructed in reverse hardwood frame has vertical board linings and ceilings and panelled doors, and may correspond to the original 1875 post office. The entire east wing and verandah appears to be an addition built after 1957 and comprises the open mail sorting room and post office box wall; further south, the construction of the service area and loading dock has internalised the former weatherboard exterior.

Key elements of the building include:

- free standing form
- original composition of a central breakfront gable to Lannercost Street flanked by corner side porches with integrally designed steps and building entries
- smooth rendered finish and mouldings including the porch columns, capitals moulded string lines and circular gable vents; and
- wrought iron patterned screens and balustrade to the subfloor areas

=== Condition ===
The original planning of Ingham Post Office comprised twin porches either side of a central breakfronted postal hall. The planning arrangement is assumed to have provided a dual but independent operation of the postal and telegraphic functions. Details of the original internal planning arrangement are not known and further obscured by the subsequent removal and/or concealment of fabric, as well as the additions to the building on the south and east sides. This includes the enlargement and refurbishment of the post shop, the addition of the loading dock, and the extended mailroom wing and verandah. Photographic evidence indicates the east porch was one bay wide and two deep, behind which the transverse gable (located at a lower ridge height that the one currently) included a separate side entry and steps and windows protected by a shingled sunhood. The rear timber reverse-framed section may be associated with the 1875 building.

Gvien the changed pattern of use, the building's original design is limited to the street frontage, specifically the projecting north and west gables, west porch and entry, smooth rendered finish and mouldings, and the east verandah and entry to the extent of the first bay. The extended east wing and south service additions demonstrate the ongoing use of the site but have altered/concealed much of the original interior fabric and detailing. That which remains is generally associated with the assumed 1875 section at the rear and is of conventional construction - timber panelling, timber-panelled doors and the like. Changes associated with the enlargement of the Australia Post retail shop including the installation of shelving which conceals the front window wall and suspended acoustic tile ceilings which disrupt the general sense of enclosure.

Externally, the multi-colour paint scheme appears to be non-original and a number of original openings have been infilled.

=== Original fabric ===
The original fabric of the building included:

- Structural frame: Generally, loadbearing masonry construction on brick piers with timber floor and roof framing.
- External walls: Hard render perimeter walls with a moulded string line at the ground floor level. Window openings have multipane double hung sash windows with projecting sills. Verandah piers have moulded capitals and bases. The front gable has a dentilled broken pediment, below which is a bracketed sunhood across the trio of front windows. The gables to the north and west elevations have central circular vents with louvres, moulded surrounds and keystones. The rear walls (south) are timber-framed with weatherboards.
- Internal walls: Generally hard rendered perimeter walls with internal partitions being either concealed or removed. Elsewhere timber-framed partitions have been constructed, lined with asbestos or plasterboard, with no architraves and vinyl skirting. The rear timber framed section of the building (which may incorporate the original 1875 structure) has vertical board wall linings on a reverse hardwood frame and timber panel doors. The east mail sorting room addition uses steel? structural columns and aluminium-framed highlight glazing.
- Floor: Timber boarded floors generally with moulded timber skirting boards, subsequently lined with carpet and vinyl. The east porch has timber flooring supported on steel bearers (this structure is likely to be associated with the mailroom extension). Later rear south additions have concrete slab floors. The entry steps to the side porches are concrete with metal balustrades.
- Ceiling: Generally concealed by suspended acoustic tiles or plasterboard associated with the east extension of the mailroom. Timber boarded ceilings are intact in the rear (south) section (which may incorporate the original 1875 structure).
- Roof: Hipped roof is timber-framed originally lined with corrugated material (possibly asbestos) and subsequently relined with galvanised corrugated iron. Generally, fascias are painted timber with boxed eaves and new roof rainwater goods. The rear timber section has exposed rafters and a timber slatted eave soffit.
- Front building inscription "INGHAM POST OFFICE" is in red lettering.
- The front sunhood has a metal sheet shingle roof and is supported by four oversized painted cast cement brackets.
- Timber slats enclose the subfloor along the rear wall.
- Decorative metal grilles to sub floor vents.

=== Timeline of the building ===
1875: First post office opened.

1895: Application made for a subdivision for a School of Arts reserve from the Post and Telegraph site.

1935: The post office constructed with the retention of elements of the 1875 timber post office at the rear.

1957: Construction of neighbouring Commonwealth Bank. It is likely that during this time the east wing mailroom addition was constructed and telegraph facilities relocated to the new Ingham Exchange built in the same year. The works involved the removal of the original sunhood, windows, door and timber steps in the former east elevation. The new roof appears to have been constructed at a higher pitch but general detailing associated with the original gable, verandah and piers is matched.

c.1995: Addition of steel-framed skillion structure at the rear (south) lined with fibre cement weatherboards on a concrete slab. The area provided storage for bikes, a forklift and a loading dock accessible to the mailroom.

c.1995: Refurbishment of the postal retail area with standard Australia Post livery.

== Heritage listing ==
The significant components of Ingham Post Office include the main original 1935 building component. The heritage listing does not incorporate the later post-1957 east wing, the timber and metal-framed non-original additions to the rear of the building, the brick exchange buildings located to the rear of the property, nor the tall steel-framed telecommunications tower.

Ingham Post Office was listed on the Australian Commonwealth Heritage List on 22 August 2012 having satisfied the following criteria.

Criterion A: Processes

Ingham Post Office was constructed in 1935 to a design by the Commonwealth Department of the Interior under Horace Mackennal. It is one of many small to medium-sized single-storey post offices designed and built throughout Queensland during the interwar period to service its towns and regional centres; it was also expanded in the 1950s when the area's sugar cane industry underwent an expansionist phase. The post office was built on the site of the former 1875 post and telegraph office, and sections of the earlier timber-framed structure may be retained on the south side of the building. The post office, with the original 1935 component still discernible and largely intact externally, is also a component of the civic and commercial precinct of Ingham, sharing this with the nearby Hinchinbrook Shire Chambers and Library; these aspects of the building enhance the historical value.

Criterion D: Characteristic values

Ingham Post Office is an example of:

- a retail post office typology (third generation 1930–1974)
- an interwar c.1915–1942 in the Neo-Georgian style (Colonial Revival)
- the work of Commonwealth Department of the Interior under Horace Mackennal)

Typologically, Ingham Post Office, built in 1935, is an example of a third generation retail post office. This generation of typologies demonstrate an emergent retail function in postal operations, separation of the telephone exchange area and increased requirements for larger post office box lobby areas with independent access and serviced by a frontally positioned mail sorting room and/or a rear loading yard. These aspects are evident in the original design to the extent it comprised a symmetrically composed twin porch arrangement, with a central breakfront postal hall to Lannercost Street. Subsequent extensions to the building, including the later east wing, have altered the original plan and form and therefore impacted on this aspect of the original typology, albeit they have generally reinforced the primacy of the private box function and enlarged mailroom facility.

In the state context, and with regard to post offices still owned and operated by Australia Post, Ingham Post Office is one of three "Type M6 1930s Twin Porch" built in the period 1935–38 with similar characteristics. As with the Bowen Post Office and the Ayr Post Office, Ingham Post Office demonstrates the basic composition of a symmetrical expanded porch (at least externally) but is considered the most altered of the three.

Stylistically, the building's pedimented gable front is conservative, particularly by Government architecture standards of the time, but arguably of interest as one of the last generally Colonial-Revival post offices in Australia (albeit altered). The detail is heavy but perhaps intentionally so to give added municipal presence on a wayside frontage that is also the main thoroughfare through town.

Criterion E: Aesthetic characteristics

Ingham Post Office has some aesthetic qualities in the immediate context, deriving from the prominent and original pedimented gabled frontage to Lannercost Street, and enhanced by the Colonial-flavoured verandahs and porch entries.
