= RAAF Base Amberley heritage structures =

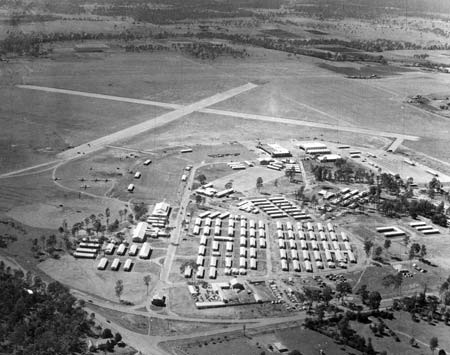
- Aerial view of RAAF Base Amberley, March 1941

- Location within Queensland
- 27.6394°S 152.7072°E
- Location: RAAF Base Amberley at Southern Amberley Road, Amberley, Queensland, Australia

Commonwealth Heritage List
- Official name: Amberley RAAF Base Group
- Type: Listed place (Historic)
- Designated: 22 June 2004
- Reference no.: 105650

RAAF Base Amberley heritage structures is a heritage-listed military installation at RAAF Base Amberley on Southern Amberley Road, Amberley, Queensland, Australia. It was added to the Australian Commonwealth Heritage List on 22 June 2004.

== History ==
=== Pastoral phase to 1938 ===
The development of the base focussed around the access point from Old Toowoomba Road (now Rosewood Road) a short distance to the south east of the Amberley State School. Evidence of this phase within the base includes the two-roomed original school building and the headmaster's residence. A camphor laurel tree is located adjacent to the school. The school complex now forms part of 301 WG Training Flight.

The residence has been rotated at ninety degrees and sits on concrete stumps. It is a single-storey weatherboard lined house with corrugated iron hip roof and a hipped roof extension at the rear with brick chimney. The building features a front timber verandah.

The school building is of typical design and features single-storeyed form on stumps and a steeply pitched corrugated iron roof extending over the front verandah. The gabled end bay of the building features a deep bank of casement windows with timber and corrugated iron window hood. The timber verandah details include post-and-rail balustrading. Extended sympathetically to create a new library, the extension features hopper windows.

=== Pre-World War Two phase 1938–1939 ===
Most of the buildings in this phase were, although designed before the start of World War II in September 1939, completed or begun after the start of the war. British designed, the original defence base precinct is clearly distinguished from later World War II construction by its more permanent construction in brick. The precinct comprises a diamond-shaped area approximately 400 metres (1,300 ft) wide and 200 metres (660 ft) broad. At the southern end is the Commanding Officer's headquarters and support buildings (buildings 246 & 65) and at the northern apex the hospital (buildings 61 & 62). The centre of the diamond contains the parade ground (242), now a car park, with the saluting base to one side. The influence on planning of the diamond-shaped command precinct and the Base itself is clearly evident in the road extending from the Guardhouse (building 21), which terminates the main approach to the Base from the Old Toowoomba Road. The geometry of this early planning is reinforced by the workshop and maintenance hangar zone which retains the 13 Bellman Hangars, in addition to Hangar 76, erected by 1941.

The buildings show some contrast in materials with many of the early buildings in brick. A number of Norfolk Island pines are located at the eastern end of the precinct with two flanking the Air Base Headquarters. These and other landscape elements including fig trees appear to have been planted c.1960. Individual structures of significance within and adjacent to the precinct are described below.

==== Command Headquarters (building 65) ====
Constructed 1939–40, the building was the former Command Post housing the senior command of 301 Air Base HQ. Evidence suggests that similar buildings occur at RAAF Base Townsville and at Changi in Singapore. The location and axial symmetry of the building reflect the hierarchical, formal planning of the pre-World War II base. The building is of single storey, hipped roof form with five levels of which only the ground floor occupies the full area of the building. The second level, an open mezzanine, acts as a balcony to the main area, perhaps originally the plotting room. The third level is closed and lit by small windows facing south. The fifth level is accessed by the internal timber stairs and was formerly the Intelligence unit. The fifth level is some four feet above the fourth and features a gantry and loading doors at one side. Lit by small windows, this fourth level has small openings in the floor which suggest that it may have been used as a projection room for a camera obscura or similar device, the upper three levels being subordinate to the ground floor plotting room. Similar features occur in the bomb aimer training building at RAAF Base Fairbairn, Canberra, and in the School of Instruction at Darwin RAAF Base (designed in 1940). The front entrance facing the parade ground is marked by a porch supported on timber posts. It is constructed of timber on brick foundations with weatherboard cladding externally to sill height topped by fibro-cement sheeting below corrugated fibro-cement roofing. The staircase tower is capped by a gabled roof. Windows are sash with characteristically horizontal glazing bars. With the exception of a hipped roof at Amberley, the designs at Amberley and Darwin are almost identical suggesting that the Command HQ building was initially erected for this purpose.

==== Hangar 76 ====
In 1940 the hangar appears to have been the only building on the airstrip side of Aviation Road. In common with other structures designed, and intended, to be permanent before the commencement of the war the hangar employed a high quality of design, construction and detailing. Extended during World War II, the building has an imposing entrance of stretcher-bond brickwork with ornate glass described in September 1939 as like the entrance to an hotel. It has a welded steel frame supporting a saw-tooth roof characteristic of the late 1930s and early 1940s utilitarian and workshop structures erected by the Australian Government. The rear of the original structure is also brick encased at the corners. The original design, brickwork, entrance and saw-tooth roof are intact beneath the later extensions. The building was modelled on the British RAF "C" type designed for a more peace-time function.

The Base's first control tower was located at the front right hand corner of the hangar. No traces of the tower remain except for paint marks.

==== Guardhouse (building 21) ====
The guardhouse defines the former base entrance from the old Toowoomba Road (now Rosewood Road) and is closely related to the former Amberley State School. The brick building appears to be a design complementing the brick facade of Hangar 76. Of two storey design in red brick, with lighter coloured irregularly placed brick elements, with a hipped roof in corrugated asbestos cement. The permanent form of the rectangular building is characteristic of pre-World War II defence structures and architecturally similar to that at RAAF Base Fairbairn in the ACT. The two-storey section at the northern end of the building features a central single brick chimney with string courses and two side porches with hipped roofs. It originally had five doorways and two larger garage-style doors in the northern end. Timber windows are typically single opening of sash form with horizontal glazing bars and concrete sills. Upper windows are three-light, of similar detailing to the lower floor. Internally the building has been modified; the evidence suggests that the building housed garage space in addition to the two guardhouse cells which remain in place. The upper floor is divided into three rooms probably used as offices. There are timber stairs with corbelled brickwork to internal openings in the Art Deco style.

=== World War Two phase 1939–1945 ===
The majority of buildings associated with the United States Air Force have not survived although some of the Bellman hangars may have been built by them. The following structures are significant.

==== Base Medical Flight (buildings 61 and 243) ====
Constructed by 1943, opposite the command headquarters, the hospital and wards (61 & 243) completed the symmetry of the parade ground. The dental annexe has been demolished. The hospital building is in brick in the Art Deco style and features details characteristic of the style, including string courses, moulded brickwork and sash windows with horizontal glazing bars. The symmetry of the design is reflected in the central corridor below a small fleche. Internally the building features pre-op and a single operating room on opposite sides of the central corridor.

The ward is attached to one side via the post-op rooms and a linking corridor. The core areas feature granolithic floors, the rest of the building being in timber with gabled roof. The nursing areas to one side are paralleled by a wide verandah on the opposite side as an extension of the wards. The external fabric is similar to the Command HQ building in the use of weatherboards to window sill height.

==== Air Base Support (building 240) ====
A single storey timber, gabled building erected by 1943, to one side of the headquarters building is of simple pitched roof form, continuing the design idiom of the headquarters building. Building 240 is the only remaining one of seven similar buildings in the headquarters precinct area. The building was originally used as the parachute hanging room.

==== Bellman Hangars ====
The double row of Bellman Hangars, in two groups (340, 255–263 and 277–280), define the working areas of the Base during World War II. The hangars follow the eastern edge of the pre World War II base precinct and interface with the runway apron and taxiways. Designed to be dismantled and relocated easily, some 123 were cut for assembly by Lysaght of Newcastle. Although reclad in part with Colorbond sheeting and with new concrete floors, the hangars retain their essential form intact, including the wide doors and internal structural frames. Each pair is linked by a small gabled timber building. The buildings have a rectangular form, 11.5 by 16.5 metres (38 ft × 54 ft), with precut galvanised steel frames, low pitched roof and large sliding steel framed doors. Bellman hangar 745, associated with the Air Movements Building, appears to be relatively intact, contains older type equipment and cargo scales and was probably relocated from Uranquinty in the 1960s.

The semi-subterranean United States Operation building (building FAC AP1-1) is a concrete structure, documented in the Ipswich Heritage Register as item 03-1017 0001. One of a number of local Command Headquarters, the structure was built some distance from the base in a disused quarry due to the swampy nature of the ground at Amberley. The structure appears to have been a shared facility between US and RAAF commands.

==== Other structures ====
A number of other structures were erected by 1943 including a cinema, Airmens Mess, Sergeants Mess, flammable liquids store, chapels, emergency power plant, a number of wooden structures and the officers mess. Brick structures amongst these include the flammable liquids store (building 84) and the emergency power generator building (20). The cinema (60) and Airmen's Mess (gymnasium 42) are two extant timber buildings of this period which clearly illustrate the large population of the Base. Both are typically timber-framed with the use of multiple timber windows, gabled roofs and weatherboard to window sill height. Building 4, the former Sergeant's Mess, employs similar architectural idiom to create a tightly knit group identifying the social and mess areas of the Base during the war years 1939–45 and subsequently. Building 20, the emergency power plant building, in brick, reflects the wartime operation of the Base. The chapels and Officers Mess are now located off base.

=== Post-War Phase 1946–1968 ===
Most of the structures associated with the Korean War have been demolished. A number of significant structures of interest have been identified to date.

==== Safety Equipment building (building 467) ====
Constructed 1954–55, this timber-framed structure is important for its ability to illustrate functions specific to air safety. Relocated in 1970 to its present site, the building was used for drying and packing parachutes.

==== Riley-Newsum cottages ====
The Timber Riley-Newsum prefabricated cottages are a remnant of some 30 such buildings on the base imported from the United Kingdom in the 1950s in response to a lack of building materials and workmen in the immediate post war years. "Units" were imported from Lincoln, England, manufactured by H Newsum and Sons Co Ltd, to meet the shortages.

==== Cartridge stores ====
Two starter cartridges stores (building 763), erected during the 1960s, and used by Canberra bombers involved in testing at Maralinga, have been identified as being of interest.

Some structures remain to illustrate the era of the Vietnam War. These comprise a small precinct which includes helipads and Lysaght Metal Huts erected 1967–68. Buildings 94 and 95-103 were constructed as a training and instruction area for Army pilots using helicopters and small fixed-wing planes. The huts are larger than the standard Defence Force accommodation huts and of historic importance for their association with the Vietnam War. Structures erected specifically for the Vietnam War are rare.

=== F-111 Phase 1968– present ===
The present F-111 phase of the base's operation is particularly important for its role in Australia's defence.

== Description ==
RAAF Base Amberley heritage structures is at southern Amberley Road corner Rosewood Road, Amberley Air Base, Amberley, comprising the following:

- The diamond-shaped Command Precinct including parade ground (242) and associated landscaping
- 21 The Guardhouse (Museum) at the base entrance and the road to the Command Precinct
- 65 The 301 Air Base Headquarters
- 61 and 243 The Base Medical Flight Building
- 240 The Air Base support building
- 76 Hangar 76
- AP1-1 The semi subterranean operations building, off Southern Amberley Road
- 745 The Bellman hangar
- AP6-26 and 27 The Riley Newsum houses, Gannett Street
- 30 and 31 School House and Residence
- 95–103 The Army Helicopter and Fixed Wing training area (former) known as Silver City (8 buildings one missing)
- 20 Emergency Power Generator
- 60 Cinema
- 42 Airmen's Mess (Gymnasium)
- 41 Sergeants Mess
- 340, 255–258, 260–263, 277–280 Bellman Hangars
- 467 Air Safety Building

=== Integrity ===
The area of the World War Two facilities retains its relationship to the runways (despite realignment of the main runway), and the former Toowoomba Road and former Amberley State School. The planning of the World War Two facilities stemmed from the alignment of the airstrip and the relationship of the diamond-shaped command precinct to the Old Toowoomba Road. This geometry is evident in the road system which extends from the diamond-shaped precinct reinforced by the placement of repetitive structures including Bellman hangars. The guardhouse is clearly located at the end of the major traffic route linking the entrance to the command precinct and parade ground. The pre World War Two planning and functional relationships are clearly evident in the extant fabric of the site.

As at 2002, the individual structures have undergone some degree of adaptation and alteration.

=== Condition ===
As at 2002, individual structures are generally in good condition as would be expected on an operational RAAF base. The site includes reactive soil types, which have resulted in some degree of settlement.

== Heritage listing ==
RAAF Base Amberley heritage structures were listed on the Australian Commonwealth Heritage List on 22 June 2004 having satisfied a number of criteria.

Amberley RAAF Base is important for its association with the development of an Australian Air Force under the Lyons government in 1938, in response to renewed hostilities in Europe prior to the onset of World War Two. The strategic location of the Base in Australia's northern areas during World War Two, saw it serve as the major departure point for traffic to and from the United States and major Pacific ports, to theatres of war in the Pacific and as a major depot for the maintenance, salvage and assembly of new aircraft. This major role continued when the base played a significant role in the Korean War, atomic testing at Maralinga, in South Australia, and during Australia's involvement in the Vietnam War. Amberley RAAF Base is now the home of Australia's Strike Reconnaissance Group and the associated Command and Training Units. The base was involved in the establishment of the Trans-Australian Airline (TAA) through the transfer and maintenance of Dakota DC3s from the RAAF in the post-war period. (Criterion A.4)

These historical processes and events are associated with individual structures, alignments and precincts from the pre-war, World War Two and post-war periods.

The pre, and early, World War Two facilities are important in demonstrating the design and operation of pre-World War Two air force bases under British influences. Amberley RAAF Base is one of the few surviving examples of pre World War Two Air Force planning and construction under British influence. A key planning feature is the diamond-shaped command and administration area, which is linked to the Guardhouse (21) by the original access road, which separated the hangars and airstrip from the other areas of the base. The diamond-shaped precinct includes the 301 Air Base HQ (65), the Base Medical Flight building (61 & 243), the Air Base support building (246) and the parade ground (242) and associated landscaping, including mature Norfolk Island pines and fig trees. Hangar 76, the largest hangar of the period, is closely linked to the Air Base HQ. Other structures important in illustrating the wartime functional layout of the Base include the Emergency Power Generator building (20), the Cinema (60), Airmens Mess (42) and Sergeants Mess (41). The Guardhouse (21), identifying the original base entrance, illustrates the operational context of the base during World War Two and is linked both visually and by road with the command precinct. (Criterion A.4 and Criterion B.2)

Individual structures within the pre and early World War Two facilities important for their ability to demonstrate the principal characteristics of their type include: the 301 Air Base HQ (65); the Air Base support building (246); Hangar 76; and the Guardhouse (21). Both Buildings 246 and 65 illustrate the use of the prevailing vernacular timber style favoured for utilitarian and functional buildings such as Buildings 41, 42 and 60. Building 240 is an example of the P1 type hut, Building 65 is an interpretation of a standard design with camera obscura for training Bombing crews. Hangar 76, the Base Medical Flight Building (61, 243) and the Guardhouse (21) characteristically display the use of fairface brick and the use of the Art Deco style employed for permanent structures in the lead up to the Second World War and the use of standard design solutions. Building 84, Flammable Liquids Store, in brick is representative of the smaller, permanent stores of the wartime period. (Criteria D.2 and E.1)

The Bellman hangars (340, 255–258, 260–263 and 277–280) are important in demonstrating the adaptation of existing manufacturing techniques to air defence infrastructure in Australia, following the involvement of the United States in the Second World War in 1942 and the subsequent widespread use of prefabrication. As a group, the 13 hangars are important in illustrating the primary function of the Base for maintenance and repair during World War Two and the operational layout of the Base. Bellman hangar 744, part of the Air Movements Building, is essentially intact and can be regarded as a particularly good example of its type. (Criterion A.4 and Criterion D.2)

The strategically located former semi-subterranean operations building (FAC AP1-1) of 1942 illustrates the need to separate strategic command functions during wartime operations and was directly associated with American forces, as a communication base, during the Vietnam War. (Criterion A.4)

The Riley-Newsum cottages (AP8-26 & 27) are important as examples of the Commonwealth Government's response in the 1950s to post-war shortages of building materials and the decline of the housing construction industry during the war years 1939–1945. (Criterion A.4)

Building 467, the Air Safety Building, used for drying and packing parachutes, is important in illustrating the design of utilitarian structures during the Korean War period and a rare example of its type. (Criteria A.4, B.2 and D.2)

The former Army Helicopter and Fixed Wing training area known as "Silver City" is significant for its association with the Vietnam War era. Structures erected specifically for the Vietnam War are regarded as rare. (Criterion A.4 and Criterion B.2)

The history of settlement and the origins of the name Amberley are expressed in the two buildings comprising the former Amberley State School, once a focus for the rural community, on Old Toowoomba Road. The former school building and headmaster's residence, erected in 1903, are important in demonstrating the design and construction of government designed school buildings in the early twentieth century. (Criterion A.4 and Criterion D.2)
