= ABC Radio Studios, Rockhampton =

ABC Radio Studios
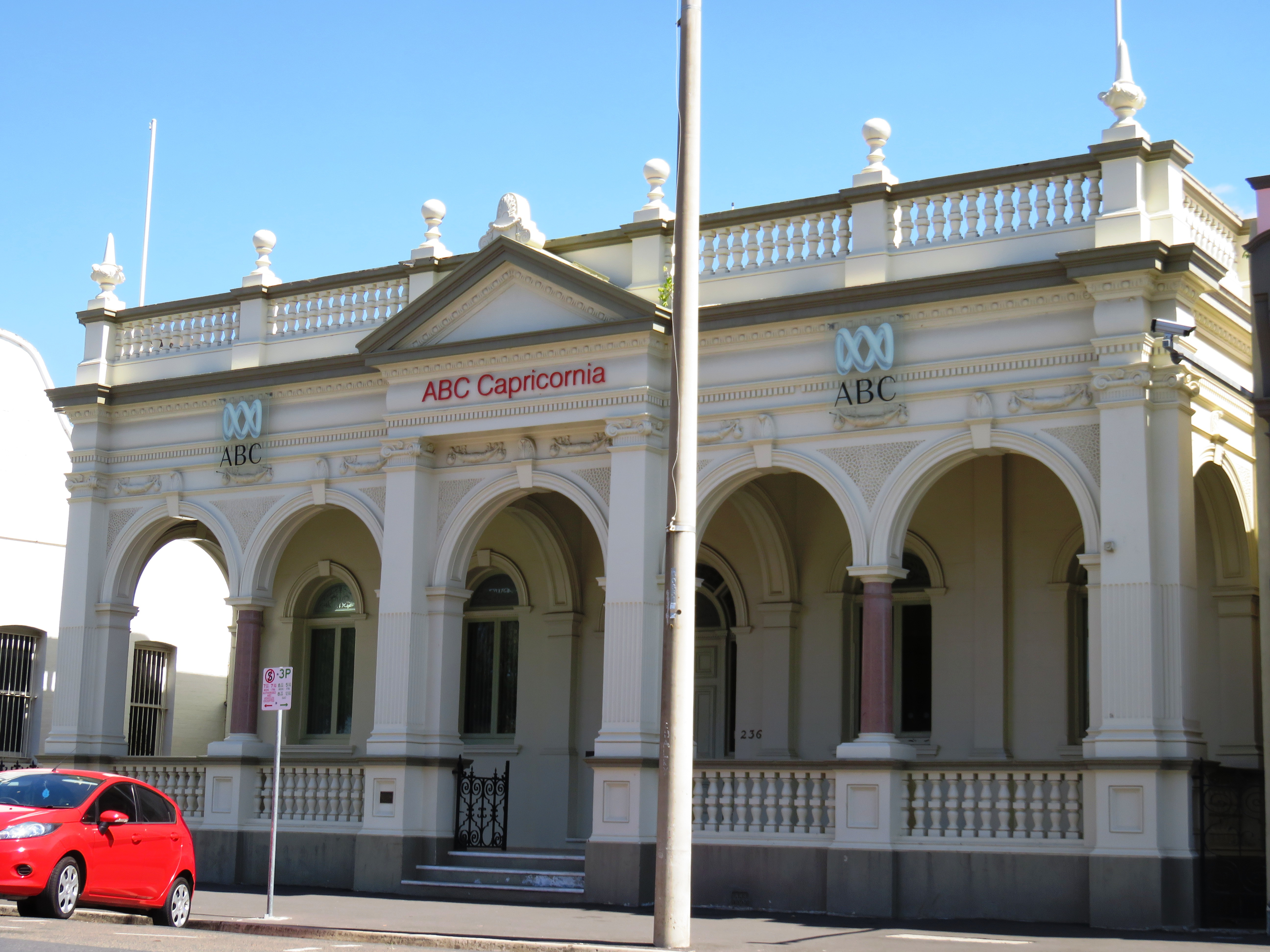
- ABC Capricornia building, 2017

- Location within Queensland
- 23.3801°S 150.5157°E
- Location: 236 Quay Street, Rockhampton City Rockhampton, Rockhampton Region, Queensland, Australia

Commonwealth Heritage List
- Official name: ABC Radio Studios
- Type: Listed place (Historic)
- Designated: 14 September 2009
- Reference no.: 105420

ABC Radio Studios are heritage-listed radio studios at 236 Quay Street, Rockhampton City, Rockhampton, Rockhampton Region, Queensland, Australia. It was added to the Australian Commonwealth Heritage List on 14 September 2009.

== History ==
The development of Rockhampton commenced in the 1850s with the Archer brothers Charles and William who established a pastoral run "Gracemere" station with a few thousand sheep, 10 km north of the present city centre. Provisions for the property were brought in via the Fitzroy River to the furthest point that ships could navigate and that point gave rise to a small settlement on the banks of the river, Rockhampton. Gold was discovered 70 km north of Rockhampton at Canoona Station in 1858, rapidly followed by the arrival of thousands of people. The Canoona gold rush was short lived but people stayed on and the town of Rockhampton developed. The town was laid out in 1858 with the main street one street back from the river to allow for port activity to concentrate at the river and the town declared a port with a customs reserve.

Gold mining had commenced at Mount Morgan in 1882 (32 km south west of Rockhampton) when Fred Morgan and his five brothers pegged a claim at Ironstone Mountain. Mining at Mount Morgan in 1882 was originally to recover gold, but considerable quantities of silver and copper were also discovered. The Morgans had sold all shares in the Mount Morgan Mine by 1886 to the remaining partners of the original syndicate, Thomas Skarrat Hall, William Knox D'arcy and William Pattison. The Mount Morgan Gold Mining Company Ltd was floated in 1886 with eight trustees owning one million one pound shares.

The Mount Morgan Gold Mining Company Ltd controlled the mining leases between 1886 and 1927. The company went into liquidation in 1927 following a disastrous underground fire and deliberate flooding of the workings in 1925. The company was reformed as Mount Morgan Limited (MML) in 1928. MML began open cut mining in 1932 and by the time mining ceased in 1981 more than 145 megatonnes of ore and overburden had been handled. During the 108-year life of the mine approximately 262 tonnes of gold, 37 tonnes of silver and 387,000 tonnes of copper were mined from Mount Morgan from underground and open cut operations. The mine closed in 1990.

The former Mount Morgan Gold Mining Company office in Quay Street was erected in 1897 for the trustees of the Mount Morgan Gold Mining Company. The rendered masonry building is an outstanding component of the 19th century character of Quay Street and was a direct manifestation of the wealth which Mount Morgan gold brought to Rockhampton. Quay Street was the centre of trade for Central Queensland and operated as a port city with its magnificent Customs House until the 1950s when the port was closed. By 1882 it was connected to Baracaldine and as a result the wealth from the central west grazing was funnelled through the port. Rockhampton was also a centre for brewery, meatworks and other industries. The gold boom of the Mount Morgan mine added additional wealth to the city and stimulated the building and rebuilding of the Quay Street architecture.

The site for the company office was acquired by the Mount Morgan Gold Mining Company in August 1896, ten years after the floating of the company in 1886.

The Mount Morgan Gold Mining Company building was constructed in 1897 as the headquarters of the company and was used for board meetings as well as for the storage of gold awaiting shipment from the river wharves across from Quay Street. The building was positioned near the other principal business premises of Rockhampton, which had developed along Quay Street to serve the passing trade at the wharves.

Along with the Mining Company building, a range of buildings were constructed in Quay Street consisting of Mount Morgan Gold Mining company building, the Rockhampton Club, the Commercial and Criterion Hotel and the Rockhampton Harbour Board Building.

In 1913, the Mining Company building was leased to the New Zealand Loan & Mercantile Company from who later purchased the building in 1920.

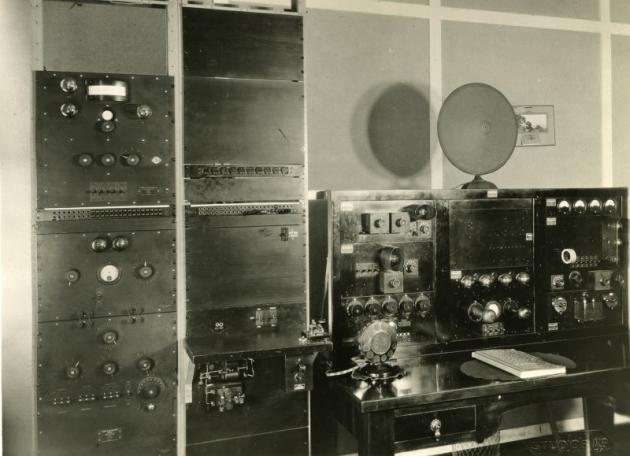
4RK control room equipment, 1931

In June 1963 the Australian Government purchased the building for use as television station for the Australian Broadcasting Commission (ABC). Tenders were called for the conversion of the building by the Commonwealth Department of Works in July 1963. The conversion plans included provisions for sound proofing and air-conditioning in some parts as well as a video-tape room, telecine room, control room, studio, news room, general offices, technician's room, a film dispatch room and a facilities room. The ABC occupied the former Mount Morgan Gold Mining Company offices as well as the building adjacent on the southern side and connected the two via a temporary garage structure. The establishment of the studio cost £500,000.

Radio broadcasting commenced in the region in 1931 as the commercial station 4RK but became part of the ABC in 1932 known as ABC Capricornia. The studios broadcasts local and networked programs 24 hours a day and is active in community and industry events in the region. It is the base for a television reports and camera operator/editor. It is one of the most technologically up to date regional studios in the country.

The building originally had a central courtyard, which has been roofed over, and numerous internal cedar doors, which are no longer extant. The front elevation of the building is substantially intact and still displays its original lead lighting and etched glass. The building continues to function as an ABC radio station.

== Description ==
ABC Radio Studios is at 236 Quay Street, Rockhampton, being Lot 257on R1675, Parish of Rockhampton, County of Livingstone.

The former Mount Morgan Gold Mining Company building, a single-storeyed rendered masonry structure whose roof is concealed behind a parapet, is located fronting Quay Street overlooking the Fitzroy River to the northeast. The building has access from Quay Lane at the rear.

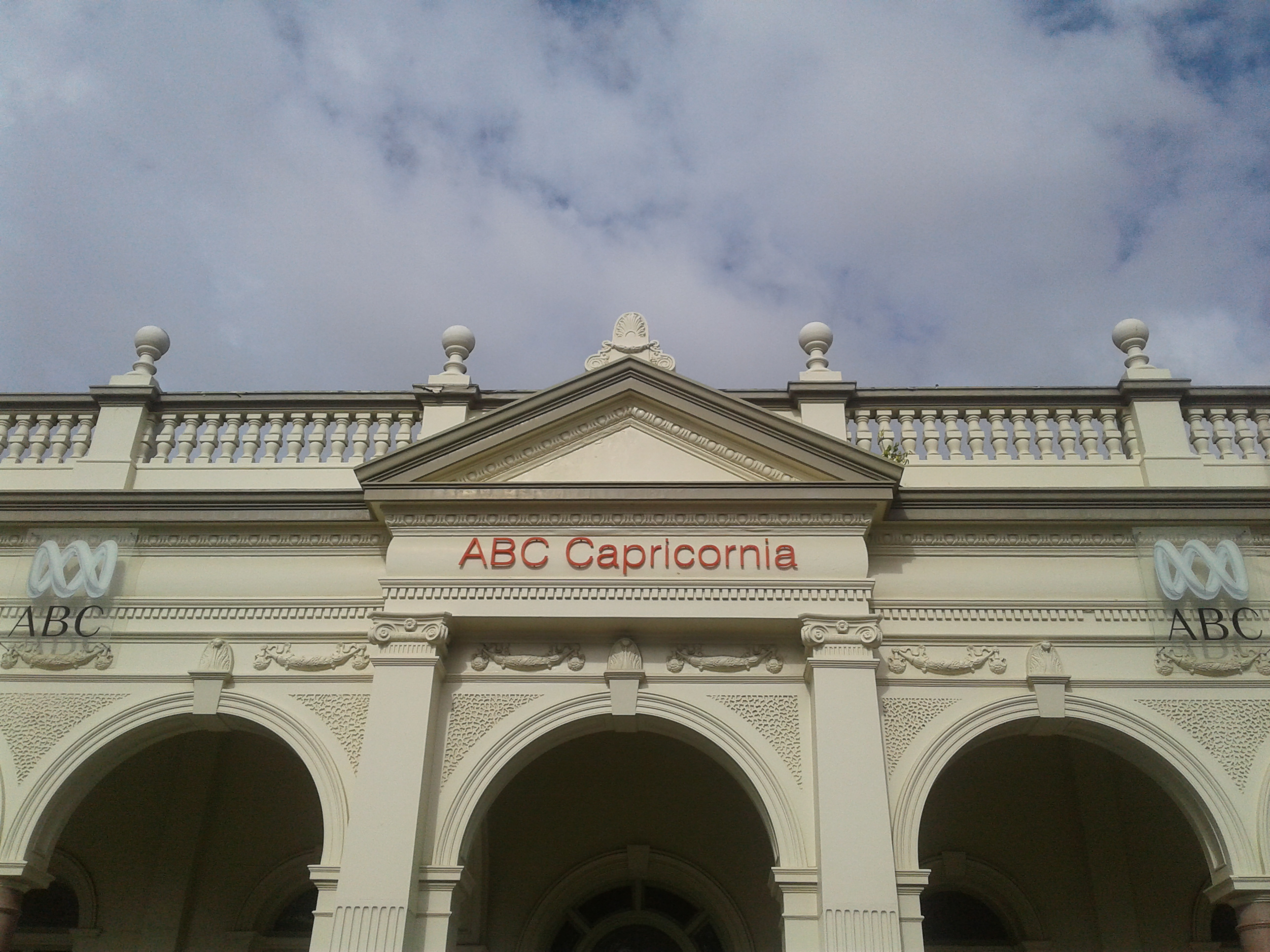
Signage on the pediment, 2017

The symmetrical Quay Street elevation comprises five arches, which form an arcade with a central entrance, surmounted by a deep entablature with a moulded balustrade parapet with pedestals crowned by moulded ornaments. The central entrance is flanked by pilasters, which have fluting to the lower section of the shaft, supporting a triangular pediment surmounted by a moulded ornament at the apex. The pediment and cornice have egg and dart mouldings, the architrave has dentils, and the pilasters surmount tall pedestals, which flank entrance steps with low wrought iron gates. The arches have expressed imposts, extrados and keystones, and are surmounted by a frieze with moulded swags. The paired arches either side of the entrance have a central granite column with an Ionic capital, surmounting a tall pedestal flanked by a moulded balustrade. The arcade has pilasters at either end, above which flagpoles are mounted behind the parapet.

The Quay Street elevation detailing runs the width of the arcade either end of the building. The building has paired wrought iron gates on the southern side for vehicle access, and a single wrought iron gate on the northern side.

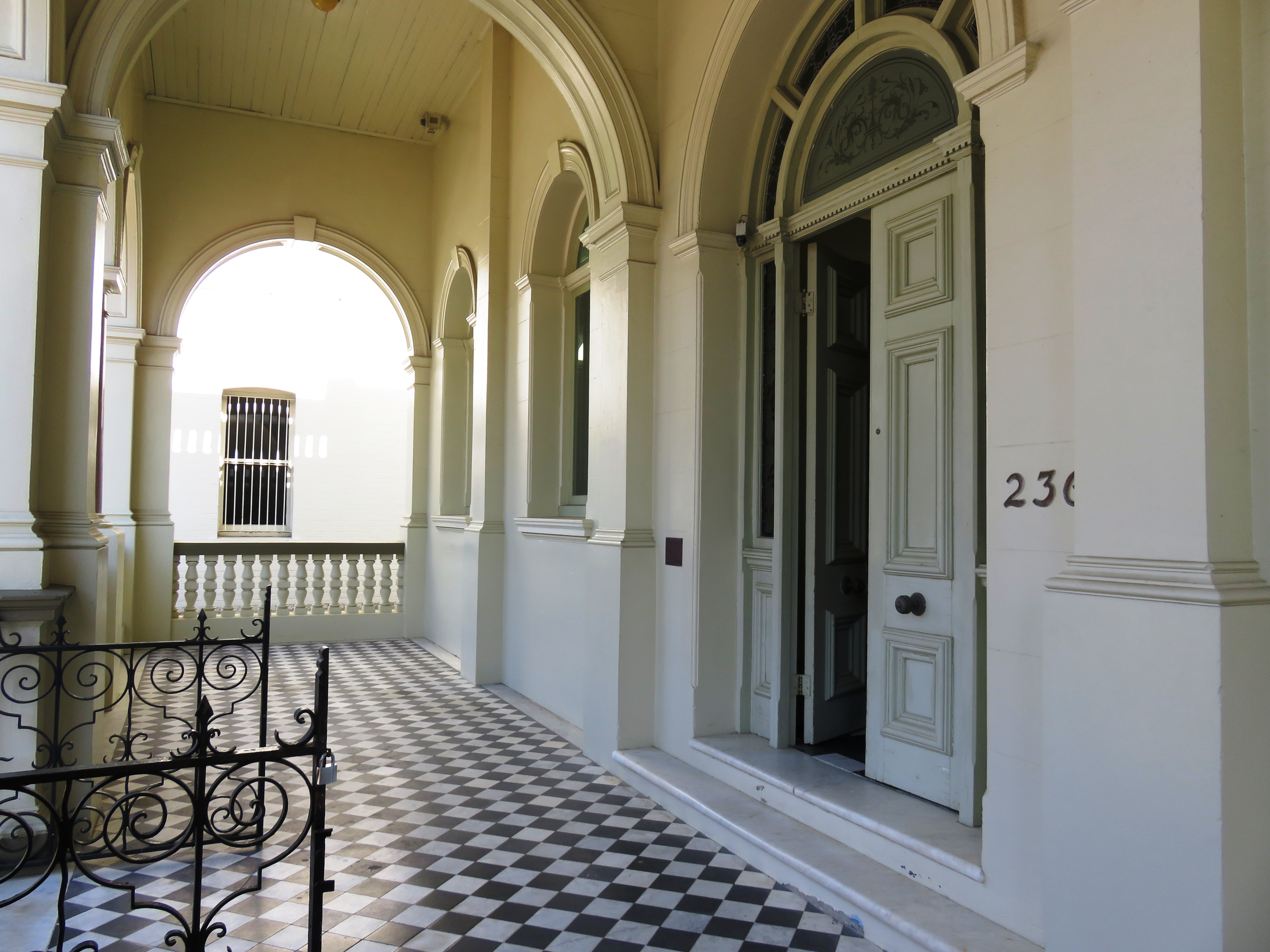
ABC Radio Studios entrance arcade, 2017

The arcade has paired timber-panelled entrance doors with sidelights and an arched fanlight containing etched glass and leadlight panels. The entrance is flanked by two casement windows with arched headers to either side, all of which have expressed imposts, extrados and keystones. The arcade has arches at either end, with two cross arches framing the entrance. The floor of the arcade has diagonally-laid black-and-white marble tiles, the ceiling is boarded, and the rendered wall is scribed to imitate coursing.

A garage structure has been constructed on the southern side, setback from the street, infilling the space between this and the adjacent building. The original arched header sash windows opening to the southern side have been bricked-up. The northern side of the building is finished in painted brickwork, with sash windows with security bars and high-level fanlight panels.

The rear of the building appears to consist of an early section constructed along Quay Lane, with a courtyard space between the main building which has been roofed over. An opening at the southern end has also been infilled with brickwork. The rear wall is painted brickwork, with a series of arched header windows and a central entrance door.

Internally, the building has a central corridor with rooms opening to either side. The building has a suspended ceiling throughout, and most of the rendered masonry walls have been lined with compressed sheeting for either decorative or soundproofing purposes. A reception area with partitioned offices is located at the front of the building, behind which is the former strongroom which has been converted into a radio studio. Three large rooms along the southern side of the building have been converted into television studios and editing rooms. Much of the original detailing has been obscured by later alterations to the building, but some panelled timber doors survive, as do architraves and window sills. The rear television studio has a rendered dado and skirtings, and perforated wall sheeting frames the arched header sash windows.

The rear section of the building has a lower floor level than the front section, and comprises studios, equipment and storage rooms, with staff facilities at the rear fronting Quay Lane. The roof in the rear supports a satellite dish.

=== Condition ===
In 1998 the place was inspected and that maintenance works were completed that enhanced the heritage values. As at 2006, the interior was extensively altered, though the exterior is currently well maintained.

== Heritage listing ==
ABC Radio Studios was listed on the Australian Commonwealth Heritage List on 14 September 2009 having satisfied the following criteria.

Criterion A: Processes

The building, constructed in 1897, as an administration office for the Mount Morgan Gold Mining Company, has a strong link to the period when the Mount Morgan Mine was the richest gold mine in the world, and stimulated an economic boom in Rockhampton.

Criterion D: Characteristic values

Although modest in scale, the building is an example of the Federation Academic Classical style well expressed in the classical proportions of the arcaded verandah, the use of arched bays with granite columns and decorated Ionic pilasters and the parapet concealing the roof. The ABC Studio Building is an integral unit of the stylistic expression of the streetscape.

The building retains its original fabric and form in the gable roofs and internal layout of central corridor.

Criterion E: Aesthetic characteristics

The ABC Studio is an important visual aesthetic contributor to the Quay Street streetscape. Its aesthetic characteristics are its scale, form and stylistic design that create an attractive image that is in harmony with the adjacent streetscape buildings. It is the centre piece of a group of three single storey buildings of classical style. The front façade exhibits a high degree of detail in finishes and craftsmanship that contribute to the designed aesthetic characteristics of the place and the streetscape. It is a strong contributor to image of the historic city of Rockhampton, particularly the 19th Century Quay Street streetscape.

The aesthetic characteristics are the ornate character of the period façade, the harmony of the building with its neighbours and within the streetscape due to the physical expression of its historic style, its form and its scale. These characteristics are well recognised and documented by the community as reflected in the 1976 report by the National Trust of Australia. The value is appreciated by the local community as reflected in the listing by the National Trust and the local government.
