= Boonah Post Office =

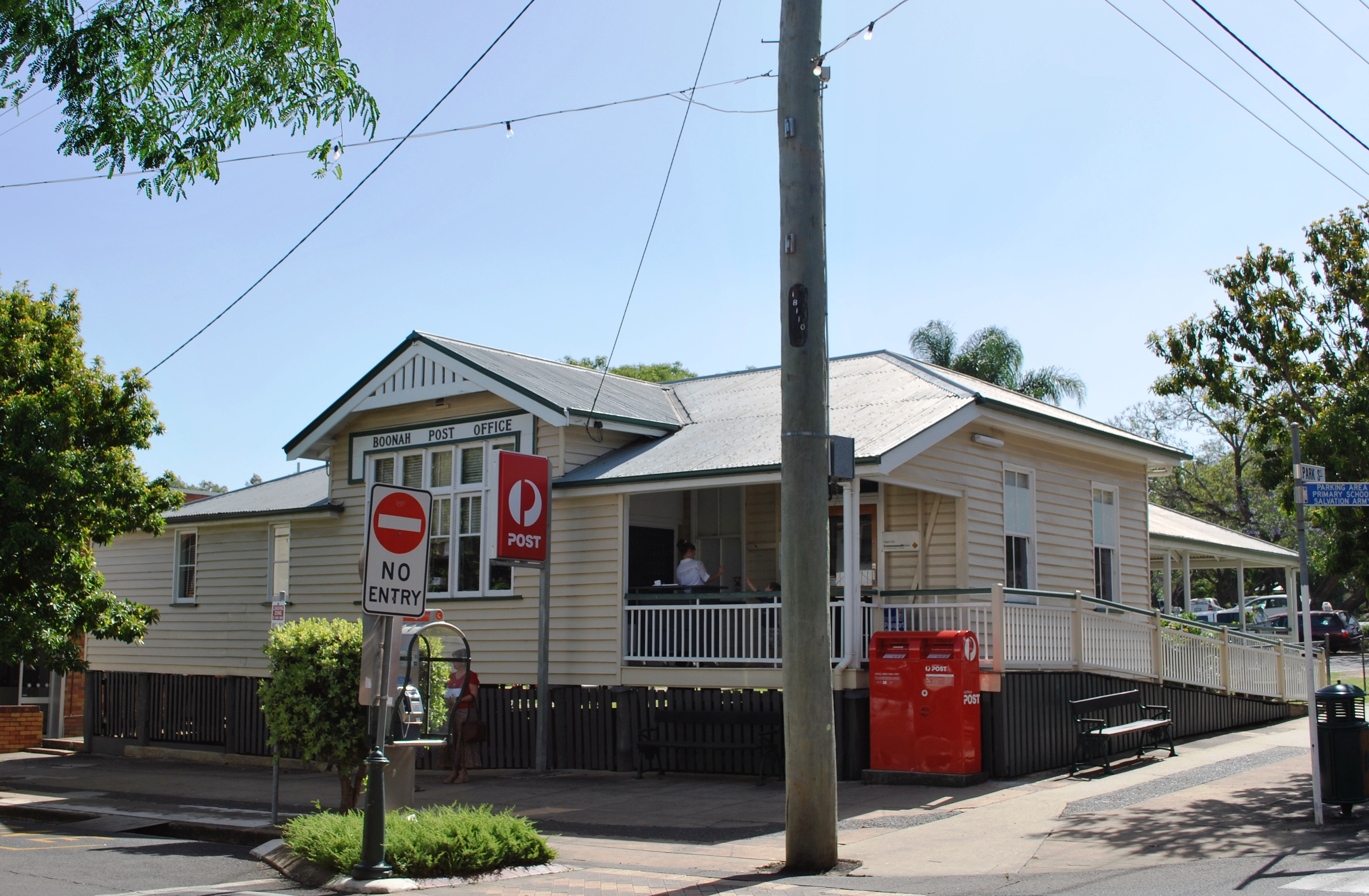
- Boonah Post Office, 2008

- Location within Queensland
- 27.9975°S 152.6819°E
- Location: 1 Park Street, Boonah, Scenic Rim Region, Queensland, Australia

Site notes
- Architect: Queensland Government Architect's Office
- Owner: Australia Post

Commonwealth Heritage List
- Official name: Boonah Post Office
- Type: Listed place (Historic)
- Designated: 8 November 2011
- Reference no.: 106123

Boonah Post Office is a heritage-listed post office at 1 Park Street, Boonah, Scenic Rim Region, Queensland, Australia. The building was designed by the Queensland Government Architect's Office. It was added to the Australian Commonwealth Heritage List on 8 November 2011.

== History ==
Originally known as the Goolman Division, the township of Boonah is located 84 kilometres (52 mi) southwest of Brisbane. Established in 1882 as a service centre for the surrounding agricultural district, Goolman was renamed Boonah in 1937 (not to be confused with present-day Goolman, a suburb in the City of Ipswich). The Post and Telegraph Reserve was surveyed in 1888 and initially covered the entire town block on which the present building is located. The reserve was resurveyed and subdivided in May 1898 and finalised in October of the same year.

The Boonah Post and Telegraph Office was built prior to 1900, probably between 1888 and 1898 (a date of 1893 is also possible). The front and side elevations were extensively remodelled in 1910–11 to standard plans of the period. In 1924 a telephone exchange was added to the southern side of the front portion of the building. Minor alterations were made to the verandah in 1948.

The building was designed by the Queensland Government Architect's Office for both pre-1900 and 1910–11 phases, as this was prior to the Australian Government taking responsibility for the design and construction of post offices.

== Description ==
Boonah Post Office is at 1 Park Street, Boonah, comprising the whole of Lot 1 RP128181.

The Boonah Post Office is on a gently graded, regularly-shaped corner site which is defined on the east by the town's principal commercial and retail street, High Street, and on the north by Park Street. The original plan of subdivision, dated 1888 indicates that the rear of the site was flanked by the railway line and reserve, though this is now the location of Yeates Avenue. The original post office building is raised substantially above street level and the frontage addresses High Street, though the main verandah, private post box area and access is now via the Park Street frontage.

The original quarters component is attached to the western side of the post office building, and is set back from the Park Street frontage. Vehicular access to the site is via an asphalted driveway at the northwest corner which is enclosed by a non-original chainwire fence. The site is flanked to the west by the Boonah State School and to the south by mixed commercial and retail development. The precinct is defined by the double-storey Victorian-era Commercial Hotel on the opposite corner.

Though the Boonah Post Office and Quarters were built in the late 1800s, the office exterior as now viewed from High Street results mostly from alterations completed around 1910–11 and 1924. The Park Street side, with its bungalow-styled quarters and projecting wing, still appears largely as constructed. This elevation consists of a symmetrical verandah for the quarters, set back from the street, with a near-pyramidal hipped timber-framed roof clad with corrugated galvanised iron. A smaller trailing kitchen wing containing the former kitchen, servants' room and pantry is set back from the front of the quarters, but is linked to it externally by a continuation of the verandah. This is juxtaposed on the eastern side of the bungalow with the post office block projecting forward, also with a hipped roof, and with a pair of tall double-paned windows. A non-original ramp extends across this section, with balustrade and vertical boarding underneath to match the original.

The High Street side has an asymmetrical elevation beginning, for circulation purposes, with a corner porch in similar detailing to the quarters verandah. This joins the projecting bays on the Park and High street sides and was altered at an early date to accommodate private letter box bays; an original window in the east elevation has been infilled and polished timber paired double doors have been added. The 1910s post office public space is marked out with a gabled breakfront to High Street, the gable being drawn together with a plank screen suggesting half-timbering, and a label-shaped window head bearing the post office name. The window below is a five-sash casement design with windows subdivided in the free-style proportion. In addition the lower panes are each bisected with a horizontal and vertical glazing bar, an unusual detail. To the south of the projecting bay, the interwar-era telephone exchange wing is typical of Queensland post office buildings of the time, with hipped roof, casement sash windows and more austere detailing.

The original post office now houses the post office public and counter areas with the 1920s public area and telephone exchange now converted to the mail room and staff room. The areas were probably refurbished in later years and again when Australia Post standardised its retail areas. Immediately behind the post office, the former four-roomed quarters component has been converted to a Post Master's office, store room, mail room and mail contractor's sorting rooms. The original verandah on the southern side of the building has been converted to storage and staff amenities. The trailing service wing comprising the former servant's room, kitchen and pantry is presently being used for storage and as a bike shed.

=== Original fabric ===
The original fabric of the building which survives includes:

- Structural frame: Timber floor, wall and roof framing on timber pole stumps.
- External walls: Variously straight and chamfered profile timber weatherboard cladding to stud-framed areas indicating various periods of construction; verandah areas have exposed vertical and diagonal studs; the sub-floor spaces are enclosed by vertical timber battens.
- Internal walls: Variously lined with horizontal or vertical beaded and V-jointed timber lining boards; some rooms have expressed hardwood stud frame. Walls to original kitchen range alcove are lined with corrugated galvanised iron.
- Floor: Timber floor boards with moulded timber skirting boards.
- Ceiling: Beaded timber board-lined ceilings with timber quad cornices; circular timber ceiling vent covers.
- Roof: Hipped form with pyramidal form to quarters component; integral verandahs; all clad with corrugated galvanised iron. Timber-lined eaves soffits. Decorative metal ridge ventilators on post office and quarters components. Front gable introduced in 1910–11 works.
- Other: The original side and front elevations have timber-framed double-hung sash windows with two-light sashes and timber reveals.

The 1910 alterations which survive include:

- a front gable with half-timbering, building inscription "BOONAH POST OFFICE" and a five-sash casement window bay to the front elevation
- Timber-framed verandahs integral with main roof and finished with timber balustrade with lattice infill (lattice screens later introduced above balustrade).
- Internal doors which are variously four-panelled timber with glazed operable fanlight over or ledged and braced timber construction.
- Original quarters kitchen with wood-fired range and surrounding walls clad with corrugated galvanised iron
- Grounds originally enclosed by timber picket fence.

=== Condition ===
The original design of Boonah Post Office was a simple, asymmetrically composed porch and gable building with a small postal hall and large quarters component behind. The planning arrangement is assumed to have provided dual but independent operation of the postal and telegraphic functions around the single postal hall and counter with minimal space for mail sorting, telegraphic functions and staff facilities. The key alteration to the building concerns the enlargement and remodelling of the frontal component to provide an enlarged public space and telephone exchange facilities, and later the removal of the telegraphic function.

Notwithstanding the changed pattern of circulation and use, the external presentation of the building is able to demonstrate key aspects of the original design and planning, particularly in relation to the quarters component, and subsequent phases of development, including the hipped and gabled roof form, the raised weatherboarded frontage to the street and various timberwork details. Alterations include the addition of the disabled ramp to the northeast corner, alterations to the south verandah and installation of private letter box bays.

As noted above, the building's original plan form has been altered by the removal of walls throughout the frontal office component, alterations to the south verandah and the demolition of a small lean-to the western end. In general, however, the integrity of the quarters plan form, the reverse timber-boarded construction of the walls (exposed frame with belt rail), boarded ceiling, decorative ceiling vents, and raked bulkheads remains intact, and serve to demonstrate the aesthetic quality and configuration of the original interior spaces.

While altered over a substantial period of time, and despite the use and pattern of circulation being altered in part, Boonah Post Office maintains a reasonable ability to demonstrate the legibility of its original design and manner of construction. Externally and internally the building appears to be in sound condition, well maintained and with no major defects visible.

== Heritage listing ==
The significant components of Boonah Post Office include the evolved postal building and former quarters comprising fabric from the late 19th century fabric through to 1952.

Boonah Post Office was listed on the Australian Commonwealth Heritage List on 8 November 2011 having satisfied the following criteria.

Criterion B: Rarity

In the state context, Boonah Post Office remains as the state's oldest functioning timber post office with a rare relatively intact nineteenth century quarters component. It is also, possibly, the earliest known "Turn of the Century Transitional" type post office, as identified in the Historic Post Offices in Queensland A National Estate Study, 1983.

Criterion D: Characteristic values

Boonah Post Office is an example of:

- a post and telegraph office with quarters (second generation typology 1870–1929)
- a transitional timber form with semi-detached office and bungalow quarters with a later projecting gable.
- the work of the Queensland Government Architect's office under Alfred Barton Brady

Typologically, Boonah Post Office, built between 1893 and 1898, was constructed at the midpoint of a second typology of post offices between 1870 and 1929. These post offices generally incorporated a separate component for the telegraph functions in addition to residential quarters. In this instance, the postmaster's residence was provided in a semi-detached building, allowing enlarged telegraph facilities. The key alteration to the building concerns the enlargement and remodelling of the frontal component to provide an enlarged public space and telephone exchange facilities, and later the removal of the telegraphic function. While the alterations have altered the appearance of the frontal component in particular, the quarters remain largely intact and the overall typology is still readable. In the state context, Boonah is also a member, possibly the earliest example, of a post office type known as T14 (Turn of the Century Transitional) a relatively small number of which were built throughout Queensland during 1896–1900.

Architecturally and stylistically, Boonah Post Office is an amalgam of at least three building programs, but with a core of late nineteenth century characteristics. While the main alterations carried out in 1910–11 introduced a gabled bay, this element was in the mode which had already been in favour since around 1900 and used within the type, as seen at the contemporary types constructed in Esk (1900) and Tambo (1904). While partially altered in plan form and function, it retains the principal aspects of its original compositional detail and fabric. This includes its presentation as a raised timber weatherboard structure with simple decorative detail. The overall composition and aesthetic qualities are generally modest in line with its type, with the timberwork details well executed, if common, including the simple bargeboard, exposed rafter ends, grouped window joinery, half-timbering, and internal ceiling vents.
