= Tully Training Area =

- Location within Queensland
- 17.8413°S 145.8053°E
- Location: Tully-Cardstone Road, Tully, Queensland, Australia

Commonwealth Heritage List
- Official name: Tully Training Area
- Type: Listed place (Natural)
- Designated: 22 June 2004
- Reference no.: 105654

Tully Training Area is a heritage-listed rainforest in a military training area at Tully-Cardstone Road, Tully, Queensland, Australia. It was added to the Australian Commonwealth Heritage List on 22 June 2004.

== Description ==
Tully Training Area is approximately 13,300 hectares (33,000 acres). It is 11 kilometres (6.8 mi) north-west of Tully.

The Tully Military Training Area (TTA) is part of the Wet Tropics biogeographic region, which runs along the coast from the Cedar Bay/Daintree region in the north to just short of Townsville in the south, and includes the elevated Atherton plateau. The regions has high annual rainfall, a warm climate and fertile soils, which provide the ideal conditions for rainforest growth.

The outstanding hydrological feature of the TTA and the surrounding Tully region is its high annual rainfall of about 4,000 millimetres (160 in) that is concentrated within a four-month wet-season period.

The topography of TTA is moderately rugged with steep slopes rising from valley floors to the deeply bisected Walter Hill Range. These valleys lie at around 300 metres (980 ft) elevation at the northern Downey Creek and at 100 metres (330 ft) altitude both in the eastern Liverpool Creek sector, and the broad Jarra Creek in the southern sector of the place. All these valleys rise steeply to around 600 metres (2,000 ft) where remnants of an elevated peneplain surface give way occasionally to higher peaks of around 900 metres (3,000 ft). The places broad valleys contain deep alluvial and colluvial soils derived from a diversity of parent rocks.

The northern Downey Creek sector of the TTA is geologically best described as being a deeply incised upland basalt plateau siting at around 400 metres (1,300 ft), and is flanked by granite and metamorphic ranges on its west and east respectively, and which extend into the southern portions of the place. The basalts were erupted during the Cainozoic era and the lavas flooded and partially filled the South Johnstone River and Downey Creek valleys in the northern part of the place to depths of hundreds of metres. Subsequent erosion has carved a spectacular sheer walled gorge as the South Johnstone River re-asserted its course and the basalts have been deeply weathered and eroded. These basalt flows are part of Atherton basalt province, which extends over an area of 1,800 square kilometres (690 sq mi).

The southern Jarra Creek portion of the TTA is dominated by granitic mountain ranges, which gives way to river alluvium and freshwater swamps to the south. The valley area also includes isolated pockets of basalt.

The Downey and Jarra Creek valleys contain deep alluvium soils, which have been deposited by both stream overflow and by slope wash. The headwater streams of these concave valleys are still in a youthful phase of active down-cutting. The places soils are derived from granite, basalt, or alluvium (stream overflow and slope wash deposits) and colluvium (scree processes). Differences in soil properties are a product of underlying parent material and landscape position.

The main rainforests in the region occur astride three major geomorphic regions: the tablelands of the Great Dividing Range; the lower coastal belt; and the intermediate great escarpment. The TTA holds a significant percentage of the Walter Hill Ranges rainforest block found between Innisfail and Tully, which Wet Tropics Management Authority (WETMA) vegetation mapping reports note appears to be one of the largest areas of continuous virgin forest between Tully and Cairns. These forests occur at altitudes of about 300 metres (980 ft) to over 1,000 metres (3,300 ft).

The Wet Tropics rainforests, of which the TTA are significant component, are recognised as being floristically and structurally the most diverse in Australia. This diversity is related to rainfall, soil type, soil drainage, altitude and the evolutionary history. Tracey and Webb have classified the bioregions rainforests into thirteen major structural types, including two that have sclerophyll emergents and codominants. Seven of these thirteen forest structural types occur within the place. The effect of altitude on the rainforest structure is striking, and is demonstrated by a gradual decrease in species and structural diversity with increasing height.

The Wet Tropics rainforests are internationally and nationally important as a zone of overlap and mixing between the typically Gondwanan-Australian flora and the flora more characteristic of the tropical forests of Asia; a mixing process that is presumed to have occurred following the collision of the Australian plate with the Asian plate about 15 million years ago. These rainforests contain at least 25% of all higher plant genera in an area of rainforest that represents less than 0.1% of Australia's land surface. These rainforests contain one of the most complete and diverse living records of the major stages in the evolution of land plants, from the very first land plants to higher plants (Gymnosperms and Angiosperms).

The TTA and surrounding Walter Hill Range area has in general maintained high habitat values due to the fact that it is located in a protected area (Wet Tropics of Queensland World Heritage Area), has maintained reasonable habitat integrity with suitable structural and species diversity, has good connectivity with other suitable habitat including lowland-highland connectivity, and contains lowland habitats that are locally rare.

The most extensive remnant of Complex Mesophyll Vine Forest (Type 1A) now remaining in virgin condition in the wet tropics is found on the plateau adjacent to the junction of Downey Creek with the South Johnstone River at altitudes of between 300 and 400 metres (980 and 1,310 ft). It is assumed that the Downey Creek area lies near the upper altitudinal limits of Type 1A.

The broad Jarra Creek valley is significant as it contains the largest remaining area of complex vine forest on alluvial soils in the wet tropical lowlands, and is composed of two regionally vulnerable types, Complex Mesophyll Vine Forest (Type 1A) and, Mesophyll Vine Forest with dominant fan palms (Type 3B), which a rainforest type slightly less diverse in species and structure than complex mesophyll vine forest.

Type 1A forest is regarded as representing the optimal development and the most complex of the rainforest types in Australia and is found on fertile soils on very wet and wet lowlands and foothills.

Type 3B Mesophyll Vine Forest with Dominant Palms are found in the very wet lowlands and lower foothills of Jarra Creek and are areas of swamp vegetation dominated by the Fan-leaf Palm (Licuala ramsayi), in areas of seasonally impeded drainage.

Further up the altitudinal gradient (around 400 m and up to 700 m) on the foothill slopes of the TTA's three catchments Mesophyll Vine Forest (type 2A) is found and is the dominant vegetation type of the place, but has been damaged in many places by cyclones This vegetation community also extends up to altitudes up to 800 metres (2,600 ft) at Downey Creek in areas of basalt soils, where fertility is favourable.

On cloudy wet and moist uplands and highlands about the place Simple Notophyll Vine Forest (Type 8) is found (often with Agathis microstachya) and after Type 2A this would be the most significant rainforest type in the place. This community is confined to restricted locations in the highest parts of the place, at elevations above about 600 to 800 metres (2,000 to 2,600 ft).

On the cloudy wet highlands on granite peaks (generally above 800 m) Simple Microphyll Vine-fern Forest (Type 9) is found (also often with Agathis microstachya).

On the highest peaks, and exposed ridges at lower altitudes, there are small areas of Mountain Rock Pavement vegetation (Type 21) which are shrub-sized heathlands recognised by the presence of Lophostemon confertus and Leptospermum species (such L. Wooroonoonan).

Throughout the place in exposed areas affected by wind disturbance, such as ridgelines, pockets of Acacia Aulacocarpa Vine Forests (Type 12A and 12C) are found and are characterised as having tall and closed acacia-dominant canopies with some rain forest species present in the canopy and as a developing understorey. The widespread occurrence of A. Aulacocarpa -dominated communities on these steep exposed slopes would appear to be evidence of a likely "recycling" of this type through wind disturbance.

Another vegetation type affected by wind disturbance at lower altitudes, such as in the Liverpool/McNamee Creek sector of the place, are vinelands, which are open areas dominated by rampant scrambling vines of a number of species, but most prominently Merremia peltata, with occasional emergent trees or clumps of trees.

In the better-drained sites of the TTA, often on steep ridges, pockets of Eucalyptus-dominated Medium open forest (Type 13A) communities are found. Eucalyptus Pellita is commonly the only eucalypt species within the canopy and the ecotone or transition zone between this sclerophyllous forest and surrounding rainforest is recognised as being significant habitat for many mammalian species.

Studies on the fauna of TTA date back to the 1980s when CSIRO conducted coarse level baseline inventories and an Environmental Impact Assessment (EIA) of a number of Defence exercises. More focused faunal studies of key issues have continued until the present (including 5 cassowary and 3 stream dwelling frog surveys).

The extensive clearing of lowland forests in the Tully region has resulted in the lowland forest habitats found within the TTA becoming regionally and locally rare and may explain the high number of rare and threatened fauna species occurring. These include the well-known Cassowary (Casuarius casuarius subsp. Johnsonii) and at least two of the declining stream-dwelling frog species including the Common Mistfrog (Litoria rheocola) and the Lace-eyed Tree Frog (Nyctimystes dayi).

A search of the Environment Australia (Environment Protection and Biodiversity Conservation Act 1999 (EPBC)) Online Database indicates at least twenty-seven nationally threatened species (thirteen fauna species and fourteen flora species) have the potential to occur within the TTA.

Notable nationally threatened fauna species that are highly likely to be found in the TTA in future surveys (as predicted by fauna experts) include: the endangered Yarri or Spotted-tailed Quoll (Dasyurus maculatus Gracilis), especially in rainforest areas above 300 metres (980 ft); the endangered Greater Large-eared Horseshoe Bat Rhinolophus phillipenesis; and the critically endangered Bare-rumped Sheathtail Bat (Saccolaimus Saccolaimus Nudiclunitus).

Other mammal species, which are endemic to the Wet Tropics bioregion and are likely to be found in the TTA (as indicated by bioclimatic modelling by Nix in 1991 and scientific collection records) include: the Green Ringtail Possum Pseudochirops archeri; and at higher altitudes from 550–590 metres (1,800–1,940 ft) both the Herbert Ringtail Possum Pseudocheirus herbertensis and the Lemuroid Ringtail Possum Hemibelidus lemuroides.

=== Condition ===
As assessed in mid-2003, the Tully Military Training Area (TTA) is composed of extensive areas of unlogged rainforest, including the only remaining significant area of virgin Complex Mesophyll Vine Forest (Type 1A) forest on basalt in the Downey Creek area.

The TTA also contains other significant unlogged rainforest communities including a large area in the catchment of South Liverpool Creek and on the slopes of the Walter Hill Ranges, which surround the Downey and Jarra Creek valleys. Most of the forest mapped as undisturbed in this area has been recorded as Mesophyll Vine Forest (Type 2A), with relatively small areas of Notophyll Vine Forest (Type 8).

Other areas in the TTA have also been historically impacted by selective logging operations, including large block of Complex Mesophyll Vine Forest (type 1A) on alluvium along the Jarra Creek valley. Despite these historic impacts this block is of conservation significance as it is the largest remaining area of complex mesophyll vine forest on alluvium within the Wet Tropics biogeographic region. In addition small areas of Complex Mesophyll Vine Forest on rocky basalt slopes remain on hills adjacent to Jarra Creek.

The Department of Defence has managed the TTA over past 20 years has and used the area for jungle training. The TTA is currently managed under an Environmental Management Plan (EMP), developed in 1997, that is consistent with the protection of Wet Tropics of Queensland World Heritage values. Since the declaration of the World Heritage listing in 1988, both intensity of use and range of training activities have been scaled down (training courses reduced by approximately 50 percent). Current Defence activities include infantry training (patrolling and bivouacking) and live fire training. Recent studies indicate these activities have little impact on the rainforest communities other than localised impacts in the live firing areas and that the quality of the lowland rainforest remains of high integrity. TTA is the only Defence area suitable for close-quarters jungle live firing training.

Specific Defence management actions include standing orders covering movement, "no go" areas, vehicle speed, and logging of cassowary sightings. The Wet Tropics Management Authority (WETMA) does not consider the current Defence activities as a major threat; however an activity-based Environmental Impact Assessment (EIA) and a Land Management Strategy (LMS) are currently being prepared in consultation with WETMA to review the EMP strategies and determine whether these are adequate. These EIA and LMS studies draw upon the substantial amount of knowledge accumulated over the past two decades both from within the TTA, and the wider area, and recent studies of key faunal issues including five cassowary and three stream dwelling frog surveys.

Natural processes have also impacted areas of the TTA and wind exposed areas, such as ridgelines and steep slopes, exhibit broken canopies and Acacia Aulacocarpa individual trees. Disturbance is thought be chiefly related to periodic extreme winds events and the centre of a severe cyclone (Cyclone Winifred) passed through Downey and Liverpool Creek areas in February 1986, causing severe defoliation and uprooting areas of forest.

In the better-drained sites of the TTA, often on steep ridges, pockets of Eucalyptus Pellita-dominated Medium Open Forest (Type 13A) communities are found. E. Pellita is commonly the only eucalypt species within the canopy and the condition of the sclerophyll forests in the Tully River valley, is of interest, as under present trends, this will be the main sclerophyll community remaining on the regional area in the near future. Universally this forest is trending towards vine forest, and there is no evidence of any current fire regime, which could potentially arrest this trend.

The maintenance of the Jarra Creek sectors vegetation is also important in maintaining the water and riparian habitat quality as the surrounding natural vegetation in the Tully River valley is approaching almost total destruction and historically this area contained the largest complex of lowland habitats of the Wet Tropics Region. The radical alteration of the hydrological regime by an ever-expanding drain network has left the Tully River as one of the most significantly impacted of all streams of the Wet Tropics Region. It is now a stream subject to bank erosion and bed sedimentation of an extreme nature, and its seasonal flow patterns have been permanently altered by an increased rate of wet season runoff, diminished dry season flows, and imposed upon that, a fluctuating flow regime and influenced by the pattern of release of water from the Koombooloomba Dam.

== Heritage listing ==
The Commonwealth's Tully Training Area (TTA) is the most significant rainforest area in the Wet Tropics biogeographic region. The TTA is wholly contained within the Wet Tropics of Queensland World Heritage (WH) Area. It was inscribed on the WH list in 1988 against four natural heritage criteria. Values found in TTA include seven of the thirteen major structural types contained in the Wet Tropics WH Area.

The place is important as rainforest refugia providing essential protection for the plant and animal species of the rainforest during the drier climatic extremes of the many ice age maximums of the last 1.8 Million years. Gondwanan relicts, such the bowerbird family and the most primitive member of the kangaroo-family, the Musky rat kangaroo, are found in the place.

Complex Mesophyll Vine Forest on basalt or alluvium in the Wet Tropics is the optimal development of rainforest in Australia due to the favourable conditions of climate and fertile soil. The TTA contains the largest remaining areas of unlogged Complex Mesophyll Vine Forest on basalt or alluvium in the wet tropical lowlands.

The TTA also contains the largest remaining areas of Mesophyll Vine Forest with Palms on alluvium in the wet tropical lowlands and a large area of unlogged Mesophyll Vine Forest, both of which are rainforest types slightly less diverse in species and structure than Complex Mesophyll Vine Forest.

This complex rainforest community, together with the adjoining rainforest and sclerophyll forest types, ensure that the TTA is a dynamic and complex ecosystem. These rainforests are significant as the lowland and coastal range rainforests of the Wet Tropics region have been almost completely cleared for agriculture and urban development. The TTA is one of three population strongholds of the nationally endangered Cassowary. Cassowaries are significant in that many rainforest plant species are dependent on the Cassowary for seed dispersal and thus the ongoing maintenance of the rainforest.

The TTA acts as a transition zone from montane to coastal environments and provides an important ecological function enabling migration of fauna and exchange of genes and species.

The area is home to the deeply incised South Johnstone River valley and has a backdrop of the ranges when viewed from the coast.

It is possible that additional cultural heritage values exist within the area that are yet to be identified, documented or assessed for National Estate significance by the Australian Heritage Commission.

Tully Training Area was listed on the Australian Commonwealth Heritage List on 22 June 2004 having satisfied the following criteria.

Criterion A: Processes

The TTA is significant component of the Walter Hill Ranges rainforest area, which is largest remaining lowland rainforest area in the Wet Tropical forest region between Cairns and Townsville. As the TTA contains large areas of diverse lowland and coastal ranges rainforest it is highly significant in maintaining natural processes both at the national and bioregional scale. Particular vegetation communities within of the TTA which are significant in maintaining existing processes of rainforest ecology include:

The most extensive remnants of Complex Mesophyll Vine Forest (CMVF) on basalt and alluvium now remaining in virgin/unlogged condition in the Wet Tropics region. CMVF forest on basalt is the optimum development of rainforest in Australia due to the most favourable conditions of climate and fertile soil found in the tropical humid lowlands.

The remaining rainforest communities within the TTA also of outstanding importance from a conservation view-point, the key assets are the large area of virgin Mesophyll Vine Forest (MVF) and Mesophyll Vine Forest (MFPVF) with dominant fan palms.

TTA contains extensive areas of rainforest, vine-thicket and eucalypt communities, which are important for maintaining regional populations of cassowaries, birds, frogs, and mammals. The cassowary is important for the dispersal of many rainforest plant species and thus the maintenance of plant pattern in the forest.

The TTA's Jarra Creek is one of the highest conservation value waterways in the Wet Tropics bioregion, due primarily to the large extent of lowland rainforest within the TTA. As it provides important habitat for the conservation of diverse freshwater fish and stream-dwelling frog species.

Criterion B: Rarity

The place has at least three nationally endangered fauna species including:

- Lace-eyed Tree Frog (Nyctimystes dayi)
- Common Mistfrog (Litoria rheocola)
- Southern Cassowary (Casuarius casuarius johnstonii)

The place has at least one nationally vulnerable fauna species:

- Spectacled Flying-fox (Pteropus conspicillatus)

The place has at least two nationally vulnerable flora species including:

- Canarium acutifolium var. acutifolium
- Layered Tassell Fern Huperzia phlegmarioides

The place has at least one fauna species listed as endangered in Queensland:

- Southern Cassowary

The place has at least one flora species listed as endangered in Queensland:

- Costus potierae

The place has at least two flora species listed as vulnerable in Queensland including:

- Canarium acutifolium var. acutifolium
- Layered Tassell Fern Huperzia phlegmarioides

The place has at least four flora species listed as rare in Queensland including:

- Asplenium excisum Haplostichanthus sp.
- Pseuduvaria villosa Rourea brachyandra

Queensland Herbarium 1:100,000 scale mapping shows the occurrence of two Endangered Regional Ecosystems:

- Complex mesophyll vine forest on very well drained fertile lowland alluvial soils (equivalent to Tracey and Webb Type 1A)
- Complex mesophyll riparian vine forest on moist and dry well drained lowland alluvial levees (equivalent to Tracey and Webb Type 3B)

This mapping also shows one Of Concern Regional Ecosystem:

- Complex mesophyll vine forest on very wet well drained basalt lowlands (equivalent to Tracey and Webb Type 1A).

Criterion C: Research

The TTA is an important research site. Studies conducted over the last three decades by CSIRO have included:

- The ecological processes and mechanisms of revegetation after disturbance of lowland rainforest
- C14 radiocarbon dating of charcoal deposits revealing the palaeoclimate and rainforest/eucalyptus dynamics in North Queensland from the last glacial maximum to recent times (27000 years to 3500 years before present). Charcoal dating is significant tool to provide independent correlation of palynological and sedimentary evidence.
- Rainforest and eucalyptus community dynamics determined by fire.

Tracey described in his 1982 publication, a profile description of the unlogged Complex Mesophyll Vine Forest (CMVF) forest at Downey Creek, which falls within the TTA

Criterion D: Characteristic values

The TTA is recognised as representing the most significant remaining rainforest area of the Wet Tropics World Heritage management area as it contains both the largest remnants of at least two lowland rainforest communities, and as it is a significant component of the largest lowland rainforest block in the Wet Tropical forest region between Cairns and Townsville. As such is important in demonstrating principle characteristics of the range of ecosystems present in lowland rainforests.

Criterion E: Aesthetic characteristics

The South and North Johnstone Rivers feature notable natural scenery, considered a key landscape asset within the World Heritage area.

In the Scenic Resource Evaluation of the Wet Tropics World Heritage Area report, the TTA area (Jarra Creek and Impact Area sectors) is listed as being of high scenic significance due to its continuity with the adjoining ranges and the backdrop it provides to coastal plain views.
