= Horace Mackennal =

Australian architect

Horace John Mackennal (1875-1949) was an Australian architect.

He was educated at King's School in Fitzroy and the University of Melbourne. He worked as a draftsman in the office of the Melbourne and Metropolitan Board of Works before joining the Commonwealth public service in 1902. He worked as chief draftsman in the office of the Commonwealth Works Director for Victoria before himself being made director in 1914, following some months acting in the role. He served as Commonwealth Works Director for Victoria until 1940, during which time he oversaw the development of many significant public works projects. He later worked for the Department of Munitions during World War II as munitions liaison officer.

Buildings directly attributed to Mackennal include a number of post offices, first a group in Victoria before WW1 including Canterbury Post Office, South Melbourne Post Office (1912), Windsor Post Office (1908), and the Woodend Post Office (1905), then some in Queensland in the 1930s, including Ingham Post Office, and Bowen Post Office. Also in the 1930s, he designed the addition of a second floor to the old High Court of Australia building in Melbourne, and the officers mess of Victoria Barracks, Melbourne. As Director of the Victorian division, he oversaw numerous projects, including the Mail Exchange Building (1913), the series of Drill Halls designed by George H Hallendal in the 1930s, such the Royal Melbourne Regiment Infantry Company Drill Hall, Victoria Street in the City, the Albert Park Signals Corps Drill Hall, and the Fitzroy Drill Hall, as well as the Repatriation Commission Outpatient Clinic in Melbourne, and the officers mess at RAAF Laverton.

He died in 1949 and was cremated at Springvale Crematorium.

He married Agnes E. Thomas on 16 October 1901. They had two sons.

His father John Simpson Mackennal and brother Bertram Mackennal were both influential sculptors.
