= Ayr Post Office =

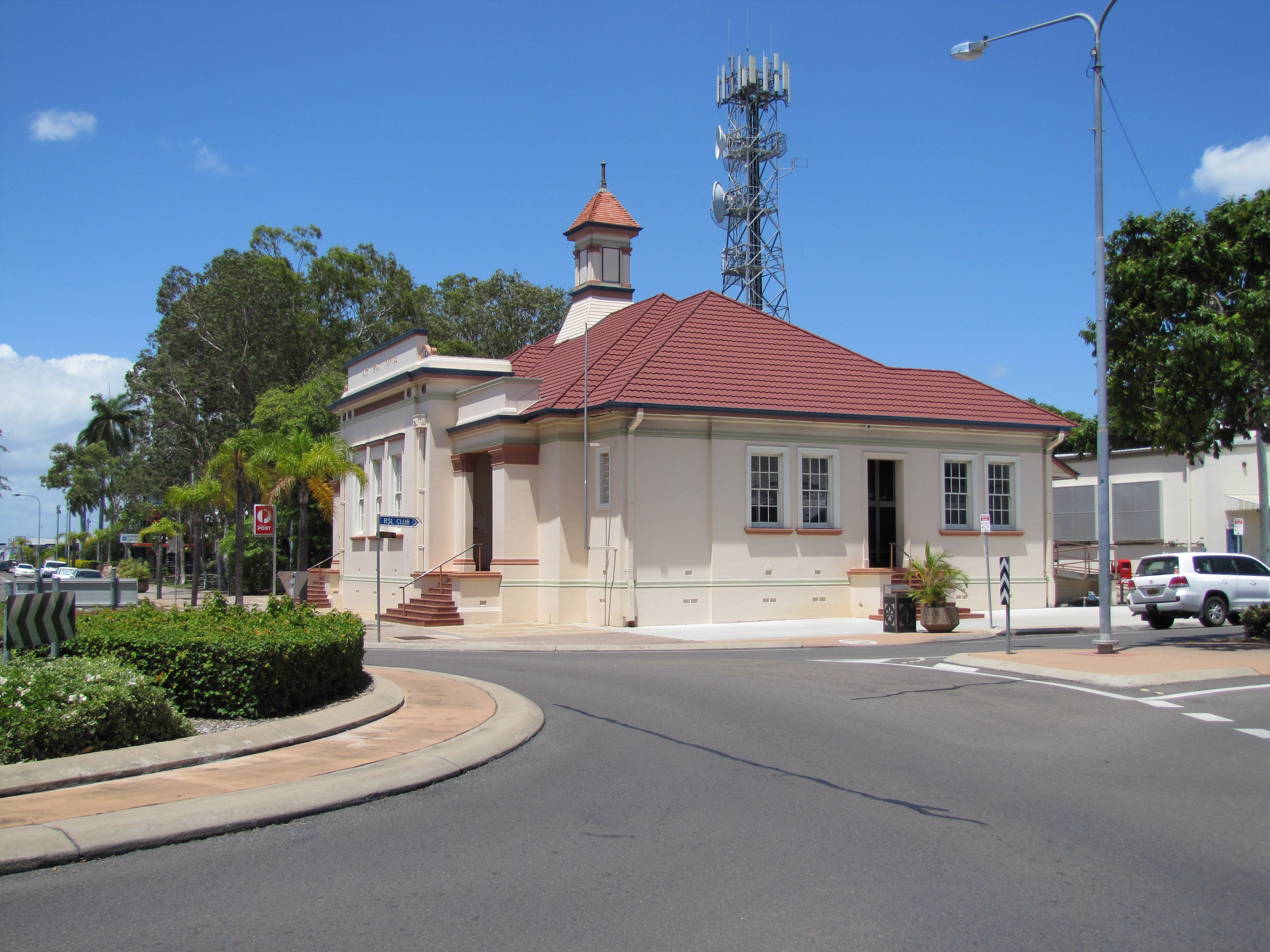
- Ayr Post Office, 2014

- Location within Queensland
- 19.5762°S 147.4047°E
- Location: 155 Queen Street, Ayr, Shire of Burdekin, Queensland, Australia

History
- Built: 1936
- Built for: Postmaster General of Australia

Site notes
- Architect: Commonwealth Department of the Interior
- Owner: Australia Post

Commonwealth Heritage List
- Official name: Ayr Post Office
- Type: Listed place (Historic)
- Designated: 22 August 2012
- Reference no.: 106172

Ayr Post Office is a heritage-listed post office at 155 Queen Street, Ayr, Shire of Burdekin, Queensland, Australia. It was designed by the Commonwealth Department of Interior and was built in 1936. It was added to the Australian Commonwealth Heritage List on 22 August 2012.

== History ==
European graziers raising sheep and cattle in the interior of North Queensland settled the Burdekin River district in the 1860s. The first commercial crop of sugar was produced in 1881 and assured the manufacturing strength of the region. The township of Ayr was laid out in 1882, intended as the centre for the region. Reserves were set aside for administrative and government purposes, including the court house, police station and post and telegraph office.

In 1884, James Palmer constructed the first post office and residence to a design by John James Clark, then the Colonial Government Architect in Queensland's Public Works Office. The first postmaster was Thomas Bishop who lived in the separate quarters neighbouring the post office on the south side. In the 1930s, the earlier post office and residence were replaced by the current building, after the Burdekin Shire Chairman led a deputation to the Australian Postmaster General's Office requesting a more adequate building. On 21 April 1934, the Prime Minister Joseph Lyons announced that plans for the new Ayr Post Office had been completed and was expected to cost about £7,000 to construct.

Ayr Post Office was designed by the Commonwealth Department of Interior, which took over responsibility for constructing post offices in Queensland in c. 1921–23. The building occupied the site of the previous post office. Separate quarters were again provided on the south side (but have since been removed). It was completed in 1936

== Description ==
Ayr Post Office is at 155 Queen Street, corner Young Street (formerly Bey Street), Ayr, comprising the whole of Lot 1 RP742482.

Queen Street is Ayr's main street and part of the Bruce Highway. It is part of a civic precinct with the community centre, courts and police station, the council offices and nearby Country Women's Association building. A war memorial and clock lantern on the adjacent traffic roundabout enhances the setting to the building, including the corner landmark intersection. Further north, Queen Street has been upgraded including the erection of a steel-framed shade structure along the length of the median strip. The street is flanked by single storey commercial buildings and shops.

The post office site is rectilinear in plan and bound by a chain wire fence. A gravel driveway along the west boundary divides the post office from the neighbouring telephone exchange and provides access to the loading dock subsequently built at the rear of the building. A concrete block hipped roof storage shed has been built in the southwest corner of the site.

The post office is near symmetrical on its entry frontage to Queen Street comprising twin corner porches which flank the parapeted postal hall, but is otherwise asymmetrical to the side and rear elevations. It reproduces several of the "Georgian" details of the former quarters (designed by John James Clark), including the pattern of windows. In the manner of smaller Commonwealth-designed post offices of this period, the frontage is parapeted with three tall windows across the postal hall, and with differing windows behind the two entries on either side. Blocks of steps provide access from street level framed by brick piers with rendered capping.

The hipped roof is symmetrical about the post office breakfront, but the flanking hip and the figuring of the rear eaves for the main hip are irregular, including from the entrance elevation. The composition plays off a centralising postal hall wing and prominent roof lantern with flanking roof eaves of irregularly varying heights. Overall, it is delineated as an institutional building but retains the small, quasi-residential character that marked post office designs during the 1900–1914 period.

Entry to the central retail shop is via the original side porches and steps. The north wing and Young Street entry have been altered by the removal of walls and the installation of a post office box lobby which extends along the length of the elevation. The lobby exits through an opening formed in the west wall and onto a disabled ramp at the rear. Post office boxes have been added to the south porch and the west end of the side south porch infilled to house the air-conditioning plant.

Internally, the building has three main sections relating to the front retail shop counter area and the L-shaped mail sorting room behind it; the lunch room, store, strong room and office along the south; and the enclosure of the former verandah along the west to provide (south to north) a cleaner's room, lockers, toilets, loading dock, night mail and contractor's rooms.

The original planning of Ayr Post Office comprised a symmetrically composed twin porch with a central break-fronted and pedimented postal hall. The planning arrangement provided dual but independent operation of the postal and telegraphic functions around the central postal hall. The inner walls of the south and side porch have been fitted with private boxes. The north porch had two telephone booths at the corner and its west wall had two counter windows and a pay hatch to the exchange. The public postal area while small, contained a counter and writing slope along the front (east) window wall; behind this, the open mailroom extended across the building width at the rear. Original documentation indicates that the north section of the building accommodated the telegraphic functions. Entered separately off Young Street, an L-shaped passage provided access to the mechanics room, store, phonogram and the exchange which was partitioned with half glazed screens. A mail verandah extended across the full width of the building at the rear (west).

The majority of internal walls associated with the exchange areas along the north of the building have been removed to accommodate the external post office box lobby. At the rear, the former verandah has been infilled and subdivided as staff amenities; the central loading dock has been enlarged by the addition of a steel-framed structure. The south end of the former mailroom has also been subdivided for administrative use and to facilitate ducting from the mechanical plantroom installed in the former side porch. The mailroom has been further decreased in sized by the enlargement of the retail shop which extends into the central third of the area along the east and the post office boxes along the north. The original counter and writing slope has been removed and the retail area refurbished with standard Australia Post livery.

Notwithstanding the changed pattern of circulation and use, the external presentation of the building is able to demonstrate aspects of the original design including the parapet frontage, hipped roof form, smooth rendered finish and stylised mouldings. The main alterations to the exterior concern the enclosure of the rear mail verandah, the addition of a door and awning over the rear disabled ramp, the service and loading dock additions and the installation of the plant room in the side porch. Internally, much of the original fabric and detailing associated with key areas has been altered or removed including the suite of rooms associated with the exchange along the north, and the central post hall at the front. The installation of partitions has impacted on the former open areas associated with the mailroom and rear verandah.

The enlargement of the Australia Post retail shop and the installation of shelving conceal the front window wall and disrupt the general sense of enclosure. A number of original openings have also been infilled.

Key elements relating to the external building fabric are:

- Original composition of a central parapeted breakfront to Queen Street flanked by corner side porches with integrally designed steps and building entries
- Original steps and entry to Young Street
- Central fleche and ventilator shaft

=== Condition ===
Externally and internally the building is in relatively sound condition, well maintained and with no major defects visible. The installation of acoustic tile generally conceals the extent of original finishes associated with the ceiling vents.

=== Original fabric ===
Original fabric of the building which survives includes:

- Structural frame: Load-bearing masonry construction on brick piers with timber floor and roof framing. Concrete floor areas to corner and side porches areas and former staff lavatories in the southwest corner.
- External walls: Painted stucco rendered walls with a moulded string line to the ground floor level and a moulded cornice which encircles the building. Window openings have moulded cement surrounds and projecting sills. Smaller corner openings have decorative metal screens in a diamond pattern.
- Internal walls: Generally hard rendered walls with recessed (struck) dado line and curtain rails. Door openings have painted moulded architraves with a number of 4-panel doors and operable glazed highlights over intact. Perimeter windows have double hung multi-pane sashes.
- Floor: Timber boarded floor generally with moulded timber skirting boards, subsequently lined with carpet and vinyl. Concrete slab porch areas and steps subsequently resurfaced with quarry tiles.
- Ceiling: Fibrous plaster strapped ceilings with moulded cornices generally replaced/concealed with plasterboard acoustic tiles. Corner porch ceilings have strapped plaster ceilings and moulded cornices although the south porch has been relined with plasterboard. Ceiling area associated with rear verandah is raked in profile and lined with strapped masonite/asbestos sheet.
- Roof: Hipped roof is timber-framed originally lined with shingles and subsequently reclad with metal sheet impressed in a tiled pattern. Eaves soffits are lined and strapped and rainwater goods include decorative rainwater heads either side of the central front windows.
- Front building inscription "AYR POST OFFICE".
- Fleche clad in copper, shingles, rusticated diamond render and weatherboards and formerly housing a Malley's patent 18" ventilator shafts to vents in the mailroom [refer to NAA architectural documentation].
- Timber slats to enclose the sub-floor area.

== Heritage listing ==
Ayr Post Office was listed on the Australian Commonwealth Heritage List on 22 August 2012 having satisfied the following criteria.

Criterion A: Processes

Ayr Post Office, built in 1936, is one of many smaller post offices designed and built throughout Queensland in the interwar period to service towns and regional centres. While the building is not the original post and telegraph office (constructed in 1884), and is not associated with the earliest development of the Burdekin area, it is significant for its association with the local civic precinct which includes the community centre, courts and police station, council offices, and Country Women's Association building. The war memorial and clock lantern on the adjacent traffic roundabout complement the historic context and setting for the building. The relative degree of external intactness and overall heritage character of the building also enhance this value.

Criterion D: Characteristic values

Ayr Post Office is an example of:

- Retail post office typology (third generation 1930–1974)
- Interwar c.1915–1942 Georgian Revival
- work of the Commonwealth Department of the Interior (H Mackennal)

Typologically, Ayr Post Office, built in 1936, is an example of a third generation retail post office. This generation of typologies demonstrate an emergent retail function in postal operations, separation of the telephone exchange area and increased requirements for larger post office box lobby areas with independent access and serviced by a frontally positioned mail sorting room and/or a rear-loading yard. These aspects are evident in the original design to the extent it comprised a symmetrically composed twin porch arrangement, with a central breakfront postal hall to Queen Street. Telegraph and postal services operated independently either side: the south and side porches were fitted with private boxes and the north porch had telephone booths and windows and pay hatch to the exchange. Subsequently, the exchange areas along the north of the building have been replaced by a post office box lobby, the central retail function has been enlarged and the mailroom subdivided. These works have had limited impact on the external presentation of the building, but have impacted on the internal planning and related typological aspects.

Stylistically, the building's Neo-Georgian Revival front is conservative and limited to threedimensional massing, symmetry and low-relief decoration. It is considered to be a late application of the style, albeit neat, logically detailed, and comparatively intact externally (in terms of the main presentation). The post office design is also carried over from the suburban post offices of the 1910s and a later series of 1920s timber post offices, and is a late example of colonial revivalism in a small public building, combining a monumentalising breakfront around the postal hall in a tradition which dates from earlier post offices of c.1910–30. The Colonial Revival exterior texture had been employed on public buildings in Queensland from around 1910.

While acknowledging the conservative design of the building, Ayr Post Office is relatively intact externally, has neatly executed detailing, and a pleasing symmetrical form; it is considered to reach CHL threshold for this value.

Criterion E: Aesthetic characteristics

Ayr Post Office is a domestically scaled building with dual street frontages and some landmark qualities. These are principally due to its parapeted breakfront to Queen Street, corner side porches and highly visible fleche/roof lantern. The aesthetic and landmark qualities also derive from the building's proximity to the prominent war memorial and clock lantern located on the traffic roundabout in front of the building. The building is also part of a valued local civic precinct. Further, the post office, including the war memorial, features in tourism and promotional material for the town again emphasising its aesthetic/landmark importance.

Criterion G: Social value

The social value of Ayr Post Office, which has provided continuous postal services for over seventy years, is enhanced by its landmark siting and prominent position within the local civic precinct. The building is also part of a valued local civic precinct. The social significance of the post office is additionally demonstrated in it being included, together with the war memorial, in tourism and promotional material for the town.
