= Commonwealth Heritage List =

Federal Australian heritage list

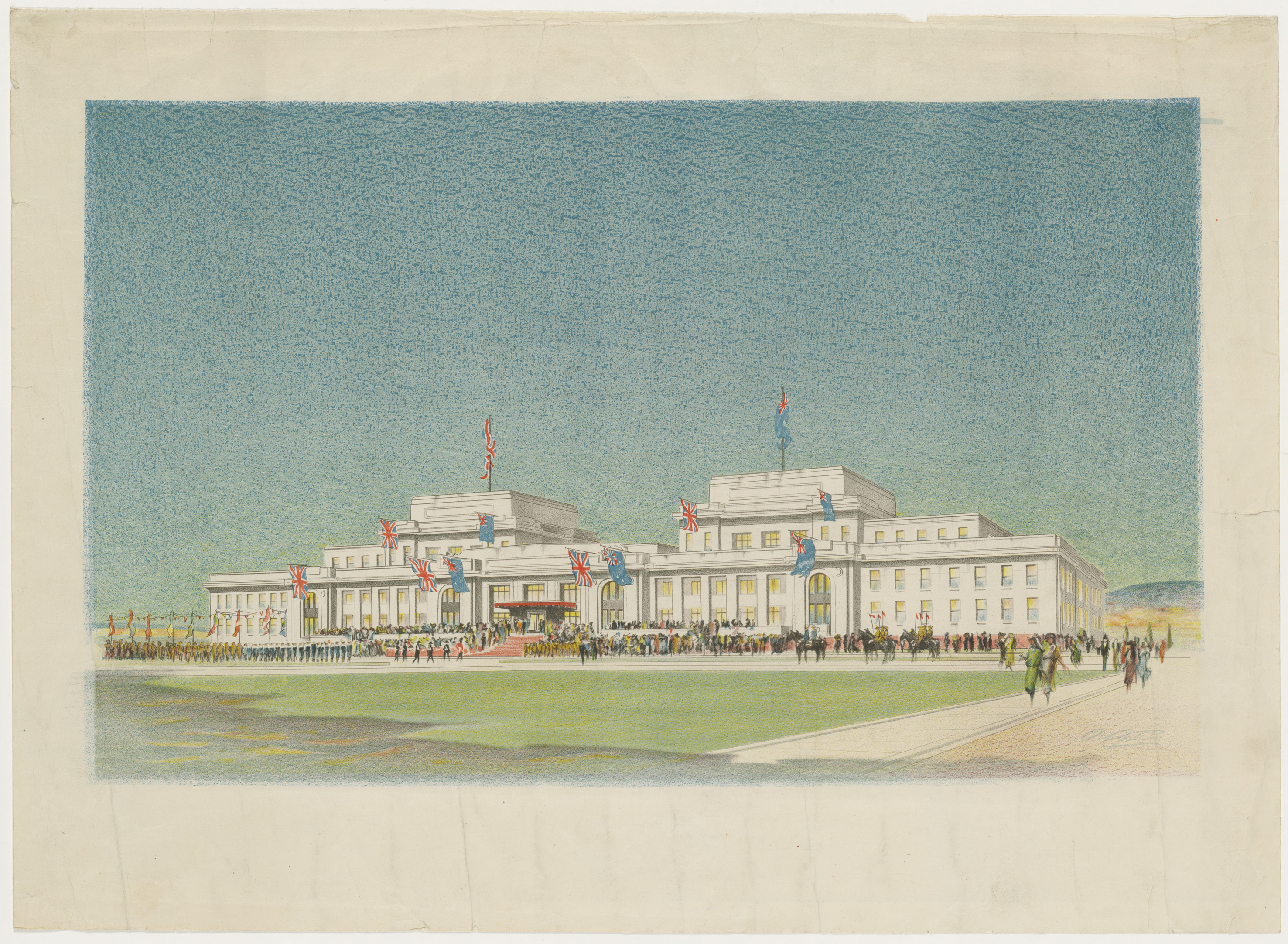
- A copy of the commemorative picture to mark the opening of the first Commonwealth Parliament at Old Parliament House, on 9 May 1927.

Agency overview
- Formed: 2003
- Preceding agency: Register of the National Estate
- Type: Heritage register of natural, historic and indigenous places that are owned by the Commonwealth of Australia

The Commonwealth Heritage List is a heritage register established in 2003, which lists places under the control of the Australian government, on land or in waters directly owned by the Crown (in Australia, the Crown in right of the Commonwealth of Australia). Such places must have importance in relation to the natural or historic heritage of Australia, including those of cultural significance to Indigenous Australians. National heritage sites on the list are protected by the Environment Protection and Biodiversity Conservation Act 1999 (EPBC Act).

The Commonwealth Heritage List, together with the Australian National Heritage List, replaced the former Register of the National Estate in 2003. Under the EPBC Act, the National Heritage List includes places of outstanding heritage value to the nation, and the Commonwealth Heritage List includes heritage places owned or controlled by the Commonwealth.

Places protected under the Act include federally owned telegraph stations, defence sites, migration centres, customs houses, lighthouses, national institutions such as Parliament and High Court buildings, memorials, islands and marine areas.

All places on this list can be found on the online Australian Heritage Database, along with other places on other Australian and world heritage listings.

== History ==
In 2004, a new heritage management system was introduced by the Australian Government to protect Australia’s heritage places. Key elements are amendments to the Environment Protection and Biodiversity Conservation Act 1999 (Cwth), which include explicit requirements for cultural heritage protection, the creation of an Australian National Heritage List and a Commonwealth Heritage List and the establishment of the Australian Heritage Council under the Australian Heritage Council Act 2003. The Register of the National Estate was retained but lost its statutory power.

The National Heritage List is to include a small number of places of outstanding heritage significance to Australia.

== Criteria ==
The Commonwealth Heritage criteria for a place are any or all of the following:

(a) the place has significant heritage value because of the place's importance in the course, or pattern, of Australia's natural or cultural history

(b) the place has significant heritage value because of the place's possession of uncommon, rare or endangered aspects of Australia's natural or cultural history

(c) the place has significant heritage value because of the place's potential to yield information that will contribute to an understanding of Australia's natural or cultural history

(d) the place has significant heritage value because of the place's importance in demonstrating the principal characteristics of:

(i) a class of Australia's natural or cultural places; or

(ii) a class of Australia's natural or cultural environments;

(e) the place has significant heritage value because of the place's importance in exhibiting particular aesthetic characteristics valued by a community or cultural group;

(f) the place has significant heritage value because of the place's importance in demonstrating a high degree of creative or technical achievement at a particular period;

(g) the place has significant heritage value because of the place's strong or special association with a particular community or cultural group for social, cultural or spiritual reasons;

(h) the place has significant heritage value because of the place's special association with the life or works of a person, or group of persons, of importance in Australia's natural or cultural history;

(i) the place has significant heritage value because of the place's importance as part of Indigenous tradition.

== Composition ==
As of 7 January 2025, the Commonwealth Heritage List comprised 384 heritage places as follows:

State/territory	Number of places	List of places
Australian Capital Territory (including Jervis Bay Territory)	83	List for the ACT and JBT
New South Wales	129	
Northern Territory	12	
Queensland	30	List for Queensland
South Australia	10	
Tasmania	18	
Victoria	39	
Western Australia	19	List for Western Australia
External territories	43	
Overseas	2	

== See also ==
- Cultural heritage
- Natural heritage
- Commonwealth Heritage
