= Enoggera Memorial Hall =

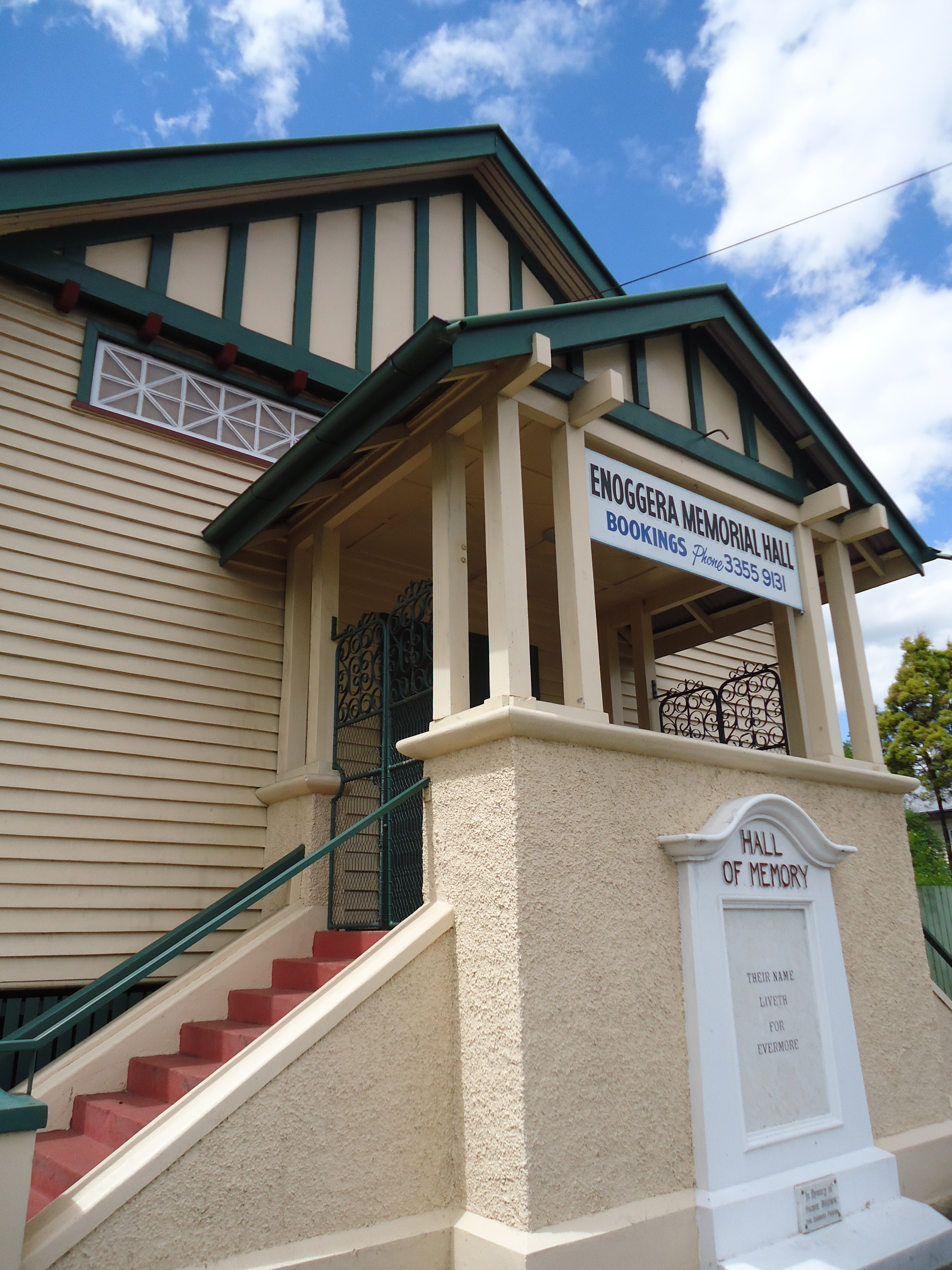
- Enoggera Memorial Hall

- Location within Queensland
- 27.4219°S 152.9911°E
- Location: 349 Wardell Street, Enoggera, City of Brisbane, Queensland, Australia

History
- Design period: Interwar (1919–1939)
- Built: 1871, 1925

Site notes
- Architect: Thomas Pye (1925)

Brisbane Heritage Register
- Official name: Enoggera Memorial Hall
- Reference no.: 615
- Categories: Education – State School; Culture – School of Arts: Culture – Public Venue
- Builders: Mr Lewis of the Pimlico Shops (1871), A. Woollam and Sons of Wilston (1925)

The Enoggera Memorial Hall, formerly the Enoggera Memorial Hall and School of Arts, is World War I memorial hall at 349 Wardell Street, Enoggera, City of Brisbane, Queensland, Australia. It currently houses the historical collection of the Enoggera and Districts Historical Society and is otherwise used as a hall for hire. The building was designed by former Queensland Government Architect, Colonel Thomas Pye, and was opened in November 1925. It is listed on the Brisbane Heritage Register.

== History ==
The building had been used for three different purposes over time.

=== Enoggera State School ===
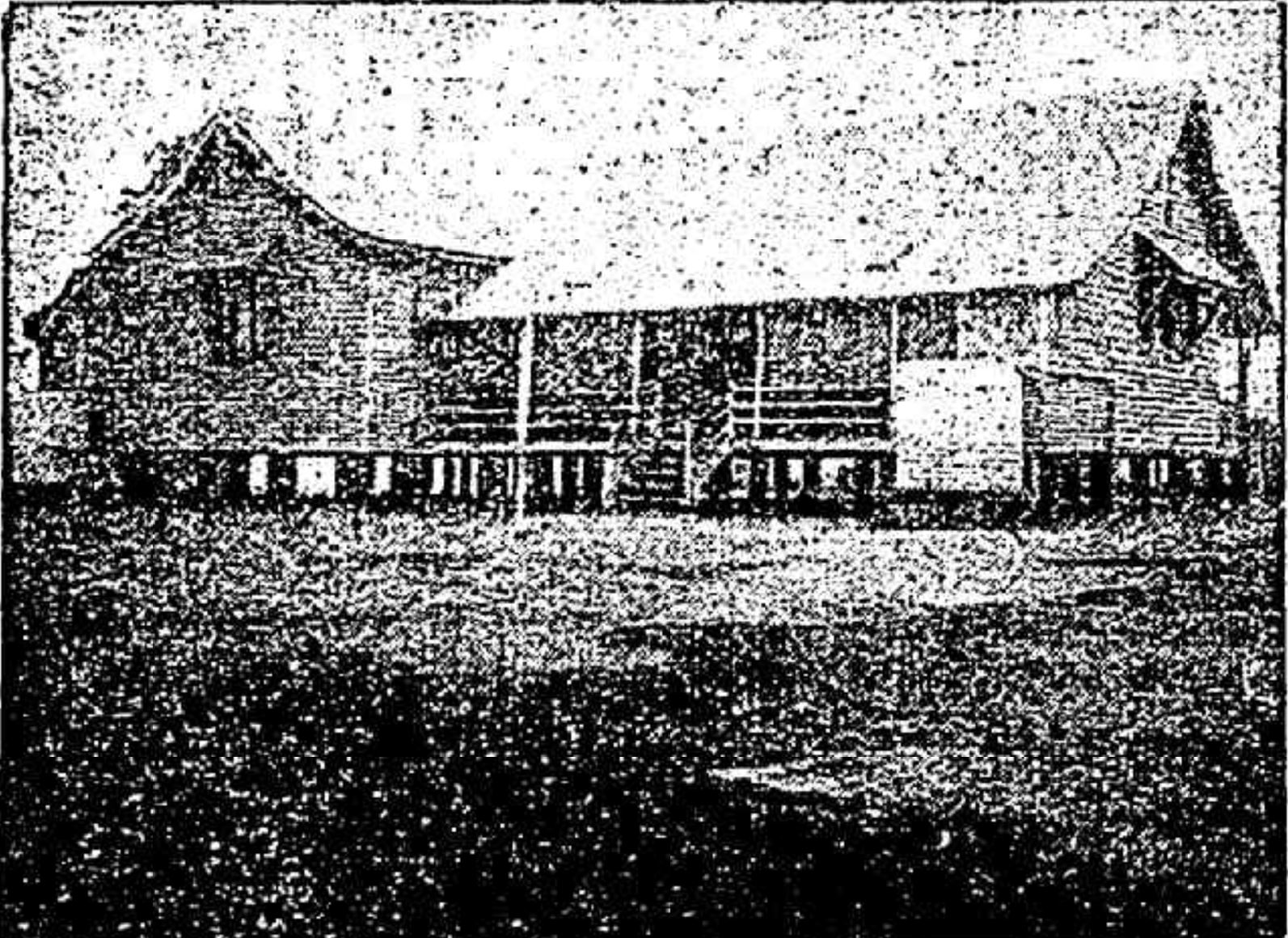
Enoggera State School building, 1917, prior to relocation to the present site

On 5 September 1870, a public meeting was held at the Enoggera Hotel to initiate the establishment of a school for the area. The meeting raised £50 towards that goal (in that time, local communities had to raise part of the cost of the school). In April 1871, having raised £60, members of the local committee approached Randal MacDonnell, the General Inspector of Schools for the Queensland Government, about establishing a national school. MacDonnell advised them a further £10 would be required which the committee promised to provide. Tenders were called for the construction of a school building and a teacher's residence in early May 1871. The building was completed by August 1871 at a cost of £287 by Mr Lewis of the Pimlico Shops with an official opening by Charles Lilley in the presence of 170 people on 24 August 1871. The school commenced classes on Monday 4 September 1871 under headmaster John Towell.

When opened, the school was described as:

"... substantially constructed of hardwood, is 40 foot long by 20 wide, and has a spacious verandah. It is lofty, and admirably lighted, and ventilated by about twenty good-sized windows. It is supplied with all the usual requisites for an establishment of the kind. At the rear of the school is a neat verandah cottage of four rooms, intended as a residence for the teacher. A brick and cement tank of about 9000 gallons capacity, with a suitable pump, has also been constructed ..."

In 1916, due to growth in student numbers, a new building was constructed for the school. At the official opening of the new school building on Saturday 7 October 1916, William Field Lloyd, the Member of the Queensland Legislative Assembly for Enoggera suggested should be converted into a School of Arts (mechanics' institute), a facility needed in the area.

=== Enoggera School of Arts ===
In November 1916 the Department of Public Instruction agree to offer the original Enoggera State School building for use as a School of Arts, an offer that was accepted at a public meeting on Thursday 16 November 1916. The School of Arts officially opened on Saturday 17 February 1917 by William Field Lloyd with at least 150 books in the library and a selection of magazines and newspapers were provided. Although an annual adult subscription cost 10 shillings, members of the Australian Imperial Force at the nearby army camp at Enoggera were given free admission and returned servicemen in the district received free membership.

In July 1920, it was first proposed to relocate and enlarge the Schools of Arts. By December 1921, the plan was to relocate and enlarge the School of Arts as the first stage of constructing a memorial hall for those killed in World War I, which gained the support of the School of Arts committee in February 1922.

=== Enoggera Memorial Hall ===
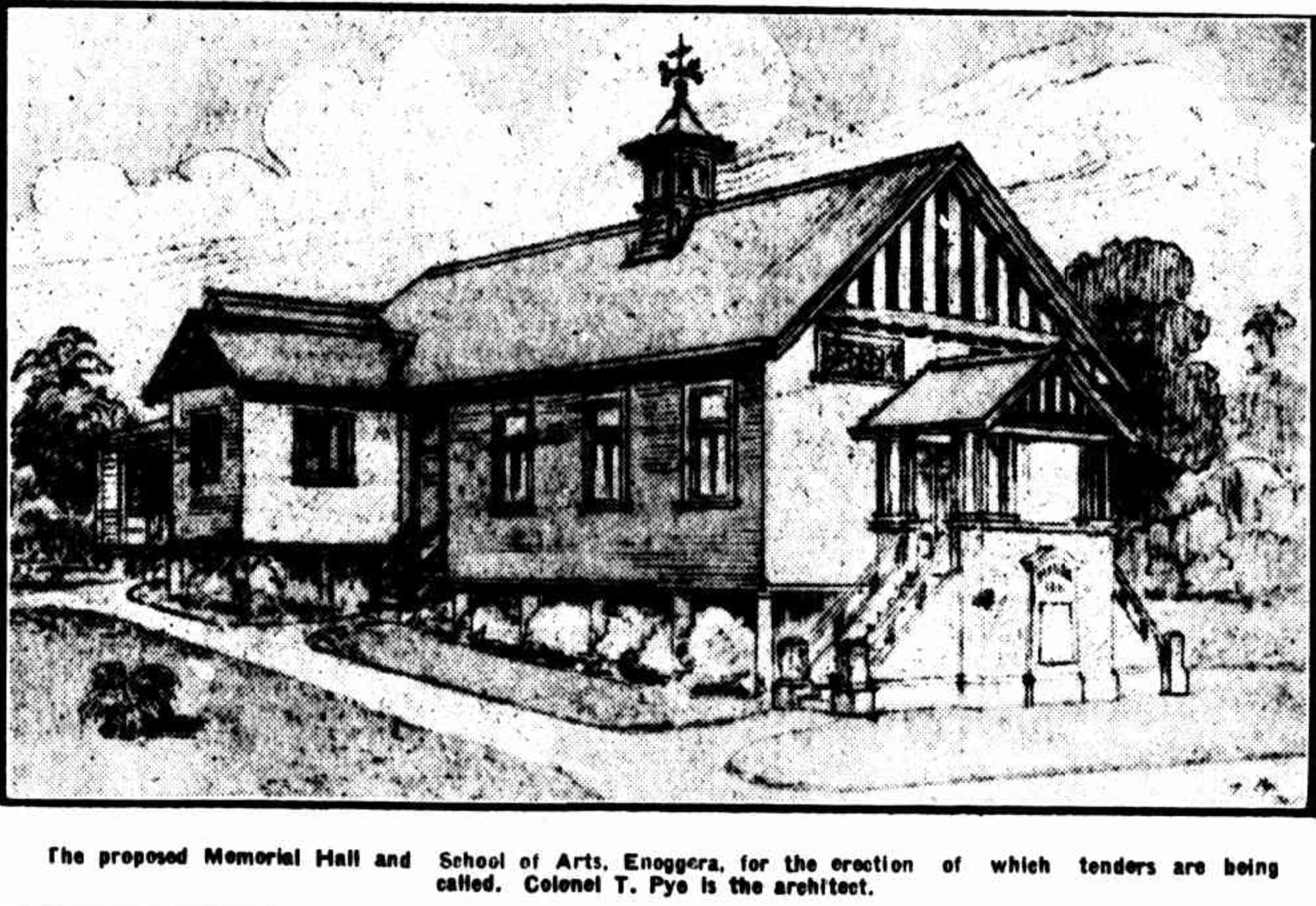
Proposed memorial hall, 1925

In 1918 the Returned Sailors and Soldiers Imperial League of Australia (R.S.S.I.L.A.) began negotiations with the Government for a suitable war memorial in the Enoggera district. It was determined that the erection of a soldiers’ hall would be combined with the existing building to form the Enoggera Memorial Hall and School of Arts. Through the united efforts of the Enoggera sub-branch of the R.S.S.I.L.A. and the local School of Arts Committee, and with the assistance of “a patriotic community,” the sum of £1237 was collected towards the cost (£1625), while satisfactory arrangements had been made for financing the balance.

By September 1924, the site for the memorial had been purchased. Construction was carried out by A. Woollam and Sons of Wilston. The memorial hall officially opened on Sunday 22 November 1925.

It is unclear when the School of Arts building was relocated to the new site.

== Design ==
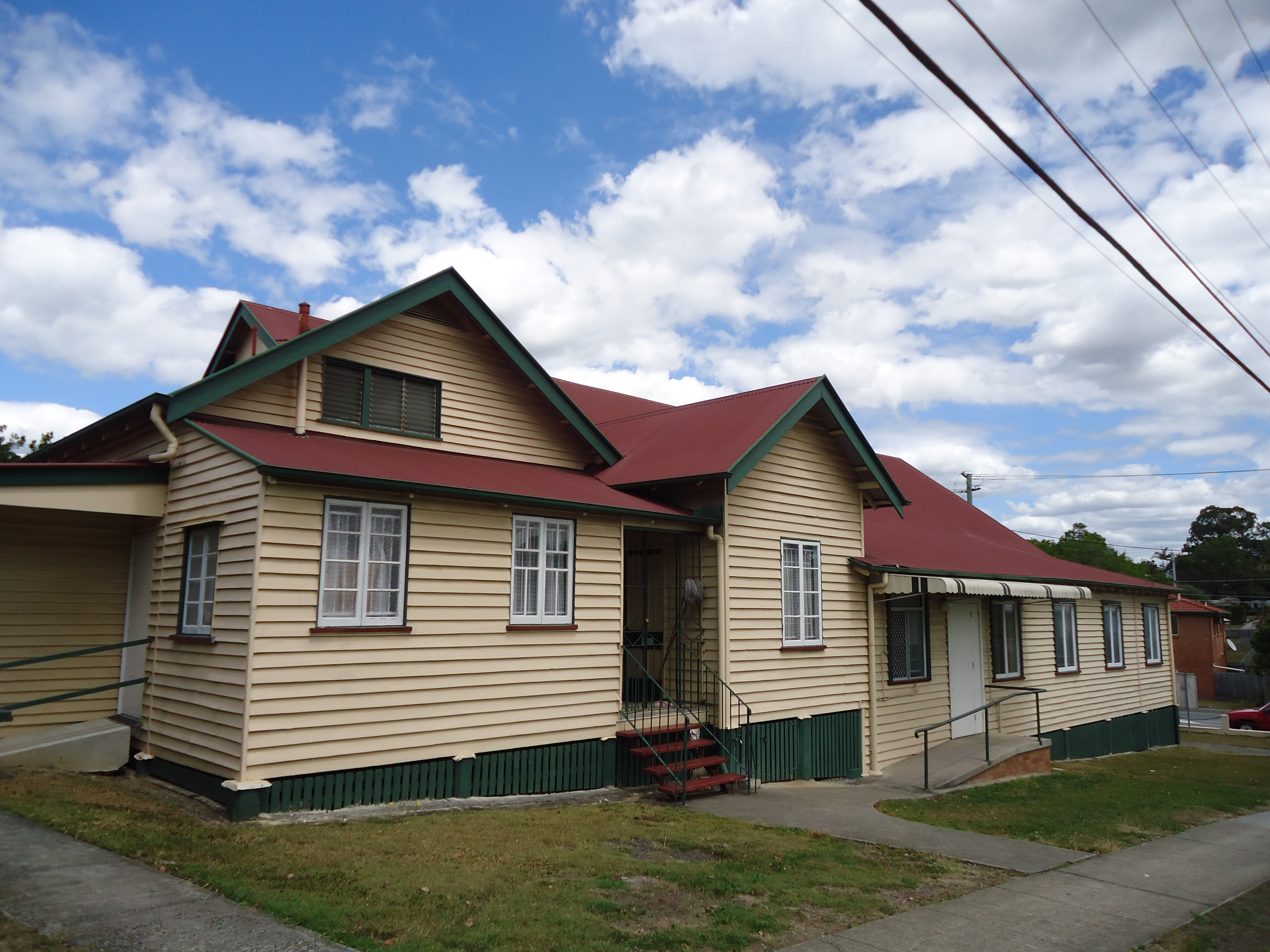
Enoggera Memorial Hall, Trundle Street elevation. Old school building visible in the foreground

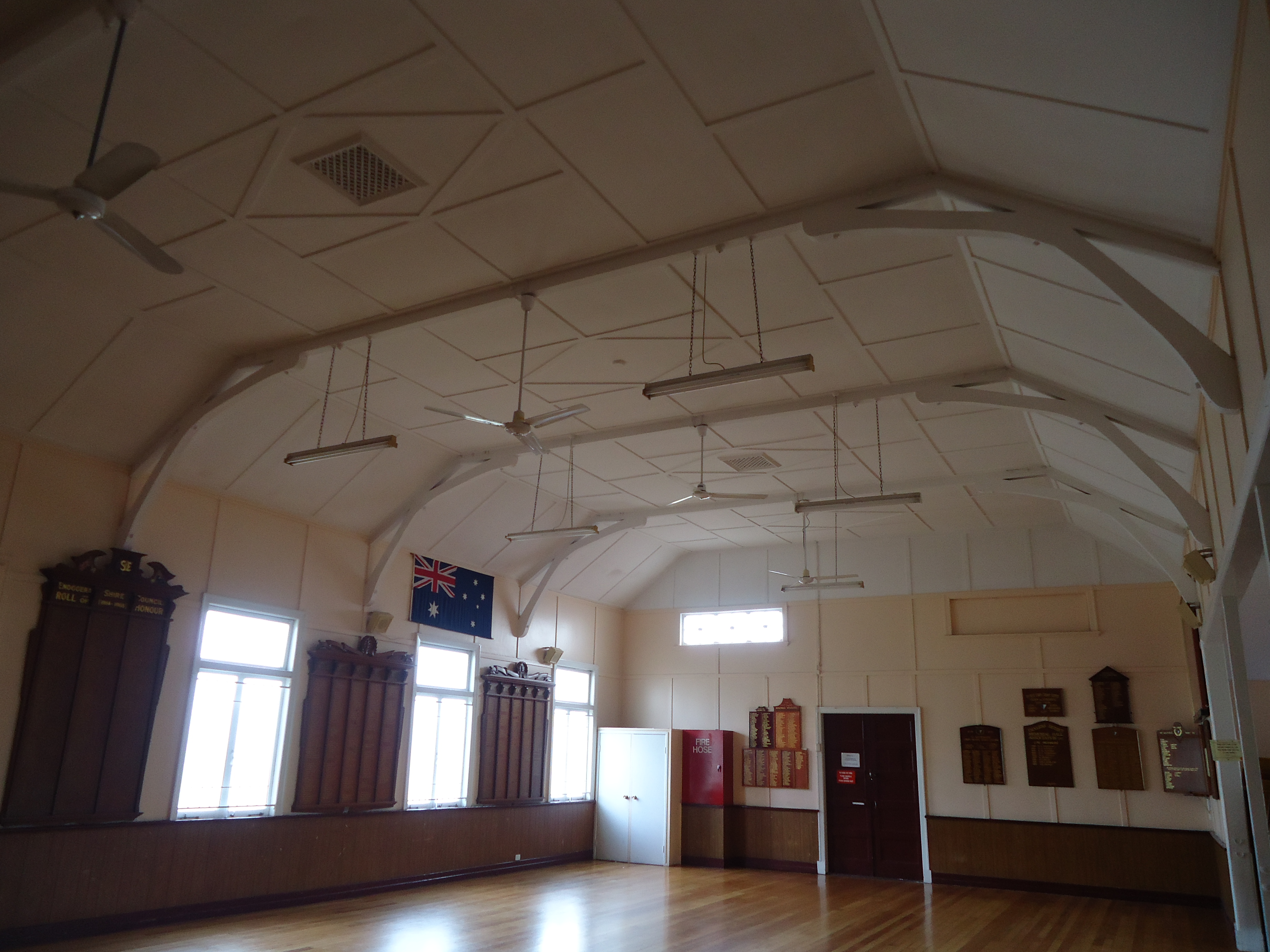
Curved truss members and ceiling banding in the interior of the soldiers' hall

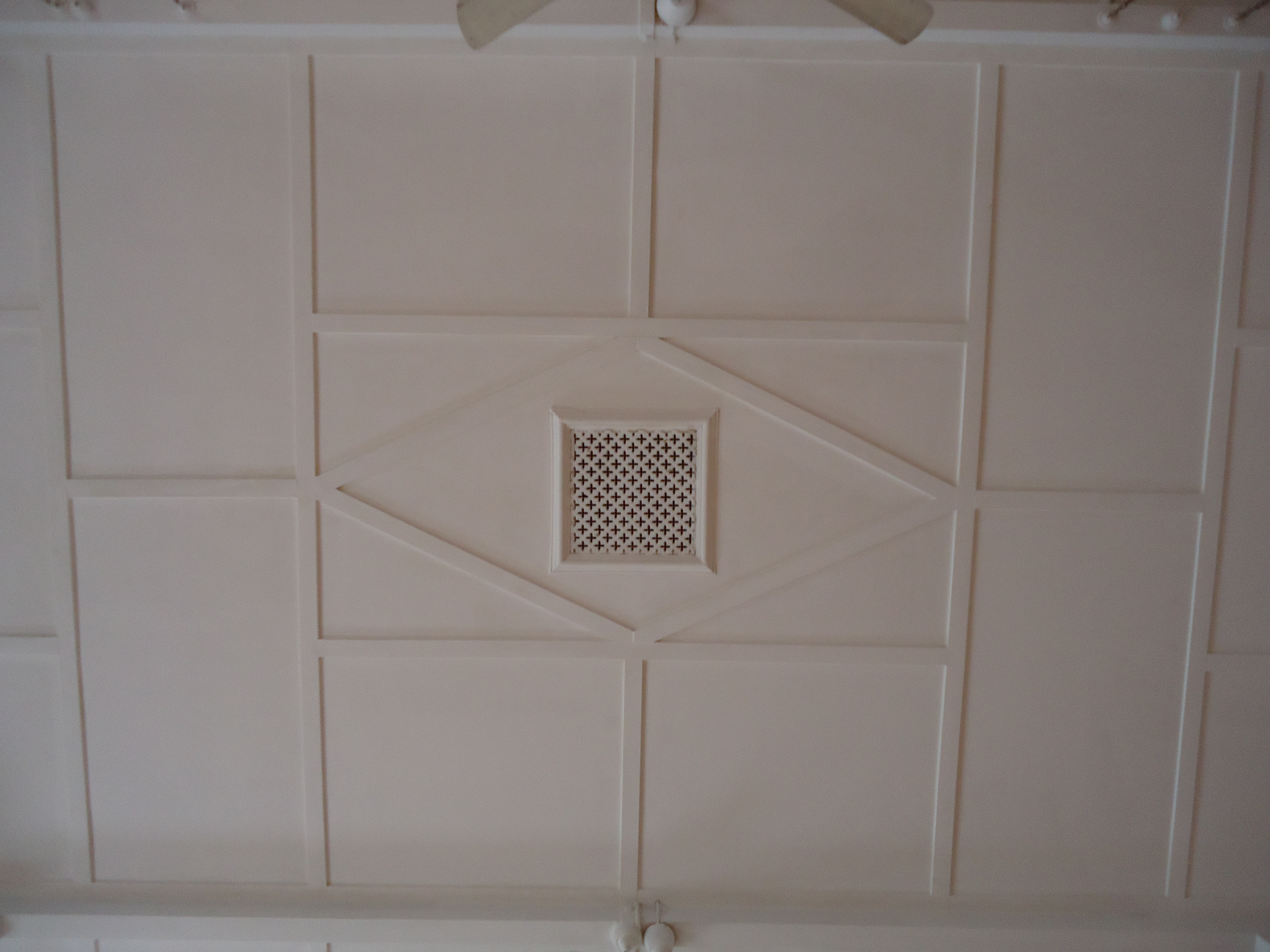
Vent and ceiling geometry

Elements of the design are consistent with Pye's architectural style which is often observed as a response to the vernacular of local domestic architecture, as well as the adaptation of the Arts and Crafts style to the environmental context of Queensland.

The longitudinal plan runs parallel to Trundle Street with the primary elevation and entrance to Wardell Street. The building uses primarily traditional timber construction with overlapping timber cladding. There is a concrete portico at the Wardell Street entrance. The concrete is textured in manner similar to earlier works associated with Pye such as Wooloowin State School, the former Woolloongabba Post Office and the Naval Offices in Brisbane, Queensland.

The form of iron gate details at the top of the stairs to the portico complements the concrete detail. This element is more pronounced in Pye's other works including the Land Administration Building and the former Woolloongabba Post Office, although may not be original at the memorial hall.

The geometries of the main roof, the roof of the portico and the stairs run parallel to one another in geometric singularity. Presumably the original plan and elevation were symmetrical. Ceiling joists extend out below the pediment of the main building. This treatment of the gable pediment is reminiscent of the domestic vernacular observable in the Brisbane suburb of Ashgrove. Vertical banding on the pediment of the main building is continued down the portico pediment, posts and the extended ceiling joists above the posts. Two symmetrical windows are situated below the pediment of the building proper, each divided into three rectangular parts with vertical, horizontal and diagonal mullions, forming an asterisk pattern.

The original design sketches indicate the incorporation of a ventilation tower typical of Pye's architecture and demonstrated in the Rockhampton Branch of the Queensland State Government Savings Bank building, Wooloowin State School, the Naval Offices in Brisbane and the Brisbane General Post Office Elizabeth Street additions amongst others.

The hall is a single open space with six visible trusses spanning the width of the room. The truss members are curved in form and are rounded where the supports meet the main members. Five rows of ceiling panels are fixed between the truss members with a symmetrical geometric pattern being formed by banding over panel joints which continues down the height of the walls. This geometry complements that of the windows located at the front of the space and corresponds to the fenestration that runs the length of the hall. The second and fourth ceiling panels have patterned ceiling vents at their centres.

The original design consisted of a hall with a stage, a soldiers' room, a library and two anterooms. In the front of the building a marble tablet was inscribed with the words “Their Name Liveth Evermore.” Additions have been made to the Trundle street edge of the building to incorporate a kitchen space adjacent to the hall as well as an extra room at the south-eastern corner. The dates of these additions are unconfirmed.

== See also ==
- Queenslander (architecture)
- History of state education in Queensland
