= Mackay Technical College =

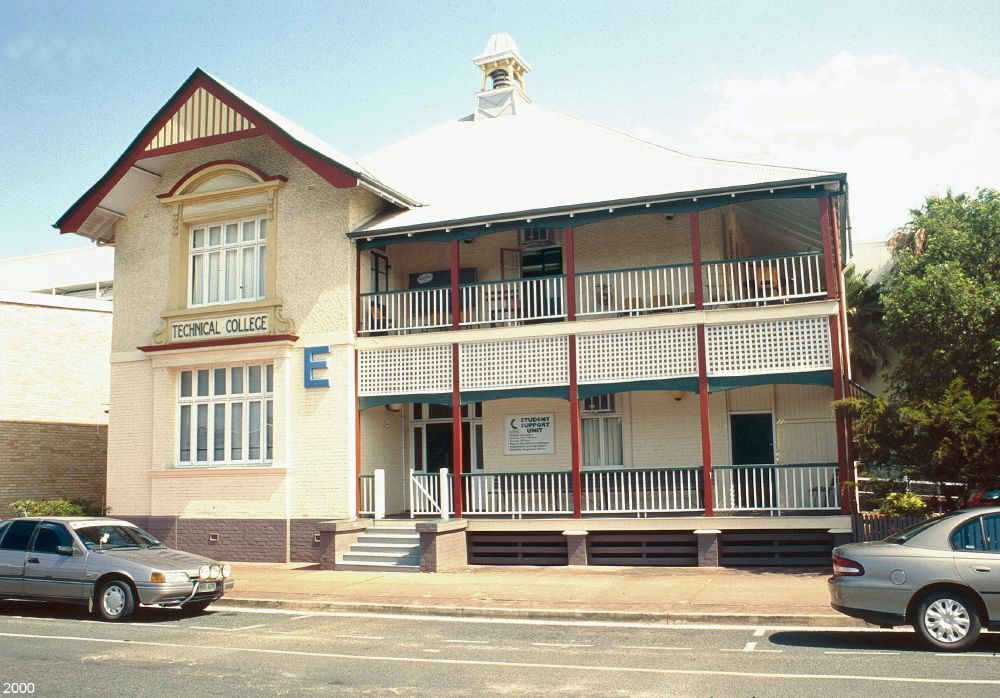
- Mackay Technical College, 2000

- Location within Queensland Location within Australia
- 21.1456°S 149.1856°E
- Location: Alfred Street, Mackay, Mackay Region, Queensland, Australia

History
- Design period: 1900–1914 (early 20th century)
- Built: 1911–1912

Site notes
- Architect: Thomas Pye
- Architectural style: Classicism

Queensland Heritage Register
- Official name: Mackay Technical College (former), Block E Mackay TAFE
- Type: state heritage (built)
- Designated: 27 October 2000
- Reference no.: 602056
- Significant period: 1910s (historical); 1910s (fabric); 1912–1959 (social)
- Significant components: college – technical, roof/ridge ventilator/s / fleche/s

Mackay Technical College is a heritage-listed former technical college at Alfred Street, Mackay, Mackay Region, Queensland, Australia. It was designed by Thomas Pye and built from 1911 to 1912. It is also known as Block E Mackay TAFE. It was added to the Queensland Heritage Register on 27 October 2000.

In 2016, the former college building is now used for administration of the Central Queensland University's Mackay City campus.

== History ==
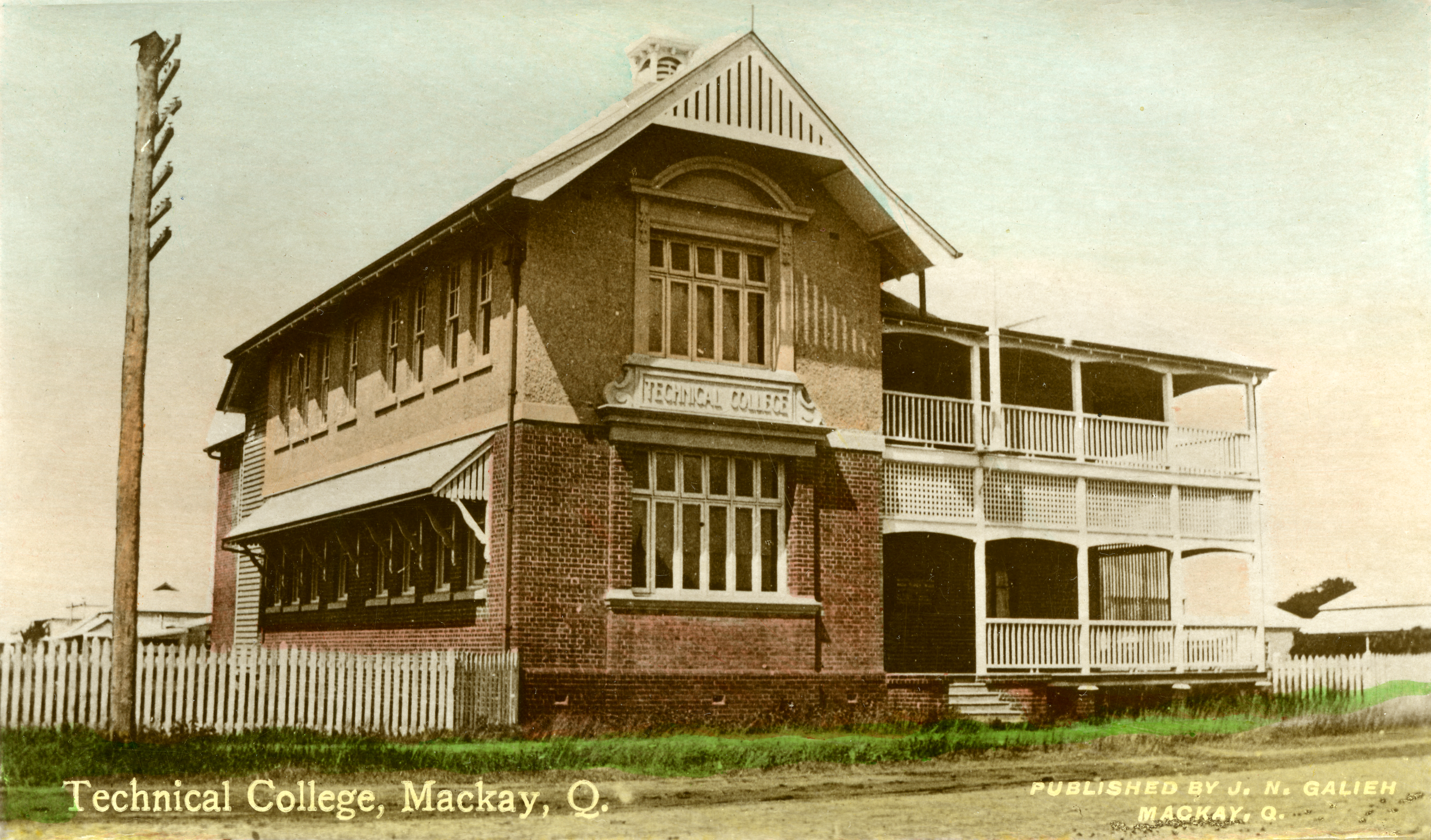
Mackay Technical College

The former Mackay Technical College was constructed in 1911–12 to a design prepared by the Office of Public Works.

Mackay was settled by Europeans in the 1860s, by pastoralists seeking new areas for expansion. Sugar became the dominant industry of the region from the 1880s, and the town grew significantly in the early to mid-20th century due to this industry. State education in Queensland in the 19th century was quite rudimentary. In 1875, legislation was passed which created the system with free, compulsory and secular education. This was, however, limited to a primary school level. After 1860, Grammar schools provided the only secondary education in the colony at this time, and these schools were only available to those who could afford the associated fees.

Technical colleges, and the teaching of technical education attempted to fill this gap in the provision of education and were the precursors of state high schools in Queensland. They started as private institutions but were gradually taken over by the state. The technical college grew out of the school of arts movement in the late 19th century. Schools of Arts, institutions run by local committees providing a library, reading room, lecture hall and rooms for public meetings, were established from the mid-19th century largely to improve the education of the working class. The school of arts committees usually organised classes in the useful arts and sciences to mechanics and tradespeople.

The first technical college in Queensland started in Brisbane in the 1870s. It operated entirely within the existing Brisbane School of Arts organisation, with the school of arts committee charging fees for its few subjects. The Queensland Government were involved from the early 1880s, providing a small grant to cover costs. However, the particular subjects remained completely within the control of the school of arts committee. From this initial grant the involvement of the government continued to increase. In the 1890s an endowment system matched revenue raised in fees on a pound for pound basis. A Board of Technical Education was established in 1902 to provide administrative support and distribute government subsidies. Later in the 1900s this board was abolished. The Queensland Government took over the running of technical education in Brisbane, and then across the state a decade later, with the passing of further legislation.

In 1907, the Education Department reported that they had collected much information on the most modern methods of constructing and equipping technical colleges. Information had been supplied by the United States Bureau of Education and John William Turner, who, in association with George Handley Knibbs, had been commissioned by the New South Wales Government to tour the United States and Europe studying technical colleges.

The Mackay Technical College building was one of a number of similar buildings constructed for technical colleges around the state at this time. These technical colleges were constructed in Rockhampton, Warwick, Toowoomba and Mount Morgan. They were generally established without the direct involvement of the government, being run by local committees. As in Mackay, architectural plans and specifications were supplied by the government, along with funds for construction, but administratively, the technical colleges remained autonomous.

In Mackay, the Department of Public Instruction took over the administration of the technical college soon after it was constructed. The Mackay Technical College also incorporated the Mackay State High School. Compared to other states the total number of high schools in Queensland was small, reflecting the state's ongoing low priority given to secondary education. Emphasis was placed on vocational and technical training, and consequently, money was spent on technical education and new architecturally attractive and well-equipped technical colleges. Like the Mackay High School (1911), the Bundaberg State High School (1919) was built attached to a technical college.

Prior to the construction of the Mackay Technical College, administration was under the control of the School of Arts committee. At the time, the work of the college was confined to day classes. Eventually, an evening class was established for those people who had left school but still wanted to continue with their education. Later, a book-keeping class was included in the curriculum and following that, a dress-making class. In 1904, the School of Arts committee suggested that other classes be established including cooking and carpentry. In 1907, the committee established a cookery class in a shop belonging to a Mr Elworthy. Attendance at this class eventually dropped off due, it is thought, to a lack of accommodation available for the students.

The committee's problems due to the lack of a suitable building was alleviated when it was announced that the Government would contribute four-fifths of the cost of the construction of buildings for technical college purposes. The School of Arts committee held a meeting to discuss means of providing the remaining funds required to construct the technical college. A sum of £500 was raised, with the state government also contributing the expertise of architects in the Public Works Department who provided plans and specifications.

By 1907, the government had prepared plans for Mackay Technical College; however, construction of technical colleges did not become a major concern until 1911. Originally, the Committee planned to have a wooden building constructed, but, after calling a second meeting, it was decided to collect the extra amount required for a brick building.

The building was designed by the Works Department architects in 1910, with the drawings signed by Alfred Barton Brady and Thomas Pye. The Annual Report of the Department of Public Works reported that the contract, "for the main building only, will shortly be completed". Construction commenced in 1911 and was completed by 1912 in time for the beginning of the school year. The completed scheme included a detached brick building, containing a chemical laboratory and carpentry workshop. The contract amount for the Mackay Technical College was £3,845.

As constructed the building was two storeys. On the ground floor were a dressmaking room, a room for general instruction and offices for clerical and administrative staff. At the rear of the building a room catered for cookery classes. Also at the rear of the building were toilet and cloak room facilities. This section has been removed. On the first floor were located three classrooms and a large art and lecture room. A separate, single-storey building, no longer extant, was constructed at the rear of the main building and housed a chemical laboratory and carpentry workshop. In 1916, drainage and repair works were undertaken to the college, as well as the addition of furniture and fittings. Total cost of the works was £96/15/8.

The official opening of the Mackay Technical College was held on Wednesday, 21 February 1912, with formal duties undertaken by the Mayor of Mackay, Hans Ditlev Petersen. Among the 150 guests included the Committee members and Herbert Denniss, Principal of the High School. Telegrams were received from the Ministers for Education (Ken Grant) and Railways (Walter Paget). The day was a grand occasion in Mackay's history. It was reported that the opening of the college building "which would also be used as a high school" marked a "new stage in the educational history of Queensland", and was a "sign of intellectual progress in the community of Mackay".

The building served as the Mackay Technical College and High School until 1959 when a new high school was constructed in the city in Milton Street. New buildings for the TAFE (the provision of technical education was rearranged as Technical and Further Education in the 1960s), were constructed on the Alfred Street site from the 1970s onwards, with this building becoming "Block E" of Mackay TAFE and was used for student support services.

Later Mackay TAFE was amalgamated into Central Queensland TAFE, which was merged into Central Queensland University (CQU) in 2014. In 2016, the building (known as Building 6) was used for administrative functions on CQU's Mackay City campus.

== Description ==
The former Mackay Technical College is a two-storeyed brick building, elevated on a brick base and low stumps. The building has a hipped roof with a gable roof projection, clad with corrugated iron. A ventilator fleche with a domed metal top is located in the centre of the hipped roof. The building occupies a prominent position on the corner of Alfred and Wood Streets, Mackay. It is painted brick on the ground floor and roughcast render on the first floor.

The building has an asymmetric front (north) elevation with a projecting gable to one side with a ground floor verandah on the northern and southern side of the building and first floor balcony wrapping around the north, south and west sides of the building. A simple timber bargeboard is located in the gable of the projecting wing. A series of windows appear on both floors of the projecting gable section. A group of six long rectangular windows are located in the ground floor and a group of five long rectangular windows are located in the first floor and are surrounded by decorative mouldings. Below these windows the raised lettering reads "TECHNICAL COLLEGE". A large blue "E" is located on the northern elevation.

Double-hung timber sash windows are located on both floors on the eastern side of the building. The windows on the ground floor are protected by sunhoods with curved, timber brackets and clad with corrugated iron. A timber staircase is located on the eastern side of the building leading to the first floor balcony on the southern side.

Timber french doors open to the verandahs from both the ground and first floors. On the ground floor the verandah has been enclosed on the western side. Timber balustrading, hand rails, verandah posts and lattice valances are located on the ground floor verandah and first floor balcony. A series of timber sunshading is located on the western side of the balcony. As part of the enclosing of the ground floor verandah, a series of timber casement windows are located on the western side of the building. Paired timber entrance doors are surrounded by a breezeway and fanlight assembly.

Internally, the front entrance leads to a foyer with rendered walls with a high pressed metal ceiling. An arched opening with decorative mouldings and keystone leads to the central hall and central staircase. The hallway runs east–west through the building with a number of panelled timber doors with breezeways, leading to offices and staff rooms. The hallway has a high pressed metal ceiling. Part of the enclosed verandah on the western side of the building is vertically lined with timber and has a ripple iron ceiling. The eastern wall of the room is brick. On the western side of the building is the room which originally housed the library. This room has plastered walls and a pressed metal ceiling. A timber picture rail is also located within the office.

A timber door opening off the central hall, facing the northern side of the building, leads to the main office area. This office has plastered walls with a pressed metal ceiling. In one corner of the office, a porcelain wash basin with splashboard is still intact. The windows on the western side of the room are double hung timber sash windows, which originally opened to the verandah. A timber door leads to the enclosed space which is vertically lined timber and has a ripple iron ceilings.

The original turning timber staircase is also extant with timber railings and timber newel with decorative carved sections. Similarly to the arrangement of rooms on the ground floor, the planning arrangement of rooms on the first floor remains intact. A hallway with a high pressed metal ceiling leads to several offices and classrooms. The original north facing classroom is now used as a library. This room, like the others in the building, has plastered walls and a pressed metal ceiling. Double hung timber sash windows are located on the western side of the room and timber french doors lead to the balcony.

The building was modified with partitions, air conditioning and kitchen facilities in order to function as part of Mackay TAFE. The surrounding site has been built up by structures associated with the Mackay TAFE. The north-west corner of the property, adjacent to the former Mackay Technical College, is currently used for car parking facilities. This car parking area, which has a number of established palm trees and other plantings, is surrounded by a low, timber, picket fence. The fence does not run passed the former technical college building along Alfred Street, but continues for a small way, terminating on the eastern side of the former technical college building.

== Heritage listing ==
The former Mackay Technical College was listed on the Queensland Heritage Register on 27 October 2000 having satisfied the following criteria.

The place is important in demonstrating the evolution or pattern of Queensland's history.

The former Mackay Technical College, constructed in 1911, is significant in demonstrating the provision of technical education in Mackay, and by extension in Queensland. It is one of many technical colleges constructed throughout Queensland in the nineteenth and early twentieth centuries as part of an attempt to "promote mental and moral improvement of the working classes." The building is significant as the first state high school in Mackay, and is significant in demonstrating the history of education in the city and surrounding area.

The place is important in demonstrating the principal characteristics of a particular class of cultural places.

The former Mackay Technical College is significant as it displays the principal characteristics of an institutional building from the government architect's office of the period, with typical details such as its two-storey masonry and timber construction and asymmetric design, with pressed metal ceilings, timber joinery and decorative ventilator fleche. The place demonstrates the principal characteristics of a building of its type, with provision for classrooms and lecture rooms, a library, a laboratory and office area.

The place is important because of its aesthetic significance.

With its design incorporating simplicity and asymmetry, its wide verandahs and timber posts, prominent central fleche and its position on the street corner surrounded by trees and plantings, the former Mackay Technical College is important for its aesthetic significance and for its contribution to the Albert street streetscape. Internal features including the timber joinery details and pressed metal ceilings also contribute to the overall aesthetic significance of the building.

The place has a strong or special association with a particular community or cultural group for social, cultural or spiritual reasons.

Forming part of the educational system in Mackay for over ninety years, the former Mackay Technical College is significant for its association with the teachers, students and other associated people during that time. The place has strong associations with the community of Mackay especially with its continued use as an educational facility.
