= Wooloowin State School =

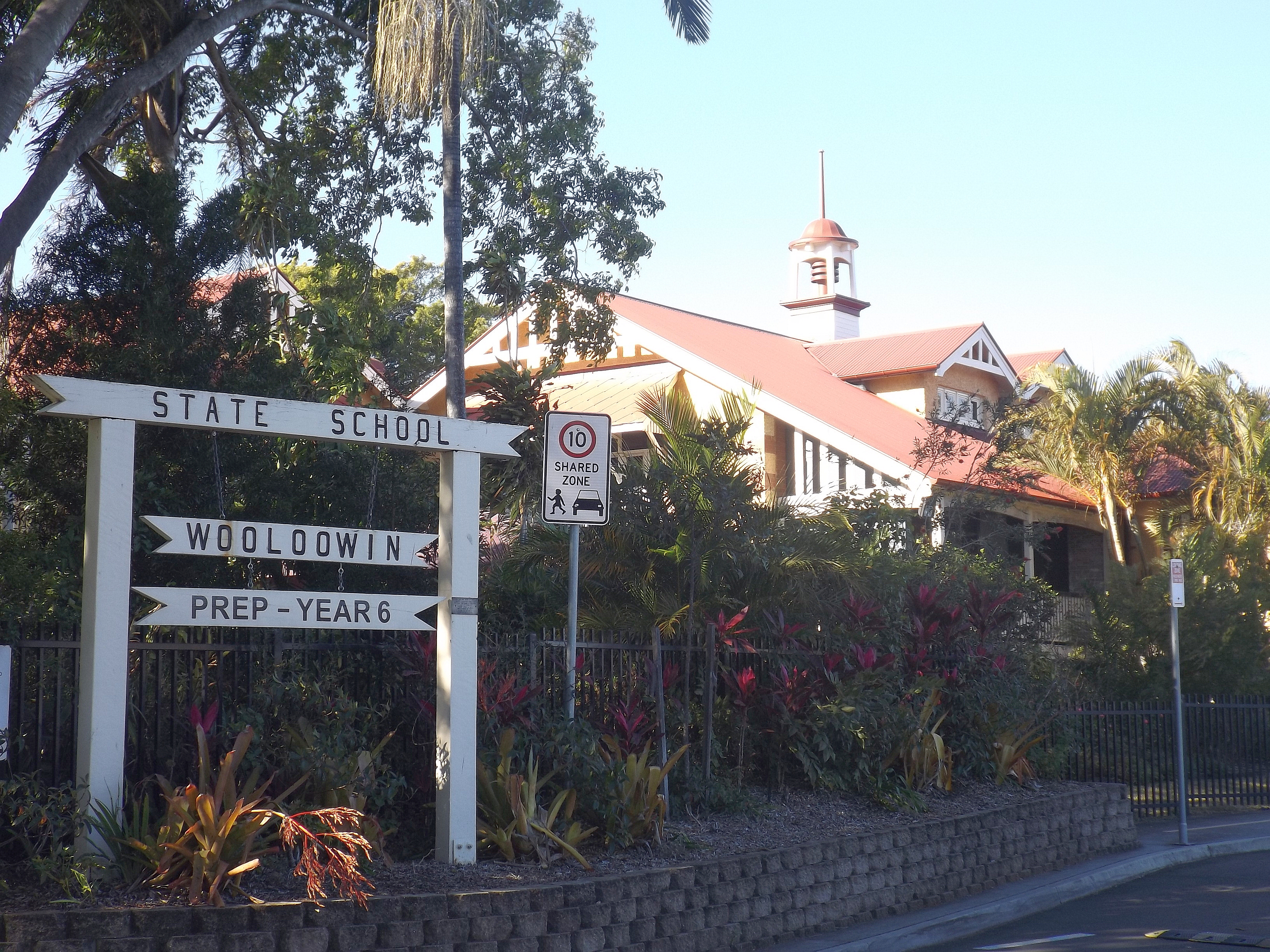
- Wooloowin State School, 2015

- Location within Queensland
- 27.4175°S 153.0371°E
- Location: 663 Lutwyche Road, Wooloowin, City of Brisbane, Queensland, Australia

History
- Design period: 1900–1914 (early 20th century)
- Built: 1914–1934

Queensland Heritage Register
- Official name: Wooloowin State School
- Type: state heritage (built)
- Designated: 13 January 1995
- Reference no.: 601565
- Significant period: 1914–1930s (historical); 1914–1930s (fabric); 1914–ongoing (social)
- Significant components: school/school room, classroom/classroom block/teaching area

Wooloowin State School

Location
- 663–665 Lutwyche Rd, Lutwyche; Brisbane, Queensland; Australia

Information
- Type: Public, co–educational, primary
- Motto: Manners Maketh Man
- Established: 12 September 1914
- Principal: Chris Hansen
- Grades: Prep to Year 6
- Enrollment: 250 (approx.)
- Campus: Suburban
- Colours: Navy blue, light blue and white
- Website: wooloowinss.eq.edu.au

Wooloowin State School is a heritage-listed public co–educational primary school at 663 Lutwyche Road, Wooloowin, City of Brisbane, Queensland, Australia. It was built from 1914 to 1934. It was added to the Queensland Heritage Register on 13 January 1995.

== History ==
Wooloowin State School was built in four stages. The first section was constructed in 1914, with additions in 1918, 1925 and 1934. In 1914, it was considered a model school at the forefront of progressive education in Queensland, and this was reflected in the building, grounds, furniture, equipment, facilities, curriculum, and staff. It was a model school for a modern, rapidly expanding suburb.

Originally part of Lutwyche, Wooloowin was named after the Wooloowin railway station (on the line to Northgate Junction) which was opened in November 1889. The area had developed a suburban identity in the 1880s, when the larger estates were subdivided, but in the first half of the 20th century, particularly following the extension of the tramline along Lutwyche Road to Kedron in 1913–1914, Wooloowin really boomed as a residential working class suburb.

In 1911, the Wooloowin Progress Association was formed. Its first secretary was William Alfred Jolly, later Mayor of Windsor, and in 1925, first Lord Mayor of Greater Brisbane. It was largely due to the work of the Wooloowin Progress Association, who formed a school building committee in October 1911, that the Wooloowin State School was established. Prior to 1914, Wooloowin children attended the overcrowded state schools at Eagle Junction and Bowen Bridge Road.

The Department of Public Instruction purchased Nolan's Paddock, a three-acre site on Lutwyche Road, for £1,200, and the design for a new school for this site was prepared in the Government Architect's Office of the Department of Public Works in 1913.

Alfred Barton Brady was employed with the Queensland Government as Government Architect from 1892 to 1922. Brady claimed that he always advised on arrangement, style and materials, but it appears that his senior assistant, Thomas Pye supervised much of the detailed design. During the 30 years they worked together in the Department, Brady and Pye assembled a talented group of architects and draftsmen who were considered the equal of any in Australia, including from 1893 to 1903 John Smith Murdoch, who was to become Commonwealth Director-General of Works in 1927. From the office of the Government Architect there developed a tradition of fine government buildings, including many post offices, customs houses and court houses throughout the State. The Department of Public Instruction had handled school design and construction between 1879 and 1893, following which responsibility was returned to the Government Architect's office. Some of the more significant early 20th century schools designed by the Government Architect's office include East Brisbane State School (1899–1900) and Windsor State School (1915–16), the latter, like Wooloowin State School, erected as a model schools.

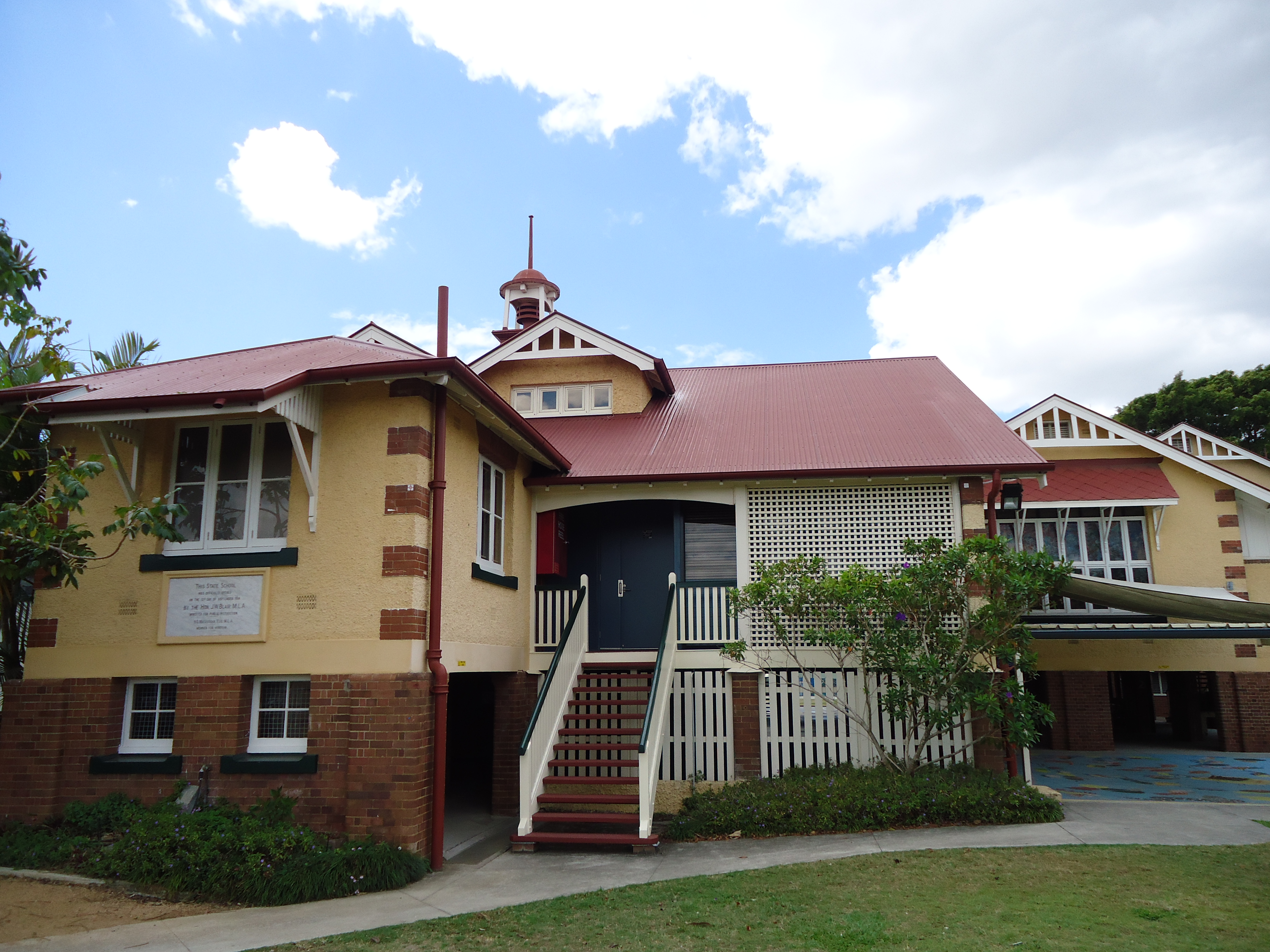
1914 building, as seen in 2011

At a cost of £3,901, Wooloowin State School was the sixth most expensive Queensland Public Works contract let during the 1913–1914 financial year, and was intended as a model or "show" school. The foundation stone was laid early in 1914 by the Secretary for Public Instruction, the Hon. James Blair (later Chief Justice), and the school was opened on 15 September 1914 with 266 pupils. It comprised four large classrooms in two single-storeyed brick wings, with 10-foot (3.0 m) wide verandahs front and back and head teachers' room and staff room attached to the front wing. The new classrooms were furnished with the most modern two-student desks with tip-up seats, providing considerably more elbow room than the old forms and desks, and with large green "blackboards" rather than the old board and easel. The staff for this model school was specially chosen from amongst Queensland's finest state school teachers.

Wooloowin State School was constructed at a time of educational experimentation in Queensland. 1914 saw the establishment of the first teacher training college in Brisbane, and a reworking of the curriculum which had been experimented with since 1905. In 1915, a new syllabus was introduced to Brisbane state schools. Continuing the emphasis of the previous decade on correlation of subjects, practical application, self-activity of pupils and character development, the new syllabus now provided for "kindergarten occupations" in infant grades; formally included school gardening in the curriculum - this could become a compulsory subject in schools where the teacher adopted it as a form of nature study; encouraged the extension of manual training and domestic science in primary schools – usually where teaching staff from technical colleges were available; and made needlework compulsory for girls. School inspectors continued to emphasise the importance of formal academic studies, but schools were broadening their outlook on what constituted useful, practical knowledge and character building activities, concentrating on the development of the whole child rather than on rote learning.

One aspect of modern progressive education was the encouragement of sports, particularly swimming. In 1908, a number of metropolitan teachers who were keen to encourage swimming amongst school children formed the State Schools Amateur Swimming Association. By 1914, 34 clubs had been formed. These clubs apparently catered only for boys, and in 1911 a State Schools Girls' Amateur Swimming Association was formed, with 28 schools affiliated by 1914. As well as swimming instruction, life-saving was taught in many schools. Keen to promote their school as one of the most modern in the state, the Wooloowin State School building committee financed construction of a swimming pool, 42 feet (13 m) long, 16 feet (4.9 m) wide and 5 feet (1.5 m) deep at the deepest end, in 1916. This pool was enlarged to its present size in 1925.

In 1918, woodwork and domestic science were added to the school curriculum, although no classrooms appear to have been designated specifically for these subjects. It is understood that Wooloowin was the first primary school to introduce these subjects, as provided for under the new syllabus provisions of 1915.

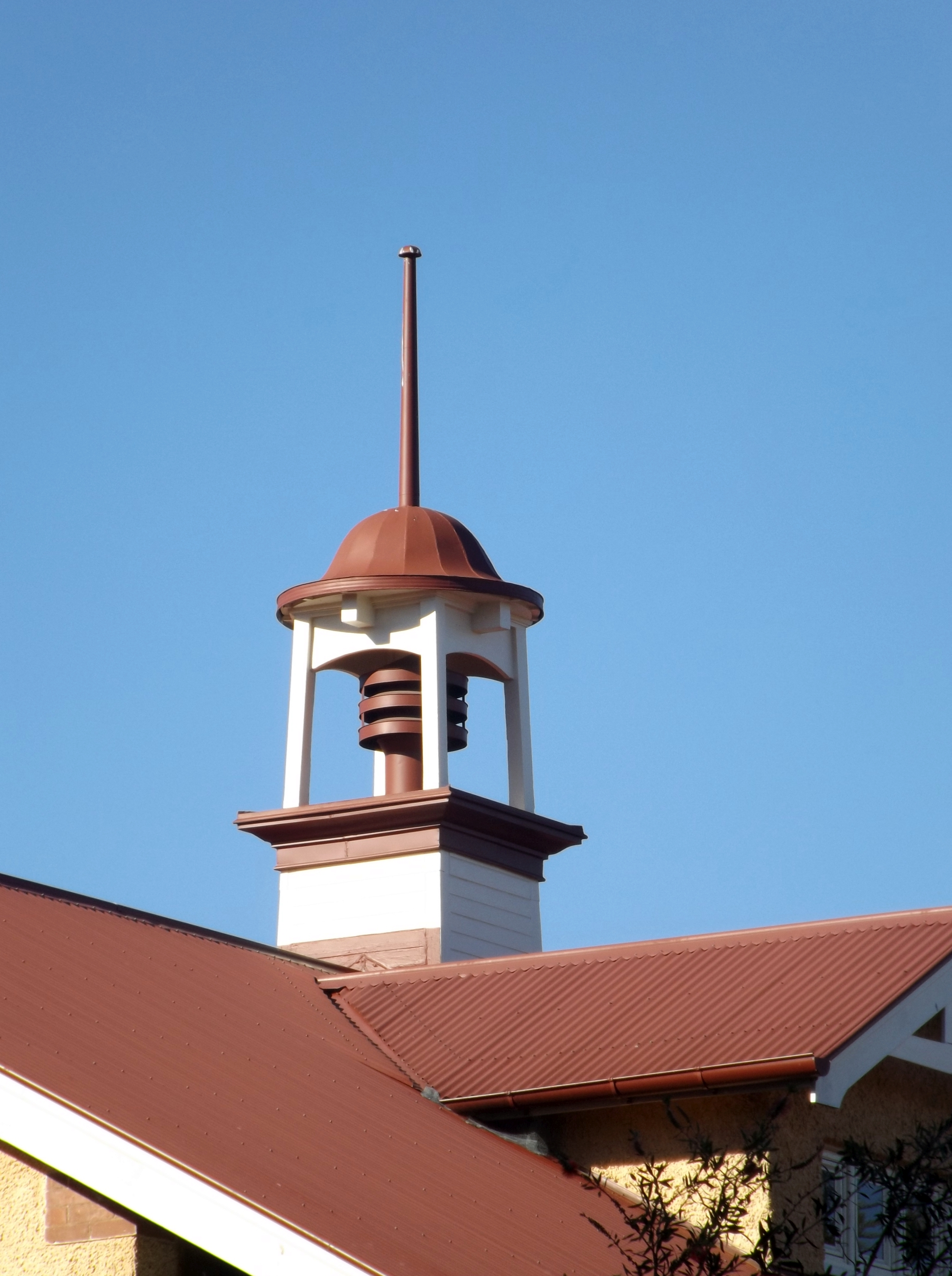
Closeup of the rooftop ventilator, 2015

The first addition to the school was constructed in 1918. It was a brick building, with 10-foot (3.0 m) wide verandahs; roughcast externally and roofed with asbestos slate, which mirrored the 1914 side wing. This brought the number of classrooms to six, and was opened in September 1918. By 1921, school enrolment had grown to over 800, and in 1923 plans were prepared for a second addition, a two-storeyed stuccoed brick building with an asbestos slate roof, containing four classrooms on each floor with hatrooms and a verandah and a balcony on the north side. This building was erected in 1925 at a cost of £6,233, and opened in July that year.

In the 1920s and 1930s, Wooloowin continued to expand as a working class residential suburb. By the early 1930s, population pressure again necessitated additions to the Wooloowin State School, and in 1934 a three-storeyed brick wing was constructed on the northern side of the site. It had a face brick and roughcast exterior, fibro cement slates to match existing buildings, and 10-foot (3.0 m) wide balconies on each floor. Each of the upper floors had four classrooms, and the lower storey contained purpose-equipped domestic science and manual training rooms. In the 1930s and 1940s, students from Windsor State School, further south along Lutwyche Road, attended woodwork and domestic science classes at Wooloowin State School's new facilities.

The 1934 building was the last of the additions. In the second half of the 20th century, Wooloowin State School enrolments steadily declined as the surrounding area changed demographically toward an older population.

In 2015, the school had an enrolment of 297 students in classes from Prep to Year 6 with 25 teachers (19 equivalent full-time) and 15 non-teaching staff (9 full-time equivalent).

== Description ==
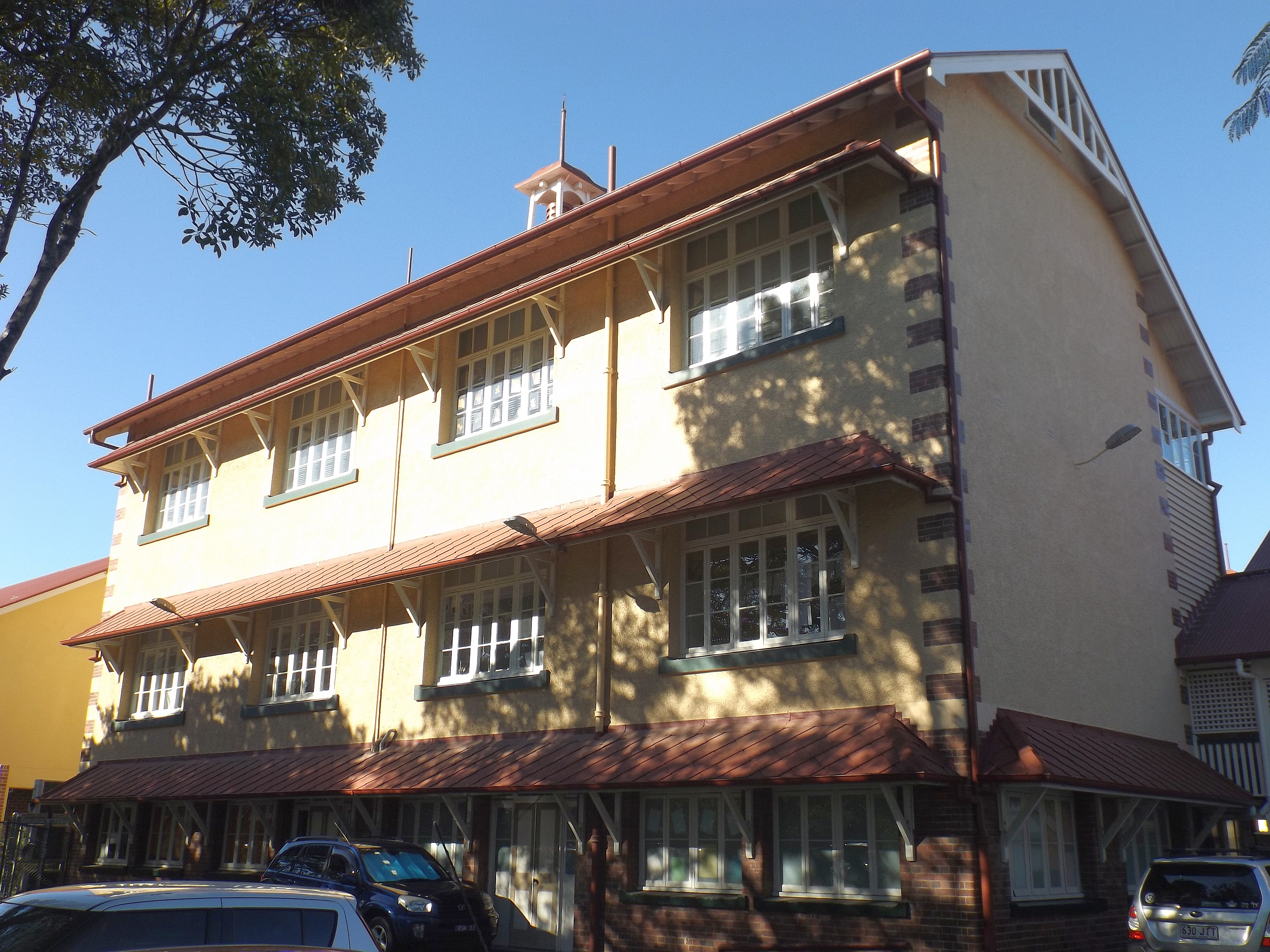
Classrooms in 2015

Wooloowin State School's 1914. 1918 and 1925 buildings form a coherent group of one and two-storeyed classroom blocks linked together by verandahs. The buildings are masonry constructed on brick piers, which form an undercroft play area. Most of the exterior of the buildings are roughcast render. Originally the roof was covered with red asbestos slates, which has been replaced with corrugated iron. Each of the individual pavilions has a separate roof, with ventilators and projecting gabled skylights.

The 1934 addition is a three-storeyed masonry building with face brick and roughcast render which complements the earlier blocks. The original red asbestos slate roof has been replaced with corrugated iron.

Apart from the re-roofing, the exterior of the complex is very intact.

== Heritage listing ==
Wooloowin State School was listed on the Queensland Heritage Register on 13 January 1995 having satisfied the following criteria.

The place is important in demonstrating the evolution or pattern of Queensland's history.

Wooloowin State School is important for its association with progressive, early 20th century education in Queensland, being constructed in 1914 as a "show" suburban primary school, the quality of the building, furnishings, equipment, facilities, curriculum and staff serving as a model for future state schools.

Wooloowin State School is evidence of the rapid growth of Wooloowin and adjacent areas which accompanied both the expansion of public transport in the area in the early 20th century, (especially the extension of the tramline to Kedron in 1913–14), and the success of the Workers' Dwelling Scheme (1909) which made home ownership accessible to the working class.

The place is important in demonstrating the principal characteristics of a particular class of cultural places.

Wooloowin State School is significant as an excellent example of a school building designed for the Queensland climate with wide verandahs and a ventilated roof, and follows a tradition of fine buildings erected by the Queensland Public Works Department. The use of brick and restrained detailing is typical for government buildings of the period.

The place is important because of its aesthetic significance.

Wooloowin State School is significant also as an outstanding example of a school building designed by the office of the Queensland Government Architect, which at the time was the equal of any architectural office in Australia. It is exceptional in its quality and form and displays characteristics typical of its style through its simple massing, roughcast render and broad roof planes extending over verandahs with projecting gables and ventilators.

== See also ==
- List of schools in Queensland
- Education in Australia
