= Block A, Rockhampton Technical College =

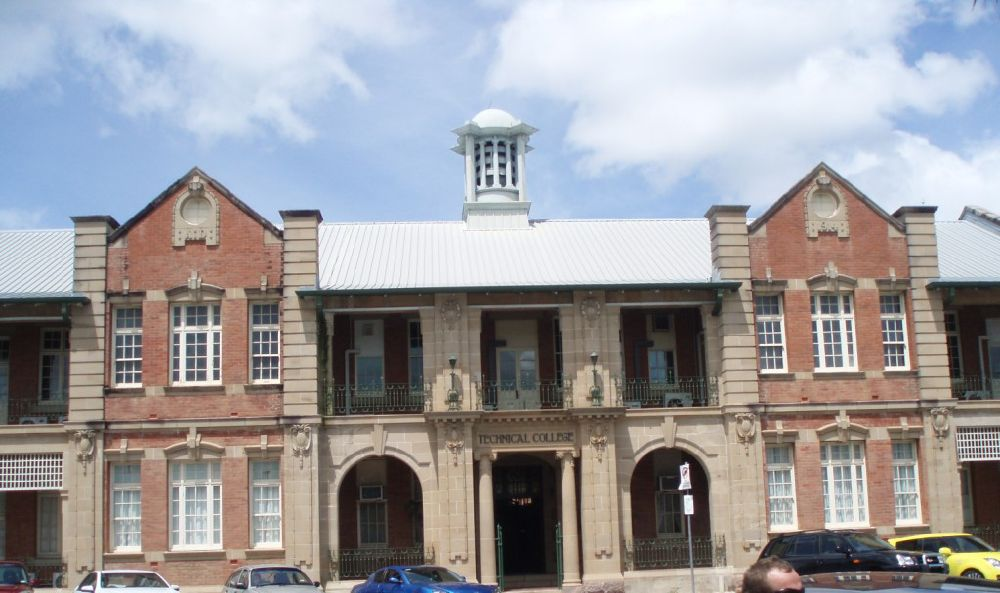
- Block A as seen from Bolsover Street, 2009

- Location within Queensland Location within Australia
- 23.3797°S 150.5125°E
- Location: Bolsover Street, Rockhampton City, Rockhampton, Rockhampton Region, Queensland, Australia

History
- Design period: 1900–1914 (early 20th century)
- Built: 1914

Site notes
- Architect: Thomas Pye
- Architectural style: Classicism

Queensland Heritage Register
- Official name: 'A' Block, Central Queensland Institute of Technical and Further Education (TAFE) Rockhampton Campus, Rockhampton C.O.T.A.F.E., Rockhampton State High School and Technical College
- Type: state heritage (built)
- Designated: 21 October 1992
- Reference no.: 600789
- Significant period: 1910s–1950s (historical); 1910s–1930s (fabric); 1910s–1960s (social)
- Significant components: tower, classroom/classroom block/teaching area

Block A of the Rockhampton Technical College is a heritage-listed technical college building at Bolsover Street, Rockhampton City, Rockhampton, Rockhampton Region, Queensland, Australia. It was designed by Thomas Pye and built in 1914. It was also known as Rockhampton College of T.A.F.E. and Rockhampton State High School and Technical College. It was added to the Queensland Heritage Register on 21 October 1992.

== History ==
The Central Queensland Institute of Technical and Further Education, Rockhampton Campus, in particular "A" Block fronting Bolsover Street, is important for its association with the history of education in Rockhampton. The building is also an important component of the central business district of the city. The original building, "A" Block, was constructed in 1914 and the Science Block, "D" Block (demolished), was constructed in 1919.

After the short lived Canoona gold rush of 1858, Rockhampton was proclaimed as a town and declared a "port of entry". The first moves to establish classes for a Technical College in Rockhampton began in July 1861. This was initiated by the first committee of the Rockhampton School of Arts, which had stated its primary aims to include "the diffusion of literary, scientific and other useful knowledge to be attained by means of a reading room. The delivery of lectures, a library, and the establishment of classes." The School of Arts building, which was constructed in 1865, was replaced in 1894 when a new School of Arts was built.

Despite the grandiose hopes of educating the community of Rockhampton, initial community reaction to the use of the public reading room was lukewarm. Courses were offered in classical languages, at various times, but the standard of education was dependent upon interest from the local community, and the standard of school teachers who were willing to contribute to after hours lectures.

In 1890 a drawing class was established by the School of Arts Committee. Technical courses such as drawing classes were offered, which later provided the impetus for a centre of higher learning. Classes were also offered in mechanical and technical drawing, as well as other practical subjects such as carpentry.

The first Technical College was constructed in Brisbane in 1882. In 1898 the Brisbane Technical College Act was passed, which established a governing council for the College. However other technical Colleges, such as Rockhampton, were to be run by independent boards. In 1902 a Board of Technical Education, created by thirty-four Technical Colleges throughout Queensland, was established to advise the Minister for Public Instruction. The Board was abolished in 1905 when a separate branch of the department was established.

In 1904 a dedicated School of Mines opened in Rockhampton. This educational centre was conducted in Alma Street behind the School of Arts building. Classes were offered in metallurgy, mineralogy, geology and chemistry. An indifferent response from students saw the School of Mines close in 1906. Additional classes were offered in regional centres such as Mount Morgan and Gladstone. The classes offered by the School of Arts Committee were subsidised by the state government.

The State Government passed of the Government Technical Schools Act 1908, allowing for the establishment of vocational/education based studies. In 1909 the classes were placed in control of a Technical College Committee that was separate from the Rockhampton School of Arts. The Technical College Committee was a partially elected, partially Government nominated body. Classes were still held in the School of Arts building, and additional classroom space was made available in the Market Building (Schotia Place), for cookery classes, opposite the School of Arts building in Bolsover Street.

The Department of Public Instruction had been involved with the design of primary and technical schools since 1907, utilising knowledge gained from overseas trips by other educational authorities in Australia. American educationalists favoured the establishment of separate departments in separate buildings, spread out over a large site, but grouped systematically together. Plans of this type were prepared for Technical Colleges in Mackay and Mount Morgan.

In 1910 additional classes were added to the curriculum, including mathematics. However the curriculum, and the number of classes being offered by the Technical College, was overtaxing available space in the School of Arts building. In 1911 a Certificate of Title was issued to the Secretary for Public Instruction for Allotment 2 of Section 48, granting title for over two acres of land in Bolsover Street, and planning began for the construction of a Technical College for Rockhampton.

In 1912 a donation of a half acre of land fronting Alma Street was made to the Technical College by James Stewart. The Science Block of the Technical College ('D' Block) was to be subsequently constructed on this site in 1919.

Stewart was the founder of James Stewart and Co., a millinery company that expanded into the retail and drapery trade during the latter part of the 19th century. Stewart's maintained branch stores in Blackall, Barcaldine, Longreach and Mount Morgan. The company was situated in Stewart's Criterion House, and in the 1920s employed over three hundred workers in Rockhampton. Stewart was generous in his gifts to the community, also purchasing a former Congregational Church in Bolsover Street and donating it for the use of the Presbyterian Church in Rockhampton.

Following the donation of land to the Technical College Committee in 1912, £1,400 was raised by local subscription towards the erection of a purpose built building for the Technical College. The Government was to supply four fifths of the cost of building and equipment for the Technical College.

The Department of Public Instruction approved the construction of the main building in July 1913, and estimated the cost of construction at £12,733. Construction of the building (now "A" Block) began in early 1914, and CG Davies was the overseer of the construction work. The work was supervised by the Department of Public Works, and the design was produced by the office of Government Architect Alfred Barton Brady (1856–1932). However, Deputy Government Architect Thomas Pye (1861–1930) is thought to have been involved in the actual design. Other buildings designed by this office include the Elizabeth Street building, Brisbane General Post Office (1908), Administration Centre of Challinor Centre (Ipswich Mental Hospital, 1914), and Windsor State School (1915–16). At this time, work was also proceeding on the Brisbane Central Technical College and Warwick Technical College.

The Rockhampton Morning Bulletin reported on the construction of the Technical College buildings in May 1914

The new technical college buildings in Bolsover Street are gradually assuming the shape intended by their designer:

"The whole of the subdividing walls are equally advanced, whilst the heavy timber joists have been laid ready to receive the reinforced concrete of which the floor will be constructed". The stonework hitherto has proved something of a check upon the rate of progress, chiefly because of the scarcity of masons, and the enormous amount of work that is necessary to prepare some of the arch pieces."

The building at this time had only fifteen workers actually employed on construction, six of them being masons. Stonework used was from the Stanwell quarry, and to speed up the building work four masons were sent from Brisbane. Decorative stonework was also to be incorporated onto the face of the building, consisting of eleven carved shields. Overall the work was expected to be finished within its specified completion date (end of 1914), and

"there is every reason for believing that... Rockhampton will possess an up to date college building with a floor space of between 14,000 and 15,000 square feet"

The new Technical College building opened in 1915 for its first pupils receiving training in semi-vocational courses. In 1918 the Department of Public Instruction assumed full control of the Technical College. At this time the Technical Instruction Amendment Act had been passed by the State Government which was to further increase the centralisation of technical colleges, and to place them under the administration of the Department of Public Instruction.

On 3 February 1919, the Department established the Technical High School, in conjunction with the Technical College. Courses were to be offered for day students for the first time. The Technical College Committee, at the time of the takeover of the College, was in a relatively strong financial position, having £900 in the general fund and £300 in the building fund. The establishment of the High School combined with the Technical College was the first institution of its kind in Queensland.

The Science Block ('D' Block) was constructed in 1919. The two- storeyed brick building was constructed at a cost of £4,596. The building faced Alma Street, and contained

practical physics, engine testing and plumbing class rooms, together with office, teacher's room, and store on ground floor. The upper floor contains chemical laboratory, balance and lecture room, drawing room, and store.

The design was produced by the office of Government Architect AB Brady, with construction being undertaken by the Public Works Department. The full block was not completed.

By 1920 the first Technical High School classes for day students were established. The increasing emphasis on technical and commercial courses saw an increasing number of enrolments in the Technical College. Additional classrooms were also provided at a cost of £1,127. Training was offered in a wide variety of trades for apprentices. Many trade workers in Rockhampton received training from the Queensland Railway Workshops, building, motor and electrical trades. During the depression era, the Rockhampton Technical College also offered free training to youths unable to find employment. Over one hundred young people were trained in wood working, sheet metal work and trade drawing.

The standard of education within the College received a further boost in 1925 when training was offered in the Queensland University Diploma in Mechanical and Electrical drawing (continuing on a curriculum tradition established by the Rockhampton School of Arts).

During the Second World War special classes were initiated under the Commonwealth Munition Training Scheme. Sixty fitters and eighty turners were trained and sent to various parts of the state involved in the production of war materials.

In 1933 Bolsover Chambers adjoining the Technical College property in Bolsover Street was purchased, and converted into a workshop in the same year. This was later converted into the Engineering Block with access from both Bolsover Lane and Bolsover Street. Another building, the former Evening News building, was also acquired for additional activities of the College.

An extension was made to the southeastern part of the "A" Block building in 1934. The extension included a new assembly hall and domestic science classroom.

In 1945 the school became a Junior Technical Training College, and special classes were also initiated for returned servicemen under the Commonwealth Post War Reconstruction Training Scheme, as a rehabilitation initiative. In 1955 there were 1,650 enrolments in the various trade, diploma, commercial, art, adult and primary domestic science classes. A full-time staff of 11, and a part-time staff of 29 provided education in the above courses.

In 1958 a two-storeyed additional building was built fronting Bolsover Lane. The building was established for the use of an Electrical Trades Block, and incorporated electrical laboratories, and heat engine laboratories.

A new High School was opened for students in Rockhampton on 14 May 1960, opposite the Rockhampton Show Grounds. From 1960 students began to transfer into the new buildings, as a result of overcrowding at the Bolsover and Alma Street location. At the end of 1960 approval was given for the construction of three additional wings at the new High School for a cost of £114,020.

A second trades workshop was proposed for the Technical College site in 1963, adjoining the 1919 Science Building ('D' Block). A Plumbing Shop on the site was to be demolished for the new workshop, which was constructed in 1964 at a cost of £63,167. A motor mechanics workshop was provided in 1966.

A proposal was also put forward in 1966 to convert the "A" Block building into the Central Queensland Campus of the Queensland Institute of Technology. The new Institute of Technology was part of the further development of Queensland higher education being undertaken at this period. In 1966, the Capricornia Institute of Technology was established in Rockhampton. At the same time, the Queensland Institute of Technology was established at the site of the Brisbane Central Technical College. Newer Technical College campuses were also being established throughout Queensland, at places such as Yeronga and Eagle Farm. Regional centres were expected to develop their own centres of advanced learning. The Rockhampton Institute has since developed into the Capricornia College of Advanced Education, and the University of Central Queensland.

The Bolsover Street Campus did not form part of the development of the centre of advanced learning, but has since been converted into the administrative centre for the Central Queensland Institute of T.A.F.E., Rockhampton Campus. Work was undertaken in 1993–94 to underpin the foundations of the southern end of "A" Block and to repair severe cracking.

Due to severe structural problems, "D" Block was demolished in 1997–98, and lot 13 and part of lot 14 on plan LN 804845 were removed from the heritage register in May 1999.

== Description ==
The Central Queensland Institute of T.A.F.E., Rockhampton Campus, fronts Bolsover Street to the northeast, Alma Street to the southwest, and is bisected by Bolsover Lane. The complex contains several buildings, with the significant structure being "A" Block, which fronts Bolsover Street. "D" Block (former Science Block now demolished), fronted Alma Street.

=== 'A' Block (1914) ===
"A" Block, a Federation era two-storeyed brick and sandstone structure, has a ribbed metal gable roof with a central cupola, consisting of a dome supported by a ring of columns on a square base with a central ridge ventilator. The Bolsover Street elevation is a symmetrical composition, mostly faced with sandstone, consisting of a two-storeyed verandah penetrated by gabled projections either side of a central entrance.

The ground floor central entrance has low wrought iron gates and is flanked by Ionic columns supporting an entablature with the name TECHNICAL COLLEGE in relief to the frieze, and prominent dentils to the cornice. The columns are framed by pilasters with decorative carvings in relief. The entrance is flanked by an arch to either side, and each arch has an expressed keystone and extrados, with a decorative wrought iron balustrade. The first floor verandah has sandstone pillars with decorative wrought iron balustrading, and pilasters featuring relief carvings and wrought iron lamps above the entrance.

The gable sections have face brickwork with sandstone corner pilasters and window mouldings. The ground floor pilasters have relief carvings, and the first floor pilasters, which project above the parapet terminating in a shallow cornice, have expressed coursing. Both floors have a large central multi-paned casement window flanked by a narrower multi-paned sash window to either side. These windows have sandstone sill and head mouldings, with an expressed keystone to the central window. The gable parapet has a central circular opening surrounded by a sandstone moulding, with the letters A.D. to the southern gable and the year 1914 to the northern gable.

The gable sections are flanked by verandahs at either end of the Bolsover Street elevation. These verandahs have sandstone pillars with decorative wrought iron balustrading to both floors, and metal lattice valance panels to the ground floor. The end pilaster has relief carvings to the ground floor and expressed coursing to the first floor, and projects above the parapet terminating in a shallow cornice.

Both ends of the building have a gabled parapet, with a central circular opening surrounded by a sandstone moulding, with the year 1914 to the northern end, and regularly spaced multi-paned sash windows to both floors.

The rear of the building has regularly spaced multi-paned casement windows to both floors, and downpipes with pressed metal rainwater heads. A centrally positioned free-standing two-storeyed masonry structure is located behind the building, and is linked via a covered walkway on both levels. This structure has a corrugated iron hipped roof, high level multi-paned windows, and houses toilets for the use of students to both levels. An earlier opening at the rear has been bricked-up.

The main entrance has paired timber doors with fanlight framed by sandstone quoining and surmounted by a deep sandstone cornice. Each door has an oval, multi-paned glass panel to the upper section, and timber panelling to the lower section, and the fanlight has leaded glass. Adjacent to the entrance is a marble plaque with an inscription commemorating the donation of the land by James Stewart. The entrance is flanked by sash windows, and French doors with fanlights and sash windows open onto the verandah from both floors.

Internally, the entrance foyer has a timber panelled dado, and timber panelling surrounding the reception. The reception counter has an adjacent notice board, and both are surmounted by timber pediments with the names ENQUIRY and NOTICES in relief. A central corridor runs the length of the building, and a concrete half-turn stair with landings and metal balustrade is located opposite the entrance foyer. The stair and entrance foyer are separated from the corridor by segmental arches with expressed keystone, voussoirs and impost mouldings. A timber door, with a multi-paned glass upper panel, is located below the stair and accesses the ground floor of the toilet block at the rear. A second door is located on the upper landing of the stair and accesses the upper level of the toilet block. The building has rendered masonry walls, fibrous cement ceilings with timber battens, and linoleum floor coverings to public spaces.

A library is located at the northern end of the ground floor, a classroom is located at the southern end, and offices and service rooms open off the corridor. The first floor contains classrooms, offices and service rooms opening off the central corridor.

=== 'D' Block (former Science Block 1919) - demolished ===
"D" Block, a two-storeyed brick structure, had an L-shaped plan with a corrugated iron gable roof to the front section and a hipped roof to the rear.

The Alma Street elevation was an asymmetrical composition, consisting of a gabled section with an adjacent entrance wing on the northwestern side. The building had rendered details including sills and window heads. The entrance was located at the northwestern end and was framed with rendered mouldings consisting of an arched head with expressed keystone, framed by pilasters supporting a deep cornice, and the name SCIENCE & ENGINEERING in relief to the frieze. A wide first floor casement window was located above the entrance, with narrower casements adjacent to the ground and first floor. The gable section had a slightly projecting central bay which housed a pair of wide casement windows to both floors. These windows were united by a common rendered head moulding surmounted by a shallow cornice. The gable had a central circular roof ventilation opening with rendered surround.

The southeastern wall was blank to the front section, with regularly spaced multi-paned sash windows to the rear wing, which was slightly recessed. The northwestern wall was similarly blank to the front section, with a central circular roof ventilation opening to the gable, and a slightly recessed stairwell projecting at the rear. The rear wing had a verandah along the northwestern side, which returned to align with the stairwell at the western end, and abutted a hipped roofed projecting room at the northern end. The verandah had timber posts, with curved timber brackets and a battened valance to the ground floor, and a curved timber valance to the first floor. The first floor had a metal railing, with a non-original walkway linking it to an adjacent building. Timber panelled doors opened onto the verandah, and the stairwell had a multi-paned sash window to the first floor. The lower part of the first floor exterior walls, along the northwestern side of the building, had been rendered in an attempt to overcome rising damp deterioration to the brickwork. However, the brickwork above the rendered section showed evidence of deterioration.

Internally, the entrance foyer had paired timber doors with an arched fanlight, and an adjacent reception/office with timber panelling to counter height, and multi-paned sash windows and fixed glazing above. The stairwell, located opposite, had a timber stair with battened balustrade, timber newel posts and handrail. The building had timber skirtings, architraves and window sills, and the ceilings were boarded. The ground floor walls were rendered, and the first floor walls were only partly rendered. The plan of the building consisted of a large classroom on the southwestern side fronting Alma Street, with a smaller classroom at the rear, and smaller offices and service rooms surrounding the stairwell. The building showed evidence of severe cracking due to foundation movement.

== Heritage listing ==
'A' Block of the Rockhampton Technical College was listed on the Queensland Heritage Register on 21 October 1992 having satisfied the following criteria.

The place is important in demonstrating the evolution or pattern of Queensland's history.

'A' Block is important for its association with the establishment and development of education in Rockhampton and central Queensland. The Government Technical Schools Act 1908 allowed for the establishment of vocational/education based studies, and the Rockhampton Technical High School combined with the Technical College was the first institution of its kind in Queensland, and was to be the precursor of other such developments in provincial cities throughout Queensland.

The place is also important in demonstrating the development of the civic centre of Rockhampton, particularly during the early part of the twentieth century.

The place demonstrates rare, uncommon or endangered aspects of Queensland's cultural heritage.

The place is significant in relation to cultural heritage.

The place is important in demonstrating the principal characteristics of a particular class of cultural places.

The building is also a good example of technical college structures of the period, which evolved in response to progressive thinking in the design and planning of educational institutions.

The place is important because of its aesthetic significance.

'A' Block, constructed in 1914, is of considerable architectural merit, and its form and fabric illustrate a skilled design approach. "A" Block also demonstrates a fine quality of workmanship in the detailing of its materials and finishes. The building makes an important aesthetic contribution to the Bolsover Street streetscape, and is an important component of the civic centre of Rockhampton.

The place has a strong or special association with a particular community or cultural group for social, cultural or spiritual reasons.

The place is significant for its association with the Rockhampton community being a principal centre of education since 1914.

The place has a special association with the life or work of a particular person, group or organisation of importance in Queensland's history.

The site is also associated with prominent businessman James Stewart, who in 1912 donated a parcel of land fronting Alma Street for the establishment of the Technical College.

The building is a significant example of the work produced by the office of Government Architect Alfred Barton Brady, and Deputy Architect Thomas Pye, other examples of which include the Elizabeth Street building, Brisbane General Post Office (1908), Administration Centre of the Challinor Centre (1914) (Ipswich Mental Hospital), and Windsor State School (1915–16).
