= Windsor State School =

School and historic site in Queensland, Australia

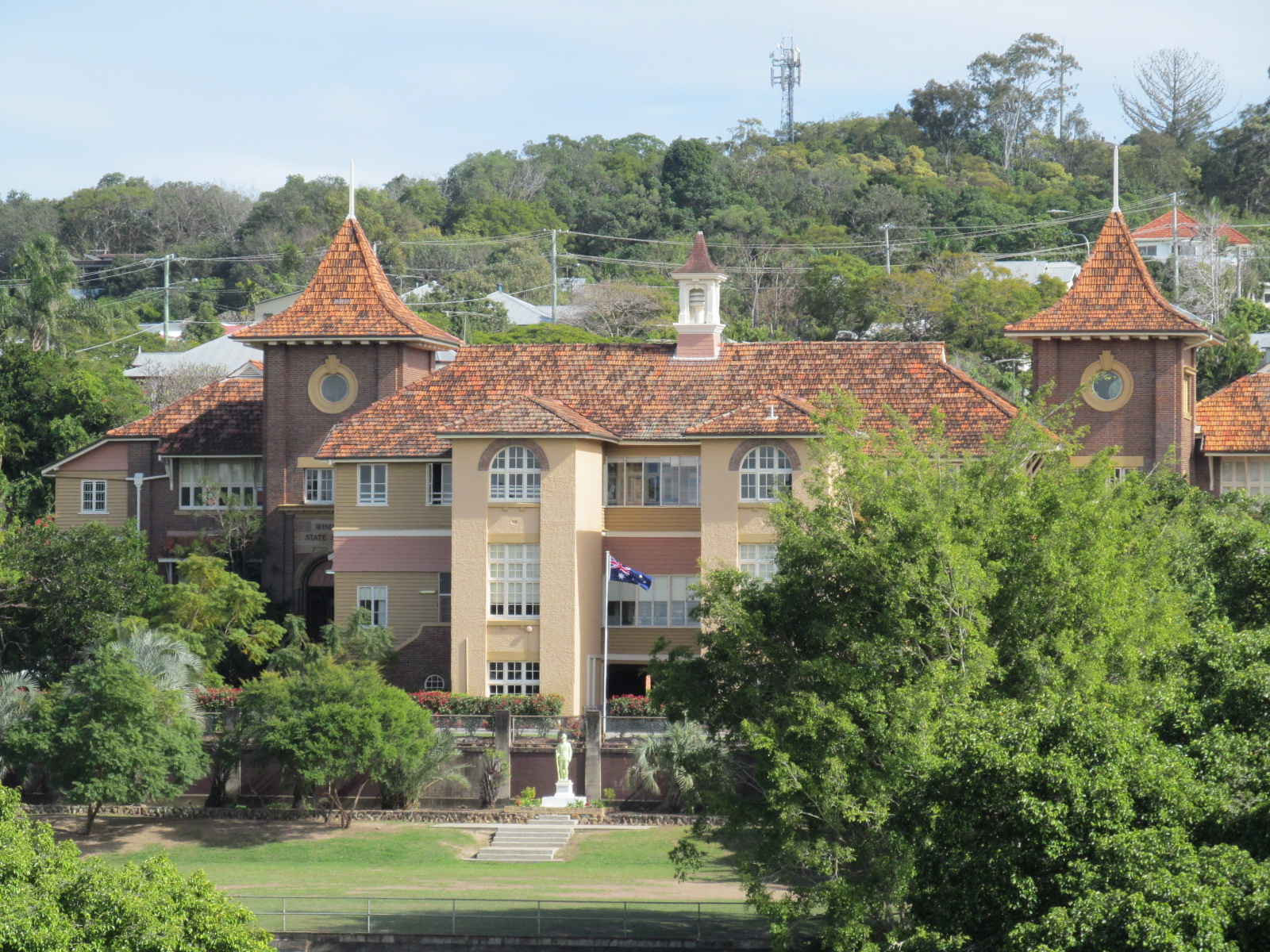
- Building in 2015

- Location within Queensland Location within Australia
- 27.4313°S 153.0305°E
- Location: 270 Lutwyche Road, Windsor, Queensland, Australia

History
- Design period: 1914–1919 (World War I)
- Built: 1915–1934

Queensland Heritage Register
- Official name: Windsor State School, Windsor Opportunity (Special) School, Windsor State School & Windsor Infants School
- Type: State heritage (landscape, built)
- Designated: 1 August 1994
- Reference no.: 600991
- Significant period: 1910s–1930s (historical); 1910s–1930s (fabric); 1915 ongoing (social)
- Significant components: Garden/grounds, classroom/classroom block/teaching area, school/school room, tower

Windsor State School is a heritage-listed state school at 270 Lutwyche Road, Windsor, Queensland, Australia. It was built from 1915 to 1934. It is also known as Windsor Opportunity (Special) School and Windsor State School & Windsor Infants School. It was added to the Queensland Heritage Register on 1 August 1994.

The school celebrated its sesquicentenary (150th anniversary) in 2015.

== History ==
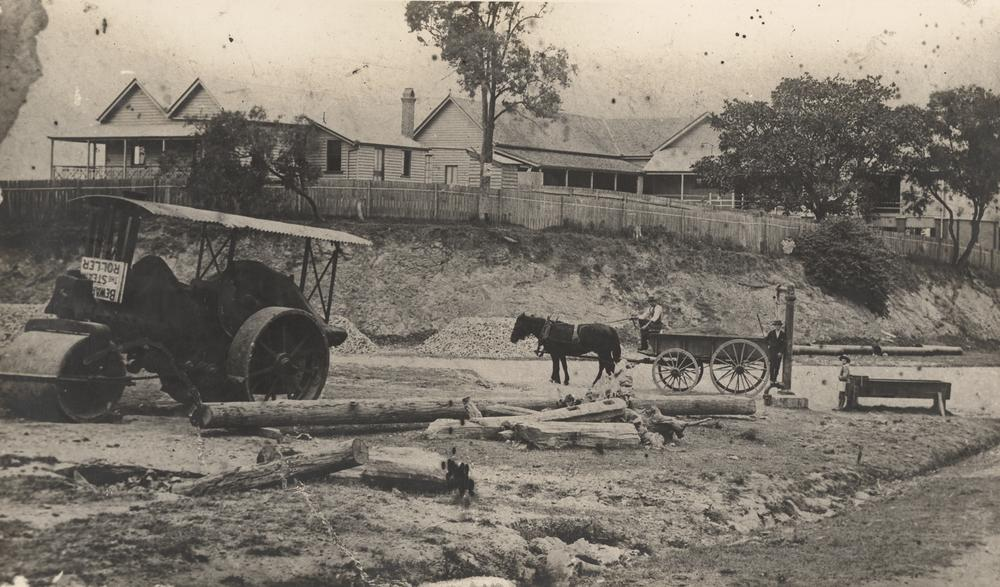
Old Bowen Bridge Road State School, circa 1910

The first school building constructed at the Windsor Campus was the Windsor State School, erected in 1915–16 on land acquired by the Queensland Government in 1912 and 1914 as a school reserve. A large, two-storeyed masonry building, it replaced the earlier and vastly overcrowded Bowen Bridge Road State School (established 1865) opposite (and which was partially damaged by fire in December 1915).

The new school was opened officially on Saturday 5 August 1916 by Herbert Hardacre, the Minister for Public Instruction, under the new name of Windsor State School, although the school had actually opened a week earlier. When opened, it was the largest school in the state.

Its construction reflected a local population boom, partly an outcome of the extension of the railway line from Mayne to Enoggera via Windsor in 1899 and the consequent closer settlement of the larger estates. In 1904, Windsor was proclaimed a town, incorporating Albion, Wooloowin, Wilston, Windsor, Lutwyche, Newmarket, Swan Hill and portions of Eagle Junction and Kedron.

The state school building was designed by Philip Arthur Edwards, a British trained architect working in the Government Architect's office, for the Queensland Department of Public Instruction. Erected at a cost of £15,154, it was the second largest public works project of 1915, and was one of the largest and most modern brick state schools constructed in Queensland. The building could accommodate 990 pupils at double desks (built in Sydney by EJ Forbes & Son Ltd), and had floorage for 1100 children. Ensuring adequate ventilation was an emphasis of the design.

When occupied in 1916, the school had a population of 1000. By 1918 this had grown to 1093, and the old problems of overcrowding had arisen again.

In 1918 the school reserve was fenced with timber palings, and the first tennis court (earth surfaced) was constructed by the School Committee.

A 30-metre (98 ft) long concrete swimming pool, funded by the School Committee through a bank loan, was constructed in the school grounds in 1925, at a cost of £2,000. In 1926 the dressing sheds were completed and the pool was lit for evening swimming carnivals. It was damaged c. 1927 during a severe storm, but was rebuilt.

In 1926, Windsor was designated a practising school, where trainees from the Teachers' Training College received classroom teaching experience.

By 1927 there were almost 1500 pupils enrolled, and hundreds of students had no permanent classroom. The Works Department prepared plans for a separate infants' school early in 1927, but this did not eventuate until the 1930s. The school population peaked in 1928, with 1,642 pupils. Facilities were so strained that the school rented the verandahs and front room of the Windsor School of Arts Building as temporary classrooms, while a number of verandahs on the school building were being enclosed. The remaining verandahs were enclosed in subsequent years.

Between 1931 and 1933, over £8,000 was spent on site improvements, as part of the Queensland Government's Unemployment Relief Scheme. The grounds were cut and terraced into the three present levels: school; tennis and basketball courts; playing fields.

Finally, in 1934, a brick building was erected to the south of the main block, to accommodate the infant grades and relieve pressure on the main classrooms. It cost about £6,600 and was described at the time as a new departure in planning for infant pupils, providing accommodation for 360 school pupils as well as kindergarten classes, in a self-contained block with an extensive concrete play area below. Whether a kindergarten operated from this building in the 1930s is unclear.

In 1940, brick extensions were made to the western end of the northern wing of the main building, providing a further four classrooms at a cost of about £6,000.

The Second World War caused considerable disruption to school routine. Pupils travelling from a reasonable distance were ordered to attend their closest school; the classroom windows were taped in case of bomb blasts; and the playing fields were zig-zagged with about 366 metres (1,201 ft) of slit trenches. 1942 National Safety Regulations required that half the children attended school in the morning, and the other half in the afternoon.

Early in 1943 the Allied Works Council erected for the United States Navy, large storerooms on the school grounds at the corner of Lutwyche and Constitution Roads, reducing the available playing field area even further. Despite post-1945 attempts by the school authorities to retrieve the lost ground, these stores were used after the war firstly as a Rehabilitation Training Centre, and then to house Education Department supplies. They are not considered of significance to the entry in the Heritage Register for Windsor Campus.

The school sustained a strong enrolment well into the post-war years. In 1946, there was an average attendance of 756 pupils in the state school, and 323 in the infants'. However, attendance declined through the 1950s and 1960s, as the young families of the first half of the 20th century grew up and moved to the newer outer suburbs, and the local population aged.

With the decline in pupil numbers, changes were made to the school structure. An opportunity school section was opened in the infants' block c. 1965, and at the beginning of 1967, infants reunited with the older students in the main building, leaving the 1934 building to the opportunity school students.

In the late 1970s, Windsor qualified as a Special Program School, the district being considered of declining social and financial climate. By 1980 enrolment had fallen to 300, with a substantial percentage of children from non-English speaking backgrounds. In 1981 a preschool was established in the Harris Street wing of the main building. Since 1984, senior pupils from the special school (formerly the opportunity school) have attended a school at Newstead, and many of the juniors have been integrated into the regular classrooms. Since the mid-1980s, the state school, special school and preschool have been known collectively as the Windsor Campus.

== Description ==
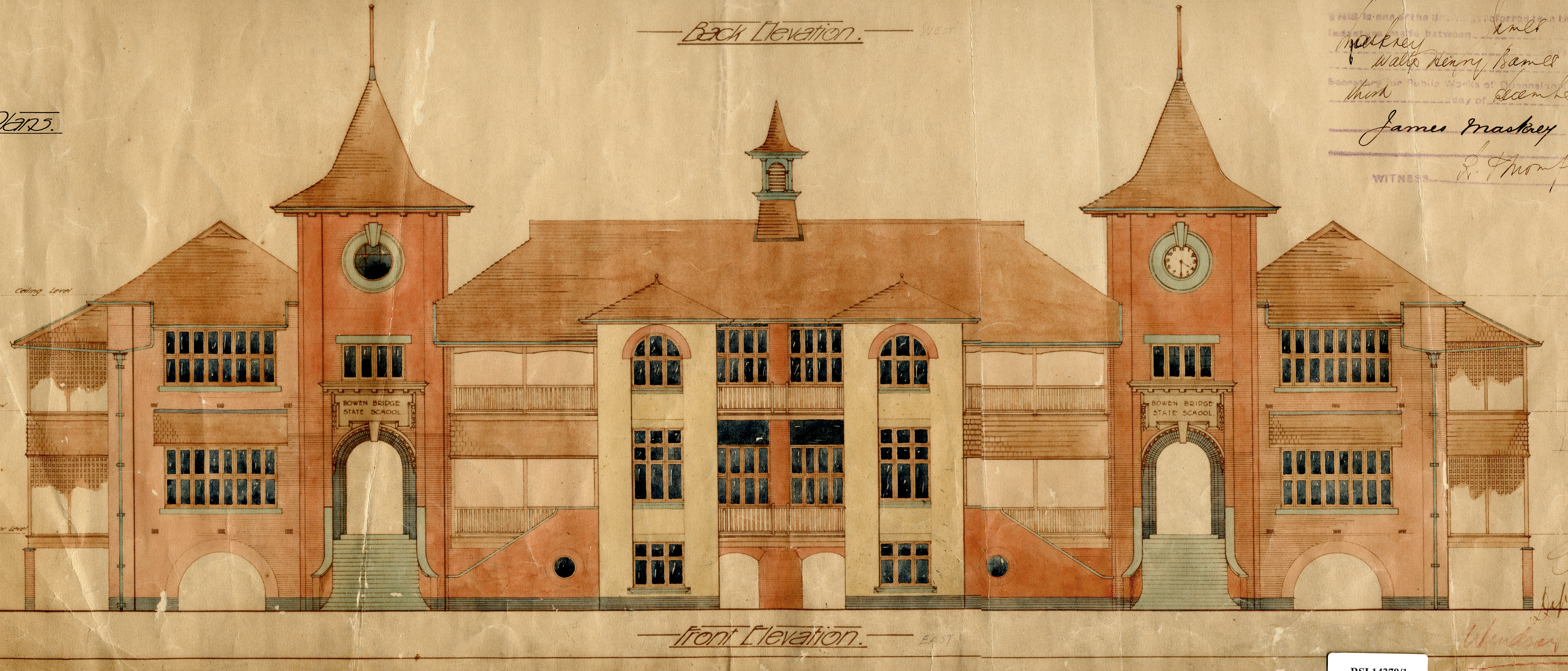
Architectural plans for the Bowen Bridge State School (later renamed Windsor State School), 1914

The Windsor Campus, located on the eastern slope of Windsor Hill, consists of two masonry school buildings, two toilet blocks and a swimming pool in large treed grounds overlooking Lutwyche Road on the east and bounded by Harris Street on the north and Constitution Road on the south. The main school, a two-storeyed building surrounded by verandahs with an open playspace at the ground level, is situated in the north-west corner, the highest part of the site. The single-storeyed Infants' School with partly enclosed area under, is located on the southern side of the main building. Both buildings are constructed with brick walls and timber framed terracotta tiled roofs. A cutting forms the western boundary of the site.

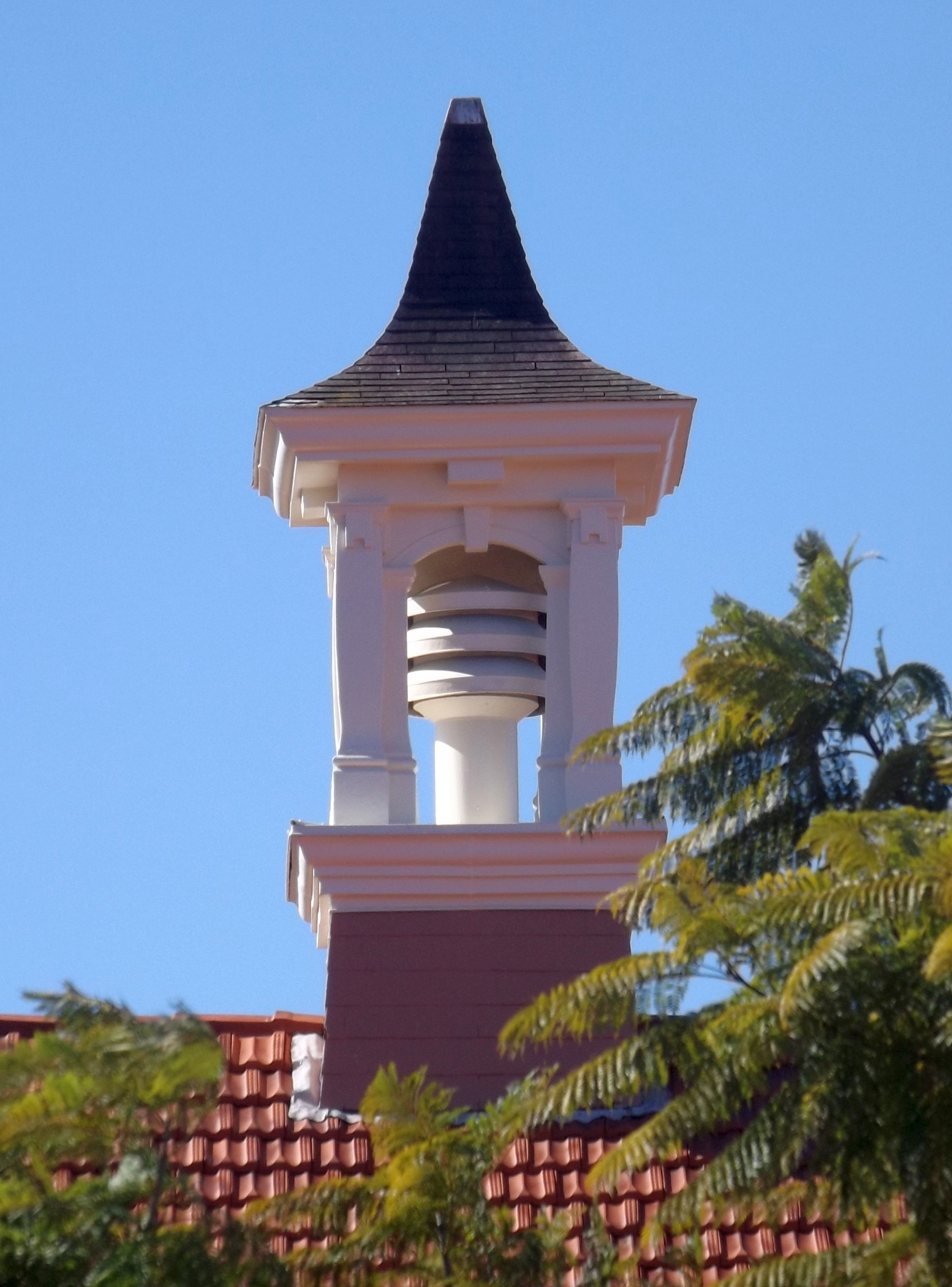
Rooftop, 2015

The main school building, based on a U-shaped plan arranged around a playground, consists of a northern and southern wing connected at their eastern end by a third wing. Towers with steep bell-cast roofs are located in the north-east and south-east corners, at the junctions between the wings. Each wing, consisting of two levels of classrooms above an open ground floor level, has a gambrel roof extended on two sides to cover the verandahs. The extensive timber verandahs, now enclosed, retain ripple iron ceilings and shingled valances. Movement between the wings is via the continuous verandah which wraps around the playground.

The impressive eastern facade of the central wing flanked by its four storeyed stair towers and surmounted by a fleche, sits above the sweeping grounds and is visible from Lutwyche Road. The main entrances are on the eastern faces of the stair towers where wide stairs lead to ornamented arched openings on the first floor level. The uppermost level of the towers have bullseye windows and openings supported by colonettes. The two further sets of stairs on the front elevation lead to the verandah and feature bullseye windows. Rear entrance, from the playground, is via stairs in the north-east and south-east corners placed at 45 degrees to the facades.

Attached to the verandahs on the playground elevations and on the eastern front elevation are three storeyed rendered masonry structures consisting of a single room on each level. These tower-like elements have hipped roofs connecting to the main roof of the adjoining wing.

The classroom interiors have high level windows, panelled fibro cement walls, fibro cement ceilings and timber floors. Floor framing is supported on large steel I-beams. Windows in exterior walls have vents above protected by the window awnings. A timber honour board is located on the first floor level of the south wing.

The north wing, originally the mirror-reverse of the south, is now twice the length with an internal stair at the western end. Adjacent to this stair on the upper level, an area which connects the two verandahs contains hat and coat racks.

Two toilet blocks, single storeyed brick structures with hip roofs, define the north-west and south-west corners of the playground.

The Infants' School is a rectangular building with long elevations facing north to the main building and south across a yard to Constitution Road. Divided into bays which step out from the corners of the building to the centre of each facade, the dark brick walls have contrasting concrete bands at the base and at first floor level and concrete sills. The central bay on the northern and southern facades is surmounted by a gable punctuated by an oculus and has a semicircular arched opening at the base. Brick porches on the eastern and western ends are now enclosed.

The main entrance is via two symmetrically positioned concrete stairs on the southern side of the Infants' School. At the top of the stairs are recessed porches, now enclosed by double glass doors, which open onto entry vestibules. Access to classrooms and offices is via these vestibules and the central corridor which connects them. The corridor, vestibules and porches have concrete floors. The rest of the building has timber floors. Some of the classrooms retain panelled folding partitions between adjoining classrooms. The classrooms are well lit via banks of timber casement windows. Hipped tiled awnings over the windows are supported on timber brackets.

An internal concrete stair on the northern side of the western vestibule leads to the ground floor level. Built as an open undercroft, the ground floor is now partly enclosed providing workshop and storage space. Toilets are located under the brick porches.

The tiled hipped roof which follows the stepped facade is ventilated by a centrally positioned octagonal fleche and features small gables terminating the main ridge.

A series of retaining walls with concrete steps divide the level of the school buildings from the lower part of the grounds. A fenced garden has been created in front of main building. The concrete swimming pool with brick change shed at the eastern end is located on the southern side of the oval. The pool is surrounded by raked timber seating on the other three sides. Mature trees are located throughout the grounds especially along the street frontages.

== Heritage listing ==
Windsor State School was listed on the Queensland Heritage Register on 1 August 1994 having satisfied the following criteria.

The place is important in demonstrating the evolution or pattern of Queensland's history.

The buildings of Windsor State School Campus and their functions illustrate changing government attitudes to education requirements over nearly 8 decades. The 1915–1916 school building was built to accommodate the requirements of the most modern of education philosophy in Queensland. Design features include verandah access, an emphasis on natural lighting and ventilation in design, and undercroft playspaces. The 1934 building was purpose-designed to accommodate infant grades, and includes internal circulation, flexible classroom space, and undercroft play area.

The place is important in demonstrating the principal characteristics of a particular class of cultural places.

The buildings of Windsor State School Campus and their functions illustrate changing government attitudes to education requirements over nearly 8 decades.

The place is important because of its aesthetic significance.

The wide frontage of the 1916 building with its distinctive towers and elevated position in grounds sweeping down to Lutwyche Road contribute to its prominence as a landmark in the Windsor area. The organisation of this building, articulated into horizontal verandahed wings with attached vertical elements, and the picturesque composition of its facades displaying multiple roof profiles, a mixture of materials including tiles, brickwork, shingles and render, bullseye and arched openings and scenically placed external stairs, associate the school with Arts and Crafts design popular at the time. The 1934 building complements, through its siting and the use of similar materials and decorative motifs, the earlier building. A high quality of construction and detailing characterises both buildings.

The place has a strong or special association with a particular community or cultural group for social, cultural or spiritual reasons.

A reflection of changing demographic trends in the Windsor area since it was opened, the school has played an active social and educational role in that community since 1916.
