= Geissmann =

Geissmann is a surname. Notable people with the surname include:

- Hilda Geissmann (1890–1988), Australian botanist, naturalist and photographer
- Joël Geissmann (born 1993), Swiss footballer
- Oliver Geissmann (born 1978), Liechtensteiner sport shooter
