= Charles Arthur Ford Whitcombe =

British architect (1872–1930)

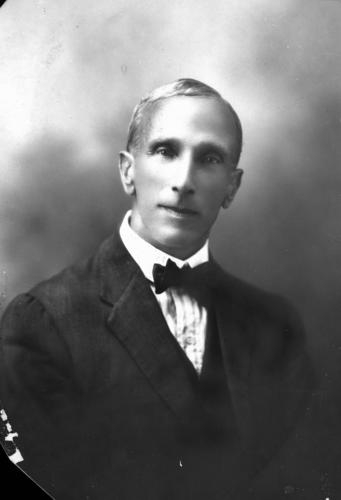
Charles Arthur Ford Whitcombe, A.R.I.B.A.

Charles Arthur Ford Whitcombe (1872-1930) A.R.I.B.A. was a British architect, best known for his ecclesiastical designs. He was from Tibberton, Worcestershire and had his London office at 5 Newman Street, Oxford Street. In 1916 he emigrated to Queensland, Australia to become 'Chief Instructor - Architecture' at the Central Technical College, Brisbane.

== List of work ==
=== United Kingdom ===
- 1896 Chapel of St Mary's Convent, Chiswick, London.
  - Picturesque chapel with a small tower, in a free arts and Crafts Gothic. Classical reredos. Ceiling paintings by George Ostrehan; tapestry panel by Morris & Co.
- 1900 Church of St James Huddington, Worcestershire
- 1900–01 Church of St Michael Huddington, Worcestershire
- 1902–05 Church of Holy Trinity Ettington, Warwickshire
- 1902–06 Church of All Saints Huthwaite, Hucknall, Nottinghamshire.
  - The new church built on the Common and Sutton Roads, Hucknall, Huthwaite [sic], has been erected from designs by Mr C. Ford Whitcombe, of London. The style is that of the fourteenth century period of English Gothic, and the building will seat 500 people.
- 1903 Church of Christ Church Broadheath, Worcestershire
- 1903 Church of St John the Baptist and St Felix Felixstowe, Suffolk
  - Pulpit 1903 by Whitcombe and Cogswell.
- 1903–05 Church of St Andrew Hampton, Worcestershire
- 1903–05 Church of St John the Baptist Feckenham, Worcestershire
- 1904–05 Church of St Mary Herbrandston, Pembrokeshire
- 1905–07 Church of All Saints Chadshunt, Warwickshire
- 1905–08 Church of St John the Baptist Farnham Common, Buckinghamshire
- 1905–08 Church of St Mary Magdalen Himbleton, Worcestershire
- 1905–08 Church of St Barnabas Southfields, London
- 1906 Church of St Andrew Cleeve Prior, Worcestershire
- 1906 Church of St Michael Huddington, Worcestershire
- 1909 Church of St John Helen's Bay, Belfast, in partnership with William Gerald St John Cogswell.
- 1909 The Church of St Peter Rugby, Warwickshire.;
- 1909 The Church of St Matthew Buckley, Flintshire.
  - A three-light window depicting St Anne teaching her daughter Mary, St Hilda teaching in her monastery at Whitby, and St Monica teaching her son Augustine.
