= Brisbane Central Technical College =

Heritage-listed building in Brisbane, Queensland

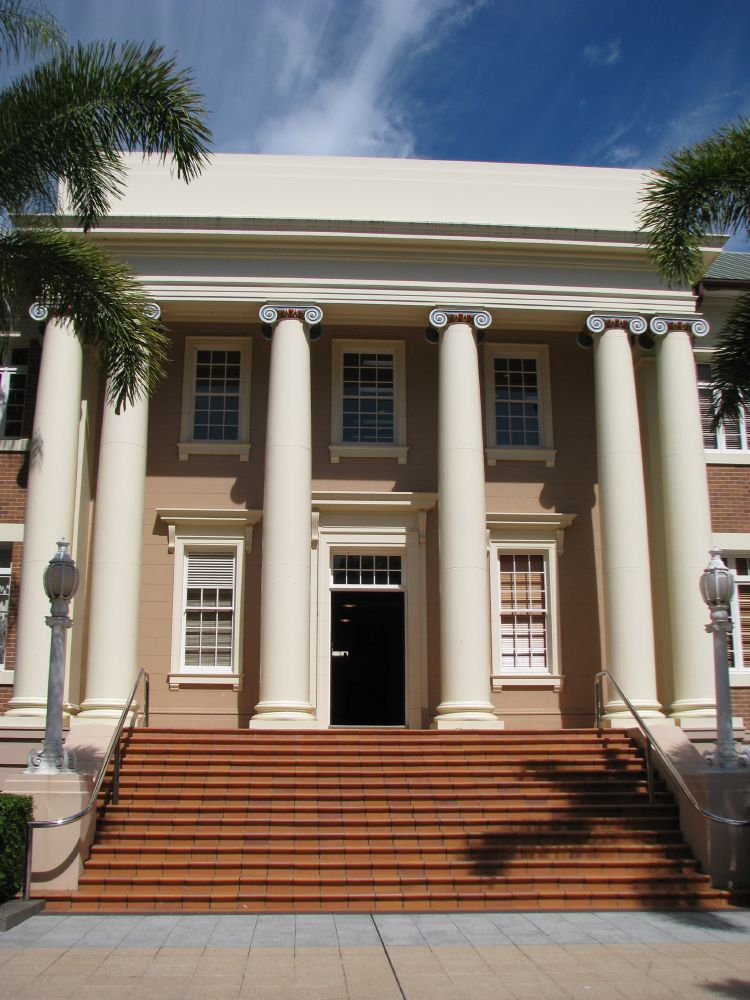
- Former Brisbane Central Technical College, 2008

- Location within Queensland Location within Australia
- 27.4767°S 153.0282°E
- Location: 2 George Street, Brisbane City, City of Brisbane, Queensland, Australia

History
- Design period: 1900–1914 (early 20th century)
- Built: 1911–1956

Queensland Heritage Register
- Official name: Brisbane Central Technical College (former), Queensland Institute of Technology (1965–1987), Queensland Institute of Technology (QUT 1987 to present), University of Queensland
- Type: state heritage (built)
- Designated: 27 August 1999
- Reference no.: 601728
- Significant period: 1910s–1950s (historical); 1910s–1950s (fabric); 1910s ongoing (social)
- Significant components: classroom/classroom block/teaching area, school/school room, workshop

Brisbane Central Technical College is a heritage-listed technical college at 2 George Street, Brisbane City, City of Brisbane, Queensland, Australia. It was built from 1911 to 1956. It became the Queensland Institute of Technology (QIT) in 1965, and then in 1987 that became the Queensland University of Technology (QUT 1987 to present). It was added to the Queensland Heritage Register on 27 August 1999.

The college was founded in 1908, and eventually became the Queensland Institute of Technology. While not able to grant bachelor's degrees, the college was able to issue diplomas which gave the recipients the right to "letters" after their name. In 1987 it became Queensland University of Technology and could award bachelor's degrees as well as higher degrees such as Master and Doctorates.

== Institutional history ==
Brisbane Central Technical College had its origins in the North Brisbane School of Arts and Mechanics' Institute opened in 1849. However, the technical college did not get properly underway until April 1881 when there were 22 enrolments for industrial art classes. Housed within the Brisbane School of Arts Building in Ann Street, the college was fully funded by student fees. The following year the technical college officially opened on 4 September 1882. The Department of Public Instruction provided grant funding from 1882. A separate building to house the college was completed in 1884.

Initially, the college was administered by a sub-committee of the School of Arts Committee. However, by 1898, the college had grown to such an extent that it was decided to approach the government to bring in legislation to create a technical college independent of the School of Arts Committee. This resulted in the Brisbane College Incorporation Act of 1898 which came into operation on 1 January 1899 under which an independent college council was established, separate from that of the School of Arts.

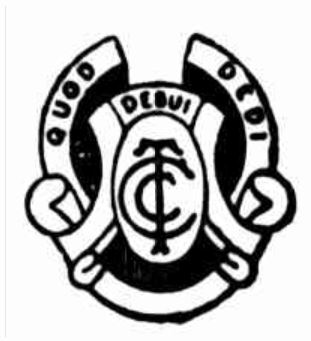
Crest of the Central Technical College, Brisbane, adopted circa 1906

From 1901, Public Instruction Department inspectors visited all technical colleges to ensure that government subsidies were being spent appropriately.

From September 1902, the college was supervised by the newly formed Board of Technical Education.

Circa 1906, when the college was in Ann Street (opposite the Brisbane School of Arts, it choose a crest with the Latin motto "Quod Debui Dedi" ("I pay what I owe").

Under the Technical Instruction Act 1908 which came into effect on 1 August 1909, the College was amalgamated with the South Brisbane Technical College and the West End Technical College to form Central Technical College, Brisbane. It also brought the newly formed Central College under the direct control of the Minister for Public Instruction.

The College moved to new quarters on the Old Government House site in November 1914.

Between 1920 (circa year) and 1924, the College housed students from Brisbane State High School (formerly Brisbane Junior High School). During this period, the College comprised three high school departments, namely: Commercial High School, Domestic Science School, and Technical High School. In the 1920s, these departments received the status of State High Schools.

After 1965, the college was gradually phased out and replaced by a number of technical colleges with a focus on apprenticeship training at South Brisbane, Eagle Farm, Yeronga, Kangaroo Point, Seven Hills, Ithaca, Coorparoo and Milton. The college at Gardens Point closed in 1974, to be replaced in January 1965 by the Queensland Institute of Technology, which provided higher-level professional diplomas in engineering, chemistry, architecture, building, and management studies. In January 1989, the institute became the current Queensland University of Technology.

== History of the college buildings ==
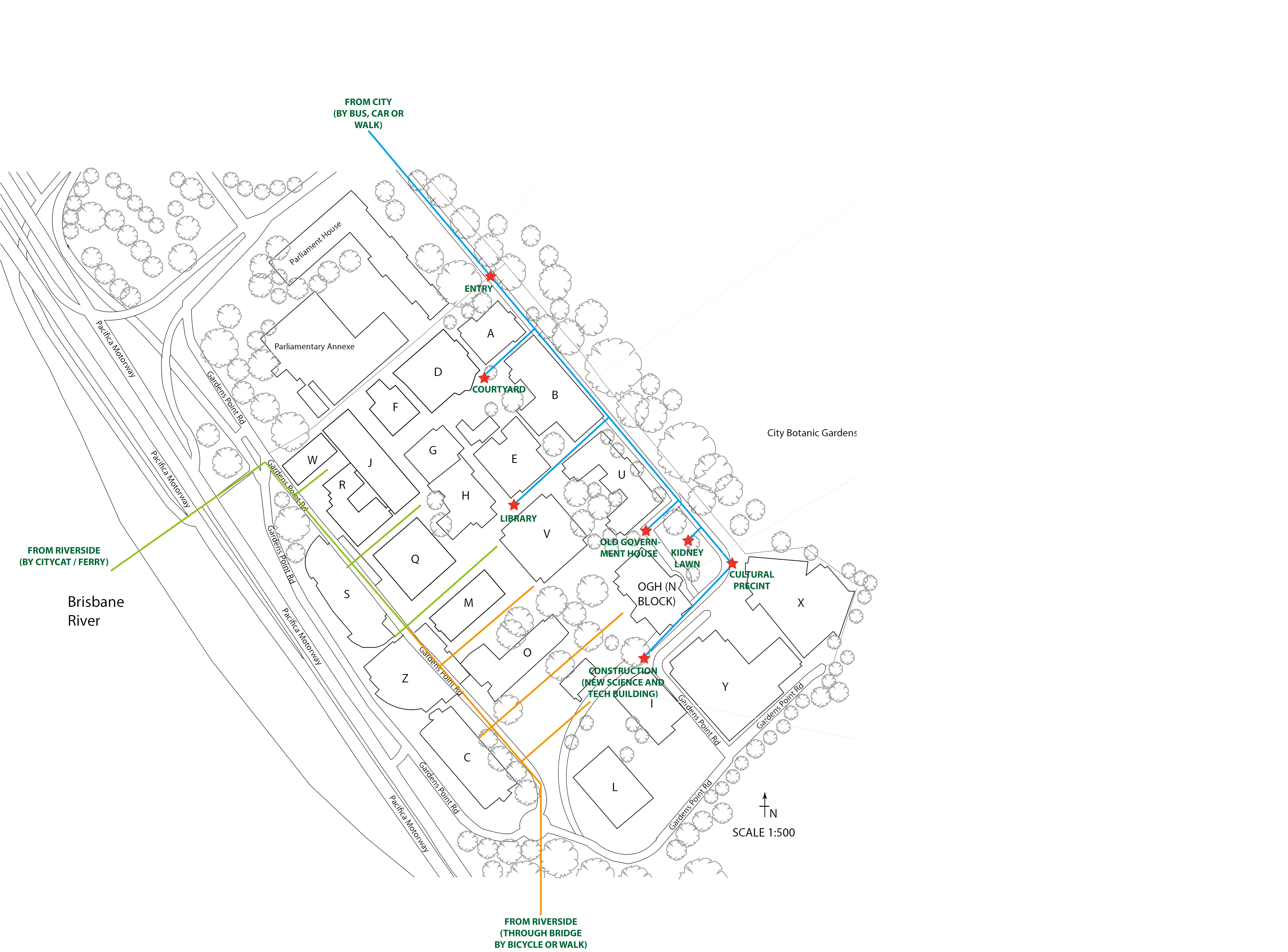
Map of Queensland University Technology Gardens Point campus, 2012

Originally a group of nine, free-standing, bold, red facebrick buildings grouped around a central courtyard, the former Brisbane Central Technical College was designed in 1909 and opened for classes in 1915. Located at the southeast end of George Street, the former Brisbane Central Technical College occupies the northwest portion of the Gardens Point Campus of the Queensland University of Technology (QUT) adjacent to Parliament House. The QUT Campus is located on a former government reserve which was worked as the government garden from 1825 and became the Government House Domain in 1860 with Old Government House (as it is now known) being the residence of the Queensland Governor. In 1909 the Governor removed to Fernberg, Bardon (the current Government House) and the Domain then accommodated the newly established institutions of the University of Queensland and the Brisbane Central Technical College. Old Government House became the main building of the University of Queensland and a group of nine purpose-built buildings was constructed to the northwest for the Brisbane Central Technical College.

In nineteenth century Australia, technical colleges were established by Schools of Arts or Mechanics Institutes. Technical education classes commenced in Brisbane in the 1870s, administered by the Brisbane School of Arts which established the Brisbane Technical College in 1882. Classes were conducted in a purpose-built extension to Brisbane School of Arts in Ann Street and in various other rented premises throughout the city. From 1900 there was insufficient suitable accommodation available to cater for increasing student numbers. Though nominally private institutions, technical institutes received funding from the Queensland Government and, as Government involvement in technical education increased in the early twentieth century, technical education was absorbed into the Department of Public Instruction. During 1907 the department investigated the establishment of a central technical college, reviewing models for similar enterprises in America and Britain. Under the Technical Instruction Act 1908 the Brisbane Technical College, South Brisbane Technical College and West End Technical College were amalgamated to form the Brisbane Central Technical College.

There was strong support for technical education in Queensland and this was the only Australian state to plan and construct a complex of buildings for a technical college. Sketch plans for nine two-storey buildings grouped around a central courtyard, linked with covered ways were prepared by the Department of Public Works in 1909. Designed as a cohesive group of similar scale and materials, eight buildings are arranged in a square with three facing the main drive to Old Government House. The ninth building, the Workshops block, is set back towards the river closing off the courtyard. Following an American model for technical education, the main departments of the college were assigned a dedicated building.

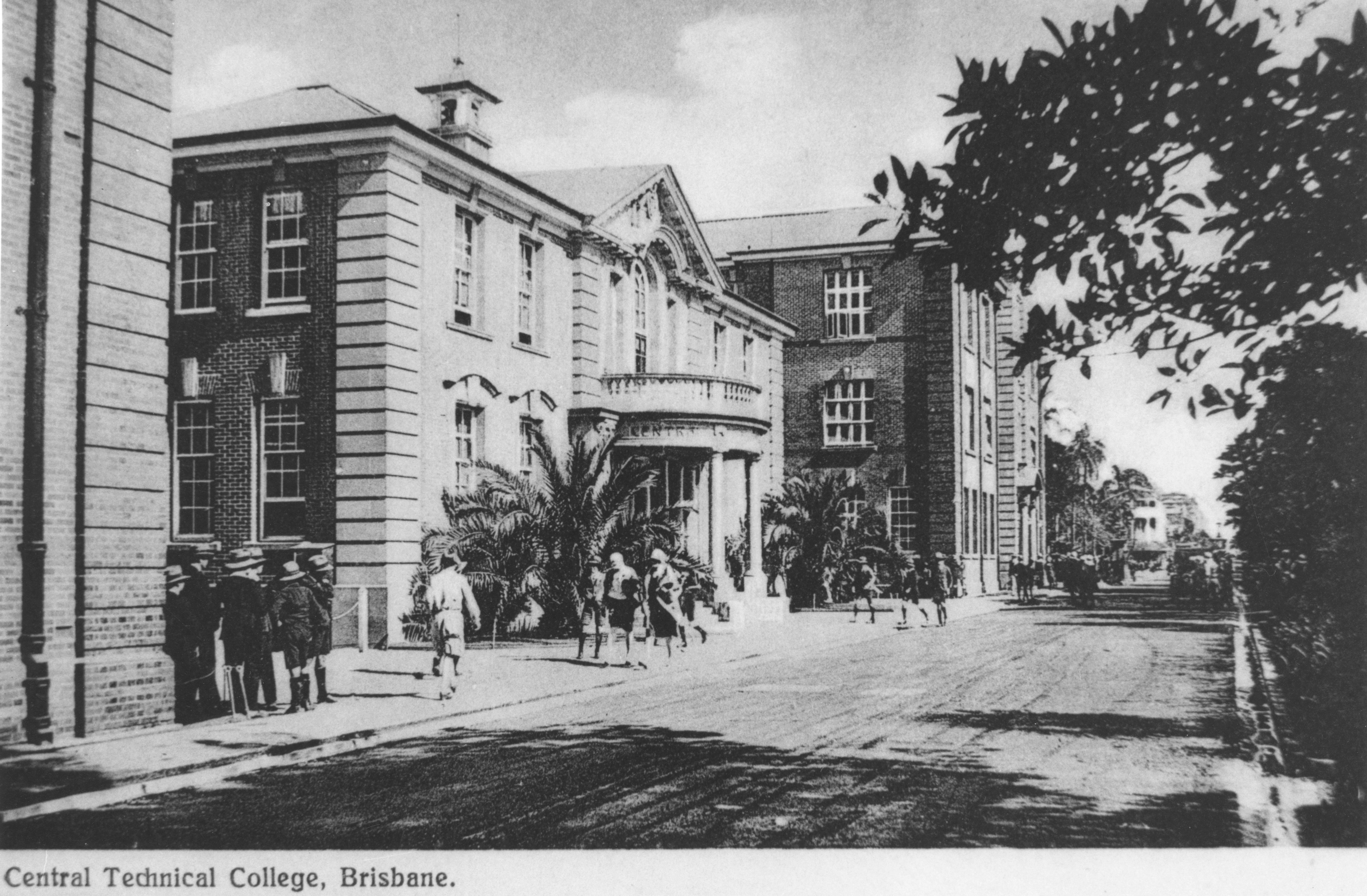
Former B Block, circa 1931 (demolished)

The construction was undertaken in two sections. A tender for £64,060/16/3 from contractor James Mason was accepted in March 1911 for the six buildings included in Section One:

- B Block : Administration and Examination Hall
- E Block : Chemistry and Geology
- F Block : Wool-classing and Building Construction
- G Block : Physics and Electrical Engineering
- H Block : Civil and Mechanical Engineering
- J Block : Workshops

In July 1912, James Mason successfully tendered £37,630/16/3 for Section Two which included the remaining three buildings of the campus:

- A Block : Commercial School
- C Block : Art School
- D Block : Domestic Science

Amendments were made to the original scheme during construction, including the addition of an extra storey to the Physics and Electrical Engineering building to accommodate the teaching of Biology. The covered ways to the ground and first floor levels were not built. The corridors within the buildings and the location of the building entrances reflect the circulation and physical relationships proposed in the original master plan. Building progress was hampered by strikes and materials shortages but the Brisbane Central Technical College was finally opened for classes in February 1915.

In response to increased demand for technical education following both World Wars, extensions to J Block Workshops were constructed. K Block, a three-storey extension to J Block Workshops was constructed in 1919 to accommodate returned soldier retraining classes. Responding to increasing apprenticeship enrolments a further three-storey extension, R Block, was constructed in 1928 accommodating the Industrial High School. Later infill linked R and K Blocks. W Block, a four-storey addition to the J Block Workshops completed in 1956, though planned forty years after the original Brisbane Central Technical College buildings is similar in materials and expression.

In addition to the Workshop extensions other additions and alterations have occurred to the Brisbane Central Technical College. S Block, erected adjacent to F Block in 1921 as a college store and later incorporated into F Block, is now demolished. An additional storey was added to A Block to accommodate Art, Architecture and Building in about 1924. Throughout the 1920s enrolments at both the University of Queensland and the Brisbane Central Technical College steadily increased. Although plans were underway to transfer to the St Lucia campus, a building was constructed to commemorate the 25th anniversary of the foundation of the university and was shared by both institutions. The building accommodated the Library of the university and various facilities for the Technical College. An imposing three-storey facebrick building in a restrained neo-Georgian idiom, the Library faced the Main Drive between Old Government House and the Art School (C Block, demolished 1978–79).

Although altered and extended over the years, the Brisbane Central Technical College represents an important era in education in Queensland and is the most extensive group of technical college buildings of the period. A major undertaking for the Queensland Government, the construction of the Brisbane Central Technical College was the largest building project for the Department of Public Works immediately prior to World War I. The architectural work of the Department of Public Works in the first decades of the twentieth century was of a high quality with many talented architects working in the office including Thomas Pye, Charles McLay, John Smith Murdoch, George Payne and Andrew Irving. Alfred Barton Brady was Government Architect and Thomas Pye, Deputy Government Architect. Brady administered the office and supervision of design was carried out by Pye. Pye was the driving force in developing and maintaining the office style after 1906 following the departure of Murdoch. Responsibility for individual projects within the department was seldom clear-cut but evidence in the departmental files suggests that Pye had a major influence on the design of the Brisbane Central Technical College. The department was responsible for the plans, specifications and construction of other contemporary technical colleges including Rockhampton Blocks A and E (Block A being now heritage-listed), Warwick, Mackay, Toowoomba Technical College, Queen Victoria Silver Jubilee Memorial Technical College (Ipswich) and Mount Morgan which were single buildings accommodating the whole college under one roof. All the technical colleges share stylistic details, construction and general architectural expression.

The former Brisbane Central Technical College was absorbed into the Queensland Institute of Technology in 1965 which was reconstituted as the Queensland University of Technology in 1987.

Blocks B and C were demolished in 1978/79 and Block D was demolished in 1998. Replacement buildings have been inserted for the demolished B, C and D Blocks. A new B Block, a rectangular, four-storey concrete and brick building, was erected in 1981. Completed in 1998, a steel and concrete structure projects into the courtyard from the former D Block site. A rectangular concrete, steel and glass cafe kiosk has been inserted into the courtyard to the east of G Block in 1999. The 1981 B Block, the 1999 D Block and cafe kiosk are not considered to be of cultural heritage significance.

In 1999 six buildings of the original group remain (A, E, F, G, H and J Blocks), along with the three extensions to the Workshops J Block (K, R, and W Blocks) and the later addition to the technical college campus, U Block. In the period 1995–1999 there has been extensive refurbishment undertaken to Blocks A, J and U.

== Description of the college buildings ==
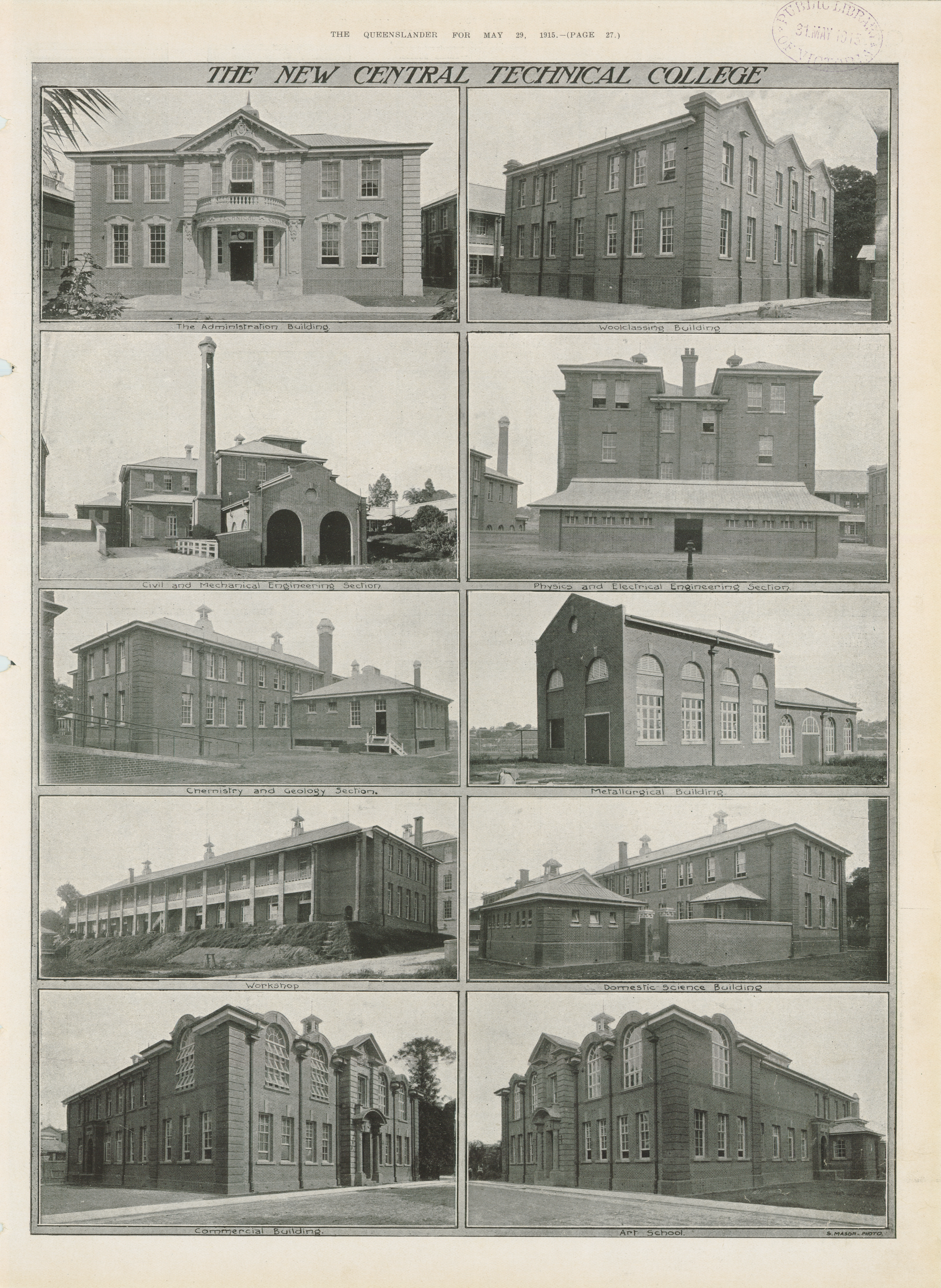
Brisbane Central Technical College, 1915

Overlooking the City Botanic Gardens, the former Brisbane Central Technical College sits between Parliament House and Old Government House at the southeast end of George Street. From a group of nine purpose-built buildings designed and constructed for technical education classes between 1909 and 1956, six, bold, red facebrick buildings remain from the 1909 master plan along with three extensions to the original Workshops block. A later addition, the imposing, two-storey, red facebrick neo-Georgian former Library building (U Block) faces the Main Drive adjacent to the kidney lawn of Old Government House.

Blocks A, E, F, G, H and J with its extensions Blocks K, R and W, are buildings of two to four storeys of an industrial character in a confident, restrained, simplified classicism characteristic of the Arts and Crafts idiom. The buildings are grouped around the original central courtyard now paved and landscaped with planted beds. A Block faces the Main Drive and is a landmark building at the main entrance gate to the campus. E, F, G and H blocks are grouped around the courtyard. J Block and extensions form a visual and physical close to the courtyard and are on the alignment of the roadway to the rear of the campus. U Block extends down the Main Drive preserving the alignment of the original master plan along this roadway.

Blocks A, E, F, G, H and J are unified in their general elevational treatment, materials and detailing. All are red facebrick with contrasting features in dark red brick including relieved quoining, arched entrance porches, flat arched window heads and banding to floor levels. The original building department name appeared in metal lettering in an Art Nouveau style within a carved stone tablet above the entrance porch to each building. Only "Chemistry" on the east entrance to E Block survives.

The central courtyard formed by the building group is a compact light, airy space. The pathways between the buildings provide visual and physical links with the courtyard and with the other buildings. The position of building entrances and corridors indicate the proposed circulation patterns that connect the buildings as a group.

The buildings, courtyard and surviving paths between the buildings of the former Brisbane Central Technical College precinct are of cultural heritage significance. Building descriptions for Blocks A, E, F, G, H, J, K, R, W and U follow.

== Commercial and Day School (A Block) ==
Constructed: 1912–1914, Additional storey: 1924 Architect: T. Pye

=== History ===
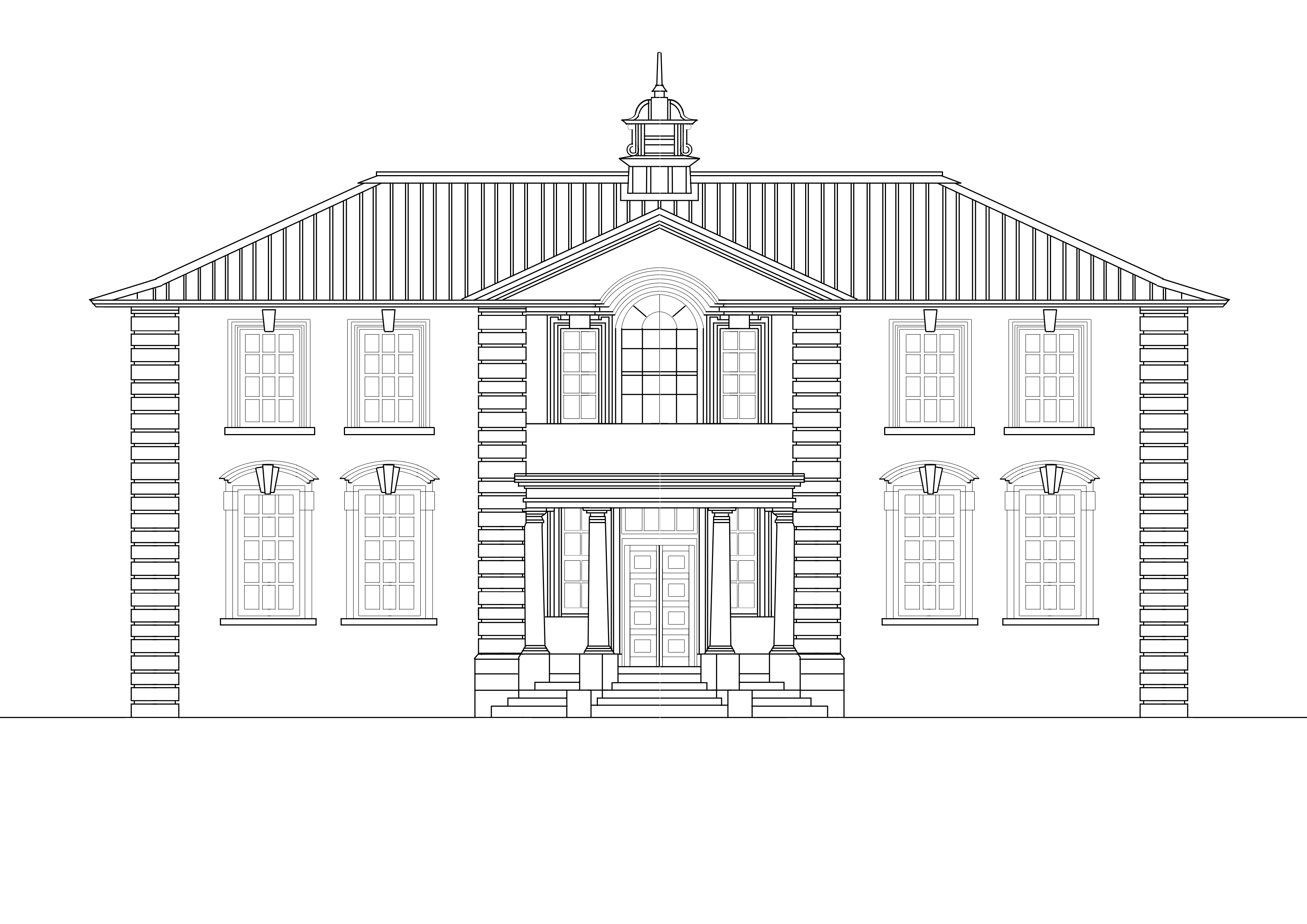
Elevation of A Block

A, B and C Blocks were designed as sentinel buildings to align with the Main Drive and to form the formal entrance to the Brisbane Central Technical College. A and C Blocks were almost mirror images and flanked the main building of the college, B Block. A Block was opened in 1915 as the Commercial and Day School and an additional storey following a similar plan to the earlier work was constructed in about 1924 to accommodate increasing enrolments. The Commercial High School was also accommodated in the building from 1933. The building interior has been altered, particularly during the refurbishment of 1996–1998, but the building form and exterior remain. Recent work has established walkway links envisaged in the original master plan. A Block now links with F Block at ground and first floor levels through the connecting gangways and passageways of the 1999 D Block.

=== Description ===
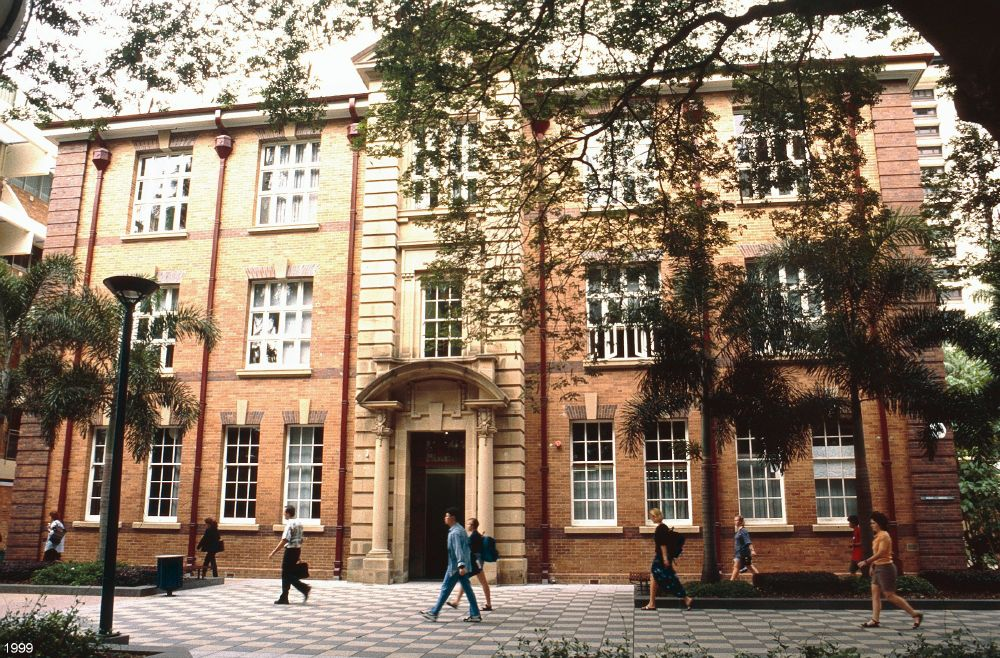
A block (now QUT A block), 1999

Adjacent to the Main Gate at the southeast end of George Street and on alignment with the Main Drive, the three-storey, facebrick, hip-roofed former Commercial and Day School overlooks the City Botanic Gardens. Each elevation is composed of light red facebrick with contrasting dark red facebrick relieved quoining, flat window arches and banding marking the floor levels. Prominent metal rainwater heads and downpipes divide the elevations into bays. The main elevation to the city Botanic Gardens is symmetrical about a narrow pedimented breakfront of dressed stone enriched with stone carving. The flat arched, central entrance porch with a prominent keystone in stone is flanked by posts with decorative carved shields to the capitals beneath an open-bed segmental pediment with decorative carving to the tympanum. A decorative metal grille fanlight sits over the porch entranceway. An arched porch entrance to the south opens onto the central courtyard and the arched entrance to the west connects with the new D Block undercroft link to F Block. There is a new metal bridge link across to B Block from the second floor. There are double hung windows to the ground floor of the front elevation with multi- pane casements to the upper floors. The other elevations have both double hung and multi-pane casement windows to each level.

Originally each floor accommodated classrooms and staff offices off a central corridor from east to west meeting a transverse corridor running along the rear wing from north to south connecting with the walkways which in the original master plan were to link with adjacent buildings. The internal spaces have been altered and are now organised off the original corridors as large studio spaces and smaller office spaces. Some original joinery remains, including six-pane glazed doors to the ground floor and nine-pane glazed doors to the first and second floors, skirtings to the corridors, high timber rails to A208, timber rails at two levels in A204. The original stair to the ground and first floors of polished concrete with exposed aggregate remains and continues in plain concrete to the c. 1924 extension second floor. A decorative steel balustrade with timber handrail runs along the whole stair.

== Chemistry and Geology (E Block) ==
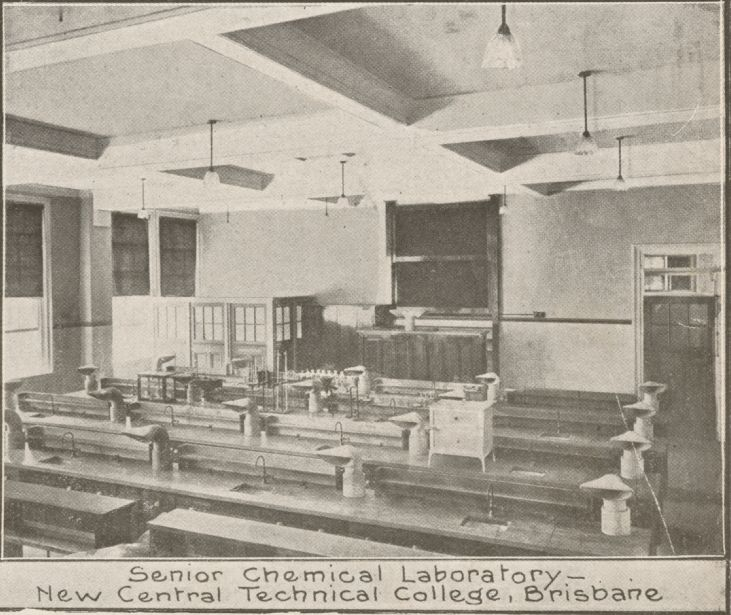
Chemistry (E Block), 1915

Constructed: 1911–1914. Architect: T. Pye Alterations and additions: 1932, 1937, 1960s, 1990

=== History ===
A two-storey L-shaped building with a rectangular pavilion across a walkway to the south, this building opened in 1915 to accommodate the Chemistry and Geology departments of the Brisbane Central Technical College. The building underwent alterations and additions in 1932, 1937, 1960s and 1990 and is now a U-shaped four-storey building with a southern wing. In 1932 alterations were undertaken to accommodate the Commercial High School; the northeast corner was added in 1937; an additional corner to the southwest and a third storey were constructed during the 1960s to accommodate classes for art and pharmacy; a fourth storey was added in 1990.

=== Description ===
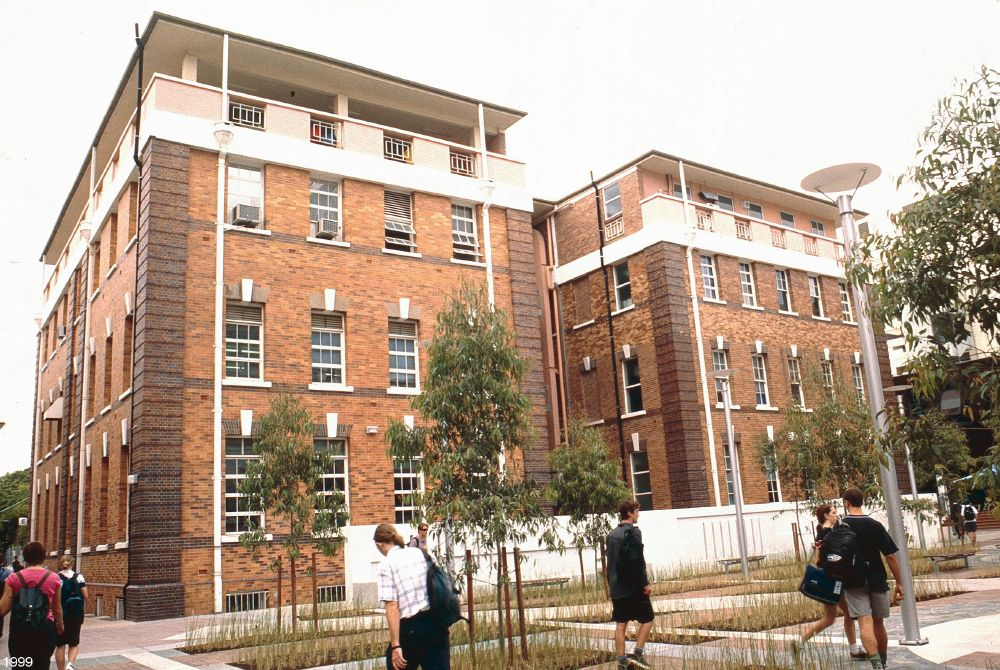
E block (now QUT E block), 1999

Block E is located to the south of the courtyard between Blocks B and G/H. Now four storeys, it has grown out of the former Chemistry and Geology building and is unified with the other buildings in the group in general elevational composition, detailing and materials. It is a plain building in light red facebrick with contrasting dark red facebrick to the relieved quoins, flat window arches and banding marking the interior floor levels. The only decoration is the Art Nouveau metal lettering "Chemistry" above the arched entrance porch to the east. The 1937 infill to the northeast continues the original elevational treatments and is well matched to the original while the 1960s addition to the southwest corner in light brick with no texturing or banding and smaller vertical fenestration is less sympathetic. The solid balustraded, setback upper-storey (1990) contrasts with the rest of the building and disturbs the building's cohesion with the group. A barrel-shaped, corrugated metal hood has been added over the steps to the east entrance porch.

The interior has been altered and is now a range of laboratories, lecture theatres, staff offices and ancillary service/storage/work areas arranged off the main east–west corridor of the original master plan. There are concrete stairs at each end. Some early fabric survives including the concrete stair with plain metal balustrading to the east, some joinery and stop chamfered concrete beams and posts to the ground floor. The interior walls are painted or plastered brick, with plain plastered ceilings and concrete floors (some with vinyl and carpet floor coverings). Suspended ceilings conceal plaster ceilings.

== Wool-classing and Building Construction (F Block) ==
Constructed: 1911–1914 Architect: T. Pye

=== History ===
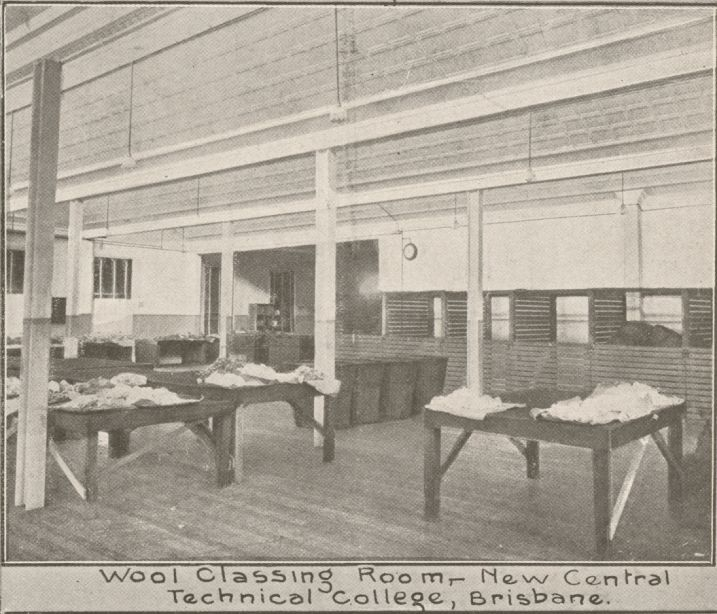
Wool Classing (F block), 1915

Opened in 1915 to accommodate classes for wool-classing, building construction and botany this two-storey building has a tough and distinctive industrial character. With the dedication of purpose-built classing facilities for the training of wool classers, the building demonstrates the importance of the wool industry in Queensland. The form and fabric of the building are substantially intact. During the mid-1990s alterations have been made to some of the internal spaces. The large wool classing room to the first floor is now partitioned into smaller studios and teaching spaces. The partitioning screens, with clear perspex to the upper portions, allow the filtered light from the saw toothed roofs to penetrate the space.

=== Description ===
The distinctive form of this building expresses the saw-toothed roof line in the north and south elevations. Unified with the other buildings in the group in scale, materials and detailing the elevational infill is in light red facebrick contrasting with the dark red facebrick of the flat arch window openings and the relieved quoining to the corners and pilasters which define the bays in the elevations. Prominent rainwater heads and downpipes contribute to the vertical rhythm. The arched entrance, now without the identifying building title within the tablet above, remains to the east and opens onto the undercroft of the new D Block which reinstates the link of the original master plan across to A Block. The timber entrance doors have been replaced with glass doors.

The plan is organised about an L-shaped corridor off which studios, workshops, staff offices and storage/service areas open. Some internal spaces have been partitioned but the original internal spatial relations have been maintained though service ducts and lighting fixtures now intrude. Original fabric survives including the roof lights and pressed metal ceilings to the level two former woolclassing area now partitioned as F204 and F201; decorative pressed metal ceilings, concrete columns in a Tuscan order and dentilled plaster cornices with egg and dart mouldings to the ceilings and exposed beams in F101; decorative pressed metal ceilings with moulded "acanthus" pattern cornices to the corridors of level two; decorative pressed metal ceilings to the vestibule to the link across to J Block from level 2; decorative plaster cornice to the ceiling of the stairwell; doors and skirting boards to each floor; tiles to floor and walls of locker rooms on each level; and a polished concrete stair with plain metal balustrading.

== Physics and Electrical Engineering (G Block) ==
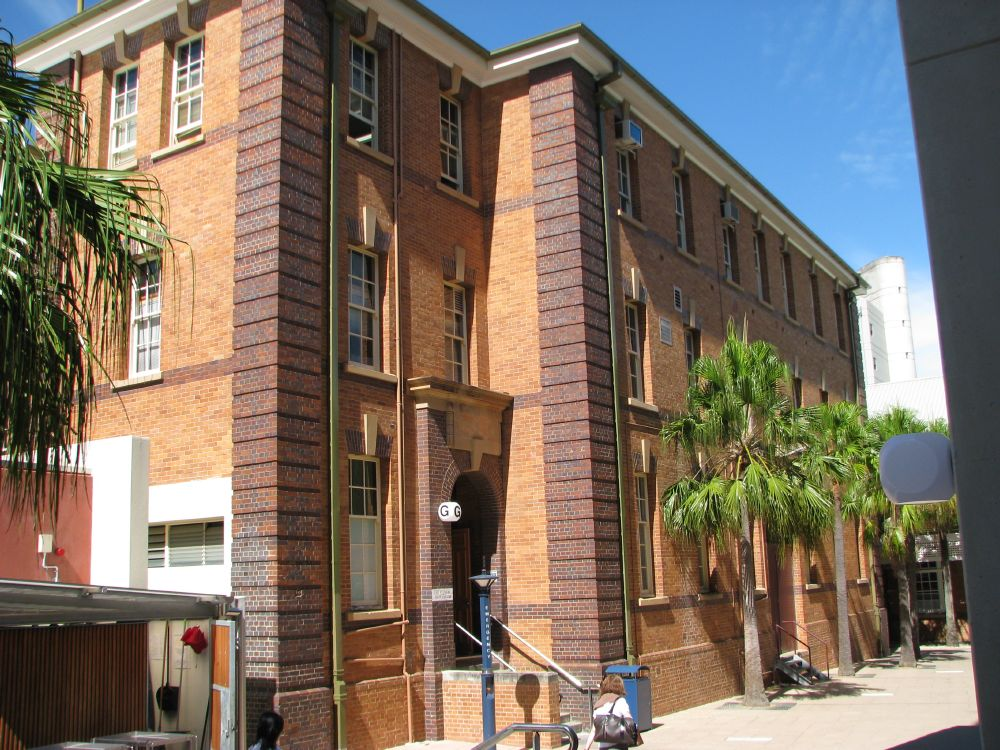
G block (now QUT G block), 2008

Constructed: 1911–14. Architect: T. Pye

=== History ===
A small, two-storey pavilion building to accommodate classes in physics and electrical engineering, an additional storey was constructed during the original building contract to accommodate classes in Biology. A single-storey toilet block was also erected to the northeast before the building was opened in 1915. This toilet block was demolished in the 1960s. The building accommodated the QIT library from the mid-1960s to 1977 and housed the School of Nursing during the 1980s. The glass and concrete infill connecting G and H blocks was inserted in 1990.

=== Description ===
Lying to the south of the courtyard, this is the smallest building in the group and is timber framed. A three-storey, hip-roofed, facebrick pavilion with a service wing to the east expressed as two towers, this building is unified with the other buildings in scale, detail and materials. The regular rhythm of flat arched windows around the building and the relieved quoining in dark red brick contrast to the light red infill panels of the building. Now removed, the former single-storey toilet block is evident in the rendered and painted lower portion of the external east wall. The building title has been removed from stone tablet above the dark red brick, arched entrance porch to the west.

Classrooms and staff offices open off a central corridor within the pavilion section of the building. Early fabric survives including timber lined ceilings and the cedar main staircase. An infill link of glass and concrete to H Block has diminished the reading of these buildings as separate structures.

== Civil and Mechanical Engineering (H Block) ==
Constructed: 1911–1914. Architect: T. Pye

=== History ===
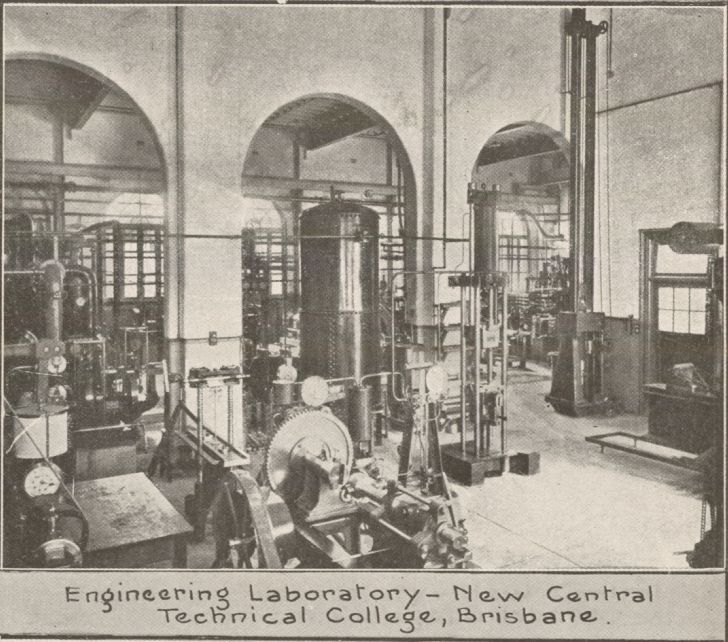
Engineering laboratory (H block), 1915

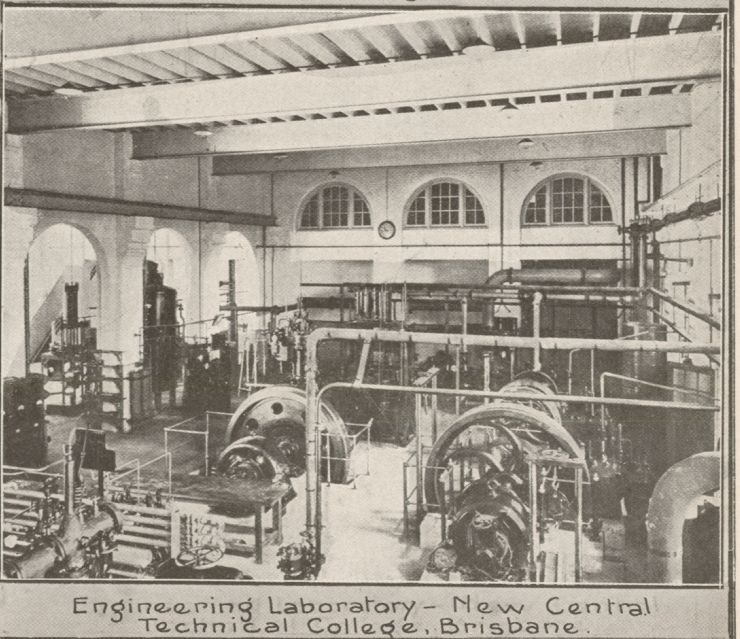
Engineering laboratory (H Block), 1915

Opened in 1915 the building was constructed to the design amended by Pye during the construction period. The amendments included the insertion of the oriel window to the south, a reconfiguring of the plan placing the main entrance in the southeast wing and elevational changes reflecting alterations to the plan. The Boiler Room and associated stack were demolished in the early 1970s and lecture rooms and storage rooms in the south wing were demolished in the late 1970s. Corrugated metal sheeting covers the rent in the building to the south. A concrete and glass infill wing was inserted between H and G Blocks in 1990.

=== Description ===
A two-storey, hip-roofed, facebrick square pavilion with a rectangular workshop wing stepping downhill to the west, this building is distinguished by its four-storey, rectangular tower. Elevational treatments and detailing are similar to those used in the other buildings in the group, including the relieved quoining, flat arched window openings and arched entrance porch in contrasting dark red brick. The machine room basement is distinguished by the semi-circular arched window openings in dark red brick to this level. A distinctive oriel window to the south contains the stair landing and links the pavilion wing to the rectangular west wing at first floor level. Hooks and other marks in the west exterior wall are evidence of the demolished Boiler Room and associated brick stack. Corrugated metal sheeting to the south wall covers the wall to the demolished south wing. Shadowing on the carved stone tablet above the arched entrance porch to the east indicates the original Art Nouveau style lettering "Engineering".

The interior has been altered but original fabric remains. The plan is organised about a central corridor with a polished plain concrete stair with metal balustrade in the south corner. The basement machine room is intact, retains a workshop use and is notable for the exposed timber structure of the floor above, arched brickwork and steel lifting beams (plated "Manchester 1912"). The room may be viewed from the ground floor corridor above through arched brick windows. The ceiling to this corridor and through to 209A is sheeted with decorative pressed metal with stylised acanthus moulded cornices. Decorative pressed metal ceilings remain in several rooms and corridors. Room 306 retains exposed timber trusses and decorative pressed metal ceilings; room 405 remains as a galleried lecture theatre with decorative pressed metal ceilings; glazed timber partitions remain in room 202.

== Workshops (also known as Trades Building) (J Block) ==
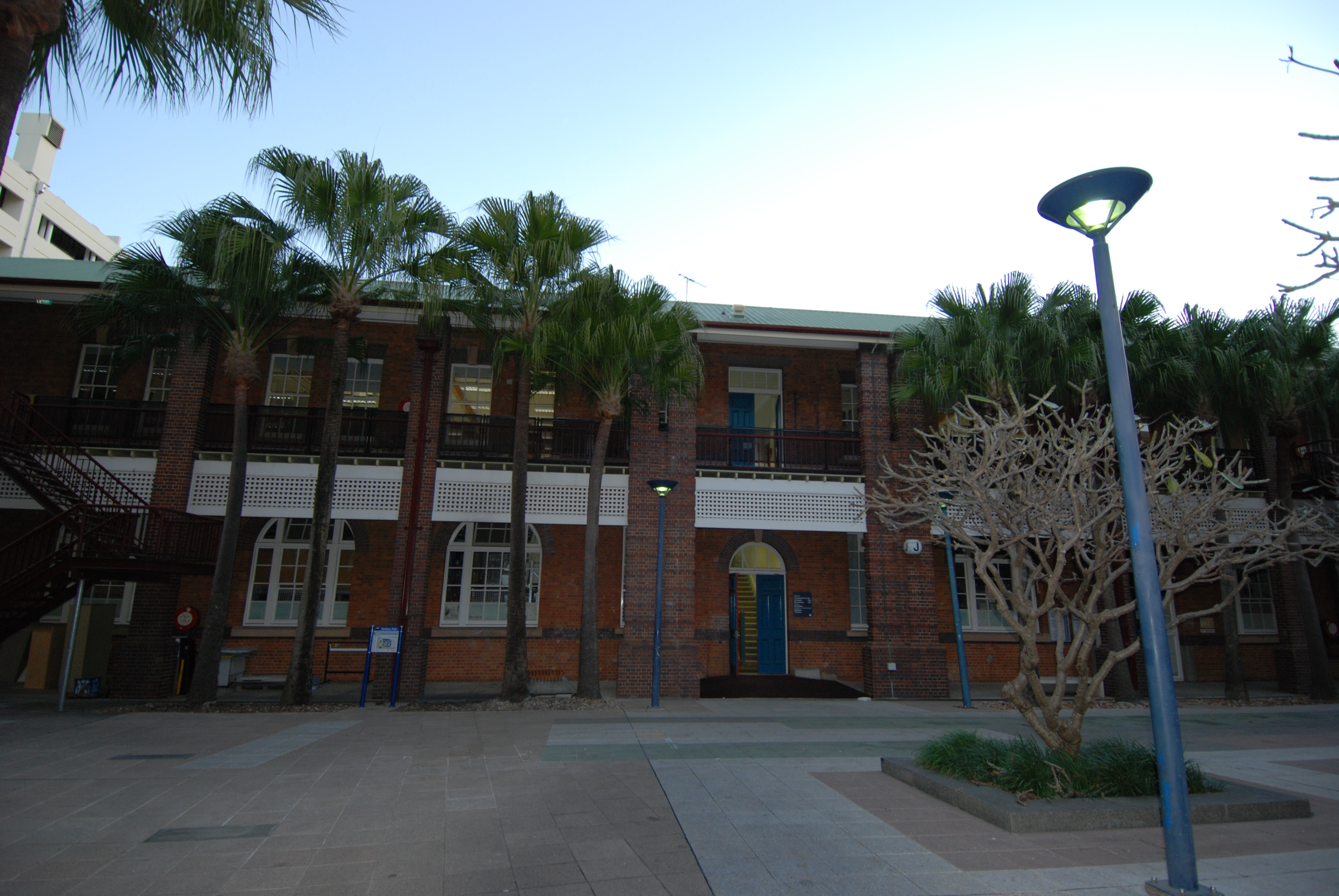
J Block, 2012

Constructed: 1911–1914. Architect: T. Pye Extensions: K (1920) A. Irving; R (1928–29) WH Gillies; W (1951–1956) MD Hamilton

=== History ===
Distinguished in plan form and massing from the other buildings in the group, J Block was opened in 1915 accommodating the trades workshops. The planning and siting of the building reflect the consideration given to massing and ventilation suitable for accommodating noisy and often hot workshops. Further pavilions (K block 1920, R block 1929, W block 1956) have been constructed west of J Block to accommodate additional workshops and teaching spaces. The first floor workshops have been altered during the 1996–98 refurbishment to accommodate architecture and interior design studios in a mezzanine inserted into these workshop spaces. The building retains its general planning arrangement.

=== Description ===
A long, rectangular, two-storey, facebrick building with a hip-roof drawn down over latticed lateral verandahs, the former Workshops building is sited west of F, G and H blocks and closes the courtyard visually to the west. Though different in form, the building is unified with the other buildings in the group in scale, detailing and materials. It is distinguished by dark red facebrick rusticated verandah columns which split to two thinner paired columns in the centre bay at first floor level. There also is contrasting dark red brick banding to sill levels, the flat arched double hung windows to the ground floor and segmental arched double hung windows with fanlights to the first floor. Symmetrical about a central service/circulation core, there are four workshops opening to both verandahs on each level. A timber and steel mezzanine structure is inserted in the first floor workshop spaces while retaining the original planning arrangement. Original fabric survives including window and door joinery; exposed timber trusses to the first floor workshops; and decorative pressed metal ceilings to the west verandah, rooms J205, J210, J211, J215, J110 and the stairwell. The central plain polished concrete stair with plain metal balustrading and timber handrail remains from the ground floor to the intermediate landing.

== Extensions to J Block ==
Blocks K, R and W have been erected to the west of J Block, all similar in style to the original group of buildings. A later infill link has been inserted between Blocks K and R.

=== Description ===
K Block is a simple rectangular, hip-roofed, three-storey, facebrick pavilion adjoining J block. Completed in 1920 it was designed to match and align with existing work. It features the regular fenestration rhythm of flat arched double hung windows of the earlier buildings in the group. The workshop spaces on each floor are now partitioned into smaller units.

Erected in 1929 to house the Industrial High School, Block R is a simple rectangular, hip-roofed, three-storey, facebrick pavilion linked to J Block by a gangway at the ground and first floor levels. Constructed on reinforced concrete piers and beam foundations, the basement floors are of concrete and the upper floors of timber. The planning of the building is altered from the original with workshops and classrooms now partitioned into smaller units. The stair to the west has been removed and vertical circulation for both K and R is now within the inserted link wing.

Completed in 1956, W Block is a four-storey, hip-roofed, facebrick building to the northwest of J Block. Of a similar character to the earlier building but only using light red brick, the W Block has a regular rhythm of paired double hung windows to the long elevations and incised brickwork to the corners. There have been alterations to the interiors but the general planning of workshops and teaching spaces remains. The concrete stair with metal balustrade to the west is intact.

== University of Queensland Library (now QUT U Block) ==
Constructed: 1935. Architect: N. Thomas

=== History ===
Opened in 1935 to house the University of Queensland Library, the building also accommodated various Central Technical College activities including part of the Commercial High School from 1938. Classes for architecture and building construction were conducted in the building. The administration of the newly formed QIT occupied the building in 1966 and during the 1960s and 1970s classrooms, the optometry clinic and the printery also operated out of this building. The south wing was refurbished during 1995/96 for the QUT Chancellery Offices (U block).

=== Description ===
Erected in 1935 U Block, adjacent to Old Government House, is a long, imposing, three-storey, facebrick building resting on a rusticated freestone base facing the Main Drive and overlooking the City Botanic Gardens. Symmetrical about a giant order Ionic portico entrance, the building is approached by a wide sweep of concrete stairs from the Main Drive. The main wing terminates in rectangular pavilions which extend to the west forming a courtyard to the rear of the building. Two sets of stairs parallel to the front elevation arrive at minor entrances to the front of each end pavilion. Giant order, rendered pilasters divide the front elevation into ten bays of flat arched, four-pane casement windows with fanlights. The other elevations have a similar rhythm of pilasters and fenestration and the blind west elevations of the pavilions are defined by paired rendered pilasters. The west elevation is symmetrical about a flat arched, freestone entrance porch below a double height vertical stairwell window.

A U-shape plan organised about a single-loaded corridor to the west of the main wing, the interior is now altered. The large open spaces in the pavilions have been partitioned and organised off a single loaded corridor to the courtyard side. Vertical circulation and services remain to the west of these pavilions. The gallery to the level two south pavilion has been removed. This area was refurbished into partitioned offices and meeting spaces for the QUT Chancellery in 1995/96. Internal fabric has been lost but early fabric remains including the casement windows to the perimeter of the building, front and rear entrance doors, doors to former seminar and storage rooms off the central circulation core, the columns in the entry vestibule and the sets of concrete stairs to the west of the main wing and to the pavilions. Decorative plaster flat arches remain to the central stairwell.

== Heritage listing ==
The former Brisbane Central Technical College was listed on the Queensland Heritage Register on 27 August 1999 having satisfied the following criteria.

The place is important in demonstrating the evolution or pattern of Queensland's history.

The former Brisbane Central Technical College, erected 1911–1915, is important for its association with the development of education in Queensland. As the centre of technical education in Queensland, the place is important in demonstrating the development of technical education in the State. The place is important for demonstrating on one site, major changes to technical education from 1900. In particular, the place is important for demonstrating the expansion of technical education in response to retraining requirements for returned soldiers from both World Wars and in response to increases in trade apprenticeships from the 1920s.

The Main Drive, which runs from the George Street entrance of the campus and terminates at Old Government House, is a significant element of the site. The driveway maintains a strong association with Old Government House as the traditional link between it and Parliament House and the government precinct and the city beyond. The Driveway is significant as an element of the Central Technical College and later, Gardens Point Campus with the buildings of the campus designed to address the driveway.

The place demonstrates rare, uncommon or endangered aspects of Queensland's cultural heritage.

The former Brisbane Central Technical College is important for demonstrating changes in Government involvement in financing and controlling technical education from 1900. The former Brisbane Central Technical College is important as the only technical college in Queensland designed and constructed as a complex of buildings.

The place is important in demonstrating the principal characteristics of a particular class of cultural places.

The buildings are fine examples of technical college structures of the early twentieth century constructed in response to progressive thinking in the design and planning of educational institutions.

The place is important because of its aesthetic significance.

The former Brisbane Central Technical College has aesthetic significance as a cohesive group of buildings unified by scale, design and materials. Landmark buildings at the southeast end of George Street, the group overlooks the City Botanic Gardens to the east and the Brisbane River to the west. Bold, facebrick structures with a tough industrial character enriched by discrete decorative stone carving, the buildings are characteristic of the Arts and Crafts idiom in form and detailing. The buildings are of considerable architectural merit and their form and fabric illustrate a skilled design approach. The buildings demonstrate a fine quality of workmanship in the detailing of materials and finishes.

The group is important for original fabric which survives, particularly F Block for its overall intactness and the machine room in H block for its intactness. A Block and U Block are important in preserving the campus alignment to the Main Drive. Both are important as landmark buildings defining the principle entry to the former Brisbane Technical College precinct. The courtyard and surviving pathways between the buildings are important in maintaining the integrity of the group of buildings. Further Block U provides evidence of the changing nature of the educational facility on the site.

The place has a strong or special association with a particular community or cultural group for social, cultural or spiritual reasons.

The former Brisbane Central Technical College is important for its association with students and teachers of the former Brisbane Central Technical College, the Industrial High School, the Commercial High School, the Queensland Institute of Technology and the Queensland University of Technology.

The place has a special association with the life or work of a particular person, group or organisation of importance in Queensland's history.

The former Brisbane Central Technical College is important for its association with the Department of Public Works. In particular, with the work of architect Thomas Pye who was responsible for the design of the original complex of nine buildings. The former Brisbane Central Technical College is important for the ability to demonstrate the work of the Government Architect's Office in relation to the design of substantial educational buildings.

== Notable people ==
=== Students ===
- Davida Allen, artist
- Brian Bell, pharmacist and businessman
- William Leslie Bowles, sculptor
- Donald Cowen, artist
- Hilda Geissmann, naturalist and photographer
- Bessie Gibson, artist
- Edwin Hayes, architect
- Gil Jamieson, artist
- Daphne Mayo, artist and sculptor
- Elina Mottram, architect
- Kathleen O'Brien, cartoonist
- Margaret Olley, artist
- Harold Parker, sculptor
- Lloyd Rees, artist
- Campbell Scott, architect

=== Teachers ===
- Richard Godfrey Rivers, artist
- Charles Ford Whitcombe, Chief Instructor (Architecture) from 1916 to 1930
