= Brisbane School of Arts =

Heritage-listed school in Brisbane, Queensland

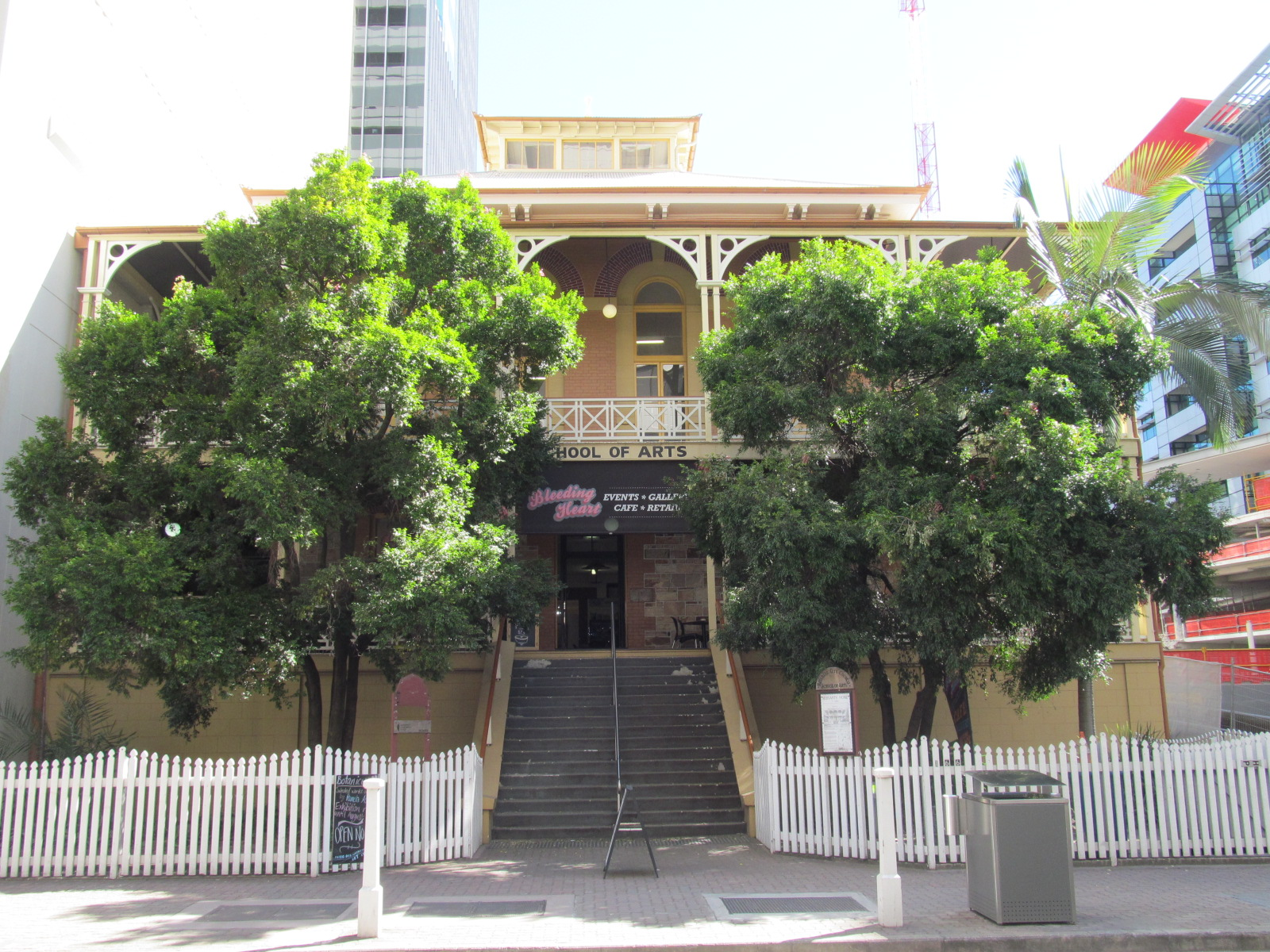
- School of Arts building in Brisbane, 2013

- Location within Queensland Location within Australia
- 27.4672°S 153.0245°E
- Location: 166 Ann Street, Brisbane City, City of Brisbane, Queensland, Australia

History
- Design period: 1840s–1860s (mid-19th century)
- Built: 1865–1985

Site notes
- Architectural style: Classicism

Queensland Heritage Register
- Official name: Brisbane School of Arts, Servants Home (former)
- Type: state heritage (built)
- Designated: 21 October 1992
- Reference no.: 600072
- Significant period: 1877–1940 (historical)
- Significant components: school of arts

Brisbane School of Arts is a heritage-listed school of arts at 166 Ann Street, Brisbane City, City of Brisbane, Queensland, Australia. It was built from 1865 to 1985. It is also known as former Servants Home. It was added to the Queensland Heritage Register on 21 October 1992.

== History ==
This building was erected in 1865–1866. Known as the Servants Home, it provided accommodation for single adult females who had migrated to Queensland and were awaiting employment as domestic servants. Designed by H Edwin Bridges, the building comprised a ground floor and two upper galleries. All four elevations were identical. A notable feature of the interior was the lantern above the void in the two upper floors which provided natural lighting to the building. A 6,000 imperial gallon (27,300 litre) tank under the roof serviced the building with water. The contractors were Messrs Butler and Forster.

In 1873 the property was purchased by the trustees of the North Brisbane School of Arts for £1,000. The building was let to tenants for several years before it was converted to a school of arts (a.k.a. mechanics' institute). In 1877 contractor Blair Cunningham added verandahs and other modifications designed by Richard Gailey for a cost of £1,377. The new School of Arts building was opened on 17 May 1878.

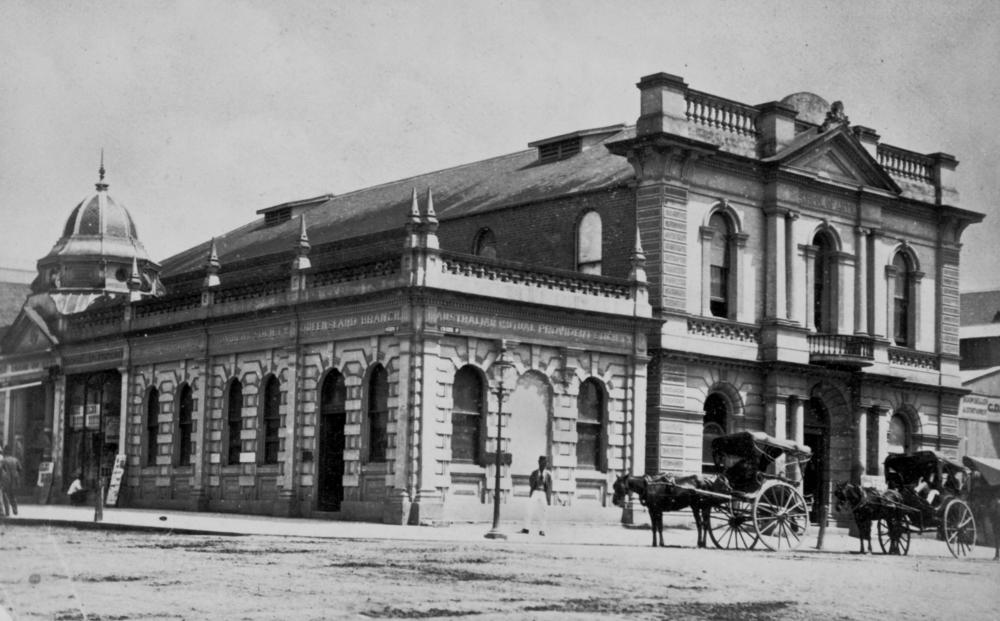
The first North Brisbane School of Arts Building, ca. 1877

The North Brisbane School of Arts was established in 1849 and its first premises were located on the corner Queen and Creek Streets. During the nineteenth and early twentieth centuries, it played an important role in the cultural life of the community. The School of Arts provided a library for members, conducted public lectures, and organised classes in a wide variety of subjects.

To meet the needs for technical education classes, a hall was added to the rear in 1884. This space was used for the Brisbane Technical College which operated under the auspices of the School of Arts until 1902 when the Queensland Government took responsibility for technical education.

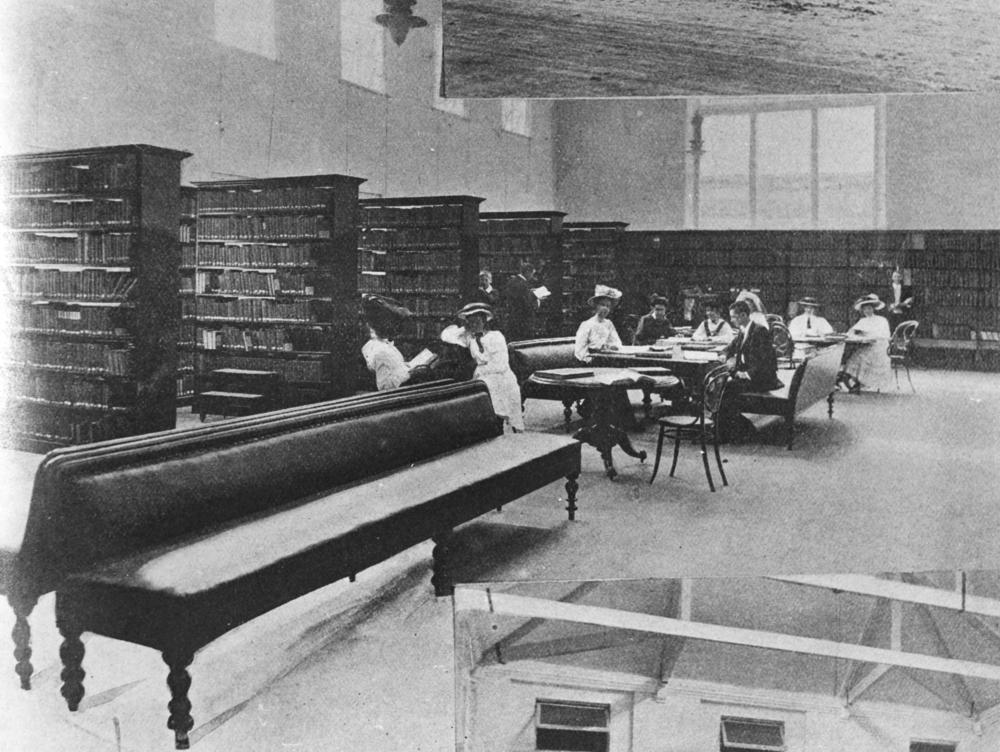
Interior view of the library at the Brisbane School of Arts, 1908

The lending library was a major activity of the School of Arts. In 1908, to make room for an increase in the number of books, an extension, designed by Messrs Atkinson and McLay, was built beside the hall.

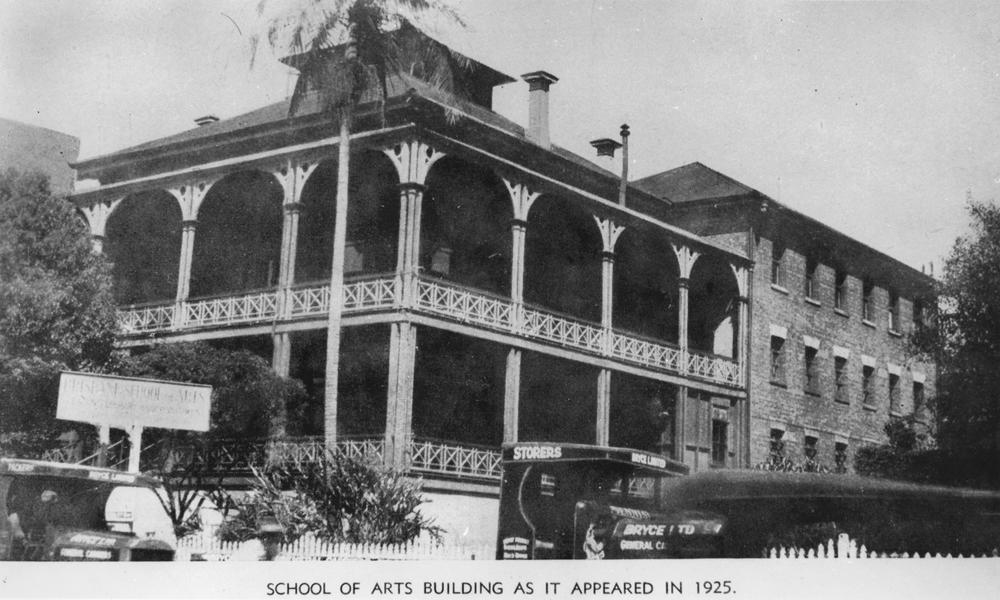
School of Arts building in Brisbane, 1925

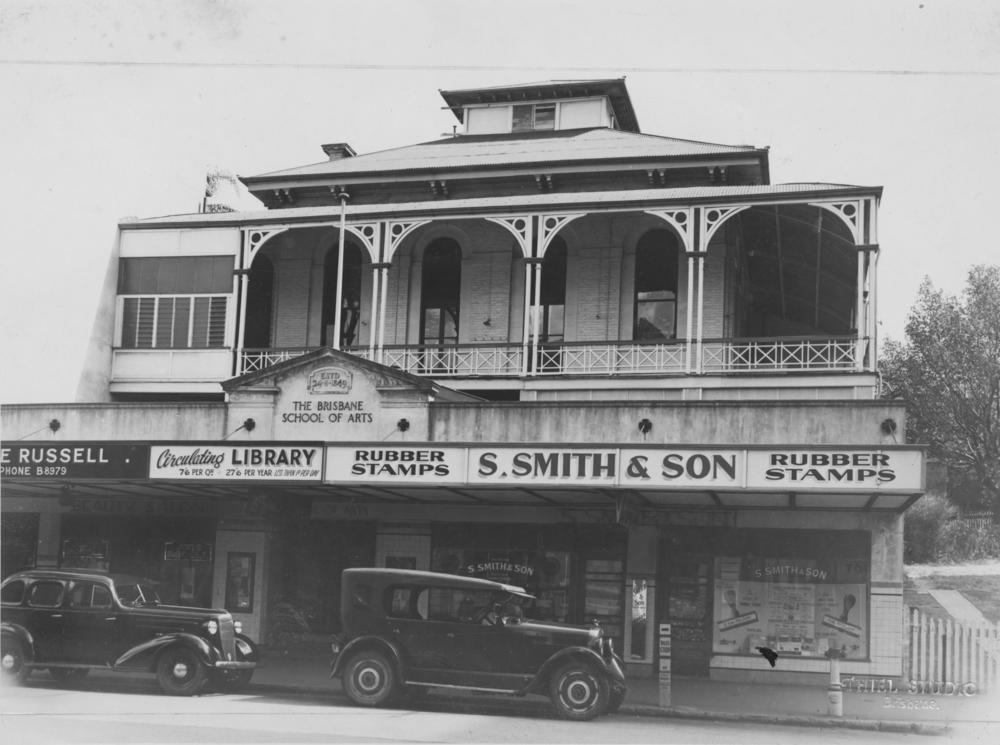
Shops added to the front, 1937

Membership of the School of Arts steadily declined during the 1920s and 1930s. To increase revenue, shops were built in front of the building in 1937. In 1955 a brick upper storey was added to the shops with connections to the School of Arts building. The verandahs were removed at this time.

In 1966 trusteeship of the property was transferred to the Brisbane City Council which continued to operate a public library at the site until 1981. In 1983 the front offices and shops were demolished and restoration work undertaken. The building was re-opened on 13 February 1985 and let to various community groups.

As of 2020 the property has been closed for several years pending renovations.

== Description ==
The School of Arts building is a two-storey masonry building elevated above Ann Street. The lower level is of coursed rubble masonry with red brick quoins and string courses. The upper two levels of the building are entirely brick, with the arched headed openings symmetrically arranged. The rolled iron hipped roof is surmounted by a 15 feet (4.6 m) lantern light with projecting eaves.

The entry stairs and front and side verandahs contain timber balustrades of diagonal crossed pieces and circular brackets below the eaves. The verandah roof drops in a shallow curve from below the eaves brackets of the main roof to its gutter line.

The double height lecture hall and three classrooms (1884) have face brick with timber floors, roof trusses, and corrugated galvanised iron roof. The library extension (1908) is constructed in a similar manner and consists of a double height room with a lantern roof light.

The building was restored in 1984–1985. Few interior fittings and furnishings remain, but the organisation of the internal space is relatively intact. Rooms on the ground floor are used for exhibitions while the first floor contains offices and a craft gallery. Original roof strutting is visible in the uppermost floor of the 1860s section and staircases and fireplaces have been retained. The tiered seating and balconies in the first floor of the lecture hall remain.

== Heritage listing ==
Brisbane School of Arts was listed on the Queensland Heritage Register on 21 October 1992 having satisfied the following criteria.

The place is important in demonstrating the evolution or pattern of Queensland's history.

The School of Arts is significant for its association with the North Brisbane School of Arts which played a prominent role in the cultural life of Brisbane during the nineteenth and early twentieth centuries.

The place demonstrates rare, uncommon or endangered aspects of Queensland's cultural heritage.

The building remains as a rare surviving example of an inner-city masonry building of the 1860s.

The place has a special association with the life or work of a particular person, group or organisation of importance in Queensland's history.

The School of Arts is significant for the successful integration of the extensions under various architects, especially the verandahs designed by Richard Gailey.
