= Kathleen O'Brien =

Australian artist (1914–1991)

- Born: 18 October 1914; Mackay, Queensland, Australia
- Died: 8 May 1991 (aged 76); Hazelbrook, New South Wales, Australia
- Occupations: Comic book/strip artist, commercial artist, book illustrator,
- Writing career
- Pen name: Kate O'Brien, Kath O'Brien
- Period: 1943–1984

Kathleen O'Brien (1914–1991), was an Australian comic book artist, book illustrator and fashion artist. O'Brien is most notable for her 1943 comic strip, Wanda the War Girl, the first Australian comic strip to present an account of life during and after World War II from a female perspective.

== Biography ==
Kathleen Mary O'Brien was born in Mackay, Queensland (in her grandfather's hotel) on 18 October 1914, the daughter of Patrick and Kathleen Mary O'Brien.

As a young girl, she travelled all over Australia with her parents, whilst her father prospected for gold, broke horses and worked in the outback. Her mother's interest in art inspired her to become an artist. O'Brien boarded at a Brisbane convent and studied art at the Brisbane Central Technical College, before moving to Sydney in 1937, where she studied for three years with noted Australian artist J.S. (John Samuel) Watkins (1866–1942).

In 1942, the editor of The Sunday Telegraph, Cyril Pearl, was looking for a new strip to replace Mary and Elizabeth Durack's Nungulla and Jungalla. Journalist, Bob Slessor, suggested to O'Brien that she think about coming up with something. Her idea was a girl in the armed services, Pearl liked the samples and asked her to prepare a strip for the paper.

Wanda is not a portrait of any real person, but she represents the spirit of Australian girls I know, who have done such wonderful work in uniform. I first thought of Wanda when I was watching a march of service girls. I spent days and nights sketching girls before I was satisfied I had found a true type of real Australian girl.

— Kathleen O'Brien (1943)

Wanda was a tough independent young, long-legged curveous redhead, whose series of adventures had her encountering Japanese soldiers and German spies. The early stories were written by journalist, Clifford William Brain, but O'Brien took over the writing of the strip after the war.

Professor Jane Chapman, in her 2011 lecture at Macquarie University, considers that Wanda was inspired by Tarpé Mills' comic strip, Black Fury (a syndicated American strip, which appeared in The Sunday Telegraph) and Jane by Norman Pett (which appeared in the UK Daily Mirror). According to John Ryan in his Australian Comic anthology, Panel by Panel, "O'Brien developed a unique style which resembled some of the work of William Dobell."

Wanda the War Girl first appeared in The Sunday Telegraph on 18 July 1943. Wanda was reputed to be more popular with school children than Superman. Wanda also had a similar appeal with servicemen, with her image often painted on the sides of tanks and planes.

After the end of World War II the strip was renamed Wanda and took on the mantle of an adventure/detective strip before it was abruptly terminated mid-story on 25 November 1991. O'Brien basing her storylines on books by Ashton Wolfe, the head of the French Sûreté, combining methods he detailed with current newspaper stories, thus Wanda was involved in struggles with black-marketeers, foreign spies and smugglers.

The strip was subsequently collected into several comic books. Wanda the War Girl was published as a one-shot by Consolidated Press, whilst The Wanda Comic was the first and the fifth in Consolidated Press' Supercomic Series.

At the same time, O'Brien worked as a commercial artist and book illustrator, illustrating twelve books, including Hans Christian Andersen's The Little Mermaid (1943), Australia's first unabridged version of Lewis Carroll's Alice's Adventures in Wonderland and Through the Looking Glass (1943), Ella Greenway's Peter Cat (1950) and Nourma Handford's Carloola Backstage: A Career Novel for Girls' (1956).

In 1947, she married Robert Blanche. O'Brien briefly taught art at Springwood Ladies College and had a notable career as a fashion artist. O'Brien's illustrations appearing in advertisements for Myer, David Jones, Georges and Farmers department stores.

Kathleen O'Brien (Blanche) died in her Hazelbrook home on 8 May 1991.
