= Donald Cowen =

Australian-American artist, sculptor and scientific illustrator

Donald Cowen (1920 – 1987) was an Australian-American artist, sculptor and scientific illustrator, whose work is featured in buildings and galleries in Australia and the United States.

== Early life ==
Donald Ross Cowen was born July 28, 1920 in Redcliffe, Queensland, the son of Errol Cowen and his wife Eileen Ross Brown. He studied art at the Brisbane Central Technical College (now QUT) instructed by Melville Haysom and won entrance to the School of the National Art Gallery of Victoria.

== Military service ==
Cowen enlisted in the Australian Army during WW2 and was discharged in 1946 with the rank of lieutenant. He participated in the Commonwealth Reconstruction Training Scheme offered to ex servicemen after the war, to continue his art studies.

In 1950, Cowen and another ex-servicemen artist Quentin Hole undertook a road tour of Queensland, exhibiting their art in towns such as Maryborough, Bundaberg, Mackay, Townsville, Proserpine. They returned to Brisbane where their work was displayed at the Johnstone Gallery. In 1951, Cowen and Hole were commissioned to create two murals featuring palaeontological history for the University of Queensland’s Geology Museum on the new campus at St Lucia, Queensland. Cowen travelled to London and Paris to continue his studies in the early 1950s and used this experience to design sets for the Twelfth Night Theatre’s production of the Mad Woman of Chaillot in 1952. His work was exhibited at the Macquarie Galleries Show of Sixes in 1954.

== Move to the United States ==
In 1959, Cowen moved to Tucson, Arizona with his father, after the death of his mother in 1957. Don Cowen exhibited his art in Tucson and Phoenix. He became a naturalised citizen of the United States and took up work as a staff scientific illustrator for the College of Optical Sciences in 1965. He continued to experiment in different media and his sculpture Light Moment was installed in the foyer of the University of Arizona, Tucson’s College of Optical Sciences. It features pyrex glass from the Corning Glass Works factory of New York. Cowen was commissioned to prepare the 9 foot x 17 foot mural, Man and the Universe which hangs in the Tucson Convention Center. His painting Archimedes and the Battle of Syracuse was commissioned by Professor Aiden Meinel and hangs in the Albert B. Weaver Sciences-Engineering Library at the University of Arizona.

Cowen retired in 1983 and continued working on his art as well as teaching. He died in Tucson, Arizona on April 1, 1987.
