= Hilda Geissmann =

Australian botanist, naturalist and photographer

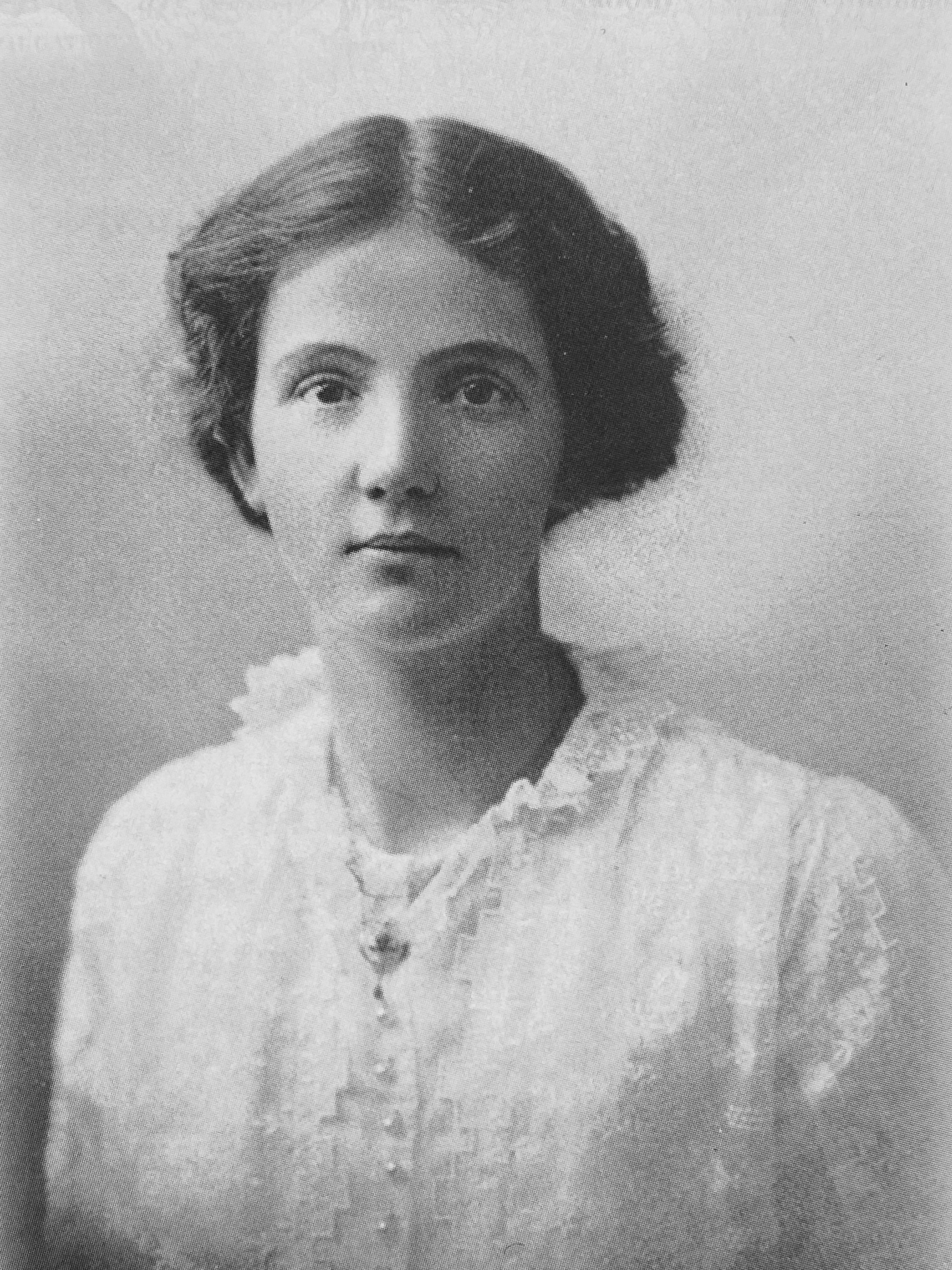
Australian naturalist and photographer Hilda Geissman as a young woman. Image: Thomas Mathewson Co.

Hilda Geissmann (22 November 1890 - 10 June 1988) was a pioneering Australian botanist, naturalist and photographer whose botanical and ornithological research within the Tamborine Mountain of South East Queensland significantly contributed to the early ecological understanding of the region.

== Early life ==
Hilda Geissmann was born in Brisbane in 1890 to Wilhelm Felix Geissmann and Bertha Elfriede Dorothea Geissmann. Her Swiss born father was a grocer by trade and in 1898, when Hilda was eight, he decided to move the family to Tamborine Mountain where he built a guest house called Capo di Monte (which later burnt down in 1930). She grew up with access to 200 acres of bushland and rainforest adjacent to her family home where, from a young age, she was to spend many hours gaining knowledge and experience of the natural world. She undertook art training at the Brisbane Central Technical College from 1913 alongside fellow students including painter Lloyd Rees and sculptor Daphne Mayo who was to remain a life-long friend. In 1926 she married Herbert Curtis, a widower in his 40s. In 1928 Geissmann was to give birth to her only child, Herbert Sydney (Syd) Curtis in 1928 who was to later become a notable ornithologist and conservation figure in Queensland.

== Natural History Work ==
Hilda Geissmann’s Natural History research, writing and photography was widely recognised within Australian botanical and ornithological communities in the early to mid-20th century. Her written articles (often accompanied by her photographs) were frequently published in the journal of the Queensland Naturalists Club (Queensland Naturalist) and her research was noted for being an important influence upon the work of Australian naturalist and author Alexander Hugh Chisholm as well as Zoologist and Conservationist Francis Ratcliffe who was to later become the chief of the CSIRO Division of Wildlife Research and founder of the Australian Conservation Foundation.

Geissmann’s work in the field of Orchid identification and collection was also important to the research of Australian botanists such as William Henry Nicholls, Alexander Greenlaw Hamilton, Herman Rupp, Richard Sanders Rogers, Anthony Musgrave (entomologist) and Ferdinand August Weinthal, all of whom she was known to frequently correspond on natural history matters whilst also fulfilling their requests for plant specimen photographs and fresh flower samples for study. Her scientific collaboration in this field with William Henry Nicholls was to later result in Nicholls naming the rainforest greenhood species Pterostylis hildae in her honour. Geissmann's work was also well recognised in the international scientific community and in 1925 Professor Charles Joseph Chamberlain of the University of Chicago sent her the microscope and chemicals necessary for conducting Histological work on Australian cycads, mosses and lichens which was critical to the University’s research in the field. Her photographic study of the 1000 year old Mt. Tambourine Cycad "Great Grandfather Peter" was to later also feature on the cover of the American Journal of Science Newsletter, in 1937 and many of Geissmann’s specimens reside in herbariums and museums in throughout the USA.
