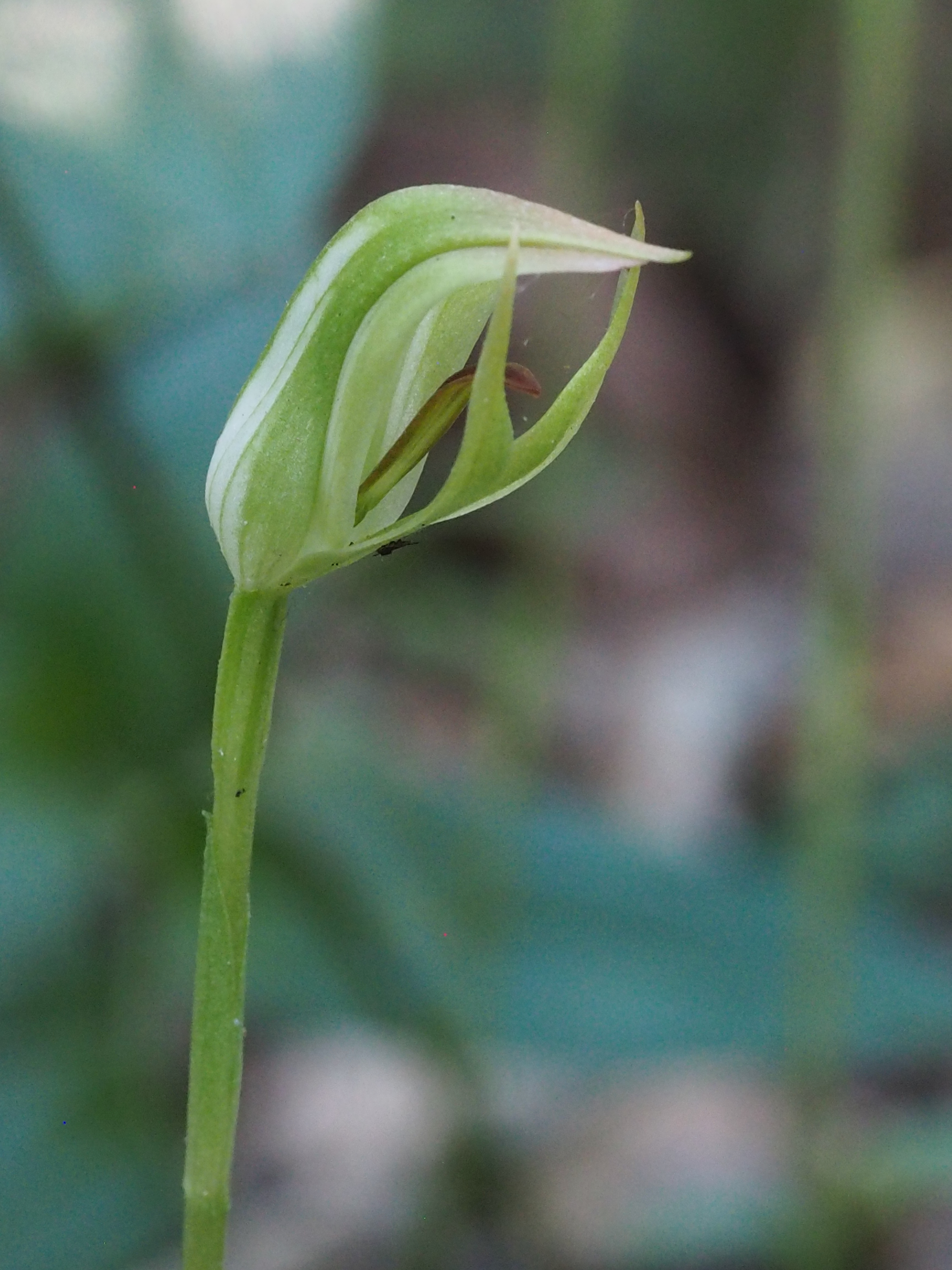
- In Bongil Bongil National Park

Scientific classification
- Kingdom: Plantae
- Clade: Embryophytes
- Clade: Tracheophytes
- Clade: Spermatophytes
- Clade: Angiosperms
- Clade: Monocots
- Order: Asparagales
- Family: Orchidaceae
- Subfamily: Orchidoideae
- Tribe: Cranichideae
- Genus: Pterostylis
- Species: P. hildae

Binomial name
- Pterostylis hildae Nicholls

= Pterostylis hildae =

Rainforest greenhood

Species of orchid

Pterostylis hildae, commonly known as rainforest greenhood, is a species of orchid found in eastern Australia. It has a rosette of leaves and when flowering a rosette at the base of a flowering stem with a single green, white and brown flower. It is found in wet forests, including rainforest in New South Wales and Queensland.

== Description ==
Pterostylis hildae is a terrestrial, perennial, deciduous, herb with an underground tuber and a rosette of between two and four elliptic leaves, each leaf 20–80 mm (0.8–3 in) long and 8–25 mm (0.3–1 in) wide. The leaves have a distinct petiole and sometimes a wavy edge. When flowering, there is a single green, white and brown flower 23–27 mm (0.9–1 in) long and 10–12 mm (0.4–0.5 in) wide which is borne on a flowering spike 80–200 mm (3–8 in) high. The dorsal sepal and petals are fused to form a hood or "galea" over the column and the petals and dorsal sepal have a short point on their tips which end at or near horizontal. There is a wide gap at each side of the flower between the petals and lateral sepals. The lateral sepals are erect with a tapering tip 10–12 mm (0.4–0.5 in) long no higher than the galea and there is a curved sinus with a deep notch between them. The labellum is 11–13 mm (0.4–0.5 in) long, about 4 mm (0.2 in) wide, curved and projects through the sinus. Flowering occurs from March to October.

== Taxonomy and naming ==
Pterostylis hildae was first described in 1937 by William Nicholls and the description was published in The Victorian Naturalist from a specimen collected on Tamborine Mountain. The specific epithet (hildae) honours Hilda Geissmann for her contributions to nature study in Queensland.

== Distribution and habitat ==
Rainforest greenhood is widespread and common in wet forest and rainforest between the Atherton Tableland in Queensland and Wollongong in New South Wales.
