= Anthony Musgrave (entomologist) =

Australian entomologist, librarian and photographer (1895–1959)

Anthony Musgrave (9 July 1895 – 4 June 1959) was an Australian entomologist. Born in Queensland, Australia, he is known for penning Bibliography of Australian Entomology (1932). He was the great-nephew of Anthony Musgrave who was Secretary of State for the Colonies.

== Early life ==
Anthony Musgrave was born 9 July 1895 in Cooktown, Queensland, Australia. His father was Anthony Musgrave, a civil servant, and his mother was Elizabeth Anne (née Colles). He studied at the Hayfield Preparatory School in Homebush and the Sydney Church of England Grammar School.

== Career ==
As an entomologist, Musgrave is known for his 1932 work, Bibliography of Australian Entomology. He worked at the Australian Museum, initially as a librarian for a year, before climbing up the ranks to become Assistant Entomologist, and eventually the museum's entomologist, a title later changed to "Curator of Insects and Arachnids". He displayed much knowledge on insects and arachnids; his area of expertise were ticks and venomous spiders. Musgrave was compiler of all of the Australian Science Abstracts' animal-related articles for around twenty years, until in 1957 when the publication folded. He was also a contributor to the Australian Encyclopaedia (editions 1 and 2).

== Personal life and death ==
Musgrave was described as an "excellent lecturer and photographer". He led a luxurious and peaceful life and was an avid golfer. In his later years, little was heard about him; Musgrave did not like publicity. He died at the Royal North Shore Hospital in Sydney on 4 June 1959. The cause of death was listed as heart disease.

== See also ==
- List of entomologists
