= Norman Park State School =

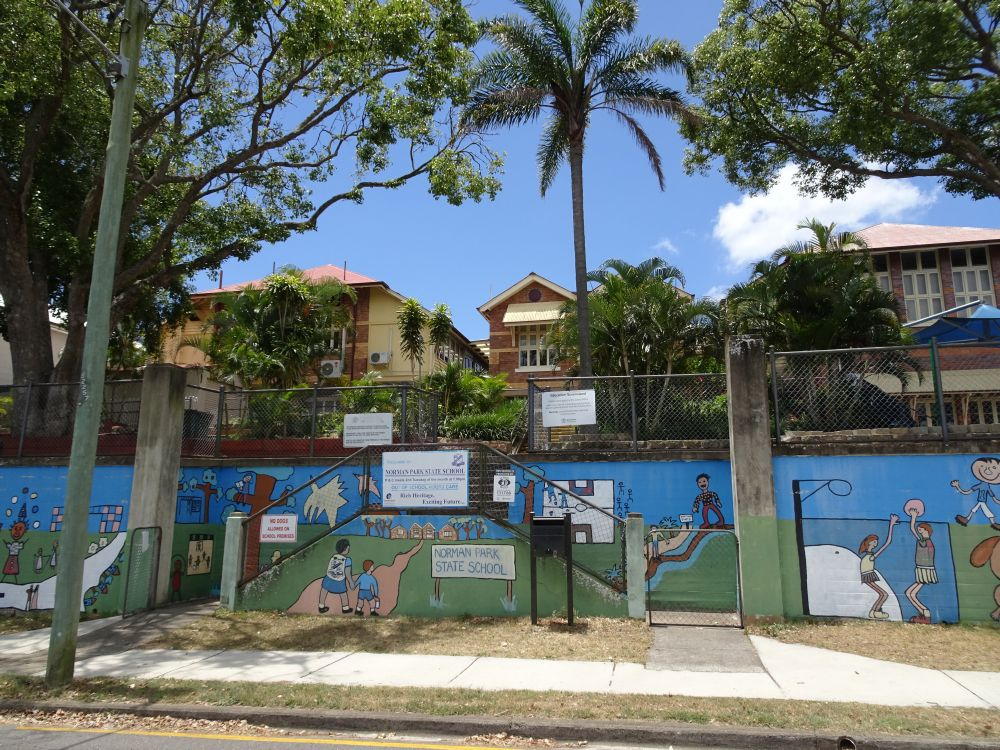
- Agnew St retaining walls and entrance stairs, 2016

- Location within Queensland
- 27.4744°S 153.0628°E
- Location: 68–88 Agnew Street, Norman Park, City of Brisbane, Queensland, Australia

History
- Design period: 1900–1914 (Early 20th century)
- Built: 1900: urban brick school buildings, 1915: Open–air Annexe (enclosed 1922), 1934: Depression-era brick additions

Site notes
- Architect: Department of Public Works (Queensland)

Queensland Heritage Register
- Official name: Norman Park State School
- Type: state heritage
- Designated: 7 April 2017
- Reference no.: 650042
- Type: Education, Research, Scientific Facility: School – state (primary)
- Theme: Educating Queenslanders: Providing primary schooling

Norman Park State School is a heritage-listed state school at 68–88 Agnew Street, Norman Park, City of Brisbane, Queensland, Australia. It was designed by Department of Public Works (Queensland) and built in 1900. It was added to the Queensland Heritage Register on 7 April 2017.

== History ==
Norman Park State School (SS) opened on its present site in 1900 due to population growth in and near the Brisbane suburb of Norman Park. The school is important in demonstrating the evolution of state education and its associated architecture. In 2017 Norman Park SS retains its core complex of five buildings: Blocks A and C (urban brick school building, 1900); Block D (open-air annexe, 1915); and Blocks B and E (Depression-era brick additions, 1934). The school grounds also retain brick and concrete retaining walls, stairs and fences (1930s, 1950s); a playing field and mature trees. The school has been in continuous operation since its establishment.

The suburb of Norman Park lies adjacent to the Brisbane River and east of Norman Creek, which was first bridged in the late 1850s. Part of the traditional lands of the Jagera and Turrbal peoples, the area was settled for farming from the 1850s, and in the 1870s it was a popular picnic spot. In 1886 the Queensland Deposit Bank and Building Society Limited purchased the land on which Norman Park SS was later built, and subdivided it as part the Norman Park Estate. Although estate subdivisions were sold off from March 1887, the suburb remained sparsely populated until the interwar period, when stormwater drainage of low-lying flood prone areas was commenced. By 1935 about 35% of land blocks were occupied.

Development of the Norman Park Estate was assisted by improvements in transport. The Cleveland railway line, opened in 1889, passed through the suburb; while the Belmont tramway, opened in 1912, branched off the Cleveland line north of the Norman Park railway station. In 1903 a replacement bridge over Norman Creek allowed a new tramline to run along Wynnum Road (then called New Cleveland Road) to a terminus east of Norman Creek. This tramline was extended towards Morningside in 1924.

Although development of Norman Park was slow initially, there was sufficient population in the area by the late 1890s to lead to pressure for a school. At that time the nearest state schools were at Kangaroo Point State School and Bulimba State School, a considerable distance away. The establishment of schools was considered an essential step in the development of new communities and integral to their success. Schools became a community focus, with the school community contributing to maintenance and development; a symbol of progress; and a source of pride, with enduring connections formed with past pupils, parents, and teachers.

A Norman Park school building committee was formed at a public meeting on 11 June 1897, and an application for a state school was made on 2 September 1897. The site proposed for the new school was on "a dry ridge" between Hipwood and Agnew streets. On 9 December 1898, the Secretary for Public Instruction approved establishment of the school, so long as the site could be purchased at a reasonable price. The initial school reserve (R.872) consisted of 22 subdivisions, totalling 2 acres (0.81 ha) and 32.4 perches (820 m^{2}). The land was purchased by the Secretary for Public Instruction in early 1899 for a discounted price (£660 instead of £940), which the estate owners accepted due to the likely improvement in value of the surrounding land that a new school would bring.

Instead of a standard timber school, Norman Park's school building committee requested a brick school, on the same terms as East Brisbane State School; which involved a one-sixth contribution by the community to the building cost. In April 1899 the Works Department presented estimates for the school in either brick or timber, and the building committee again chose brick. Tenders were called, and in November 1899 the tender of Charles Miller, for £2023 and 14s was accepted, with the school, a teacher's residence, fencing and gates to be completed in five months.

The urban brick school building constructed at Norman Park was individually designed by the Department of Public Works. Brick school buildings were far less frequently built than timber ones, being only provided in prosperous urban or suburban areas with stable or rapidly-increasing populations. All brick school buildings were individually designed with variations in style, size, and form, but generally retained similar classroom sizes, layouts and window arrangements to timber schools to facilitate natural light and ventilation. However, compared to contemporary standard education buildings, these buildings had a grander character and greater landmark attributes.

As shown on an April 1899 plan, the urban brick school building comprised two blocks (Blocks A and C in 2017) linked at right angles, with a third, unbuilt block intended to complete a U-shaped arrangement in future. Each block contained a single large classroom, 40 by 24 feet (12.2 by 7.3 m), with 10-foot (3.0 m) wide verandahs on each side. A hat/cloak room and teachers room, both measuring 20 feet (6.1 m) by 13 feet 6 inches (4.11 m), projected towards Agnew Street off the southeast block's verandah, with entrance stairs on either side. The open understory had space for play areas, tanks and lavatories. The completed school could accommodate 305 pupils, with 120 in each classroom; 50 on the L-shaped verandah, and 15 in the teachers room.

Externally, the red, face brick walls were relieved by light brick banding and dark brick arches and lintels. Verandahs and landings were of timber and protected by lattice screens. Windows were generally pivot-hung sash windows, with those to the teachers room and hat room sheltered by hoods with decorative timber struts. The gabled and hipped roofs were sheeted with corrugated iron and had ventilation fleches. According to the Public Works Annual Report of 1901 the school was constructed on similar lines to New Farm and East Brisbane state schools.

A school residence was located in the centre of the school grounds, facing Hipwood Street, backing onto two unpurchased subdivisions facing Agnew Street. This meant that the school grounds were effectively cut in half. Boys and girls toilets were located alongside the northwest boundary of the school, behind the classrooms.

The completed school was opened on 7 July 1900 by the Secretary for Public Instruction, James Drake. It was reported that the school was "grandly situated on the summit of a hill, and though its immediate surroundings are in the bush, it commands a populous and growing neighbourhood". The total cost was £2723 16s, with local residents to pay £493 1s 11d. The initial enrolment of 52 students grew to 174 by September 1900.

In May 1908 a tree planting day was held at the school to celebrate Arbor Day, during which John Douglas Story (Under Secretary for Public Instruction) expressed his pleasure that an attempt was being made to beautify the "naturally magnificent" school site. An important component of Queensland state schools was their grounds. The early and continuing commitment to play-based education, particularly in primary school, resulted in the provision of outdoor play space and sporting facilities, such as ovals and tennis courts. Also, trees and gardens were planted to shade and beautify schools, and Arbor Day celebrations began in Queensland in 1890. Educators believed gardening and Arbor Days instilled in young minds the value of hard work and activity, improved classroom discipline and developed aesthetic tastes.

In 1914 the school finally obtained the two subdivisions in the middle of the school reserve. Enrolments had reached 330, with settlement in the district growing rapidly.

To accommodate a class for infants, an open-air annexe (Block D in 2017) was added to the school in 1915, connected to the northeast verandah of Block A. Open-air annexes were introduced as a standard design in 1914 in response to contemporary medical theories related to the need for high levels of natural ventilation and light for health. The open-air annexe type was developed in metropolitan areas and built as an addition to existing school complexes to relieve overcrowded classrooms. It comprised a timber building with one solid wall (the western verandah wall) and three open sides enclosed only by adjustable canvas blinds. Ideally, they were highset, to increase ventilation and provide shelter underneath. By the 1920s open-air annexes had proved to be inadequate as the open sides provided limited weather protection and climate control, and the canvas blinds deteriorated quickly. As a final refinement of the design, canvas blinds were replaced by sliding sash windows in new and existing open-air schools and annexes throughout Queensland. Use of the open-air annexe type was discontinued from 1923.

The open-air annexe at Norman Park was constructed by FJ Corbett for a contract price of £739. It was a standard design with three open sides, and it was positioned at the northeast corner of the urban brick school building where there was sufficient space for the length of the building and the northwest-facing verandah could accommodate a semi-detached teachers room. The single classroom measured 51 by 25 feet (15.5 by 7.6 m), with seating for 70 students, and had a coved ceiling sheeted with pressed metal. The verandah was 10 feet (3.0 m) wide, with a semi-enclosed hat room at the northern end. The teachers room measured 15 by 12 feet (4.6 by 3.7 m), with stairs on either side. The building stood on brick piers, with a concreted play space underneath.

Block D was opened on Saturday 16 October 1915 by the Minister for Public Instruction, Herbert Hardacre. As with other open-air annexes, the blinds were replaced with sliding sash windows and boarding c. 1922, due to complaints from teachers and parents about children being exposed to bad weather and unable to see their work when the blinds were closed.

In the 1920s there was concern about a lack of level parade ground space behind the urban brick school building. In 1929, 32 perches (810 m^{2}) of additional land was acquired at the northwest corner of the school reserve, allowing the toilets to be relocated there. A basketball court had been built at the corner of Hipwood and School streets by June 1923. By 1925 there was an average of nearly 600 children attending the school, as the extension of tram lines through Norman Park had "caused a large number of people to build in the vicinity of the school".

Major ground improvements and extra accommodation were provided at Norman Park SS during the 1930s, due to the pressure of overcrowding (630 enrolled in 1932) and an increase in government spending. The Great Depression, commencing in 1929 and extending well into the 1930s, caused a dramatic reduction of public building work in Queensland and brought private building work to a standstill. Even before the October 1929 stock market crash, the Queensland Government initiated an Unemployment Relief Scheme, through a work program administered by the Department of Public Works. This included painting and repairs to school buildings and grounds improvement works. Extensive funding was given for improvements, including fencing and levelling ground for play areas, involving terracing and retaining walls. In June 1932 the Forgan Smith Labor Government came to power and embarked on a large public building program that included new buildings or additions at schools.

Depression-era work at Norman Park SS included the construction of new toilets in 1932, located beneath Block C (girls and female teachers), Block A (infant girls and boys and male teachers) and Block D (boys). The toilets were enclosed externally by infill walls and high-level louvre windows, and timber partitions internally. A tall, concrete septic tank was constructed in the western corner of the grounds and was operational by 1 January 1933. However, the tank was decommissioned after sewerage lines were connected to the school c. 1937.

Two new brick blocks (Blocks B and E in 2017), sympathetic in design to the 1900 urban brick school building, were also added to the school and opened on 28 July 1934. Block B was connected to the southeast end of Block A and featured decorative details to match Block C. It contained two classrooms on the first floor and one double classroom on the ground floor. The first floor had verandahs on the northwest and southeast sides, and a stairwell at the northeast corner led down to a ground floor verandah on the southeast side. Block E, which was highset with understorey play space, was connected to the northwest corner of Block A. It had three classrooms separated by folding partitions, and a southeast-facing verandah with a semi-enclosed hat room at the north end. Both blocks had hipped roofs of corrugated iron; Block B had a roof fleche and Block E had a dormer window over its central classroom.

Further classrooms were created by dividing the original classrooms in Blocks A and C with new central passageways linking the verandahs. Windows were also modified to comply with the new ideal of providing natural lighting for students on their left hand side. Windows to the verandahs of Blocks A and C were bricked up and additional windows inserted in the end elevations of both blocks. The school now consisted of five connected blocks - four brick and one timber – containing 11 classrooms.

Works to the upper school grounds during the Depression-era improved circulation and stabilised the steep site. Brick retaining walls and concrete steps were built to the north and south of Block B c. 1933–34. The school residence was removed at this time.

In late-1935 a high retaining wall was built along Agnew Street, with a T-shaped set of entrance stairs aligned with the front of Block A. In addition, a high retaining wall between the upper (northwest) and lower (southeast) sections of the school grounds was added at this time, with stairs at the Agnew Street and Hipwood Street ends. Low, stepped concrete walls were also added along Agnew Street, southeast of the high retaining wall, and along Hipwood Street. All 1935 retaining walls were of cast in-situ concrete and topped with chain wire fences. Between the Agnew Street retaining wall and the school buildings, a sloping bank was added, topped with a surface drain and a two-rail steel fence and ascended by centrally placed stairs.

Most non-military building work in Queensland ceased during World War II (WWII), but air raid shelters (slit trenches) were dug at Norman Park SS in 1942 on the lower playground. At this time there was also a tennis court on the lower playground, on the Agnew Street frontage adjacent to the retaining wall.

The lower grounds remained roughly landscaped, with eroded banks and collapsing timber fences, until at least 1949–50. At this time it was proposed to grade the slopes to the streets and fence the playground. A battered (sloped) wall of stones set in concrete was constructed below the southeast and northeast elevations of Block D; and by 1957 the concrete wall along Hipwood Street had been extended to the northwest, past a vehicle entrance, to incorporate a pedestrian entrance and steps.

Changes to the school buildings in the 1950s improved natural lighting and increased classroom numbers and storage space. The former cloakroom and head teachers room on the southwest side of Block A became staffrooms in 1953, at which time casement windows were inserted below the original pivot windows to improve natural lighting. A storeroom was enclosed at the south end of the first floor southeast verandah of Block B that year. In 1954 the northwest verandah of Block C was enclosed with sliding sash windows to create a library; the ground floor classroom of Block B was partitioned to form two rooms; and Block D's classroom was partitioned with folding doors. A two-level addition, with a classroom at each level, was made to the northeast end of Block D in c. 1957; and two highset classrooms (Block F in 2017) were added to the west of Block E in c. 1958.

Additions and changes to the school were also made from the 1960s to the 1980s. A swimming pool was built in the northwest corner of the school and officially opened 31 October 1964. A retaining wall was built nearby in c. 1969. By May 1969 enrolments had dropped to 315 pupils due to the transfer of Grade 8 to high school (1964), and the opening of Seven Hills State School in 1960.

By 1975 further verandah enclosures had taken place at the south end of Block C's southeast verandah and the south end of Block B's northwest verandah. In 1977 the southwest classroom of Block C was modified to accommodate a speech therapy resources room. In 1979 the toilets under Block D were extended to the northeast, resulting in the 1930s toilets beneath blocks A and C being converted into store rooms. In 1980 Block B's first floor southeast verandah was enclosed, and by 1989 an external walkway existed along the northwest side of Block A.

Changes after 1990 included the painting of a mural on the Agnew Street retaining wall in 1997, and a major refurbishment of Block D's interior in 1998, including the enclosure of the verandah and new large openings in the classroom walls. A new building (Block G in 2017) was added to the lower playground in 2004–05, on the site of the tennis courts, and the hall northeast of Block G was constructed between 2009 and 2011.

The school celebrated its centenary in 2000, with the publication of a school history, and the creation of a Centenary Garden. In 2017, the school retains its early complex of five classroom blocks and its Depression-era retaining walls, fences and steps, set within landscaped grounds with mature shade trees. The school is important to the area as a focus for the community where generations of students have been taught.

== Description ==
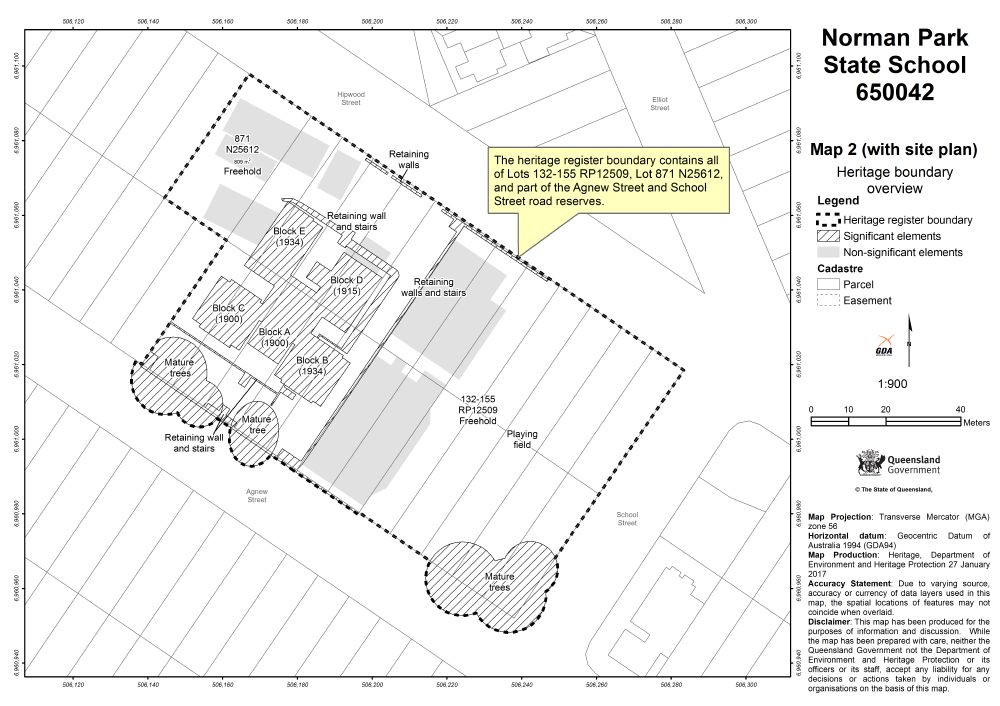
Site map, 2017

Norman Park State School occupies a 1.05-hectare (2.6-acre) site in the Brisbane suburb of Norman Park, approximately 4 kilometres (2.5 mi) east of the CBD. Located within a suburban residential area, the school is bounded by Agnew Street to the southwest, School Street to the southeast, Hipwood Street to the northeast and residential properties to the northwest. At the core of the school is the original complex of four brick classroom blocks and one timber classroom block, constructed between 1900 and 1934. The core occupies a high point in the terrain with extensive views to the west and south. The school grounds step down via a series of retaining walls towards the bounding streets, and a playing field occupies the southeast end of the site (the lower playground). The main entrance to the grounds is via a formal pedestrian stairway on Agnew Street, with secondary entrances around the school perimeter and vehicular access provided from Hipwood Street. The school grounds are well established and contain a number of significant mature trees and landscaping features such as Depression-era retaining walls, a playing field and a school bell.

The five significant classroom blocks are positioned close together and linked at their corners by verandahs and walkways. These blocks are:

- Block A (central block), urban brick school building (1900)
- Block C (southwest block), urban brick school building (1900)
- Block D (northeast block), open-air annexe (1915)
- Block B (southeast block), Depression-era brick addition (1934)
- Block E (northwest block), Depression-era brick addition (1934)

Blocks B and E, constructed in the 1930s, were designed to complement the school's original urban brick school building, of which only blocks A and C were completed in 1900. Block D is a former open-air annexe with semi-detached teachers room, and the only timber building of the five. All blocks are two storeys, with hipped roofs clad in corrugated metal sheeting. With the exception of Block B, which has two levels of classrooms, all blocks have open play space on the ground floor.

=== Block A: urban brick school building (1900) ===
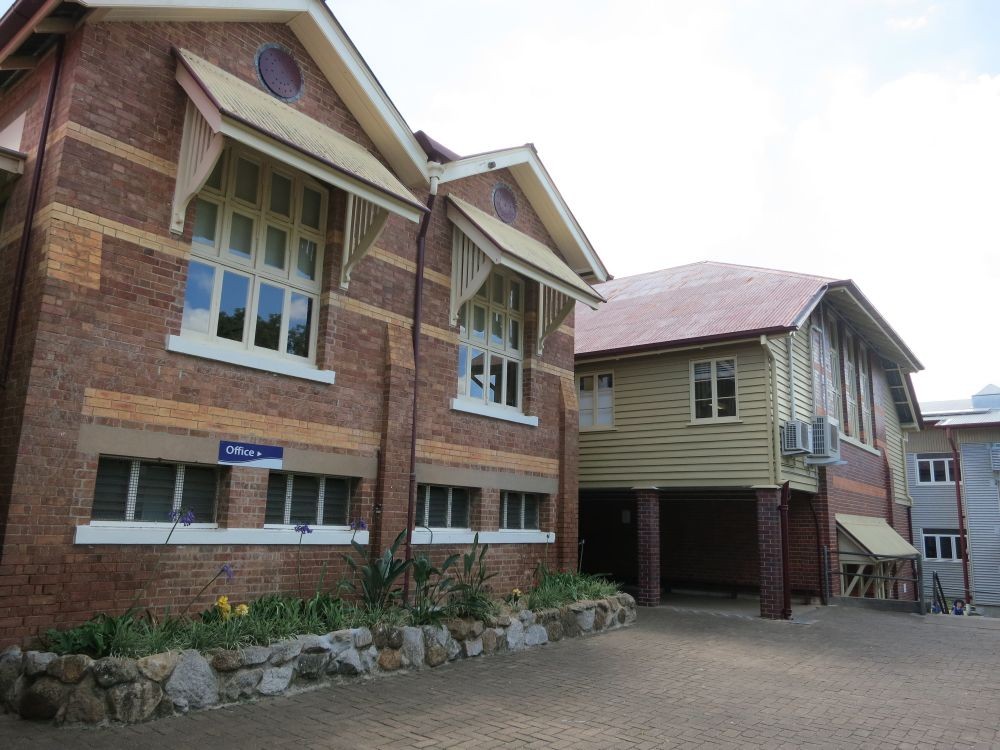
Southwest sides of blocks A (left) and B (right), 2016

Block A comprises two classrooms, a northeast verandah, and two offices (formerly a hat room and teachers room), separated from the classrooms by verandah passageway. Access to the first floor is by two sets of timber stairs, located on either side of the offices.

The walls are constructed from orange-red brick with buff brick banding and dark glazed bricks to arched lintels over original door and window openings and throughout the understorey. Some external walls, including the main facade, are strengthened by buttresses with bevelled tops of buff brick. The verandahs and floor and roof framing are constructed from timber. Windows have either stone or concrete sills, and windows inserted or modified from the 1930s onwards have horizontal concrete lintels.

The main (southwest) facade is characterised by the double gable front of the two offices, which feature circular vents at the gable apexes. An early rainwater head survives at the gable valley, and the attached downpipe is positioned to match early photographs. Two large banks of windows on the first floor are sheltered by skillion window hoods with timber battened cheeks. Both the gable eaves and underside of window hoods are lined with V-jointed (VJ) tongue and groove (T&G) boards.

The building has a combination of original and later timber-framed joinery. The windows to the first floor of the main facade comprise two rows of four original windows - the outer ones fixed and the central ones horizontally centre pivoting. A third row along the bottom (inserted in 1953) are casements and taller in proportion. A similar arrangement of sashes exists in a smaller window in the southeast wall. Windows in the side walls of the classrooms comprise two fanlights (top), three horizontally centre-pivoting windows (centre) and three casements (bottom), most with original hardware. Sashes are a combination of original fabric and later additions. Former windows in the southwest and northeast walls of the classrooms have been enclosed with brickwork, but retain their arched brick lintels and stone sills. Doors to the classrooms retain their two horizontally-pivoting fanlights.

The understorey has brick arches beneath structural walls and square brick piers supporting the timber classroom floors and northeast verandah. The corners of all piers and arch are rounded. The ground is laid with bitumen. Beneath the offices are two store rooms, accessed by c. 1930s battened doors. These rooms retain traces of their former use as toilets, such as the concrete floor slab, timber partitions in the northwest room, and highset louvred windows in the external walls.

The northeast verandah has a raked ceiling lined with VJ, T&G boards; square timber verandah posts; and a spandrel lined with vertical boards at the northwest end.

While the timber access stairs are largely modern replacements, they both retain an original timber archway with vertical batten screen above at the upper landing. The passageway running between the classrooms and offices has face brick walls and a flat ceiling lined with VJ, T&G boards.

The classrooms have coved ceilings lined with VJ, T&G boards and evidence of two centrally located circular vents (now enclosed). The masonry walls are rendered, with lines scored into the render to resemble wide skirtings. Sections of two single-skin timber partitions divide the two rooms, and contain early joinery: two three-light double-hung windows with two-light fanlights; and a two light fanlight over the door to the northwest classroom. Both rooms have timber picture rails, and the partitions have lambs tongue-profile skirtings. The offices have plaster-lined walls and flat ceilings lined with VJ, T&G boards.

Non-significant elements of Block A include: walkways along the northwest and southeast sides of the building; infill roofs over the access stairs and walkways; bag racks to the northeast verandah; air-conditioning units, ceiling fans, lights and other services; modern floor linings of carpet and linoleum; modern doors and replacement fanlights; and modern partitions and cabinetry.

=== Block C: urban brick school building (1900) ===
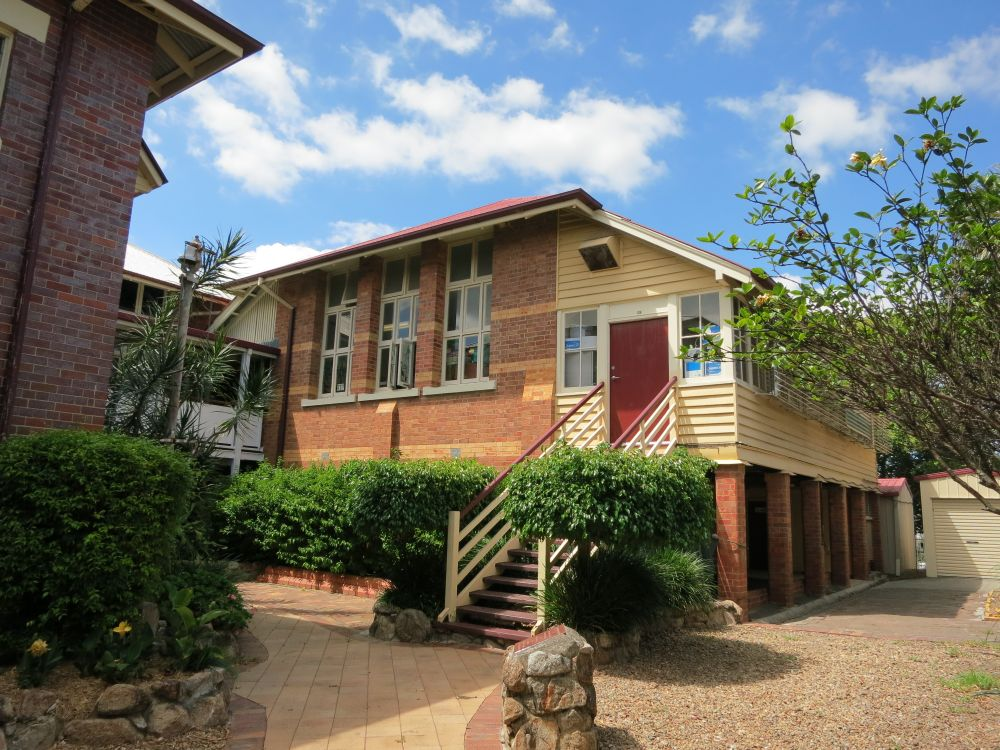
Northeast side of Block C, 2016

Block C has the same construction method and aesthetic treatment as Block A. It comprises two former classrooms with verandahs on the southeast and northwest sides. Access is via the southeast verandah, which links to the northwest end of Block A, and a set of external stairs to the northeast corner.

The northeast and southwest elevations are of face brick, with buttress supports and large windows to the classrooms on the first floor. The eaves are unlined, and the exposed rafters are notched at the ends.

Like Block A, the large windows are a combination of timber-framed casements, vertically centre-pivoting and top hung fanlight sashes, dating from different periods and most with original hardware. Former windows in the southeast and northwest walls have been enclosed with brickwork, but retain their arched brick lintels and stone sills. Doors in the southeast and northwest walls retain their two horizontally-pivoting fanlights and low waisted double doors, one of which has original hardware.

The understorey has a bitumen ground surface and the same arrangement of brick arches and piers as beneath Block A. The southwest end is partially enclosed for staff toilets (western corner, beneath the verandah) and a store room (beneath the classroom). The store room retains traces of its former use as toilets, including the concrete floor slab, timber enclosing partitions, and highset louvred windows in walls inserted between the external arches. The store room is accessed by a timber batten gate and a pair of relocated, early panelled timber doors. The staff toilets are accessed by a braced and ledged timber board door. The layout of the toilets matches 1930s plans, however the fitout has been modernised.

Both verandahs have square timber verandah posts and raked ceilings lined with VJ, T&G boards. The southeast verandah retains sections of three-rail balustrade with dowel balusters. The southern end of this verandah is enclosed. The northwest verandah is enclosed with weatherboards and timber-framed, four-light sliding sash windows. The enclosing walls are lined on the interior with VJ, T&G boards.

The former classrooms (used as staff and resource rooms in 2016) have coved ceilings lined with VJ, T&G boards and the northeast room retains a circular ceiling vent with fretwork panel. The masonry walls are rendered, with lines scored into the render to resemble wide skirtings. Sections of two single-skin timber partitions divide the two rooms, and contain an early doorway with a two-light fanlight. The northeast room has timber picture rails and lambs tongue-profile skirting to the partition. The southwest room has undergone alterations, including relining of the timber partition, the installation of a suspended ceiling, and the creation of a doorway in the northwest masonry wall. The uppermost level of windows is concealed by the suspended ceiling.

Non-significant elements of Block C include: the suspended ceiling and modern wall linings to the staff room (former southwest classroom); air-conditioning units, ceiling fans, lights and other services; modern floor linings of carpet and linoleum; and modern doors, partitions and cabinetry.

=== Block D: open-air annexe (1915) ===
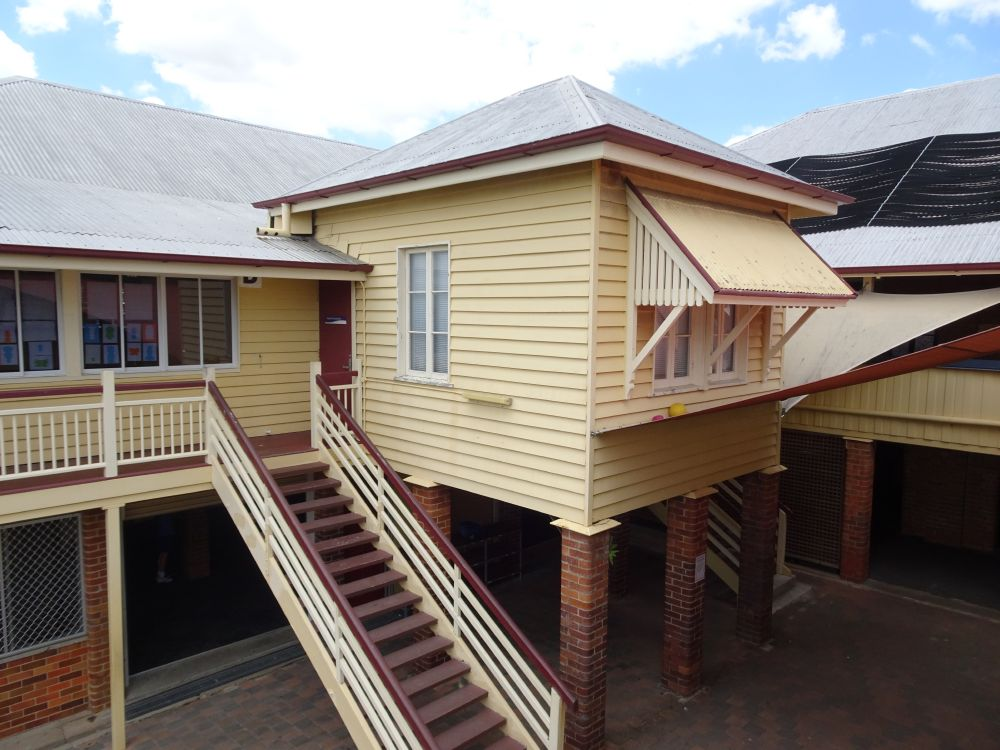
Block D Teachers Room, 2016

Block D is timber-framed, clad in timber weatherboards and stands on square brick piers. It comprises two large classrooms with an enclosed verandah along the northwest side, and a semi-detached teachers room with a hipped roof. Access is via the verandah, which links to the northeast corner of Block A, and two sets of timber stairs on the northwest side. A two-storey classroom extension to the northeast end of the block (constructed 1957) is not of heritage significance.

The block's original use as an open-air annexe is evident in the external cladding, with the vertical timber posts of the wall structure visible between weatherboard panels. Windows in the southwest wall are 1920s timber-framed, six-light sliding sash windows with long, four-light fanlights above. Windows in the southeast wall have been replaced with c. 1950s timber-framed awning windows. The teachers room has sets of paired, three-light casement windows, with those on the northwest side sheltered by a timber-framed skillion hood with angled brackets and battened sides. Eaves along the southeast and southwest classroom walls and to the teachers room are unlined.

The southwest side of the understorey is enclosed for girls, boys and staff toilets. Walls within the understory are timber partitions of vertical VJ boards with lattice screens above. Wall and toilet partitions at the southwest end date from the 1930s, while those at the northeast end are 1979 additions in a similar style. Exterior infill walls between piers are of concrete block with high-level louvre windows. The play space has been modified, with modern carpet lining the floor and roller doors installed between the perimeter piers so the space can be enclosed.

The verandah is fully enclosed with weatherboard cladding and modern glazing, apart from a small landing at the top of the southwest staircase, where a small section of three-rail balustrade with dowel balusters survives. It retains its raked ceiling with VJ, T&G board linings. The wall between the verandah and classrooms has been largely demolished and/or reconstructed to create large openings.

The classrooms retain vertical VJ, T&G board linings to the perimeter walls and sections of the former verandah wall. The central partition contains wide, folding timber doors (c. 1950s). The original ceiling is concealed behind a modern suspended ceiling.

The teachers room has a pressed metal ceiling with square ceiling vent, and walls lined with vertical VJ, T&G boards. The location of the original door is evident in the lining of the southeast wall.

Non-significant elements of Block D include: a modern verandah addition to the north side of the teachers room; sun-shading screens to the southeast side; modern partitions, roller doors and floor coverings to the understorey; suspended ceilings to the classrooms; air-conditioning units, ceiling fans, lights and other services; modern floor linings of carpet and linoleum; and modern doors, glazing, partitions and cabinetry.

=== Block B: Depression-era brick addition (1934) ===
Block B was designed to match Block C in its size, layout, materials and aesthetic treatment. It comprises two classrooms on the first floor, with verandahs (now enclosed) on the northwest and southeast sides, and a large classroom on the ground floor with a ground floor verandah on the southeast side. The ground floor level is lower than the understory level of the other blocks, with brick retaining walls and stairs at the northern and southern ends of the block separating the southeast corner of the upper playground from the understorey level. Access to the first floor is via the northwest verandah, which links to the southeast end of Block A, and a stairwell in the northeast corner of the southeast verandahs.

The building is constructed from glazed, dark red bricks, with orange brick banding and details to the southwest and northeast elevations. The verandahs are timber framed and clad in timber weatherboards. Like Block C, the end walls have shallow buttresses and the unlined eaves feature exposed rafters with notched ends. Windows in masonry walls have concrete sills and doors have horizontal concrete lintels. Windows to the enclosing verandah walls are either timber-framed, three-light casements or modern aluminium sliding windows.

Windows to the first floor classrooms are timber-framed and of similar proportions to Block C, with a combination of timber-framed casements, vertically centre-pivoting and top hung fanlight sashes, with original hardware. Ground floor classroom windows are three-light casements with square fanlights above, sheltered by timber-framed, skillion hoods with angled brackets.

A walkway beneath the northwest verandah links with the adjoining understorey areas and has a concrete floor and square brick piers with rounded edges supporting the verandah floor above.

The ground floor verandah is partially enclosed with brick walls at each end, to create a hat room (now storage area) at the southwest end and enclose the timber-framed staircase at the northeast end. Timber posts with stop-chamfered edges support a weatherboard-clad panel spanning between the two walls. The verandah has a concrete floor, face brick walls, and a flat ceiling lined with VJ, T&G boards. Coat hooks attached to horizontal timber rails remain attached to walls throughout the space. Doors to the classroom are modern replacements; however, the southern doorway is an original opening with fanlight. The staircase has a timber batten balustrade and timber newel posts with angular-shaped tops.

The ground floor classroom has plaster-lined walls with timber picture rails. The ceiling is spanned by two bulkheads and is lined with flat sheeting with cover strips arranged in a square pattern.

Both first floor verandahs have raked ceilings lined with VJ, T&G boards, and face brick walls to the classrooms. The southeast verandah has an original store room at the northern end, accessed by a timber board door, and a 1950s storeroom in an original hat room enclosure at the southern end, accessed by a high-waisted panelled timber door. Doorways in the centre of each verandah wall retain their timber-framed fanlights, and the southeast door retains its double timber doors with original hardware. Large openings have been created in the northwest classroom walls, supported by steel beam lintels.

Dividing the classrooms are two timber-framed, single-skin partitions clad in vertical VJ, T&G boards. Large openings have been created in both partitions, however they retain original door and window openings with fanlights above, and one panelled timber door survives in the southwest classroom. Remaining classroom walls are rendered, with timber picture rails. Ceilings are lined with flat sheeting with covered strips arranged in a square pattern, and retain lattice ceiling vent panels in the centre.

Non-significant elements of Block B include: metal gates to the ground floor verandah; air-conditioning units, ceiling fans, lights and other services; modern floor linings of carpet and linoleum; and modern doors, glazing, partitions and cabinetry.

=== Block E: Depression-era brick addition (1934) ===
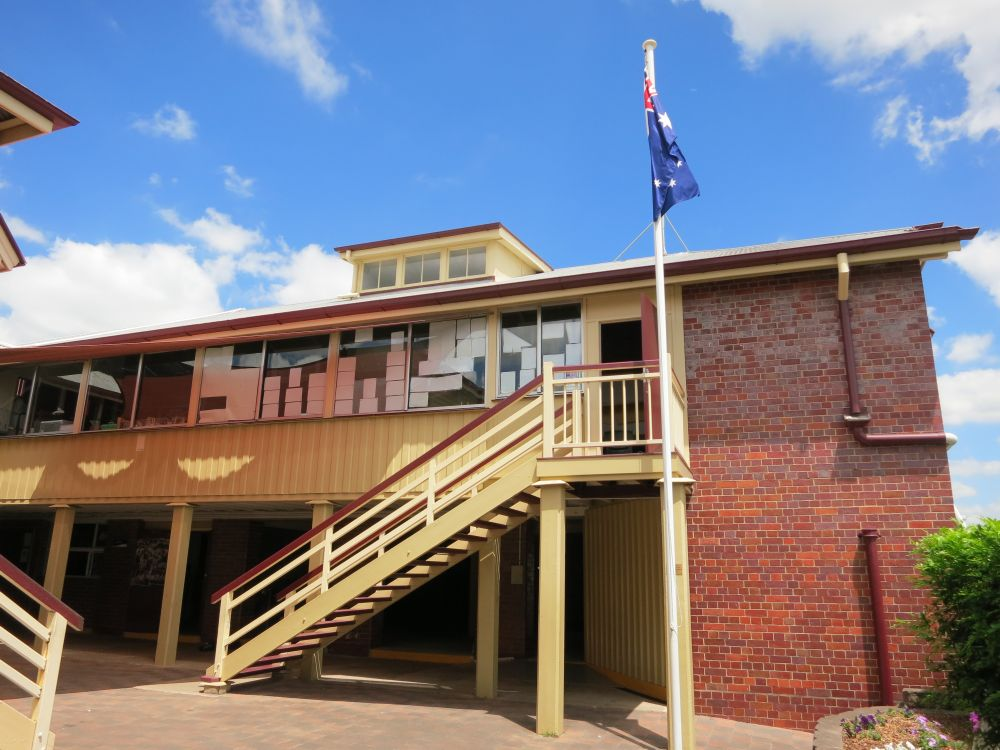
Southeast side of Block E, 2016

Block E comprises two large classrooms on the first floor (formerly three), a southeast-facing verandah (now enclosed), and an open understory with later classroom enclosure at the southwest end. Access is via the verandah, which links to the northwest corner of Block A, a set of timber stairs at the northeast end of the verandah, and via Block F, which adjoins Block E on the northwest side.

Constructed from the same dark red glazed bricks as Block B, Block E is plainer in style, without buttresses or brick banding details. The verandah is timber-framed and supported on square concrete piers. Windows in masonry walls have concrete sills, and doorways and later inserted windows and doors have horizontal concrete lintels. The northern end of the verandah is partially enclosed with brick on both levels. A southeast-facing dormer window with three window bays is located over the centre of the building.

Classrooms windows in the northeast and southwest walls are three-light casements with two-light fanlights above, sheltered by timber-framed, skillion hoods with angled brackets. Non-significant windows inserted in the northwest wall in c. 1958 include high-level louvres and large, double-hung sashes with rectangular fanlights.

The understorey has a concrete floor, rendered ceiling, wide brick piers or solid walls below the classroom walls, and square concrete piers down the centre. Brick piers, buttresses and openings have rounded corners, and sections of early timber seating survive along the northwest wall. The southwest end of the space has been enclosed with modern brick infill, partitions and glazing to create a music room; and a store room has been created beneath the northeast end of the verandah.

The verandah has a raked ceiling lined with VJ, T&G boards and face brick walls. A former hat room at the northeast end has been enclosed to form a store room. Three original doorways retain their fanlights, however a bank of windows has been removed to create a large opening.

The classrooms have rendered walls with timber picture rails and lambs tongue-profile skirtings, and ceilings lined with flat sheeting with cover strips arranged in a square pattern. Lattice ceiling vent panels have been removed and infilled. Bulkheads indicate the location of former folding partitions between classrooms.

Non-significant elements of Block E include: modern partitions, infill walls and metal gates to the understorey; bag racks and aluminium windows enclosing the verandah; air-conditioning units, ceiling fans, lights and other services; modern floor linings of carpet and linoleum; and modern doors, glazing, partitions and cabinetry.

=== Other buildings ===
A classroom block (Block F) and a swimming pool lie to the northwest of the core complex, and a large, multi-level classroom building (Block G) and a Hall and amenities block lie to the southeast, adjacent to the playing field. None of these buildings or their connecting walkways are of heritage significance.

=== Retaining walls and stairs ===
A series of retaining walls and stairs separate the various levels of the school grounds. Along the Agnew Street boundary are c. 1935 cast in-situ concrete walls incorporating T-shaped formal entrance stairs near the centre and a staircase with Art Deco-style concrete archway near the southeast end, leading down to the playing field. The walls are topped by chainwire fencing and adjacent concrete spoon drains provide drainage. At the northwest end, the wall adjoins a rectangular concrete structure, formerly used as a septic tank.

Running perpendicular to the base of the playing field stairs is a c. 1935 high, cast in-situ concrete wall that spans the width of the school grounds, separating the upper and lower playground levels. Concrete spoon drains run along the top and base of the wall, which is topped by chainwire fencing. At the northern end the wall meets a second set of concrete stairs and a stepped concrete retaining wall along the Hipwood Street boundary.

Around the core complex are walls and stairs constructed at different periods. Running parallel to Agnew Street in front of blocks C and A is a low wall and spoon drain at the top of a sloping bank, constructed c. 1935. Concrete stairs ascend this bank in line with the Agnew Street entrance stairs and the centre of Block A's main facade. Perpendicular to the bank at the southeast end is an earlier brick retaining wall and stairs adjoining the southwest end of Block B. Matching brick retaining walls extend in an L-shape from the northeast end of Block B, ending in set of stairs. From these stairs, a c. 1950 stone-lined sloping bank wraps around two sides of Block D and continues along the northeast side of Block E. Concrete stairs ascend this stone bank between Blocks D and E.

All other retaining walls and garden beds throughout the grounds are not of heritage significance.

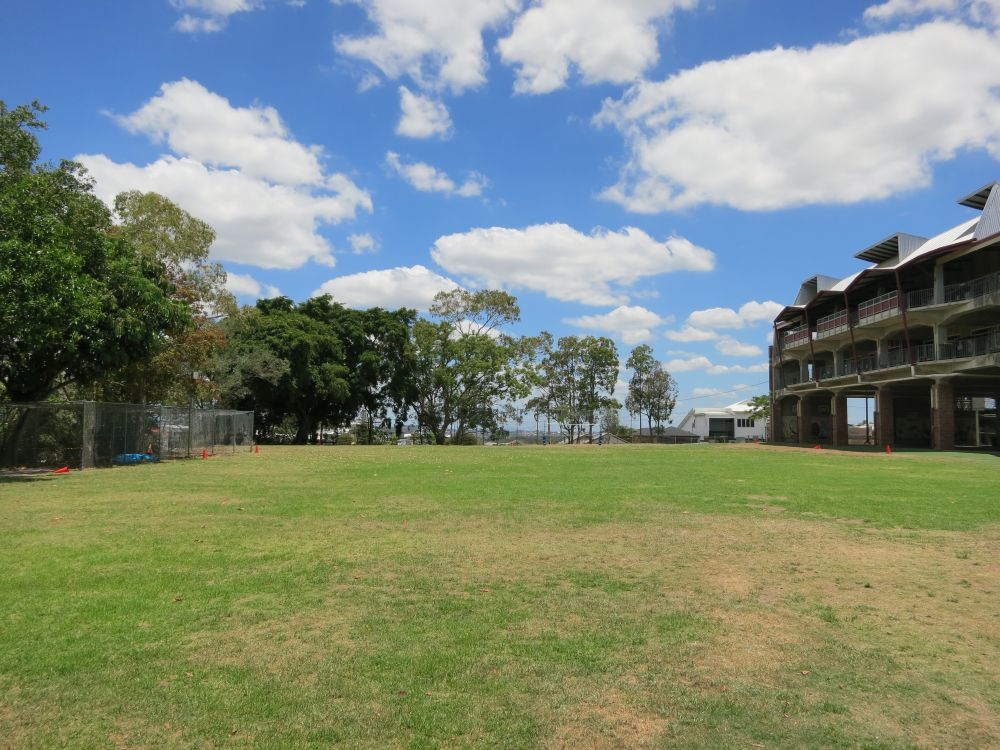
Looking southeast across playing field, 2016

=== Grounds ===
The school grounds contain mature trees, including a large fig (possibly a weeping fig, ficus benjamina) and two camphor laurels (cinnamomum camphora) planted along the Agnew Street boundary behind the retaining wall; and a large fig and camphor laurel at the southern corner of the playing field.

The playing field is a large raised and levelled platform edged by embankments and trees on the southwest, southeast and northeast sides.

An old school bell is mounted on a metal pole located in a garden bed between blocks C and E. Also in this area is a memorial plaque commemorating the centenary of Norman Park State School, unveiled on 10 June 2000.

=== Views ===
Due to its high position, extensive views of suburbs to the south and west and towards the Brisbane CBD are obtained from the school grounds along Agnew Street; and to the north and northeast from the grounds along Hipwood Street. The Agnew Street entrance, flanked by mature trees which frame views towards Block A, makes an important contribution to the streetscape.

== Heritage listing ==
Norman Park State School was listed on the Queensland Heritage Register on 7 April 2017 having satisfied the following criteria.

The place is important in demonstrating the evolution or pattern of Queensland's history.

Norman Park State School (established in 1900) is important in demonstrating the evolution of state education and its associated architecture in Queensland. The place retains excellent, representative examples of government designs that were architectural responses to prevailing government educational philosophies, set in landscaped grounds with sporting facilities and mature trees.

The urban brick school building (1900) represents the culmination of years of experimentation with natural light, classroom size and elevation by the Department of Public Works (DPW), and also demonstrates the growing preference in the early 20th century for constructing brick school buildings at metropolitan schools in developing suburbs. The changes to the window arrangements in c. 1934, which allowed natural left hand lighting of newly formed classrooms, were a result of changing educational philosophies at that time.

The open-air annexe (1915) demonstrates the medical and educational theories of the period, which valued fresh air and natural light; and is important in demonstrating the development pattern of incorporating open-air classrooms into existing school complexes. The enclosure of the annexe in the 1920s demonstrates the final adaptions to the open-air classroom type to improve its functionality.

The Depression-era additions (1934) and the brick and concrete retaining walls and steps (1935) are the result of the Queensland Government's building and relief work programmes during the 1930s that stimulated the economy and provided work for men unemployed as a result of the Great Depression.

The large, suburban site with mature trees and a playing field demonstrates educational policies which promoted the importance of play and a beautiful environment in the education of children.

The place is important in demonstrating the principal characteristics of a particular class of cultural places.

Norman Park State School is important in demonstrating the principal characteristics of a Queensland state school. These include: generous, landscaped sites with mature shade trees and assembly and play areas; and teaching buildings of standard and individual designs by the Department of Public Works that incorporate understorey play areas, verandahs, and classrooms with high levels of natural light and ventilation. The school is an excellent, intact example of a suburban school complex, comprising a range of building types dating from 1900 to 1934 and incorporating later alterations.

The urban brick school building (1900, Blocks A and C) is an excellent, intact example of an individually designed urban brick school building. It demonstrates the principal characteristics of these buildings through its highset form; linear layout, with classrooms and teachers rooms accessed by verandahs; undercrofts or understoreys used as open play spaces; and loadbearing, masonry construction, supported by face brick piers and arches. It also demonstrates the use, by urban brick school buildings, of stylistic features characteristic of their era, which determined their roof forms, decorative treatment and joinery. Typically, urban brick school buildings are located in suburban areas that were growing at the time of their construction.

The open-air annexe (1915, Block D) retains its highset, timber-framed structure; sections of 1920s infill glazing; classroom width; northwest verandah (now enclosed); and intact, semi-detached teachers room.

The Depression-era additions (1934, Blocks B and E) are individually designed masonry classroom blocks designed to complement the aesthetic of the urban brick school building and complete the school's symmetrical layout. They demonstrate the principal characteristics of Depression-era brick school buildings through their two-storey form; high-quality design and materials; face brick exterior; and linear layout of classrooms, accessed by verandahs.

The place is important because of its aesthetic significance.

The early 20th-century core of Norman Park State School has aesthetic significance for its beautiful attributes as a well-composed complex of buildings unified by their consistent form, scale and materials. The symmetrical layout of these buildings remains intact and demonstrates a continuation of site planning ideals initiated by the siting of the original urban brick school building in a prominent, central position at the top of the sloping grounds. The individually designed brick school buildings have considerable architectural value for their high-quality materials and decorative features. The core's setting is beautified by mature trees and formal landscaping elements such as retaining walls and stairs.

The school is significant for its contribution to the Agnew Street streetscape. Standing on an elevated site, with the main façade framed by mature trees and accessed via a sequence of formal entrance stairs, the school is an attractive and prominent feature of the area. Extensive views of the surrounding suburbs and of the Brisbane CBD are obtained from the school grounds.

The place has a strong or special association with a particular community or cultural group for social, cultural or spiritual reasons.

Schools have always played an important part in Queensland communities. They typically have significant and enduring connections with former pupils, parents, and teachers; provide a venue for social interaction and volunteer work; and are a source of pride, symbolising local progress and aspirations.

Norman Park State School has a strong and ongoing association with the surrounding community. It was established in 1900 through the fundraising efforts of the local community and generations of Norman Park children have been taught there. The place is important for its contribution to the educational development of its suburban district and is a prominent community focal point.

== Notable students ==
- Jesse Williams, professional football player
