= East Brisbane State School =

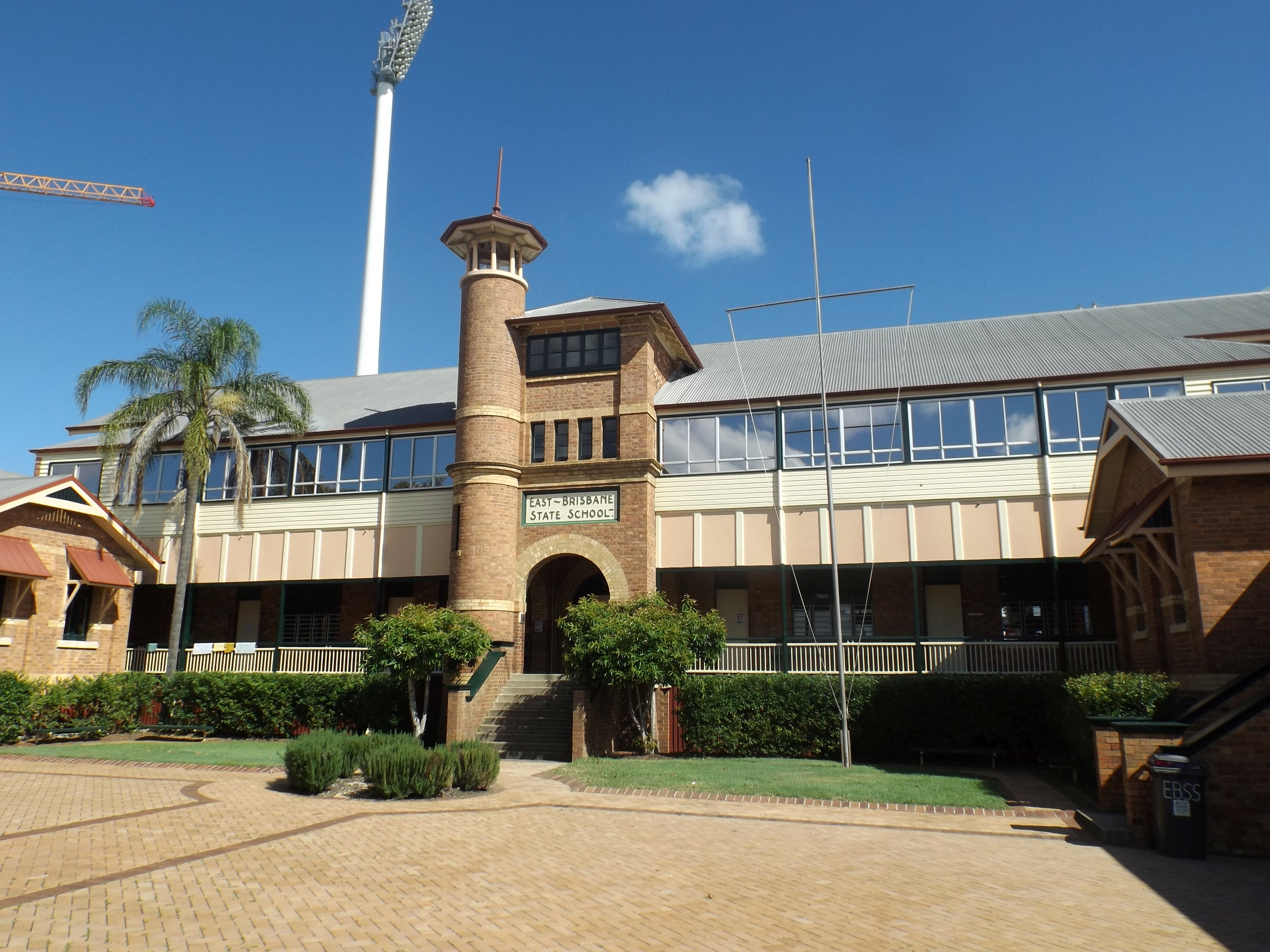
- Entrance court and building, 2015

- Location within Queensland Location within Australia
- 27.486°S 153.0395°E
- Location: 90 Wellington Road, East Brisbane, Queensland, Australia

History
- Design period: 1870s–1890s (late 19th century)
- Built: 1899–1939

Site notes
- Architect: Department of Public Works
- Architectural style: Arts & Crafts

Queensland Heritage Register
- Official name: East Brisbane State School, Brisbane East State School
- Type: state heritage (built)
- Designated: 6 November 1994
- Reference no.: 601476
- Significant period: 1890s–1930s (fabric); 1890s–1930s (historical); 1899 ongoing (social)
- Significant components: school/school room, tower – bell / belfry

East Brisbane State School (EBSS) is a heritage-listed state school at 90 Wellington Road, East Brisbane, Queensland, Australia. Designed by Department of Public Works and built from 1899 to 1939, it is located next door to The Gabba stadium. As of 2023, the school had 297 students enrolled.

It was added to the Queensland Heritage Register on 6 November 1994.

== History ==
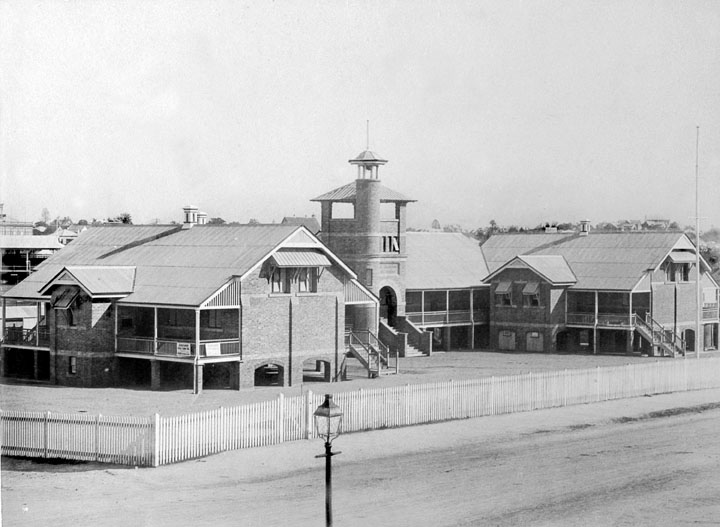
East Brisbane State School, circa 1890

East Brisbane State School (officially Brisbane East State School until September 1994) was one of the first large brick state schools in Brisbane. The original portion of the school was erected in 1899, with extensions added in 1900, 1938 and 1939. The single-storeyed timber Infants' School was erected in 1910–11.

These buildings did not replace an earlier school on the site, but were erected to cater for a rapidly escalating East Brisbane/Woolloongabba population. East Brisbane's first suburban boom was in the mid-1880s, when the larger estates, such as Mowbraytown (1884), were subdivided, but at that time no provision was made for a state school, and East Brisbane children attended state schools at South Brisbane, Kangaroo Point and Dutton Park. The Brisbane's electric tramway reached Woolloongabba/East Brisbane in 1897, and in 1901 an extension through East Brisbane to Norman Park was constructed. The provision of this cheap, efficient form of public transport encouraged working-class families to the East Brisbane area on an unprecedented scale.

The Department of Public Instruction, when recognising in 1897 the need for the establishment of a primary school in East Brisbane, underestimated the rate of population growth in the area and potential school enrolment. When the first school contract was let in 1899, it was for a brick building to cost £1,800 and to accommodate 350 pupils; the school opened on 10 July 1899 with approximately 800 students, and by the end of the year, 1008 children were enrolled. By mid-1901, the school had been extended with the addition of two classrooms and a central entrance with bell turret, at a cost of £2,323. The school could then accommodate officially 730 pupils in four large and three small classrooms.

East Brisbane State School was the first of several large brick schools constructed in Queensland around the turn of the century, in response to the population explosion which accompanied the post-Depression recovery. Norman Park State School was opened on 9 July 1900, and New Farm State School was completed in time for the start of the 1901 school year. They were designed for the Department of Public Instruction by the Government Architect's Office in the Department of Public Works, and reflected a new era of Queensland prosperity.

Alfred Barton Brady was employed with the Queensland Government as Government Architect from 1892 to 1922. Brady claimed that he always advised on arrangement, style and materials, but it appears that his Senior Assistant, Thomas Pye supervised much of the detailed design. During the 30 years they worked together in the department, Brady and Pye assembled a talented group of architects and draftsmen who were considered the equal of any in Australia, including from 1893 to 1903 John Smith Murdoch, who was to become Commonwealth Director-General of Works in 1927. From the office of the Government Architect there developed a tradition of fine government buildings, including many post offices, customs houses and court houses throughout the State. The Department of Public Instruction had handled school design and construction between 1879 and 1893, following which responsibility was returned to the Government Architect's office. Two of the most significant early 20th century schools designed by the Government Architect's office are Wooloowin State School (1914) and Windsor State School (1915–16), both of which were considered model schools when erected.

Enrolments at East Brisbane State School continued to rise during the first decade of the 20th century. A large playshed was erected during the 1907–08 financial year, and in 1910–11 a separate, single-storeyed timber Infants' School was constructed at a cost of approximately £1,000. This building measured 78 by 25 feet (23.8 by 7.6 m), and comprised two classrooms with dual desks and "kindergarten equipment", the latter being considered modern and progressive at the time.

In 1910, the Australasian United Steam Navigation Company gave to the school the bell of the SS Melbourne. This still hangs in the bell turret.

From the 1910s to the 1930s, East Brisbane grew gradually as a residential suburb. By the late 1930s, the need for increased accommodation at Brisbane East State School became acute. During the 1937–38 financial year, the Department of Public Works undertook additions costing £4,370. This comprised the extension of the northern and southern wings of the building and the remodelling of the existing portions of these wings. In the following year, a further £6,860 worth of additions was authorised; this consisted of an extra storey erected over the central block, and alterations to the lower level of this block. The extensions were completed in 1939.

The changing character of Brisbane's inner suburbs away from family homes has resulted in falling enrolments. In 2013 there were 197 children enrolled with 19 teachers (12 full-time equivalent). Many of the children have English as a second language. The trend in decreasing enrolments ended by 2017 with students enrolments continually rising from 209 in 2017 to 297 in 2023. The school is forecast to exceed its maximum allowable capacity of 309 in 2024 with expected enrolments reaching 314. Of the 297 enrolments in 2023 15.2% were from out of catchment, despite an enrolment management plan which restricts out-of-catchment students to ensure capacity is not reached. Teacher numbers have also increased to 27 (21 full-time equivalent) in line with increased enrolments.

=== Cancelled relocation ===
In 2023, it was announced that the school would be relocated to the site of Coorpooro Secondary College (CSC) by the start of the 2026 school year, due to the reconstruction of The Gabba that was originally planned for the 2032 Summer Olympics. The $100 million relocation was deemed a better outcome for the school as it could cater for the growing school body with an increased capacity of 350 students, provide more green space, and be a safer location for students as it would not be bordered by main roads. Facilities at new location would include an indoor sports hall shared with the CSC, and a new swimming pool. Barriers would be erected to separate students and buildings from each other. To facilitate this separation, some existing buildings at CSC were to be demolished, and the Brisbane School of Distance Education's facilities could be relocated from the "underutilised site".

The relocation was unpopular with employees and students at both schools. In March 2024, the school was spared after the Gabba project was scrapped by Premier Steven Miles; an independent review found the project to be too costly.

== Description ==
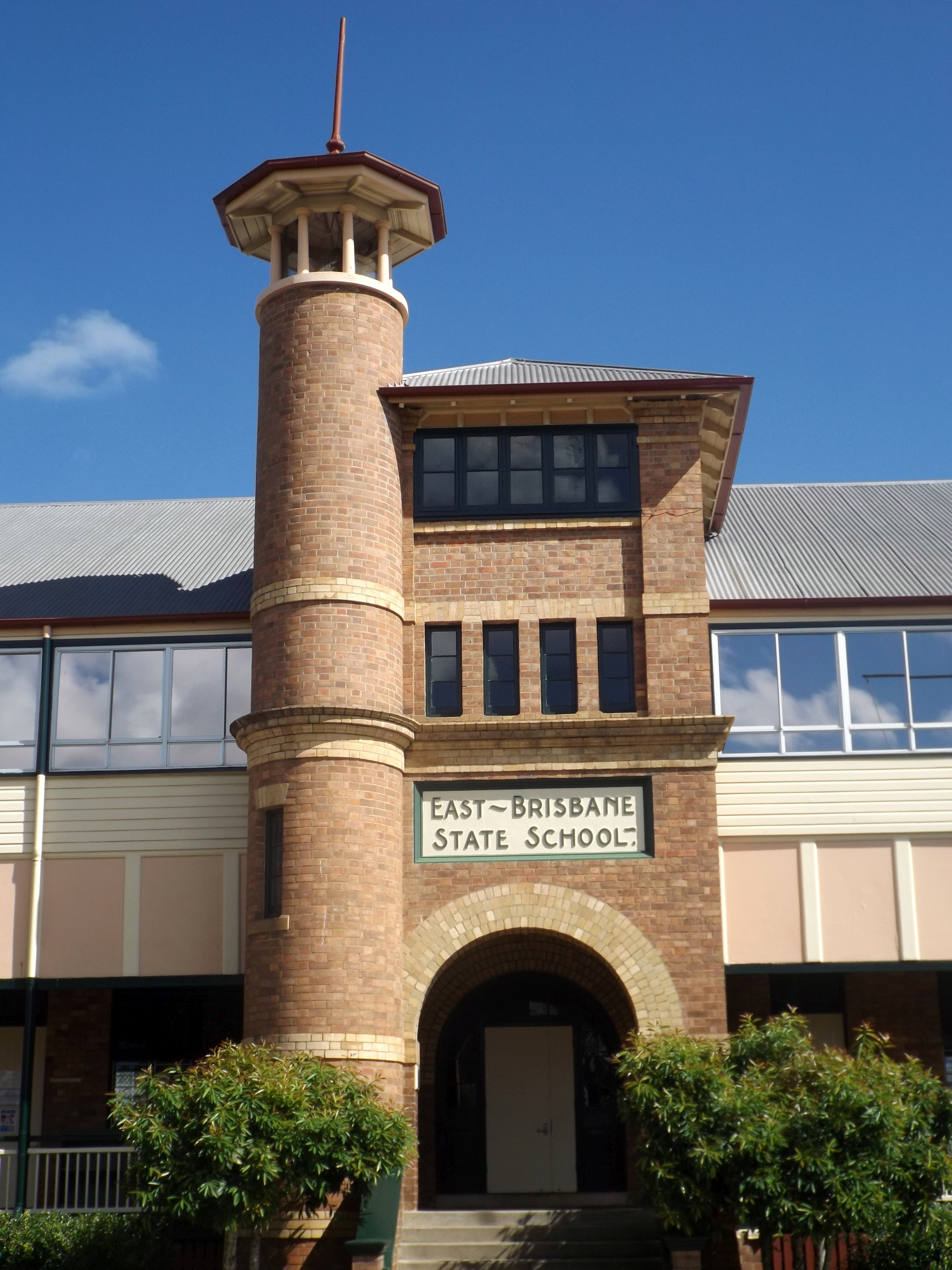
Tower and bell turret, 2015

The East Brisbane State School is a brick building with a two-storeyed central section and two projecting single-storeyed wings flanking an entrance court. The roof is of corrugated iron. The entrance to the building is marked by a tower with a bell turret and the name of the school in decorative lettering, over a flight of stairs to an arched porch. Originally the central block was single-storeyed and in 1939 the upper floor was added. The projecting single-storeyed wings have also been extended. Some of the verandahs have been enclosed.

The walls are of polychrome brickwork. Internally the walls are rendered to a height of 6 feet (1.8 m) above the floor, beyond that height the brickwork being kalsomined. In the 1899 section, the roof members are of light wrought iron, with ceilings of diagonal pine boarding.

The under part of the school is open for play grounds and is asphalted. The rooms are well lighted from high gable windows; outlet ventilation from panels in the ceilings is conducted through iron tubing and Boyle's ventilators.

== Heritage listing ==
East Brisbane State School was listed on the Queensland Heritage Register on 6 November 1994 having satisfied the following criteria.

The place is important in demonstrating the evolution or pattern of Queensland's history.

East Brisbane State School survives as evidence of the rapid growth of East Brisbane and Woolloongabba which accompanied the expansion of public transport in Brisbane around the turn of the 19th century. Both the population boom and the substantial brick buildings at East Brisbane State School are illustrative of the late 1890s/early 1900s economic high on which Queensland entered the 20th century.

East Brisbane State School is significant as one of the first large State Schools in Brisbane.

The place is important in demonstrating the principal characteristics of a particular class of cultural places.

The use of brick and restrained detailing is typical for government buildings of the period. The building displays characteristics of the style through its simple massing, contrasting materials and central tower.

The place is important because of its aesthetic significance.

East Brisbane State School is significant as an outstanding example of a school building designed by the office of the Queensland Government Architect, which at the time was the equal of any architectural office in Australia.
