= Kardinia, Townsville =

Kardinia, North Ward
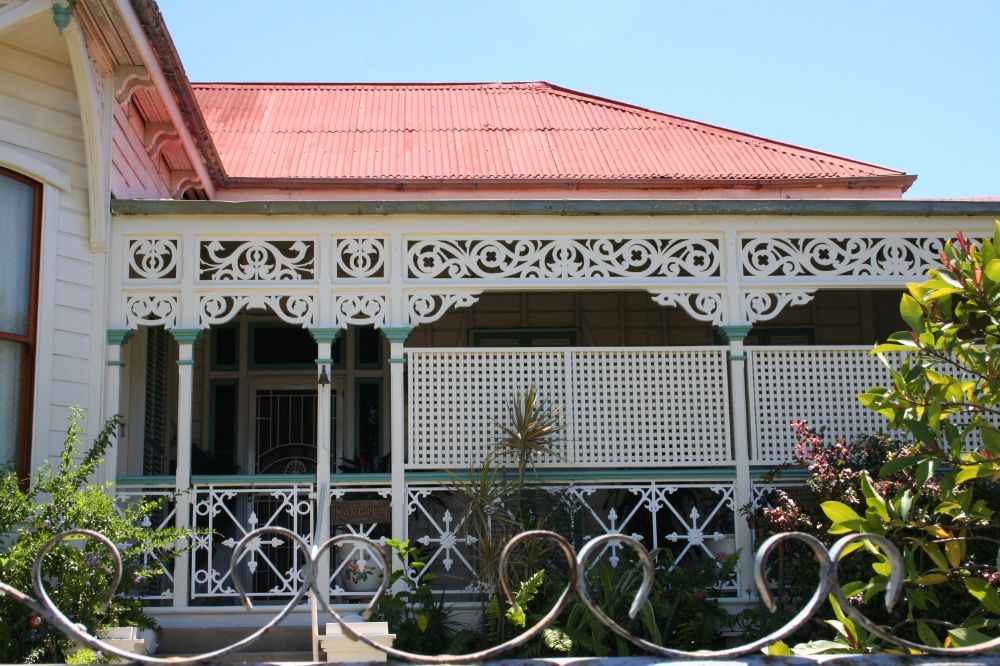
- Kardinia, 2006

- Location within Queensland Location within Australia
- 19.2561°S 146.8114°E
- Location: 11 Victoria Street, North Ward, City of Townsville, Queensland, Australia

History
- Design period: 1870s–1890s (late 19th century)
- Built: 1880s

Queensland Heritage Register
- Official name: Kardinia, Japanese Consulate
- Type: state heritage (landscape, built)
- Designated: 21 October 1992
- Reference no.: 600938
- Significant period: 1880, 1910s (fabric); 1880s–1900s (historical)
- Significant components: service wing, residential accommodation – main house, garden/grounds, dining room, fence/wall – perimeter

Kardinia is a heritage-listed detached house at 11 Victoria Street, North Ward, City of Townsville, Queensland, Australia. It was built in the 1880s. It is also known as Japanese Consulate. It was added to the Queensland Heritage Register on 21 October 1992.

== History ==
Kardinia, a decorative, single-storeyed timber residence, was erected during the boom years of the 1880s.

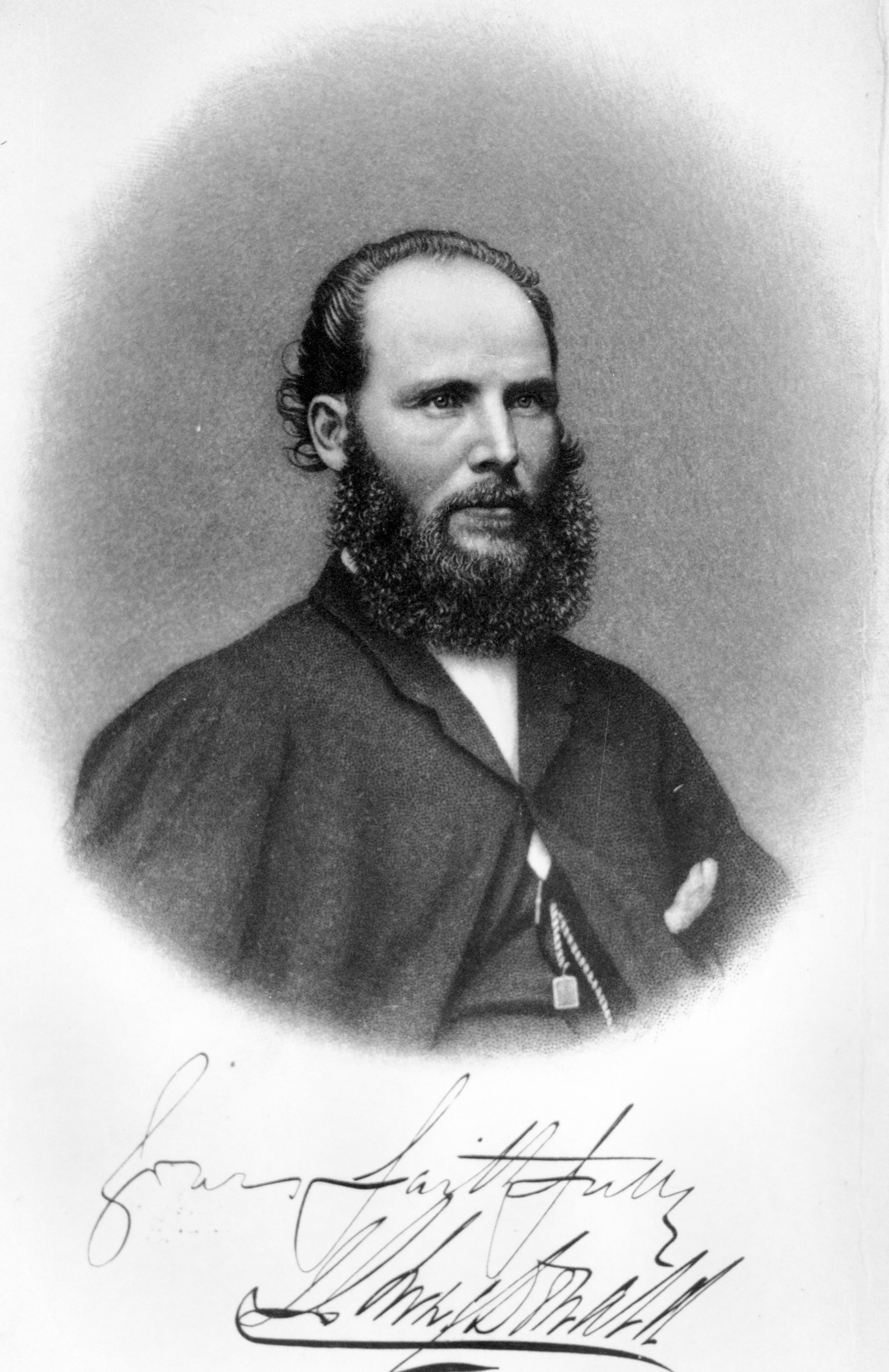
John Graham MacDonald, 1865

The site was first purchased in April 1883 by Arthur Walters, and sold by November that year to Edward Bevan, a surveyor then in partnership with Christian Waagepetersen as Waagepetersen and Bevan, architects, surveyors and agents, Townsville. By 1883 Bevan was also editor of the Daily Northern Standard, a Townsville publication, and became well known as an artist and writer. It is not known whether Walters or Bevan erected a house on the site, but physical evidence suggests that the original building comprised just 2 rooms with a surrounding verandah, and was enlarged subsequently to create the present form. Bevan was resident on Stanton Hill by 16 June 1884, when his son Guy Felix was born, and in September 1886 took out a £400 mortgage on the property, which may have financed the renovations. Title to the property was transferred in August 1888 to John Graham MacDonald, explorer, pastoralist, and police magistrate of Townsville from May 1888 to April 1899. In August 1889, Macdonald also took out a mortgage of £1,400 on the property, but whether it was he, or Bevan, who commissioned the renovations, has not been established. Photographic evidence suggests that the house was enlarged, and had acquired its unusual asymmetrical facade, by c. 1889.

Macdonald was one of the first Europeans to explore the area between Bowen and the Gulf of Carpentaria, and later invested in northern pastoral properties such as Carpentaria Downs, in partnership with Robert Towns and Sir John Robertson. After the pastoral slump of the mid-1880s, Macdonald took up the important position of police magistrate in Townsville, and played a significant role in the life of the town.

Macdonald resided at Kardinia from c. 1888 until c. 1895, and from 1896 to 1908 leased the house to the Japanese Government as Australia's first Japanese consulate, servicing the needs of the growing number of Japanese living in North Queensland, and promoting improved trade relations between Australia and Japan. After the consulate moved to Sydney in 1908 the house was occupied by prominent Townsville businessman, alderman, mayor and civic worker John Newport Parkes, at which time the name Kardinia is first listed in the Queensland Post Office Directory. In 1911 title to the property transferred from Macdonald to Alberta Green, wife of prominent North Queensland newspaper proprietor and editor, Humphrey (David) Green. The Green family played a prominent role in the newspaper industry of North Queensland for more than half a century. During their occupancy the house was visited often by the noted North Queensland journalist and author Edmund James Banfield ("Beachcomber") who was a lifelong friend of the family. Kardinia remained the property of the Green family until sold in 1984.

== Description ==
Kardinia is a substantial, high-set timber residence occupying a commanding position on top of Stanton Hill overlooking the central business district of Townsville. Some external walls have an exposed stud frame while others are lined on the outside. It has a corrugated iron gabled roof. The house is raised on brick piers with some more modern concrete piers.

The house has an unusual asymmetrical facade and a U-shaped plan form, reflecting five periods of extension. A central hallway, with large rooms opening off it, extends the length of the main body of the building. To the left of this hallway there are two rooms which are divided by a large cedar arch. To the right, all the rooms open onto the verandah through french doors which have fanlights decorated with etched glass and fretwork. The verandah balustrading is made of cast-iron in a design found in only a few houses in North Queensland. An elaborate wooden frieze extends the full length of the verandah and early timber venetian blinds provide shade and privacy. The rear section, once open verandah, was enclosed to create extra rooms and a bathroom. The service wing which originally contained a maid's room or pantry, kitchen and scullery was converted into a kitchen, possible in 1912. A large dining room was added in 1912 across the rear verandah from the service wing, together with a room built under the house where the land falls away. The windows in this area are of unusual painted glass.

== Heritage listing ==
Kardinia was listed on the Queensland Heritage Register on 21 October 1992 having satisfied the following criteria.

The place is important in demonstrating the evolution or pattern of Queensland's history.

Kardinia, erected in the 1880s, is significant historically, architecturally, aesthetically and socially. As the first Japanese consulate in Australia, it was connected with important events in Australian-Japanese trade and diplomatic relations, and illustrates the important connection between Japanese migration and North Queensland in the late 19th/early 20th centuries.

The place demonstrates rare, uncommon or endangered aspects of Queensland's cultural heritage.

As a colonial house, Kardinia is unusual because of its asymmetric facade which was a rare design feature until after the depression of the 1890s.

The place is important in demonstrating the principal characteristics of a particular class of cultural places.

The building also is important in illustrating the principal characteristics of the prestigious type of timber house built in Townsville in the latter part of the 19th century.

The place is important because of its aesthetic significance.

Kardinia, erected in the 1880s, is significant historically, architecturally, aesthetically and socially.

The place has a special association with the life or work of a particular person, group or organisation of importance in Queensland's history.

The place is significant for its strong associations with several prominent people in Townsville, including police magistrate John Graham Macdonald and newspaper editor and proprietor David Green, and for its associations with the work of the Japanese government in establishing consular services for its nationals resident in North Queensland.
