= Queens Gardens, Townsville =

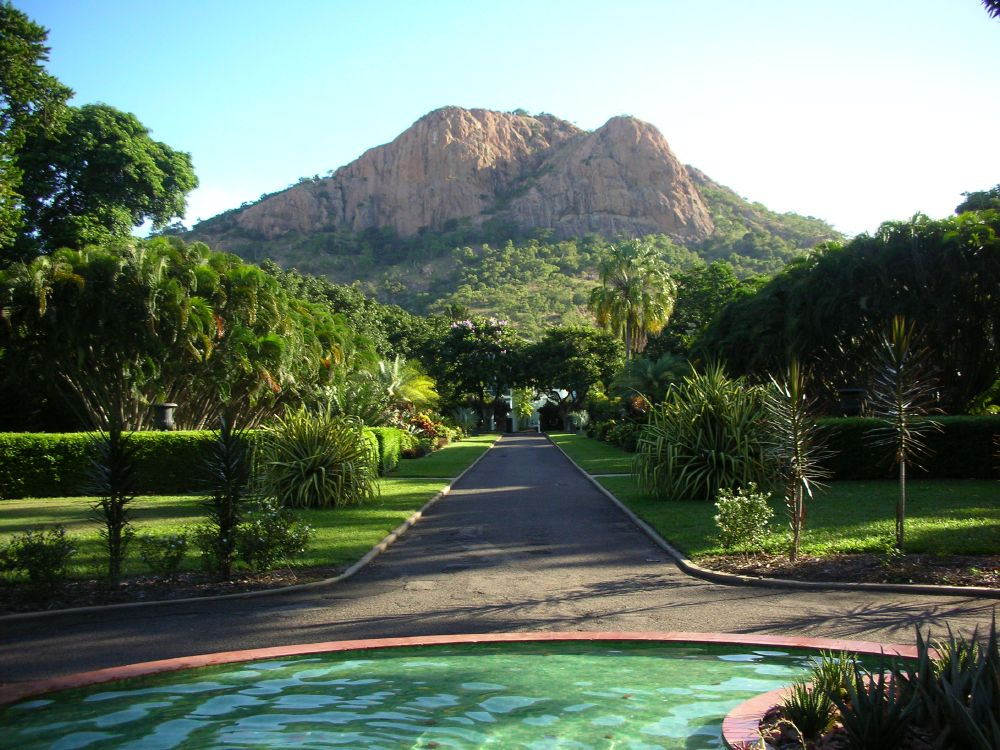
- Queens Gardens, 2009

- Location within Queensland
- 19.2531°S 146.81°E
- Location: Paxton Street, North Ward, City of Townsville, Queensland, Australia

History
- Design period: 1824–1841 (convict settlement)

Queensland Heritage Register
- Official name: Queens Gardens
- Type: state heritage (landscape, built)
- Designated: 14 August 2008
- Reference no.: 601765
- Significant period: 1870–
- Significant components: garden – rock / rockery, garden – rainforest, garden/grounds, garden – ornamental/flower, garden – layout, garden – bed/s, garden furniture/seating, garden – native

Queens Gardens is a large heritage-listed botanic garden at Paxton Street, North Ward, City of Townsville, Queensland, Australia. Queens Gardens is located at the base of Castle Hill, near to both the city centre and The Strand beachside park. It has been called Townsville's finest park. It was added to the Queensland Heritage Register in 2008.

The gardens were formally established in 1870, and known at that time as the Botanical Gardens Reserve. They represented an acclimatisation garden, part of the colonial town's agricultural planning for both local food supply and development of farming industry. Initially 100 acres (40 ha) of land was set aside for a variety of exotic species, including cocoa, African oil palms and mangoes. Some of the hoop pines and black beans (Castanospermum australe) planted at that time are still growing today and may be the oldest cultivated specimens in Australia.

In the late nineteenth century the garden began a transformation into a formal recreational park. This was briefly interrupted during World War II when Queens Gardens acted as a military base for 100,000 American soldiers. The gardens were extensively redesigned in 1959 by Mr. Alan Wilson (Superintendent of Parks) who also designed Townsville's arboretum, Anderson Gardens. Due to the needs of the growing city for central sporting grounds and residential development, the gardens are currently one tenth their original size.

== History ==

Queens Gardens is the surviving 10 acres (4.0 ha) remnant of Townsville's former 100 acres (40 ha) Botanical Gardens Reserve (Queens Park) proclaimed on 14 June 1870.

Nineteenth century gazetted botanic gardens were more commonly known as Queens Parks, named in commemoration of Queen Victoria who reigned as monarch of the British Empire from 1836 to 1901. These places attracted strong public patronage and each was considered the premium park of a town. The first Queens Park was a section of the Brisbane Botanic Gardens. A subsequent botanic garden at Ipswich was called Queens Park.

From its beginning the gardens at Townsville have evolved in area, planning and design, as well as through their plant collection and community use. Initially the reserve was established to serve and support the role specific to Botanic Gardens across the country, which focused on botany as science, economic botany, education of the public about plants and horticulture and ornamental botany. The first of these functions for botanic gardens was a response to increasing nineteenth century interest in a scientific understanding of the natural world, where widespread enthusiasm for plant identification and cultivation had developed after the industrial revolution. Economic botany refers to the cultivation of plants within the botanic garden's exotic environment with a view to contributing to the economy of the local region and the colony as a whole, and involved acclimatising, cultivating and testing plants of commercial value. Ornamental botany recognised that human perspectives on nature were not totally focused on use, but also on the more aesthetic qualities of horticulture.

By the end of the nineteenth century, an international network of regional botanic gardens was established, extending throughout the British Empire, and with the Royal Botanic Gardens, Kew as the key centre for botanical information and collections. Gardens were established in most major towns in Queensland, with Townsville's botanic gardens being included on an 1868 survey plan.

However, the size of the original reserve in Townsville and its proximity to the city centre resulted in town planning leases and excising of reserve land to accommodate public recreation and institutions. The first successful incursion into the reserve was made by the Townsville Cricket Club, which applied for space in the northeast corner of the Gardens to build a pitch. A major division of the Garden Reserve took place in 1886 when the trustees of the Townsville Grammar School were granted 10 acres (4.0 ha) on Paxton Street. In exchange, the Minister of Lands accepted the 25-acre (10 ha) Norman Reserve, a Reserve for Grammar School Purposes, in the name of the Botanical Gardens Trustees. The Norman Reserve, which was located nearby on Kissing Point, was never utilised as a Botanical Reserve and was included in the Reserve for Defence Purposes established on Kissing Point in 1889.

In the same year that the Botanic Gardens was gazetted as a park (1887), Burke Street was extended through the Reserve to Paxton Street. Significant incursions into the reserve included a Gaol Reserve and Reserve for a Lunatic Reception House in the southeast corner (1885) and a reserve for sport and recreation (12 acres (4.9 ha) in 1899). By 1915, the Reserve was reduced to 35 acres (14 ha), with leases being issued to the Croquet Club (1924). The final carving up of the Botanical Gardens took place in 1948 when part of the reserve was leased to the Townsville Bowling Club and part excised as a recreation reserve. The Botanical Gardens was thus reduced to 10 acres (4.0 ha), its present size.

The Townsville Municipal Council initially received no government funding for the gardens and did little towards getting them established. Funding continued to be a problem even after 1878 when William Anderson was appointed as the first "curator and practical gardener". Anderson resided on site in a cottage constructed for his appointment until he retired in 1934. At this time, a new cottage was built and the original cottage was reused as a nursery.

Anderson was given no power to purchase plants nor was he given funds to establish the gardens. By 1880, because of the Municipal Council's inaction, the gardens had been removed from its control and trustees appointed by the Queensland Government. Among these trustees was Thomas Allen Gulliver Jnr, who had previously collected botanical material in Tasmania and North Queensland for Baron Ferdinand Von Mueller, Curator of the Melbourne Botanical Gardens and later Victorian Government Botanist. Thomas Gulliver and his brother, Benjamin Thomas Gulliver, had several plants collected from the Gulf of Carpentaria and Arnhem Land named in their honour. Baron von Mueller devoted his life to the study of systematic biology, and was the finest botanist in the southern hemisphere, describing and naming over 2000 Australian species and distributing Australian plants across the world.

Improvements in funding for the Townsville Botanic Gardens followed the appointment of trustees and, as planting and landscaping gradually proceeded, the gardens became a popular place for picnics and concerts. The Queensland Acclimatisation Society, which was formed in 1862, supplied initial plantings. Trees were also supplied from Anthelme le Thozet's garden of exotic trees and shrubs in Rockhampton, central Queensland. Le Thozet was internationally renowned as a collector of plant specimens, and is most remembered for Muellerville, the experimental garden where he cultivated many trees and plants in order to determine their economic value and suitability for Queensland's tropical climate. Other trees were sent from Brisbane to Townsville by Walter Hill, the Curator of the Brisbane Botanical Gardens, who had visited Townsville in 1873. Walter Hill made a major contribution to the development of commercial crops in Queensland, supported the work of the Queensland Acclimatisation Society and was instrumental in establishing the network of botanic gardens in Queensland.

However, funding for the Townsville Botanic Gardens continued to be scarce and the curator was forced to introduce charges for the use of the gardens for public functions, picnics and musical entertainments. Nevertheless, William Anderson was able to supply young trees to various bodies around North Queensland. Under a government subsidy scheme plants were supplied to the Ravenswood Park Committee, state schools at Croydon, Irvinebank and Black Jack and to many groups around Townsville. Plants were also exchanged with Botanical Gardens in Melbourne, Brisbane, Rockhampton and Port Darwin.

Anderson managed Queens Gardens within the parameters for which it was established as a trial garden for tropical economic plants. Some of the earliest recorded exotic fruit plantings included an acre of grape vines, along with cocoa nut trees (1896), coffee (1889), breadfruit (1899) and mangoes. Timber species included mahogany (1887), hoop pines and red cedar (1892). The majority of tropical tree species were planted around the perimeter of the gardens and included various figs, rain trees and an avenue of black bean.

The Agricultural and Pastoral exhibits of the first Townsville exhibition were held in August 1880 at the Botanical Gardens Reserve.

In 1893, the Council again took over responsibility for the gardens. Planting and landscaping gradually improved during the gardens' formative years and by 1894, the place was involved in propagation, experimentation and exchange thus contributing to the network of botanical gardens. Initially the gardens focussed on the traditional functions for botanic gardens, however the late nineteenth century saw the introduction of the popular Paradise style, which gave the gardens a pleasure ground image. In 1898, after various conflicts over the management of the Gardens, the Townsville Municipal Council successfully requested the resignation of the trustees. From that time on the Gardens were maintained as a park, rather than botanical gardens.

The gardens became extremely popular with local residents during the 1880s and 1890s. Council records indicate that in 1890 the Rose Bud Club held a Gypsy Tea in Queens Gardens. Further photographic evidence of a garden party given by Baron Northcote, the Australian Governor-General c. 1905 and another event c. 1916 support the view that the gardens were utilised early as a place for special events. The proximity to the Townsville General Hospital also resulted in heavy visitor use.

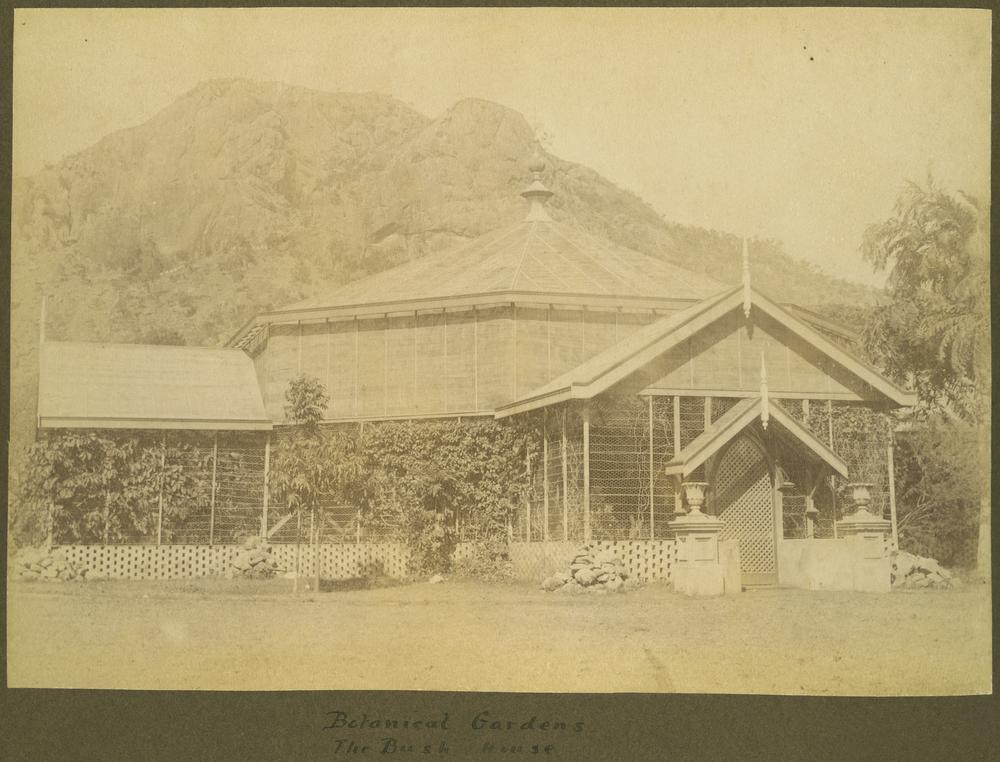
Bush House at the Townsville Botanical Gardens, circa 1900

A bush-house designed by local architects and civil engineers Tunbridge and Tunbridge was constructed in 1889. This structure and a kiosk were destroyed by Cyclone Leonta in March 1903 and the 1878 curator's cottage badly damaged.

Photographs reveal that the central avenue with line of sight to Castle Hill was a feature by 1890. Former structures include an orchid house, a hipped roof aviary (c.1938) and the 1878 curator's cottage. Evidence of ornament artefacts includes a moulded terrazzo urn (1957) as the central focus of the formal gardens and a large arched trellis as a feature of the rose garden. The urn originally featured a statue in its centre and four stylised birds surrounding its rim.

Queens Park was utilised as a military base for both Australian and American units during World War II. No. 6 Transportation and Movements Office, Company D of the 800th Military Police Brigade and a Stockade were based in Queens Park during 1942–1945. Initially accommodation was in tents until demountable buildings were constructed. During this period the large trees were preserved.

In 1959 the Council employed Alan Wilson, former Assistant Landscape Architect with the Brisbane City Council Parks Department, to redesign the Gardens as Superintendent of Parks and Reserves for Townsville. Photographic evidence indicates that Queens Park continued in a limited capacity as an experimental botanic garden until the 1959 redesign. It was renamed Queens Gardens at this time to honour Queen Elizabeth II.

Jim Thomas, former superintendent of the Royal Botanic Gardens in Sydney and trained in the Royal Botanical Gardens, Kew, succeeded Alan Wilson as Superintendent in 1968. Thomas continued to maintain the Wilson designed Queens Gardens and was instrumental in saving many nineteenth century trees after Cyclone Althea severely damaged the gardens in 1971.

In the latter half of the twentieth century, the gardens gained further popularity as a venue for ceremonies such as weddings and major events, including VP50 celebrations and the annual Eco Fiesta. Except for a few minor modifications, the 1959 layout of the gardens has been maintained.

== Description ==
Townsville's Queens Gardens has a formal mid-twentieth century design in which early Victorian elements have been retained. These include open lawns, a small zoological section and formal garden beds. Castle Hill forms a dramatic backdrop to the Gardens, complementing the placement of trees, shrubs, and decorative bedding plants.

The Queens Gardens planting is organised on both an ecological and generic system. On the perimeter are straight avenues of tropical rainforest trees planted in 1887. Dominating the eastern boundary is an avenue of black bean (Castanospermum australe), some of which are original plantings. Along the southern boundary in the precinct known as the rainforest walk are a variety of botanical, historical and visually significant trees such as the mahogany tree from the West Indies (Swietenia mahagoni), the large banyan (Ficus retusa); the rain tree (Samanea saman); and the native carbeen (Eucalyptus tessellaris). The rainforest walk contains about 166 species of trees, shrubs and groundcovers, representative of the dry rainforest environments of North Queensland.

The main entrance to the Gardens is via the north-west entry gate on Paxton Street. The gate and fence consist of red brick gateposts and black-painted metal fence and gates. The second entrance is via the south-west entry gate on Gregory Street. A pedestrian path system comprises two tertiary paths, being the southeast-northwest and northeast-southwest paths in a classic "T" layout. The secondary path system circumnavigates and connects the "T" axis.

The formal entrance draws pedestrians down the southeast-northwest axis, which is flanked on either side by mirrored golden cane palms, formal annual beds and mazes. The granite rock face of Castle Hill dominates the vista of the southeast-northwest pedestrian path. The southeast-northwest and northeast-southwest paths intersect the central axis fountain, which is enclosed by a vine arbour and seating. Adjacent to the central fountain feature is a significant mango (Mangifera indica) and governors plum trees (Flacourtia jangomas).

The northern quadrant of the site contains a number of significant structures, artefacts and plantings. Aviaries and an adjacent vine arbour are a popular feature of the gardens, housing a variety of native parrots and farm birds. Behind the aviaries is the relocated and altered curators cottage (c.1878 and 1934). North of the aviaries past a herb garden is the secluded rose garden, which is enclosed on one side by columns transferred from the original Townsville Town Hall. This layout is a copy of the early twentieth century formal garden and includes the moulded terrazzo urn (1957) as the central focus.

The south-eastern half of the garden comprises open lawns and shady trees. Many of the trees in this area have historic and botanic significance, for example the hoop pine (Araucaria cunninghamii), oil palm (Elaeis guineensis) and tamarind (Tamarindus indica). A small playground with a few simple swings is located in the far northern corner, with easy access via Kennedy Lane. The playground is not considered to be of cultural heritage significance.

Special areas include the Events Lawn with magnificent trees, a formal rose garden, the Herb Society's garden, a perennial border, two hedged mazes, frangipani collection, a rainforest walk and the black bean (also known as Moreton Bay chestnuts) avenue. There is also a small aviary featuring peacocks, lorikeets and sulfur-crested cockatoos. The gardens were extensively damaged during Cyclone Yasi but is covering well. There are several sites well suited to outdoor weddings and similar events.

== Heritage listing ==
Queens Gardens was listed on the Queensland Heritage Register on 14 August 2008 having satisfied the following criteria.

The place is important in demonstrating the evolution or pattern of Queensland's history.

Townsville's Queens Gardens demonstrates the development and continued management of a botanic garden in a regional city as a significant theme in the evolution and pattern of Queensland's history. The place has fulfilled the traditional functions of a botanic garden, including increasing horticultural knowledge about local plants with a view to developing their economic potential, sharing of this knowledge and seed stock nationally with like-minded institutions, and providing an attractive and educative venue for public recreation. As a regional botanic garden and part of the Queensland botanic gardens network, Queens Gardens has maintained a position within a national and international network of botanic gardens of which the Royal Botanic Gardens, Kew in London, was the originating hub.

The place is important in demonstrating the principal characteristics of a particular class of cultural places.

The place is an important example of a Queensland botanic garden and demonstrates the principal characteristics of a substantial tropical public botanic garden that has evolved over time. Founded on ideological principles, Townsville Queens Gardens, as part of the Queensland botanic gardens network, is a clear and identifiable type of place, with congruous hard and soft landscape features.

The place is important because of its aesthetic significance.

The combination of mature vegetation, open lawns and well-kept gardens provides an oasis close to the city centre. The gardens offer sensory aesthetic experiences engendered by the visual, auditory and olfactory qualities of the place that have been appreciated by the community over a long period of time. The gardens are enhanced by the landmark quality of Castle Hill's granite rock face, an important feature of the southeast-northwest vista.

The place has a strong or special association with a particular community or cultural group for social, cultural or spiritual reasons.

The place, established as both a scientific and a pleasure garden, has continued this association and has evolved as a focus for community events. It has social significance as a long-used and popular reserve for public recreation.

== See also ==
There are two other botanical gardens in Townsville:

- Anderson Park, Townsville
- The Palmetum, Townsville
