= Townsville Astronomical Trigonometrical Station =

- Location within Queensland Location within Australia
- 19.2553°S 146.8131°E
- Location: Stanton Hill, North Ward, City of Townsville, Queensland, Australia

History
- Design period: 1870s–1890s (late 19th century)
- Built: 1891

Site notes
- Architect: Robert Hoggan

Queensland Heritage Register
- Official name: Townsville Astronomical Trigonometrical Station, Townsville Observatory
- Type: state heritage (built)
- Designated: 21 October 1992
- Reference no.: 600926
- Significant period: 1891 (fabric)

Townsville Astronomical Trigonometrical Station is a heritage-listed triangulation station at Stanton Hill, North Ward, City of Townsville, Queensland, Australia. It was designed by Robert Hoggan and built in 1891. It is also known as Townsville Observatory. It was added to the Queensland Heritage Register on 21 October 1992.

== History ==
In 1891 an astronomical observatory and trigonometrical (trig) station were constructed at the top of Stanton Hill in Townsville, to the design of government surveyor and astronomer Robert Hoggan. The observatory no longer survives, but the concrete trig station remains.

In the late 19th century, trig stations were erected in most of the principal towns of Queensland, as part of the first attempt to map Queensland on a large scale using common data. Despite the passage of years this data remains important because of its comparative value for modern surveyors. Most of the Queensland trig stations were timber posts, only remnants of which survive, erected to support a theodolite which measured vertical and horizontal lines. At Townsville and Thursday Island, concrete pillars rather than timber posts were erected, and these have survived largely because of their more substantial construction.

Although surveyors no longer need to use the Townsville trig station, it is still in a serviceable condition.

== Description ==
The Townsville Astronomical Trigonometrical Station is situated on the northern boundary of a home units complex which occupies the summit of Stanton Hill.

It is constructed of concrete and is cone shaped. The pillar stands 1.5 metres (4 ft 11 in) high by 0.3 metres (1 ft 0 in) in diameter with three holes in the top, which supported the theodolite.

A paved area and gardens surround the trig station.

== Heritage listing ==
Townsville Astronomical Trigonometrical Station was listed on the Queensland Heritage Register on 21 October 1992 having satisfied the following criteria.

The place is important in demonstrating the evolution or pattern of Queensland's history.

The Townsville Astronomical Trigonometrical Station, erected in 1891, is significant for its historical role in land surveying in Queensland, and typologically, as one of only two concrete astronomical trig stations constructed in Queensland in the 19th century.

The place demonstrates rare, uncommon or endangered aspects of Queensland's cultural heritage.

The Townsville Astronomical Trigonometrical Station, erected in 1891, is significant for its historical role in land surveying in Queensland, and typologically, as one of only two concrete astronomical trig stations constructed in Queensland in the 19th century. As one of only two surviving Queensland 19th century trig stations, the other being at Thursday Island, the place has rarity value.

The place is important in demonstrating the principal characteristics of a particular class of cultural places.

The Townsville Astronomical Trigonometrical Station, erected in 1891, is significant for its historical role in land surveying in Queensland, and typologically, as one of only two concrete astronomical trig stations constructed in Queensland in the 19th century.
