= Castle Hill, Townsville =

Granite monolith in Queensland, Australia

Coordinates: 19.2584°S 146.8005°E

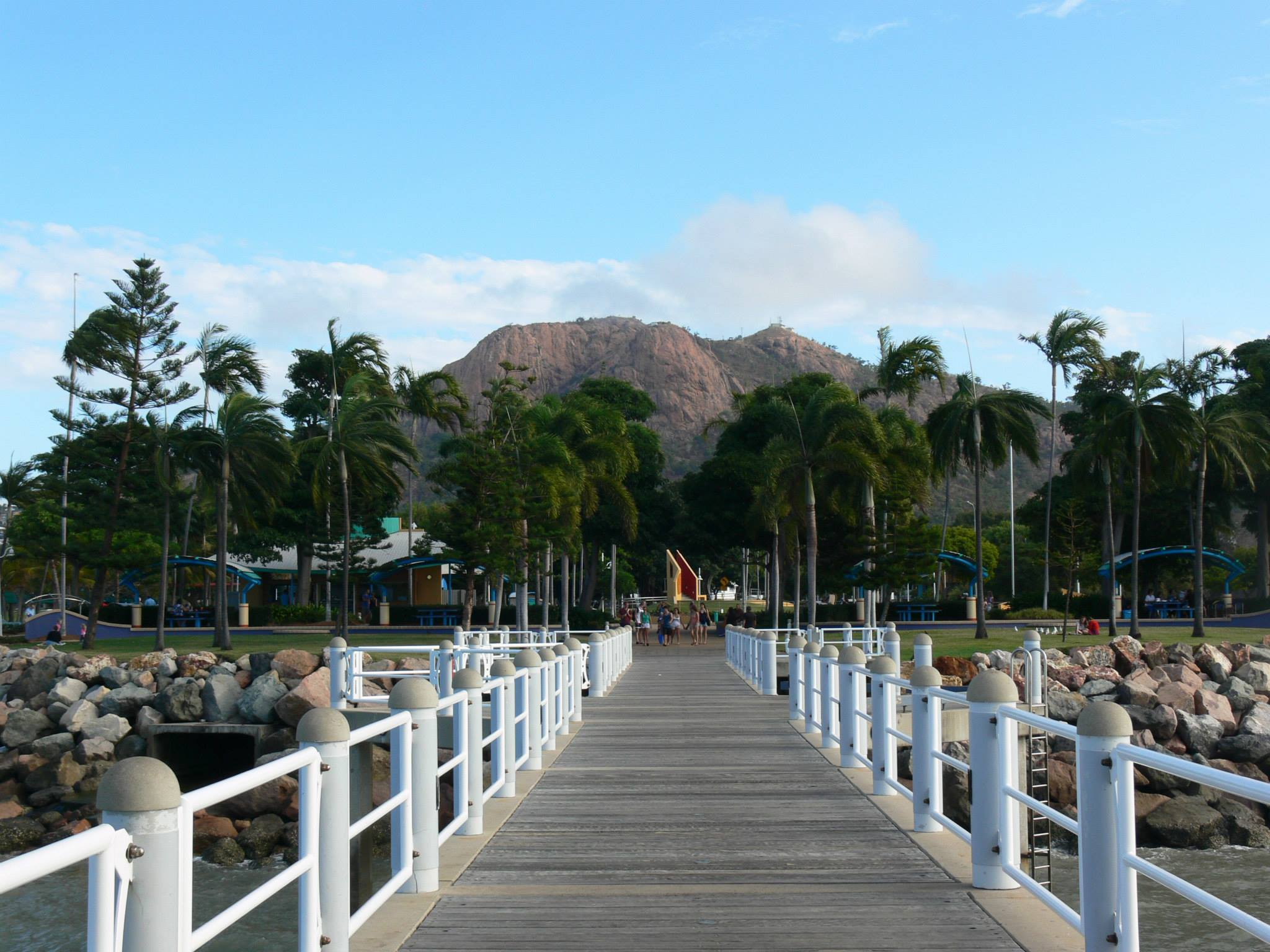
Castle Hill as seen from the Strand, Townsville

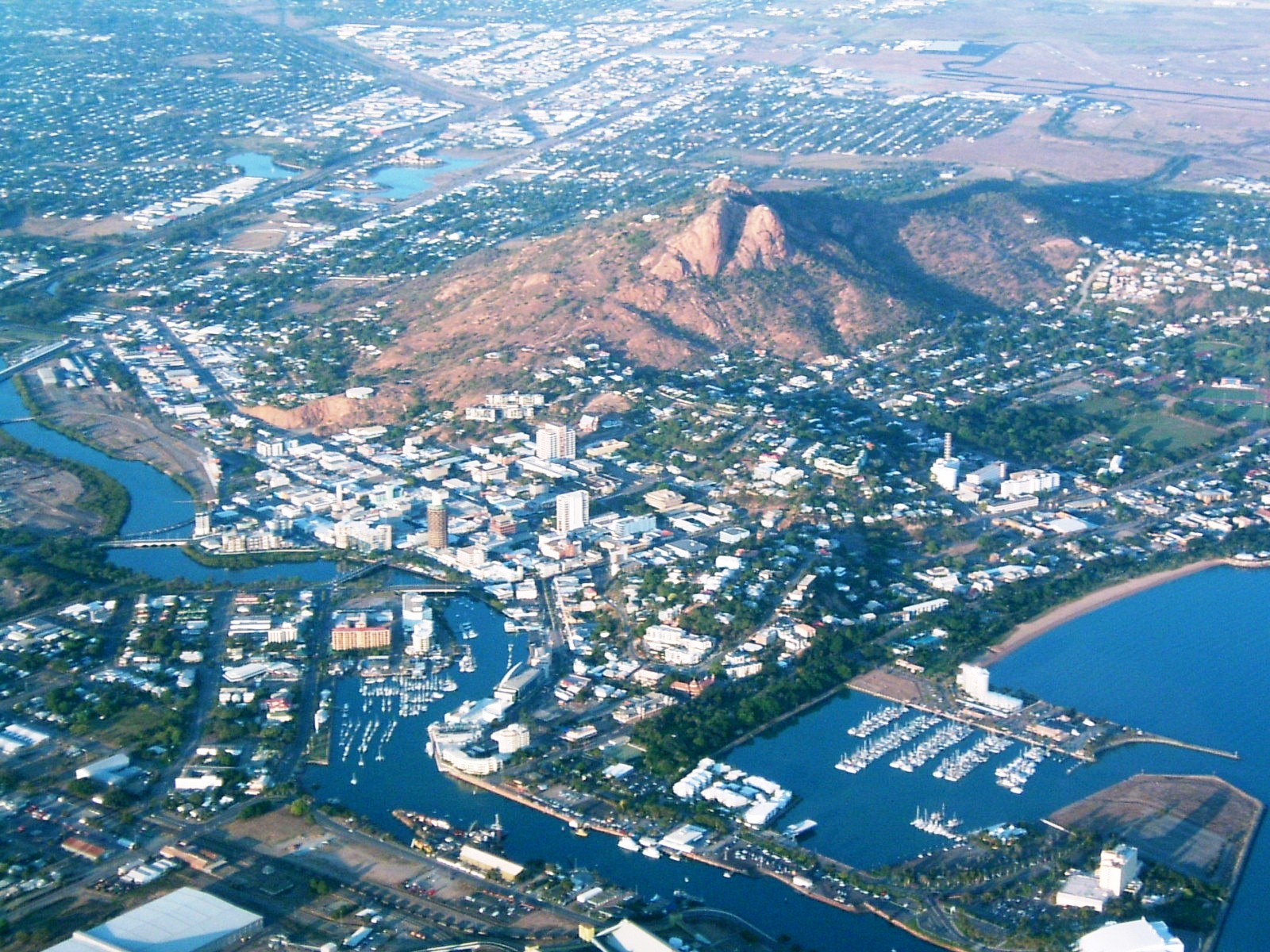
Monolithic Castle Hill dominates the Townsville coastline

Castle Hill is a heritage-listed isolated pink granite monolith in the suburb of Castle Hill, City of Townsville, Queensland, Australia. Its Indigenous name is Cootharinga, sometimes written as Cooderinga.

It rises to a height of some 286 metres (938 ft) above sea level and dominates the city skyline. It is one of the most distinctive natural features on the Queensland coast. There are a number of vantage points from which to view the city below and also across Cleveland Bay to nearby Magnetic Island. Castle Hill (as a hill) was listed on the Queensland Heritage Register in 1993.

== Geography and features ==
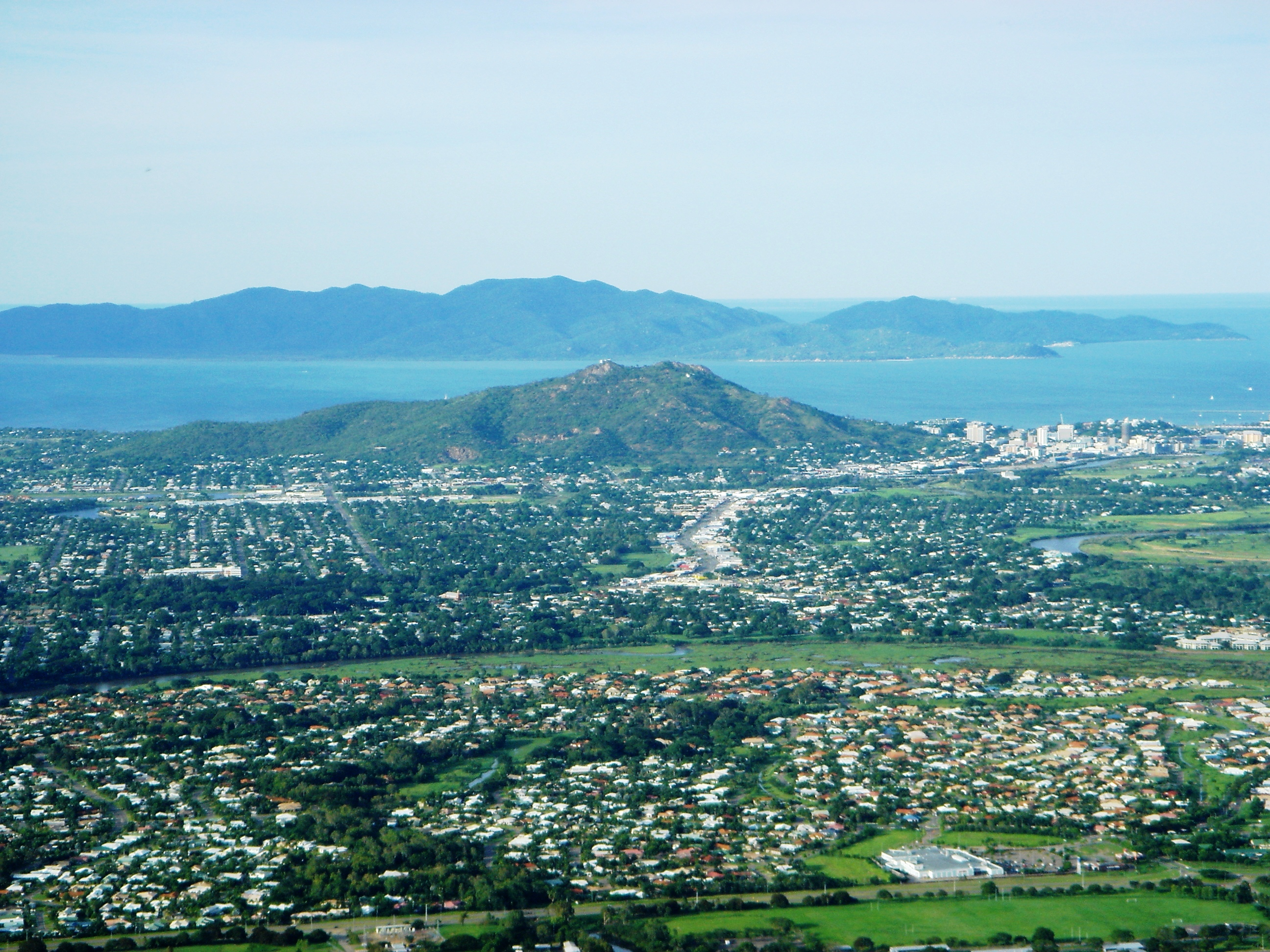
Castle Hill, Townsville (January 2008)

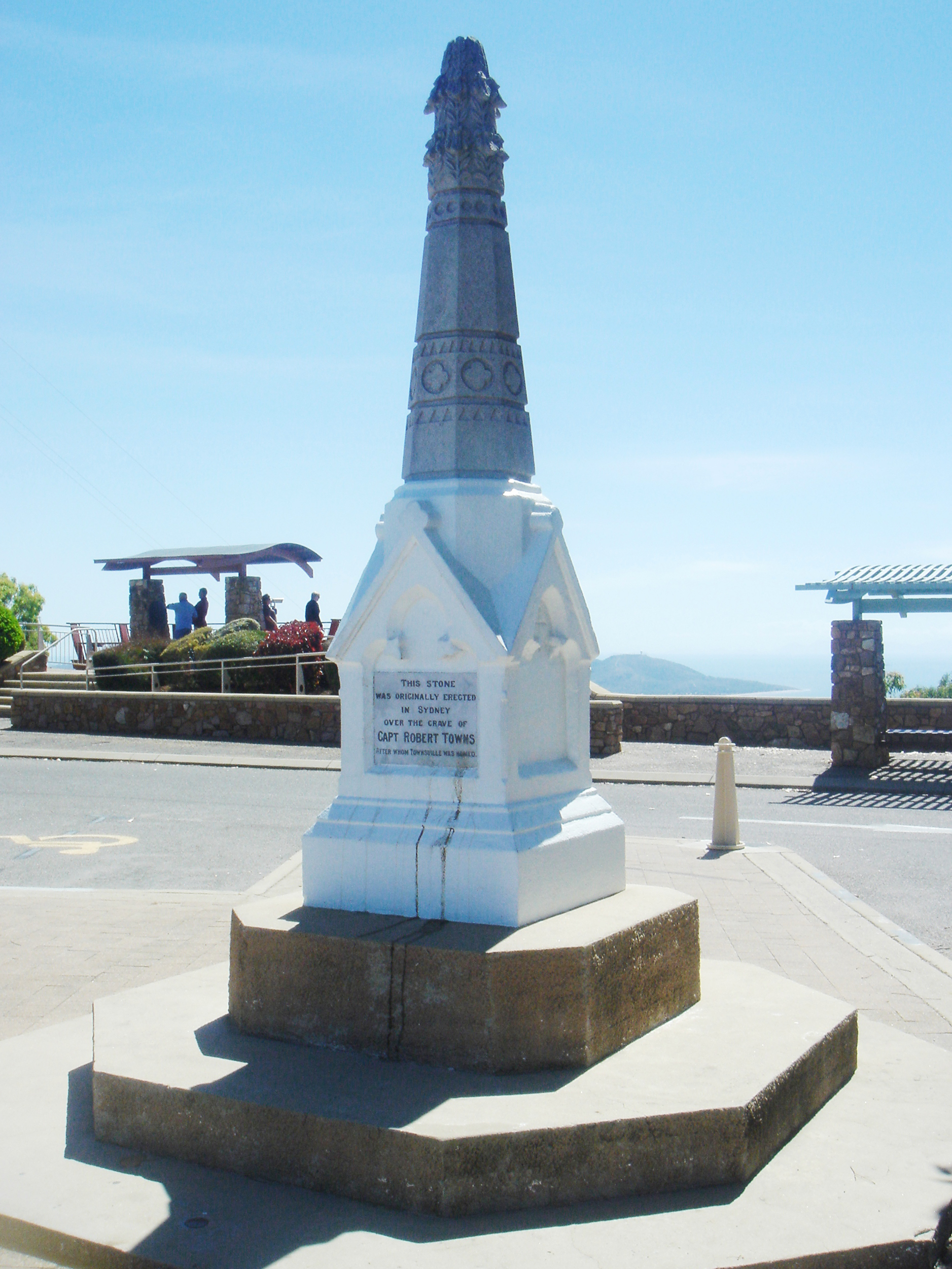
Robert Towns monument, relocated to Castle Hill, Townsville

The hill is an inselberg of Carboniferous–Permian origins, rising abruptly from the younger Quaternary coastal plain. The surface is primarily bare rock or shallow lithosols with small areas of duplex soils. There are three peaks to the summit. There is a former quarry site on the southern slopes, accessed via Stagpole Street, and on the northern cliff face a large graffiti of 'The Saint' is painted.

The bitumen "Castle Hill Road" winds for 2.6 kilometres (1.6 mi) from the northeast slopes to the summit of the second peak, on which the Hynes Lookout platform has been erected.

There are several buildings and installations on the hill. On the southern face was a two-storeyed octagonal building of concrete block work, which formerly housed the Panorama Restaurant, which has now been demolished. A carpark associated with the former restaurant is located nearby to the north. Other structures on the site include several water reservoirs and three radio communication installations. On the northernmost peak of the summit is a 1942 observation post, a low, square, concrete bunker with observation apertures.

=== Robert Towns monument ===
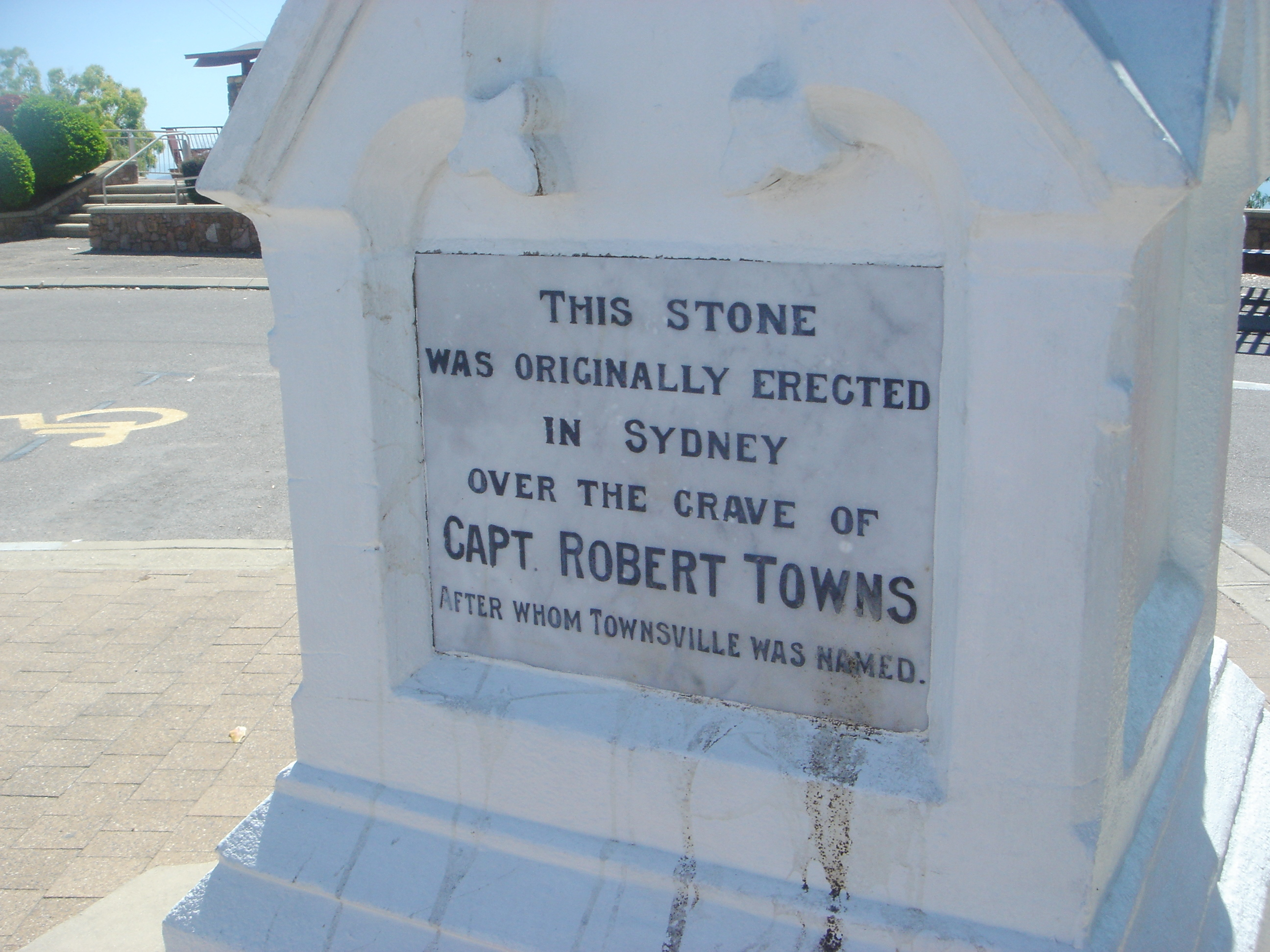
Plaque explaining the origins of the Robert Towns monument

In 1873, Robert Towns, the founder of Townsville, died in Sydney and was buried in Balmain Cemetery.

In 1940, the Municipality of Leichhardt decided to replace that cemetery with parkland (called Pioneers Memorial Park). The plans were advertised and families were invited to arrange for re-interment of bodies or removal of memorials. In 1941, the Leichhardt Council offered the memorial from the grave of Robert Towns to the Townsville City Council. In January 1942, Townsville City Council voted to accept the memorial and transport it to Townsville at a cost of £23/10/-. The decision to accept the monument was opposed by two councillors, one claiming that Robert Towns had done nothing for Townsville and it was only sheer good luck that caused the city to bear his name. A local resident, Tom Gleeson, proposed "high on the peak of Castle Hill, overlooking the harbour" would be a suitable location for the monument. Having arrived in Townsville, the monument was then placed in storage for a number of years.

It was not until October 1947 that the Council discussed where to place the monument. A number of locations were considered: Castle Hill, the Botanic Gardens, in front of the Queens Hotel, the Anzac Memorial Park and the Railway Oval, but Castle Hill was ultimately the council's choice. In February 1948, the Queensland Government gave its approval to the council to place the monument in the centre of the car parking area on the top of Castle Hill.

Over two years later, in November 1949, the monument was finally placed on Castle Hill, where it stands to the present day. A plaque was added to explain the origins of the monument.

== Flora ==
The vegetation, largely regenerative, is dominated by indigenous plant species. Approximately 300 plant species have been identified. Of particular importance are:

- Sarcochilus ceciliae (Orchidaceae), for which Castle Hill is the type locality, first described by renowned German-Australian botanist Ferdinand von Mueller in 1865;
- Aristida sp. nov. (Poaceae)
- Arthragrostis sp. nov. (Poaceae), both endemic to Castle Hill and currently being examined for description as new species; and Trodia stenostachya (Poaceae), a hummock grass community which represents an unusual coastal occurrence of this more typically inland spinifex.

The plant communities are predominantly mixed Eucalyptus spp. (E. drepaniphylla, E. dolichocarpa, E. tessellaris, E. Platyphylla, E. papuana) with variable woody understorey. Small areas of semi-evergreen notophyll vine thickets, not native to the site, occur in mesic areas such as gullies. On the gentler slopes kangaroo grass (Themeda triandra) is the dominant herbaceous species, while giant spear grass (Heteropogon triticeus) dominates on the steeper slopes. Specialised flora also occur on the cliffs and rocky outcrops, in particular the Triodia hummock grass community, Ficus spp. (five species) and orchids (two species). Introduced flora comprised almost 50 species, including Ficus benghalensis (Banyan).

== Fauna ==
The fauna, which has not been surveyed comprehensively, includes the unadorned rock-wallaby. The avifauna had been surveyed, with over 50 bird species either visiting or residing on the hill. Peregrine falcons and brahminy kites nest here. Echidna, death adder and quail have been seen.

== Activities ==
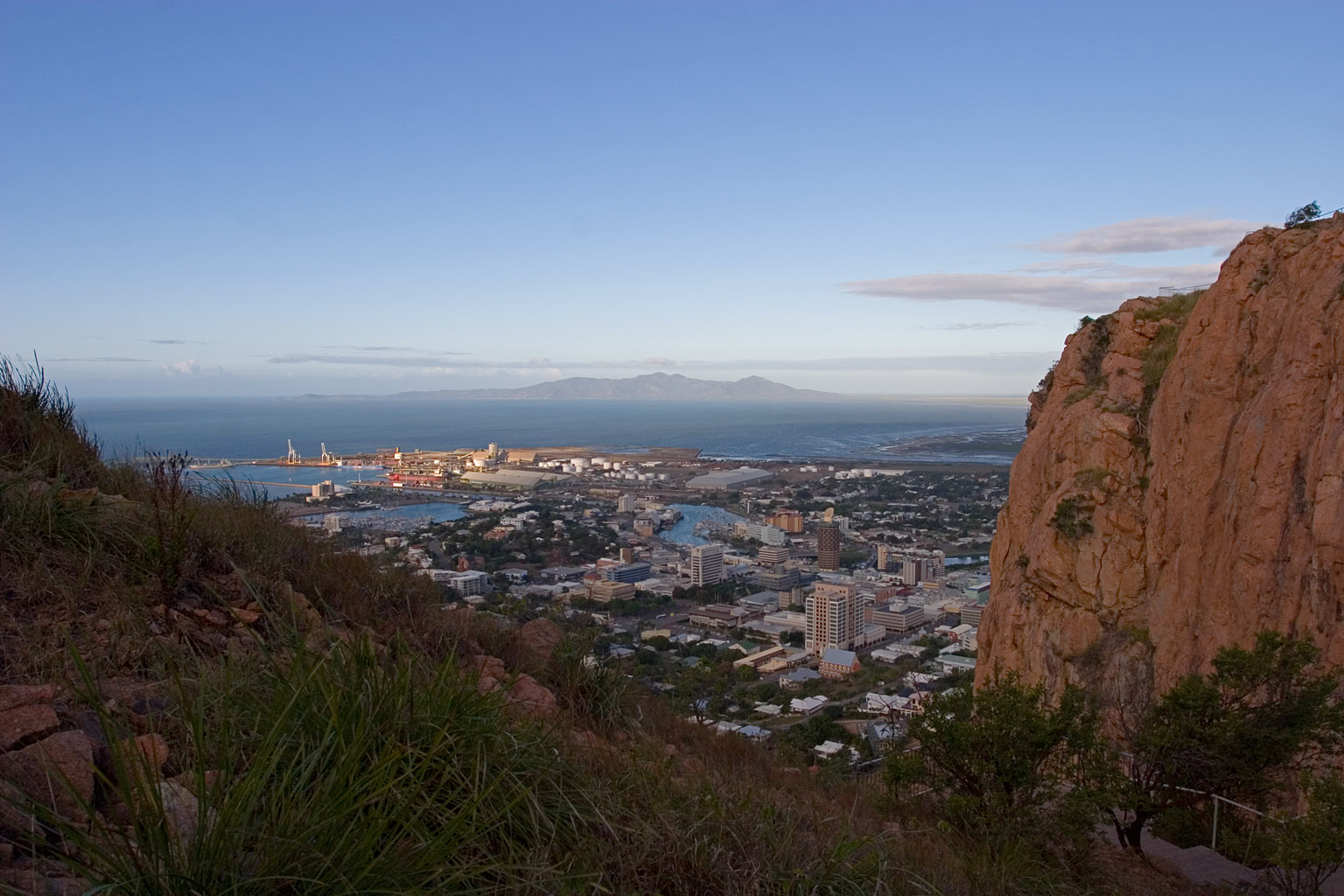
View from Castle Hill towards the Townsville Port

Many locals walk up Castle Hill for regular exercise. There are many different routes to the top, by road or by goat track. The Goat Track is a rough path that consists of 758 individual stairs from start to finish. Castle Hill is also a popular tourist site. Education groups regularly using the reserve to study natural environments, community history and urban geography. The North Queensland Conservation Council is undertaking a voluntary bush rejuvenation program of the site.

== History ==
=== Early records and creation of a Reserve ===
Castle Hill has formerly also been known locally as Cutheringa, Cudtheringa, Cootharinga, and Mt Cutheringa. The Aboriginal history associated with Cutheringa has not been recorded, but its name survives as one of only two known Australian Indigenous place names in the Townsville region, the other being Pallarenda.

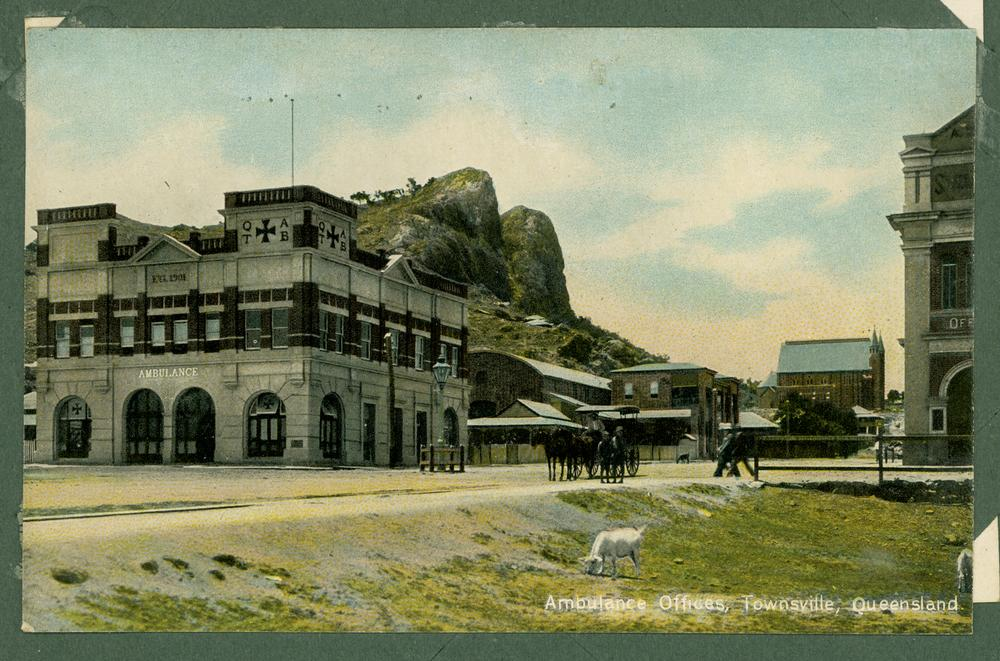
Ambulance building, corner Sturt and Stanley Streets, Townsville with Castle Hill in the background, ca. 1908.

Castle Hill was one of the earliest sites named by Andrew Ball who, together with MW Reid, were the first Europeans to explore the Ross River area in April 1864. The settlement established here was known initially as Castletown, until the name was replaced by Townsville in 1865.

Margaret Heuschele, in her 2000 publication In the Shadow of Castle Hill noted that:

Castle Hill was named by Andrew Ball in 1864. It is thought he named it either because he thought it resembled part of the Isle of Man or a hill near Dublin. The hill was also named Mount Cudtheringa by Lieutenant Heath during a survey of Cleveland Bay. This may have been on the suggestion of James Morrill who was with Lieutenant Heath at the time. Cudtherunga possibly means 'Possum Dreaming'.

The hill became a much admired local landmark, evoking aesthetic delight and a unique sense of identity. This prominent link between urban life and nature largely determined the disordered layout of Townsville's streets and in the late 19th century was frequented for recreational pursuits such as botanising and nature study. Townsville residents also illegally plundered timber and firewood from Castle Hill. Wild goats further ravaged the native vegetation. By the late 1880s, the Townsville Herald (1822–97) voiced considerable public outrage at the continued denudation of Castle Hill. These concerns were part of Queensland-wide debates on forest resource use and conservation.

In an innovative approach to conservation, the Townsville Municipal Council applied to the Crown to establish the Hill as a reserve under their protective trusteeship, and on 30 June, Castle Hill was gazetted a Recreation Reserve of 228 hectares (560 acres). However, despite the appointment of Crown Land Rangers and later, a Conservator of Trees for Castle Hill, the council was able to do little to restore the tree cover of the reserve during the depression years of the 1890s. Alderman Edward Downs and EJ Banfield privately planted various trees through the 1890s, including the surviving banyans, but by the 20th century, popular interest in preserving the natural vegetation of Castle Hill had waned. Small areas of the reserve were excised in the 1890s for water reserves and quarrying, but by 1900 it remained an unimproved reserve of close to 215 hectares (530 acres).

Only into the 1930s did the Council appear to directly address the Castle Hill environment. The goats were removed, permitting natural revegetation and in 1935–36 a road to the summit was constructed as an employment generating scheme, partly funded by the Main Roads Commission. Hynes Road (now Castle Hill Road) and Lookout were named after the then Minister for Labour and Industry, Hon. MP Maurice Hynes.

=== World War II ===
Ammunition magazine, situated below road up Castle Hill

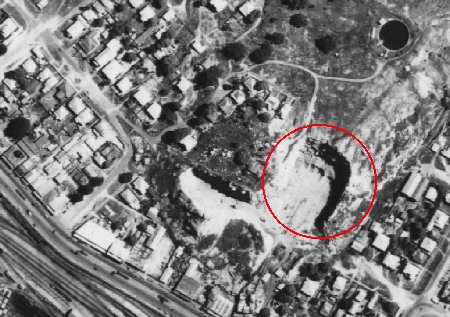
1952 photograph of the quarry near Sturt Street

During the Second World War Castle Hill was used as a communications and observation post. Infantry and field regiments of the 5th Australian Division were deployed on the hill, and the observation post they constructed remains. In 1942 a radar station was established on the summit, and searchlights extended halfway up the hill. The road up Castle Hill was closed to traffic on 12 March 1942 to enable the construction of the above-ground Green Street Bunker near Sidney Street, West End. Unconfirmed reports indicate approval was given for the construction of an underground Area Combined Headquarters in Castle Hill in 1943.

=== Development ===
Since the 1950s areas from within the recreation reserve, including the summit, were excised for a variety of purposes: further water reserves and quarrying, a restaurant, car parking, communications installations and residential subdivision. By 1972 the Recreation Reserve had been reduced to about 143 hectares (350 acres). Since 1974 radio communications installations erected at the summit have serviced the Civil Aviation Safety Authority, ambulance, fire brigade, police, state emergency services and customs.

In 1983 a further 33 hectares (82 acres) were granted to Yarrawonga Pty Ltd under special lease as a potential development site. The Yarrawonga subdivision is situated in the foothills of Castle Hill. With views of North Ward and Magnetic Island; it has been described as the most expensive real estate outside south-east Queensland and is noted for its elevation and large homes, precariously placed on the foothills.

There have been at least two attempts to raise the height of Castle Hill so that it would qualify as a mountain.

== Heritage listing ==
Entered on the Queensland Heritage Register 28 May 1993.

== See also ==
- North Eastern Area Command HQ, Townsville

== Sources ==
- Heuschele, Margaret (2000). In the Shadow of Castle Hill. Townsville: Townsville Library Service. ISBN 1-875830-41-3.
