= The Palmetum, Townsville =

Botanical garden in Queensland, Australia

Coordinates: 19.3120°S 146.7641°E

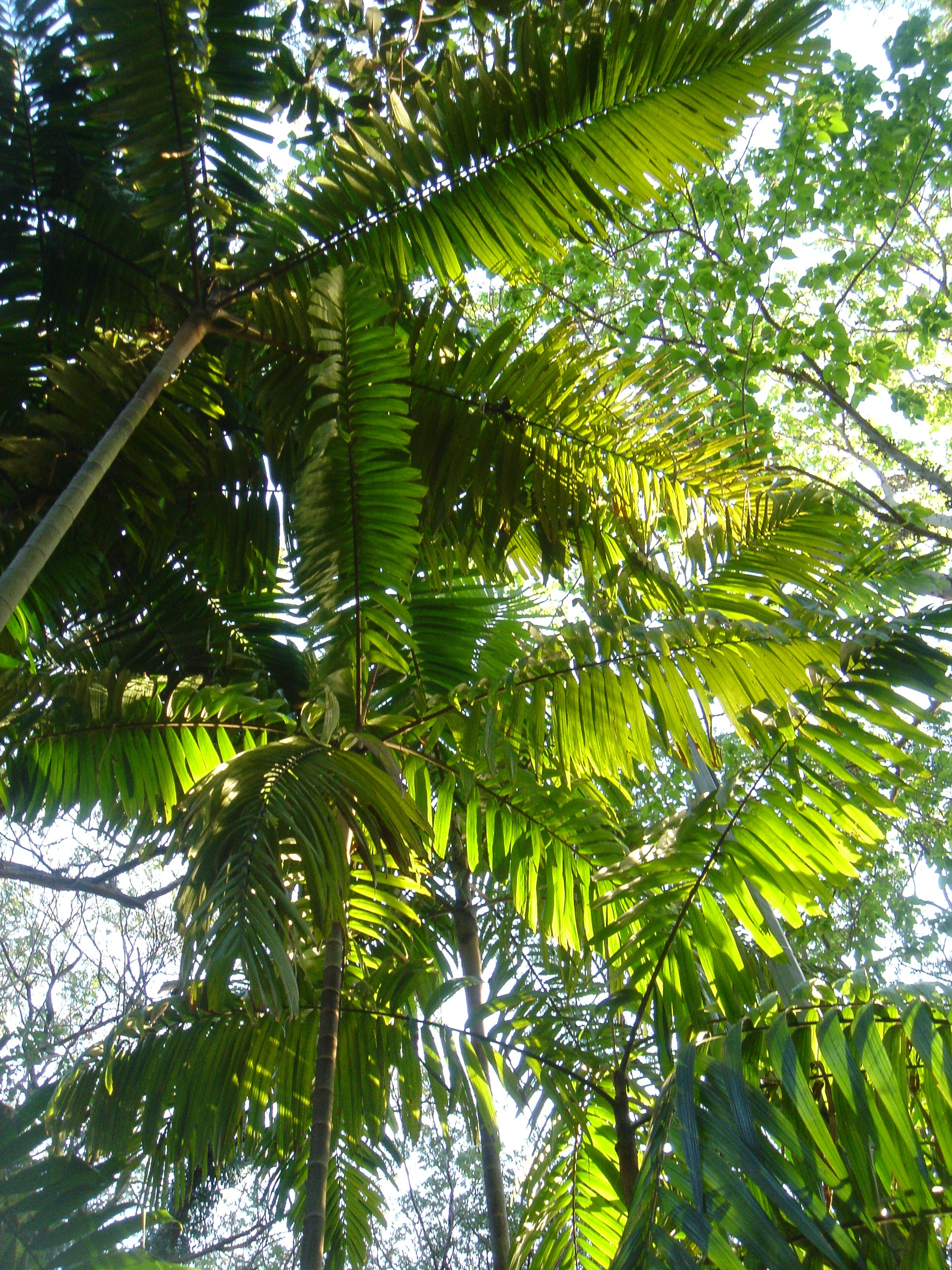
Canopy, The Palmetum

The Palmetum is one of three botanical gardens of Townsville, Queensland. The Palmetum is located in the suburb of Annandale, near the Ross River, James Cook University and the Townsville Hospital.

== Gardens ==
The Palmetum is a botanical garden featuring only one family of plants, the palm. The park covers almost 17 hectares. The garden's collection includes all six subfamilies within the family Arecaceae, with a total of about 300 species represented. Many are considered rare and threatened in their natural habitat. Around 50% of these species are naturally found in Australia which makes the plantarium a diverse experience. 60% of the plants currently in the palmetum are labelled. A boardwalk within the park follows the wetland path and also around the small inlet from Ross River.

== History ==
The Palmetum was officially opened in September 1988 as a Bicentennial project. Townsville's Japanese sister city Tokuyama funded the initial development of the Licuala Walk and Tokuyama Garden, which was completed in 1996. The Blackhawk Memorial was completed in 1997, dedicated to the 18 soldiers who lost their lives in a training exercise accident at the High Range Training Area.

== Gallery ==
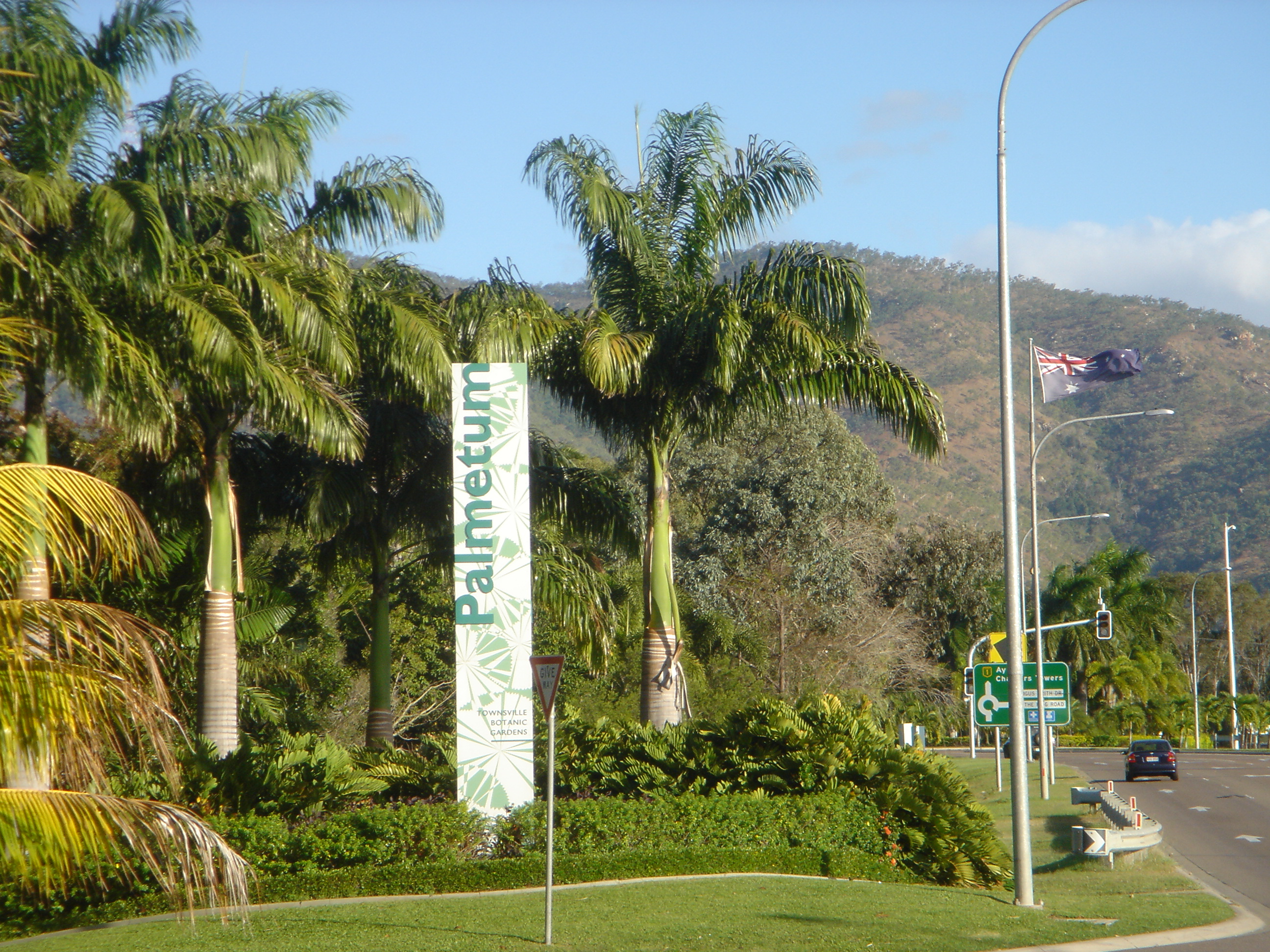
Palmetum entrance from Nathan Street

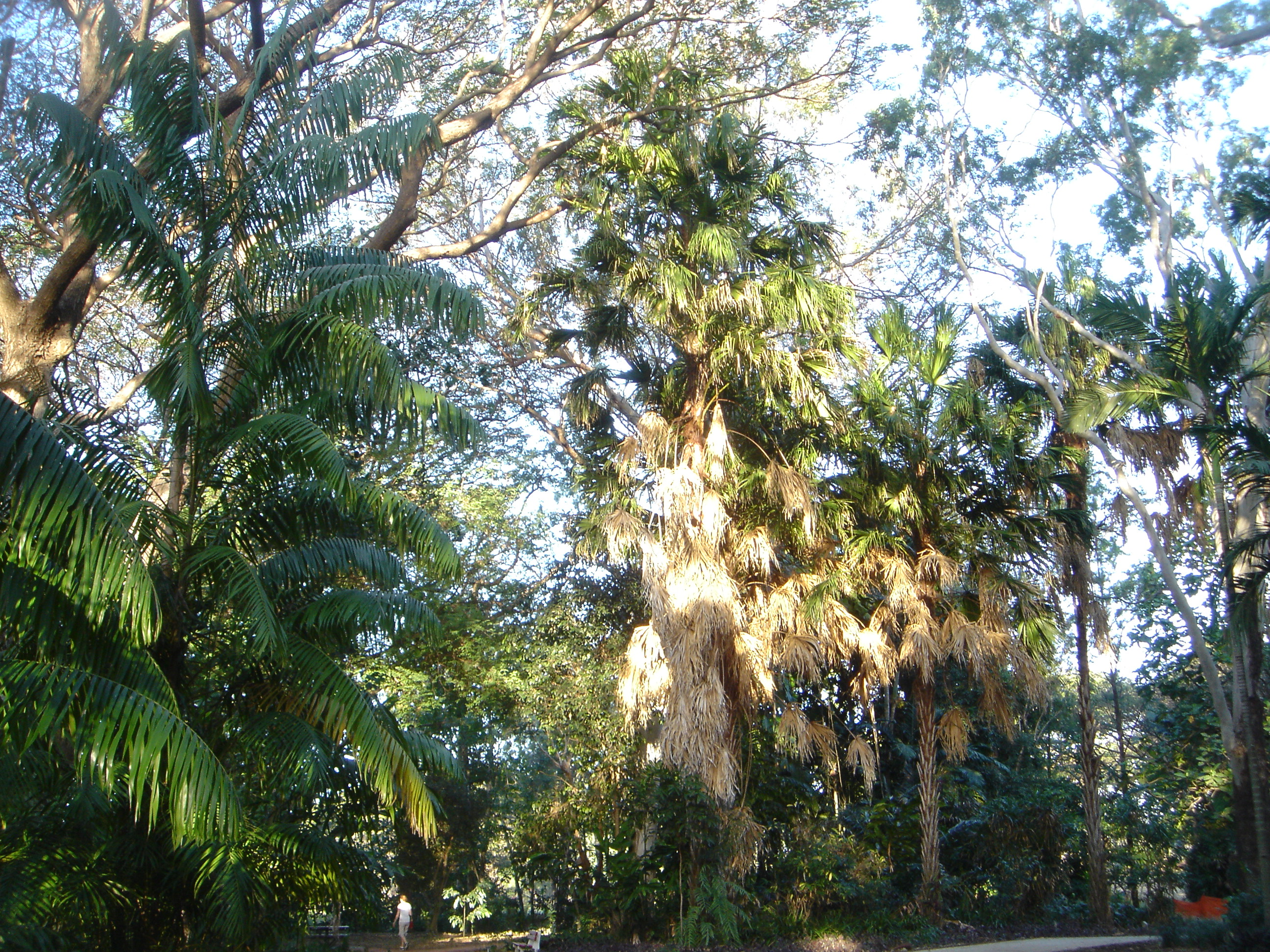
Livistona saribus; note comparative height of woman, bottom left.

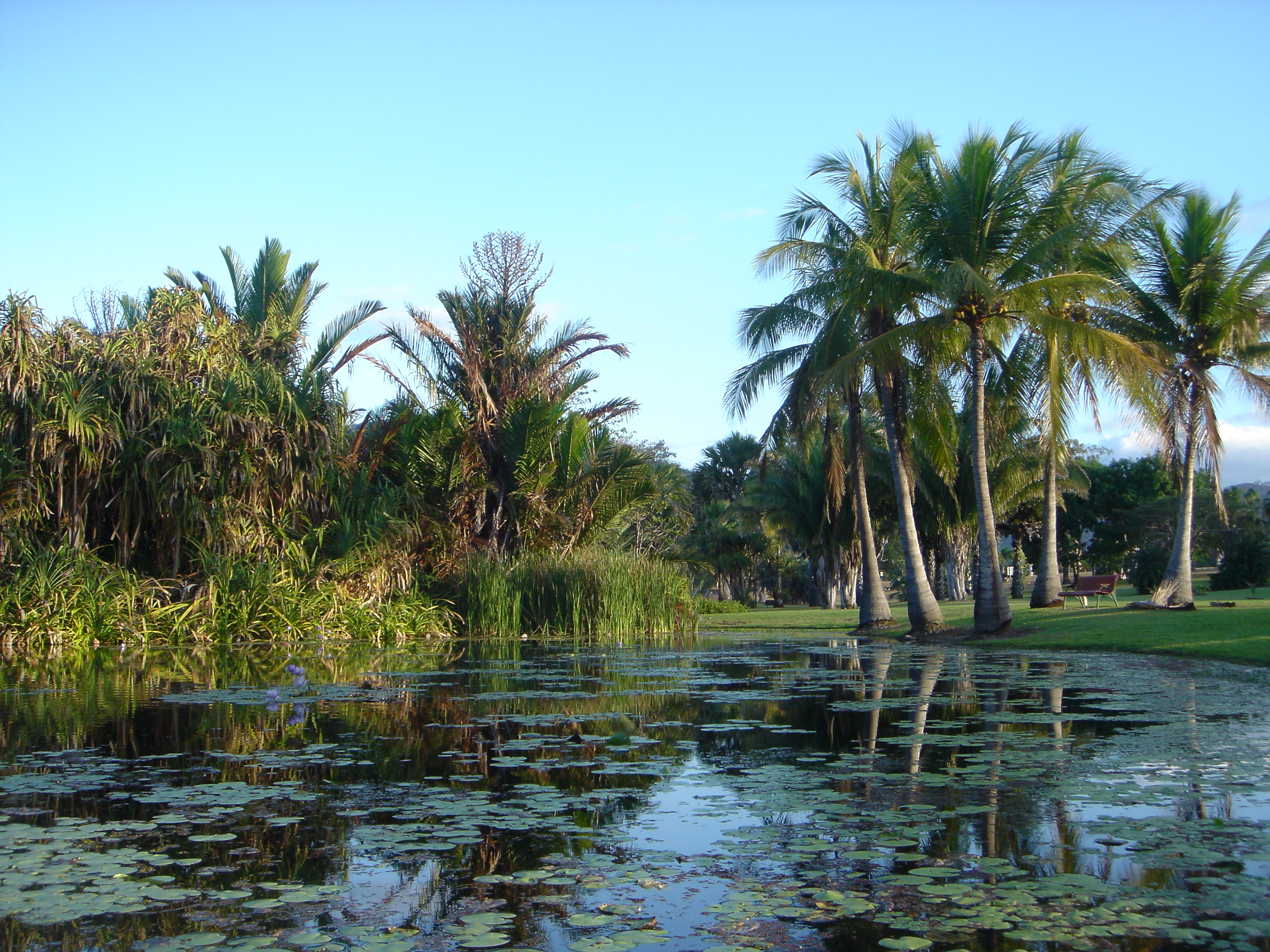
Lagoon area, Townsville Palmetum

== See also ==
There are two other botanical gardens in Townsville:

- Anderson Park, Townsville
- Queens Gardens, Townsville
