= Castle Hill, Queensland =

Castle Hill
- Suburb
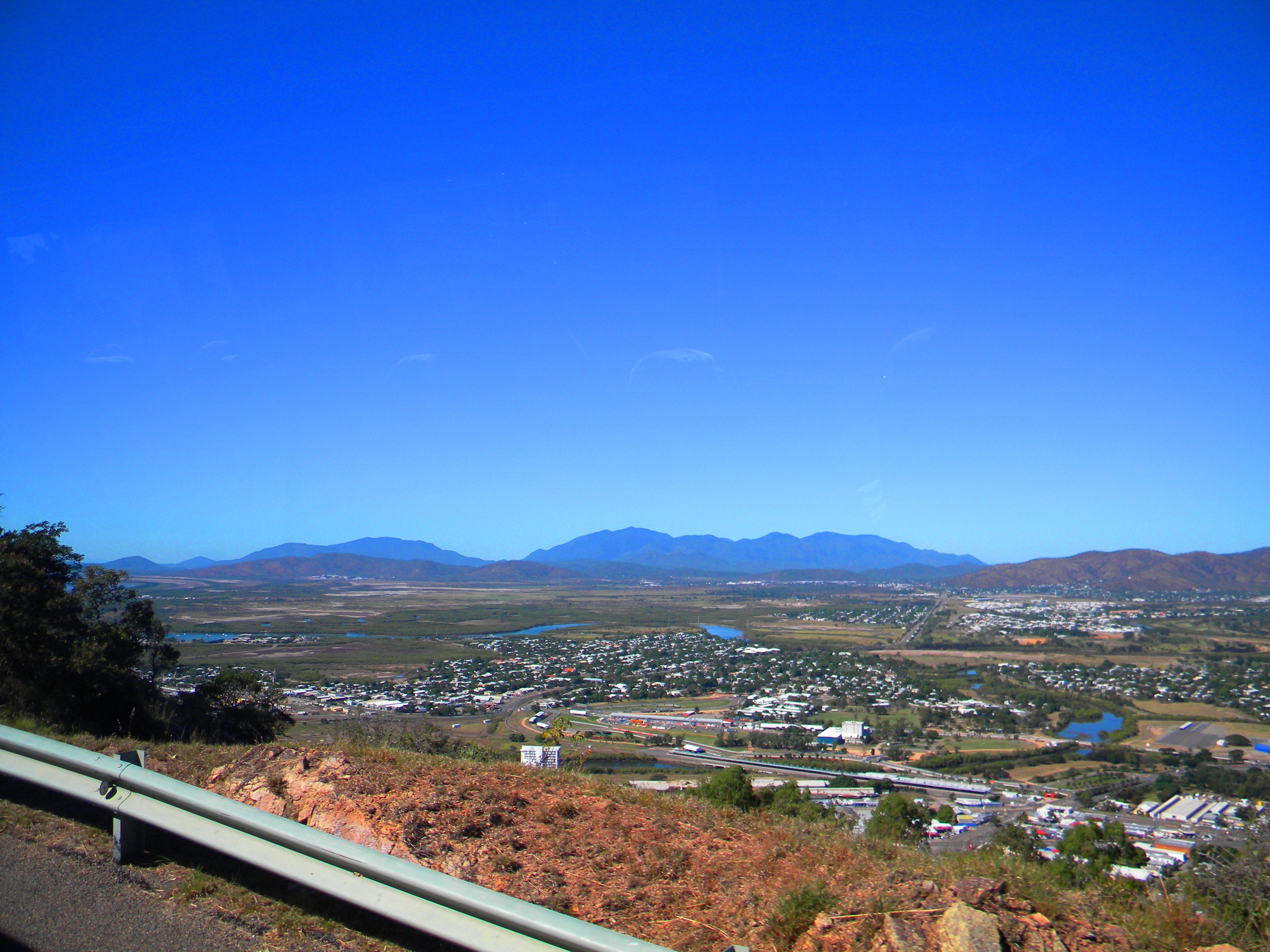
- View from Castle Hill

- Interactive map of Castle Hill
- Coordinates: 19.2558°S 146.7977°E
- Country: Australia
- State: Queensland
- City: Townsville
- LGA: City of Townsville
- Location: 3.7 km (2.3 mi) W of Townsville CBD; 1,360 km (850 mi) NNW of Brisbane

Government
  - State electorate: Townsville
  - Federal division: Herbert

Area
  - Total: 2.3 km^{2} (0.89 sq mi)

Population
  - Total: 972 (2021 census)
  - Density: 423/km^{2} (1,095/sq mi)
- Time zone: UTC+10:00 (AEST)
- Postcode: 4810
Suburbs around Castle Hill
| Belgian Gardens | Belgian Gardens | North Ward |
| West End | Castle Hill | North Ward |
| West End | West End | Townsville City |

Castle Hill is a suburb of Townsville in the City of Townsville, Queensland, Australia. The suburb is based on and around the mountain of the same name. The Indigenous name for the mountain is Cootharinga, sometimes written as Cooderinga. In the 2021 census, Castle Hill had a population of 972 people.

== Geography ==
Most of the suburb is taken up with the Castle Hill Reserve with only a small area in the north of the suburb being available for housing. The residential estate is commonly known as Yarrawonga.

== History ==
Castle Hill is situated in the traditional Wulgurukaba Aboriginal country. The origin of the suburb name is taken from the geographical feature Castle Hill, thought to be named by an early pastoralist Andrew Ball. The Aboriginal name Cudtheringa was recorded by Lieutenant George Poynter Heath, on advice from castaway James Morrill during a survey of Cleveland Bay in 1864.

== Demographics ==
In the 2011 census, Castle Hill had a population of 1,009 people.

In the 2016 census, Castle Hill had a population of 941 people.

In the 2021 census, Castle Hill had a population of 972 people.

== Heritage listings ==
The Castle Hill reserve is listed on the Queensland Heritage Register.

== Education ==
There are no schools in Castle Hill. The nearest government primary schools are Townsville Central State School in neighbouring North Ward to the north-east and Belgian Gardens State School in neighbouring Belgian Gardens to the north-west. The nearest government secondary school is Townsville State High School in Railway Estate to the south-west. There are also a number of non-government schools in the surrounding suburbs.

== Attractions ==
Castle Hill Lookout is at the top of the hill on Castle Hill Road (19.2586°S 146.8024°E). There is an obelisk at the top commemorating Robert Towns as the founder of Townsville. It had originally stood on his grave in Balmain Cemetery in Sydney until that cemetery was closed and converted to parkland in 1941 and arrangements had to be made to remove any memorials. As a result, the memorial stone from Robert Towns' grave was relocated to Castle Hill.
