= Townsville Central State School =

State school in Australia

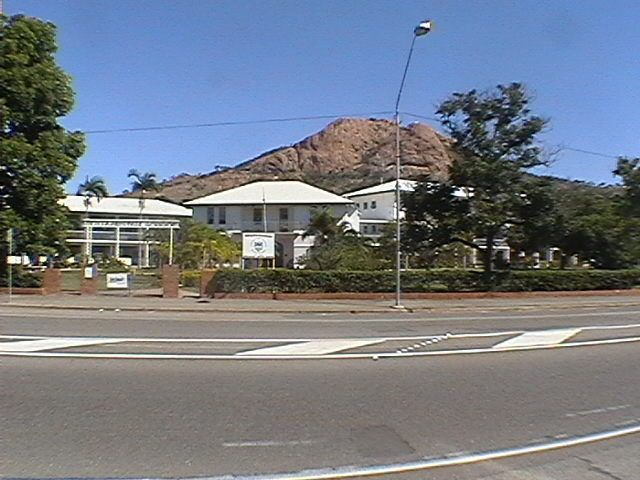
- Townsville Central State School

- Location within Queensland Location within Australia
- 19.2517°S 146.8113°E
- Location: 4–6 Warburton Street, North Ward, City of Townsville, Queensland, Australia

History
- Design period: 1870s–1890s (late 19th century)
- Built: 1877–1880

Site notes
- Architect: Francis Drummond Greville Stanley
- Architectural style: Classicism

Queensland Heritage Register
- Official name: Townsville Central State School, Former Townsville Gaol & Residence Police Inspector
- Type: state heritage (archaeological, landscape, built)
- Designated: 1 October 2003
- Reference no.: 601162
- Significant period: 1870s–1890s (historical gaol); 1950s (historical school); 1870s–1890s (fabric); 1950s–ongoing (socia
- Significant components: office/administration building, garden/grounds, other – law/order, immigration, customs, quarantine: component
- Builders: J Rooney

Townsville Central State School is a heritage-listed state school and former prison at 4–6 Warburton Street, North Ward, City of Townsville, Queensland, Australia. It was designed by Francis Drummond Greville Stanley and built from 1877 to 1880 by J Rooney. It is also known as the former Townsville Gaol and Residence of the Police Inspector. It was added to the Queensland Heritage Register on 1 October 2003.

== History ==
The Townsville Central State School, first established as the National School in 1869, was relocated to its present site in Warburton Street in 1955 and incorporates the remains of the first Townsville gaol which was established in 1878 and relocated to Stuart Creek in 1891 (where it is now known as the Townsville Correctional Centre).

=== The Gaol ===
Townsville was proclaimed a municipality in 1865 with a population of approximately 100. By 1870, Townsville had become a major port in North Queensland with permanent infrastructure to support the needs of increasing population. The discovery of gold in Charters Towers and Ravenshoe contributed to the steady growth of Townsville, and with increased activity in the goldfields, criminal activity such as drunkenness, violence and vagrancy also escalated exceeding the capacity of the small timber police lock-up.

Plans for a new gaol were prepared by the renowned colonial architect, FDG Stanley who designed several other buildings in Townsville, including the Queensland National Bank in Flinders Street, the first Post Office, the Magistrates Court, the 1879 Telegraph Office and the Hospital.

According to a report written by Stanley for the Under Secretary of Public Works on 8 May 1875:

"The object in view has been to provide a complete establishment which would be sufficient for the gaol requirements of the North, for say the next ten or twelve years without material alteration. And on its design and planning: The general arrangement of the Plan adopted is that of the radiating principle as this great facility is afforded under this system for the economical working of the whole establishment."

The accommodation of the gaol when completed was:

- One prison ward for 140 male prisoners, forty in single cells per entire block
- Prison ward for 60 female prisoners. Twenty per block.
- Prisoners' Kitchen with store attached
- Quarters for gaoler with offices
- Quarters for Turnkeys placed on each side of entrance court and having check gate at the inner side.
- Underground water tanks with sufficient supply for full complement of prisoners.

The prison wards buildings were designed in blocks, two storeys in height, because it was cheaper than one storey buildings and occupied less ground area within the boundary wall, so leaving more yard space for exercise and work sheds. The gaol was surrounded by brick boundary wall 16 feet (4.9 m) in height; and the yards in which the prison wards stood were divided from each other by brick walls 10 feet (3.0 m) in height; and from the outer boundary wall by a strong open stockade fence. Between this fence and the wall, a roadway 20 feet (6.1 m) wide provided additional security and provided a space which could be used as a means of inspection over yards, for drays, and for cleaning earth closets.

Tenders were called for the erection of a new gaol at Townsville in 1875 and the successful tenderer was contractor, J Rooney who was a major timber miller, builder and furniture maker in Queensland from the late 1860s-1938.These buildings were designed in blocks, two storeys in height, as being in the first place more economical in cost than one storey buildings and secondly as occupying less ground area within the boundary wall, so leaving more yard space for exercise, work sheds etc.

In May 1877, Stanley laid out the site for one of North Queensland's first gaols on part of the Botanical Gardens site occupied by the cricket club at the foot of Castle Hill. The walls and cells were completed for occupation by October 1878 and fully completed to include the gate house and gaoler's house in 1880.

The gaol became overcrowded almost as soon as it was completed. In 1891, a new gaol at Stuart's Creek was erected and all male prisoners transferred. Females were transferred in 1896. In 1896 the old gaol was reallocated to the Police Department and underwent many alterations until 1955 when the Central State School was relocated to the site.

=== Townsville Central State School ===
In March 1869, four years after the settlement of Townsville, the first recognized school, the National School, was opened in a building that had been used as the Burdekin and Flinders Hospital on The Strand. The school began with 48 students with an average attendance for the year of 53. The school expanded in 1873 to include a girls' school for which a new building was erected in 1874 and an infant school was established in 1876 with its new building erected in 1879. In 1878 over 200 girls were attending the school.

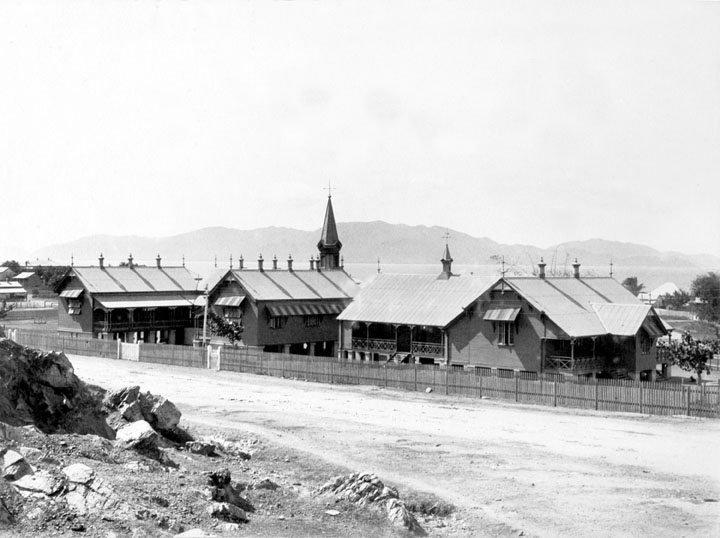
The old Townsville Central State School, circa 1890

A new boys' school was erected in 1889 and the two schools became known as the Townsville Central Schools. The school buildings suffered cyclone damage in 1896 and 1903 and a long history of the school not being adequately maintained is recorded in school records.

In 1930 amalgamation of the two Central schools was investigated and was considered to be straightforward due to their close proximity. At the time the enrolments stood at 214 boys and 316 girls. The Education Department refused the request then, but granted it in 1936. The two schools were closed and reopened four days later as the amalgamated Townsville Central State School on 30 June. A request for a new brick boys school was made in 1938 after the original boys school was condemned by the Works Department and approval was granted in 1940 for the construction of a new school to replace the existing Boys and Girls Schools.

The works were delayed, but following the Second World War, the Works Department was confronted with a need to accommodate an expanding student population caused by the post-war baby boom. Unlike the more formal and symmetrical plans of previous periods, plans were developed which tended to be asymmetrical and more open with interest developing in schemes which related to natural contours and existing vegetation. At Townsville Central State School, existing buildings and a strong planning arrangement were also taken into account.

Work on the new school commenced in 1954 and the school was occupied from 1955. The buildings were considered to be very attractive with ideal lighting and ventilation and the school was to become the "show" school for the region. Of the former gaol buildings, only the old gaoler's and turnkey's quarters remained intact. An extensive program of grounds improvements was commenced the following year.

In 1957 the remaining gaol boundary wall was shortened with walkways cut into it for easier access. The women's cells were demolished at this time leaving only the ground floor slab. The administrative office, formerly the old gaoler's and turnkey's quarters and then the office of the Superintendent of the Townsville Police District was renovated. A head teacher's office, deputy head teacher's office, male staff room and typists office were accommodated on the ground floor with a female staff room, toilets and library accommodated on the first floor. A room upstairs was also allocated for when the speech teacher visited the school to conduct lessons. Works to the exterior included the removal of the roof vents, replacing of double-hung sashes, the addition of a balcony to the eastern elevation and brick flower boxes, to either side of the entrance.

The school population continued to increase and additional classrooms were constructed in 1960. Lawns were developed along the entire frontage of the school and numerous trees were planted in accordance with a plan prepared by the curator of the Botanical Gardens adjacent.

The new library was opened in 1978 and the school residence was removed in 1981 from the site adjacent facing Gregory Street where residential units are now located. The adventure playground was established in 1993 with funds raised by the Parents & Citizens Association.

== Description ==
The school is located on Warburton Street at North Ward on a 3.405 ha flat site facing east at the foot of Castle Hill. The brick fence with iron balustrade to Warburton street is covered by a hedge and lined with mature shade trees. The gardens contain a variety of equipment, mature and ornamental trees, garden beds and seating areas. The site is bound to the south by a residential unit development on Gregory Street. A car park with entrance from Gregory Street, to the Dental Clinic adjacent to the west side of the quadrangle wall is fenced off from the school and sit adjacent to the hospital reserve. The Botanical Gardens form the western boundary and a day care centre and a preschool are located along the northern boundary to Kennedy Street.

'C' Block is located on the site of the former men's cell block, "B" Block is positioned parallel to "C" block but on the opposite side of "A" Block. Both buildings are connected at first floor level to "A" block by means of a covered suspended concrete walkway. "D" Block has been designed to follow the curve of the old prison wall and the library, whilst rectangular in plan is located similarly adjacent to the wall. A large proportion of the quadrangle is retained between these buildings and is used for assembly and other activities.

'A' Block is the former Gaoler's and Turnkey's quarters that was later adapted for the Police Superintendent's use before becoming the administration building for the school. It houses administrative functions on the ground floor and the staff room and some teaching facilities on the first floor.

It is a two storey rendered masonry building with a hipped corrugated iron roof. The building, of modest scale, has a symmetrical plan form with large entrance foyer which was once the check gate. Heavy masonry brackets provide support to the floor structure above. French doors, sidelights and fanlights have been fitted to the recessed basket arch openings at each end of this foyer. A projecting bay centred at the north houses a secondary exit and the stairwell. The exterior is articulated with horizontal brick bands at sill height, window head height to the ground floor and floor height to the first floor. Windows to the ground floor are round arched heads with double hung six light sashes and timber shutters, windows to the first floor have square heads and six light sashes. Ceilings are lined with fibrous cement sheeting and timber battens.

'B' Block and "C" Block are highset school buildings, not dissimilar in general design and planning to the prefabricated Boulton and Paul timber school building. Both buildings are constructed of brick with expressed horizontal mortar joints, gabled roofs of corrugated asbestos cement sheeting with concrete fin walls to support the verandahs.

Both buildings have classrooms with timber hopper windows from sill to ceiling to the long elevation facing west and with louvres fitted to the inside verandah wall to the east. "B" block contains one floor of classrooms and "C" block, a much larger scale building, has two floors of classrooms. The ground floor of each building houses toilet facilities with the remainder used for undercover play and lunch areas.

'D' block, constructed post 1976, is a single storey building of brick construction with a corrugated iron skillion roof. This classroom building has been constructed adjacent to the former gaol wall and its plan curves to match the radius of the wall.

The library, completed in 1980, is a single storey brick building with a skillion roof and rectangular plan form is located at the rear of the quadrangle adjacent to the former gaol wall.

The height of the curved former gaol varies around the site but has an average height of approximately 1,200 millimetres (47 in). East of "C" Block, a long portion of the concrete bases survives about 600 millimetres (24 in) high. Part of the wall was removed to accommodate "C" Block. The wall has been retained for the length of "D" block and is continuous to its southern end with the exception of two small openings for access to the dental clinic and play grounds The slab for the sentry tower is located at the opening adjacent to "D" block.

The concrete slab of the female cell block survives in the quadrangle with the outline of each of the cells clearly visible in the slab. White lines have been painted on the slab which is used as the handball court. Basketball courts and a pond are also located within the quadrangle. Outside the quadrangle are a rainforest, beach volleyball court, an adventure playground, preschool, tennis court, oval, cricket wicket, tractor shed and bush tucker garden.

== Heritage listing ==
Townsville Central State School was listed on the Queensland Heritage Register on 1 October 2003 having satisfied the following criteria.

The place is important in demonstrating the evolution or pattern of Queensland's history.

As the location of Townsville's first gaol constructed in 1878, Townsville Central State School provides important early evidence of the consolidation of Townsville as a government administrative centre in northern Queensland, and with the former Gaoler's and Turnkey's quarters and boundary wall, provides evidence of the early use of brick in Townsville. It is significant as an example of the work of colonial architect FDG Stanley and of the early work of the Townsville-based, north Queensland building firm, J & J Rooney.

The place has potential to yield information that will contribute to an understanding of Queensland's history.

It is also important for the evidence that survives of the gaol and the principles of its radiating design, and as an archaeological site, has the potential reveal information about the earlier functioning of the place as a gaol.

The place is important in demonstrating the principal characteristics of a particular class of cultural places.

It is also important in demonstrating the principal characteristics of a new form of tropical school architecture and planning.

The place is important because of its aesthetic significance.

Through the use of creative planning concepts including the incorporation of the surviving features of the former gaol into the school design, Townsville Central State School, together with its picturesque setting and mature shade trees at the foot of Castle Hill, demonstrates aesthetic attributes that contribute to the amenity of the school and to the townscape.

The place is important in demonstrating a high degree of creative or technical achievement at a particular period.

Through the use of creative planning concepts including the incorporation of the surviving features of the former gaol into the school design, Townsville Central State School, together with its picturesque setting and mature shade trees at the foot of Castle Hill, demonstrates aesthetic attributes that contribute to the amenity of the school and to the townscape.

The place has a strong or special association with a particular community or cultural group for social, cultural or spiritual reasons.

The Townsville Central State School is a "show" school valued by the community as an important part of their cultural heritage.
