= Anderson Park, Townsville =

Arboretum in Queensland, Australia

Anderson Botanic Gardens (Park)
- Interactive map of Anderson Botanic Gardens (Park)
- Type: Botanical
- Location: Townsville, Queensland
- Coordinates: 19.2914°S 146.7852°E
- Area: 27 hectares (67 acres)
- Opened: 1932
- Owner: Townsville City Council

Anderson Park is a 20 hectare arboretum in the suburb of Pimlico in Townsville, Queensland.

== The Gardens officially Anderson Botanic Gardens ==
It contains many fine examples of tropical trees in particular those of the dry tropics of the world and northern Queensland trees, Palms Arecaceae and one of the world's largest Pandan [Pandanus] collection.

=== The Plant Collection ===
- Pandanus – Includes most of the Australian pandanus species as well as others from New Guinea, South-East Asia, the western Pacific Islands and Madagascar.
- Cape York Section – This area features palms, gingers, Australian pandanus and ornamental trees from Far North Queensland focusing on those originating from the Cape York Peninsula.
- Palms – Highlights include the Bismarckia nobilis; Orbignya cohune, Hyphaene and Latania species.
- Conservatory – Open only by appointment. It houses a collection of tropical plants including bromeliads, gingers, aroids, nepenthes (Pitcher plants), palms and cycads.
- Tropical Fruit Orchard – Includes mango, citrus, lychee, black sapote, papaw, breadfruit, miracle fruit, dates, cashews, jackfruit, palm hearts, cinnamon, cloves, coffee, tea, turmeric and ginger.

== History ==
Part of the land was purchased in 1929 from the Water and Electricity Supply Department, although much of this is now taken up by the Mundingburra State School and the Townsville Jubilee Bowls Club. The Park was named in 1932 in appreciation of the work of William Anderson (1845–1935), City of Townsville's first Curator of Parks (1878–1934). In the same year the earliest recorded plantings occurred—these Raintree, Eucalyptus and Melaleuca trees now dominate the landscape. Further land was added in 1956 and 1963 through land acquisitions. The present design was prepared in 1962 by Alan Wilson, a Landscape Architect and Superintendent of Parks (1959–1969).

== See also ==
There are two other botanical gardens in Townsville:

- Queens Gardens, Townsville
- The Palmetum, Townsville
