= North Ward Defence Complex =

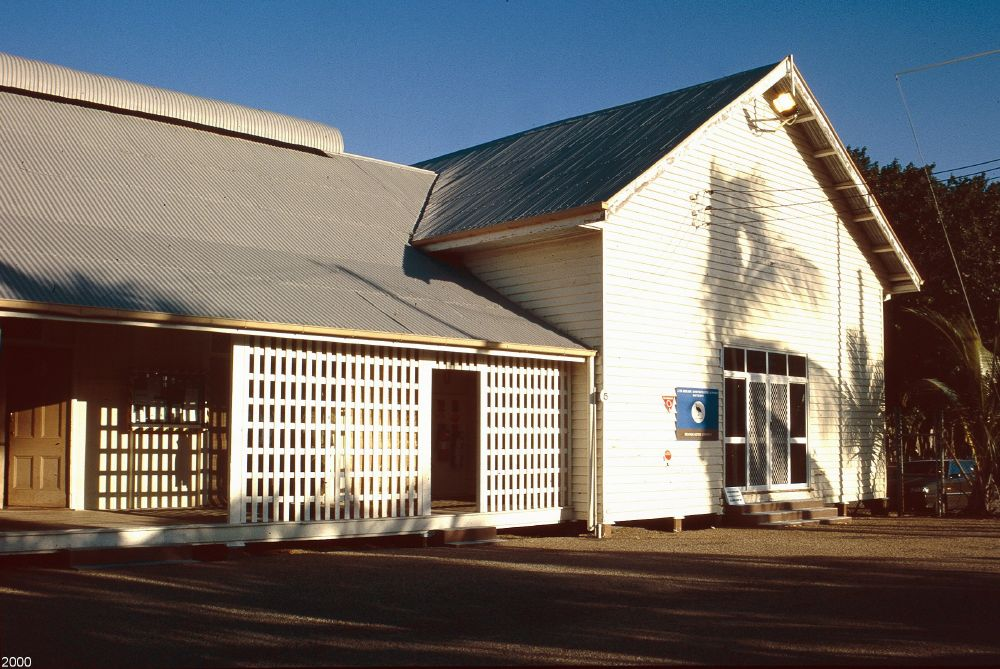
- North Ward Defence Complex, 2000

- Location within Queensland Location within Australia
- 19.2524°S 146.8161°E
- Location: 46 Oxley Street, North Ward, City of Townsville, Queensland, Australia

History
- Design period: 1870s–1890s (late 19th century)
- Built: 1885–c. 1942

Queensland Heritage Register
- Official name: Former North Ward Defence Complex, Townsville, 11 Brigade Administration Support Battalion Headquarters Company, Oxley Street Defence site
- Type: state heritage (built)
- Designated: 25 August 2006
- Reference no.: 602147
- Significant period: 1890–1942 (fabric); 1880s–c. 2000 (Historic)
- Significant components: office/administration building, hall – drill, residential accommodation – staff housing, store/s / storeroom / storehouse, garage

North Ward Defence Complex is a heritage-listed barracks at 46 Oxley Street, North Ward, City of Townsville, Queensland, Australia. It was built from 1885 to c. 1942. It is also known as 11 Brigade Administration Support Battalion Headquarters Company and Oxley Street Defence site. It was added to the Queensland Heritage Register on 25 August 2006.

== History ==
The North Ward Defence Complex, development of which began in 1885, was constructed as a Volunteer Defence Training facility. The majority of the present buildings on the site date from c. 1890 to c. 1942.

In the 1840s Britain gave its colonies a limited amount of self-rule. One of the reasons for the decision was the cost of maintaining government responsibilities in the far flung empire. While the British Government retained control of foreign relations and international trade and some aspects of defence, the colonies were given more responsibility for their own defence. Military property was transferred from the Imperial Board of Ordnance in London to local colonial control. England supplied and paid the troops and the colonies were responsible for other military needs.

It was not until the discovery of gold in the 1850s that the need for a strong military presence in Australia was seen to be necessary. Gold shipments required protection within the country and shipments at sea needed protection from privateers. Compounding these problems was the perceived threat of invasion during the buildup to the Crimean War. Because the Imperial British forces were likely to be directly engaged in the Crimea the Australian colonies began to develop volunteer forces for their own defence purposes. These volunteers supplied all their own needs except weapons and instruction.

During the second half of the 19th century international instability gave rise to concerns about military preparedness in the Australian colonies. Until 1878 Queensland's defences ended at Rockhampton. The rest of the coast was undefended until the formation of Townsville No.4 Battery and Garrison Artillery. The Townsville Battery was raised as a tactical response to the threat of seaborn attack, especially from privateers who might be interested in shipments of gold from the port of Townsville. Despite the establishment of No.4 Battery and Garrison Artillery there was still some concern in the Townsville community about the preparedness of the city for attack during the 1880s and early 1890s.

Efforts were made to improve Queensland's defence force, however these were unsatisfactory and volunteers continued to attend parades at their own expense. In a move to improve the situation the Queensland Government introduced the Defence Act 1884, which provided for permanent artillery and a partially paid militia.

The North Ward Defence Complex appears to have been developed as a response to the 1884 legislation. It appears that the first building, contracted for in 1885 and constructed c. 1887, was a drill hall. About 1890 a two-storeyed brick office and stores building was erected at the corner of Oxley and Mitchell Streets, and in a separate contract, Staff Officers' Quarters, Stables and Fencing were erected c. 1890. These early buildings were designed in the Queensland Colonial Architect's office.

In 1904 the Queensland Government Architect Alfred Barton Brady approved drawings prepared by District Architect Thomas Pye for a new drill hall and administrative offices. The drawings indicate that the existing Staff Quarters, Stores and Offices Building, Stables and small shed were to be retained, but that the original drill hall was to be removed. The new hall was completed in 1905–06.

In 1889 James Bevan Edwards, a senior regular British officer, visited Australia to advise the colonies on how to improve their military defences. His visit reflected both local and imperial concerns including moves towards Federation and hostile incursions into the Pacific Region. Edwards, basing his ideas on what was happening in Europe and England, advised the Australian colonies to amalgamate their permanent forces and to form a federal voluntary militia from their paid citizen soldiers.

Edwards' suggestions were considered at conferences attended by the colonial commanders in 1894 and 1896 but nothing was resolved. On 1 March 1901 the volunteer militia of the six colonies passed into the jurisdiction of the Australian Government under the administration of the Department of Defence without being formally amalgamated into one Australian army. The Australian Government had to decide whether to amalgamate the six colonial volunteer militia forces or to raise a new force. With the passing of the Defence Act 1903 the Commonwealth Government amalgamated the six colonial militia forces into a paid voluntary force which would defend Australian sovereignty both overseas and in Australia. Unpaid volunteers were confined to the defence of Australia.

The threat of war in Europe in 1914 saw members of the militia and the volunteer forces clamouring to join the Australian expeditionary force. In all, over 50,000 militia joined the Australian Infantry Force (AIF) during the First World War, signalling the demise of the volunteer force as the main military organisation in Australia.

The North Ward Defence Complex became a focus for cadet training after the First World War. Compulsory military training was instigated after the war for young men between the ages of eighteen and nineteen, who lived in cities and large towns. Responsibility for junior cadet training reverted to the states while senior cadet training no longer really existed beyond physical training and rifle practice.

The Cadet's Orderly Room had deteriorated by 1908 and in August the Commonwealth Inspector for Public Works, RN Quinn recommend that it be demolished and that the Sergeant's Room be partitioned to create space for the cadets. These works were carried out and the building has remained largely unchanged since.

In 1937 the Commonwealth Defence Department began negotiations to acquire the remainder of the town block bordered by Leichhardt and Oxley Streets on which the Defence buildings were located. Negotiations with the Queensland Government were protracted and it was not until 19 October 1939 that the purchase was finalised.

A plan of the site indicates that the galvanised iron clad, saw-tooth roofed Quartermaster's Store (Building No. 8), located on what was the newly purchased land, was constructed by 1942.

Other corrugated iron buildings on the site are likely to have been 19th century structures. Two timber framed, corrugated iron store buildings along Mitchell Street were demolished in August 2000, one of which appears to have been the c. 1890 stables. Some minor alterations were made to the Drill Hall in the 1970s and some alterations were made to the 1890 Offices and Stores Building when it was converted to the 11 Brigade dentist's surgery.

Concrete block toilets were constructed to the rear of the Drill Hall at the time women were allowed to join the armed forces in the late 20th century.

The complex is no longer owned by the Department of Defence.

== Description ==
The former North Ward Defence Complex is located on a town block bounded by Oxley, Leichhardt and Mitchell Streets and the Strand. The entrance to the complex is off Mitchell Street. Most of the buildings face into the complex, but the office section of the 1905–1906 Drill Hall faces Leichhardt Street. Vacant land at the front of the block faces the Strand.

At one stage there were 28 buildings and structures on the site. Only three buildings remain, each of which was identified as being of cultural heritage significance:

=== Former Offices and Stores Building (1890) ===
This building is constructed in English bond red brick. There is a gable in the roof over the gantry which is located over the large central opening at the first floor level. The opening has a modern glazed door in it. The building has timber double hung windows and a pair of original V-jointed board doors at ground floor level. One door on the ground floor has been covered over with sheet metal. Its rubbed brick arches - flat arches, distinguish the building over the window and single door openings, segmented arches over the large ground and first floor level openings. The building has a hipped corrugated iron roof with slatted boxed eaves to all elevations. The interior of the building, while possibly retaining some of its original form, has been converted into office space and extensively remodelled.

=== Administration Offices and Storeroom (former Drill Hall and Offices, 1905-06) ===
The offices and hall building is a timber-framed structure consisting of sections of both exposed timber studs to the exterior with vertical V-jointed board to the inside, and conventional weatherboard clad section. The exposed stud detail is located under the verandah only. The wing of the building, with its long elevation to Mitchell Street has a corrugated iron gabled roof with a semi-circular gabled vent while the longitudinal wing has a hipped corrugated galvanised iron roof with a vent to the south-east gabled end. The roof has areas of both open and slatted vented eaves. The structure sits on concrete stumps.

Doors are generally four panelled timber with pairs of doors with a highlight over to doors opening to the verandah. The windows are pivoted timber framed sashes, some of which appear to have been converted from double hung. The interior of the Mitchell Street wing has been relined but the other wing retains much of its original V-jointed lining boards.

It now serves as an art gallery, the Drill Hall Studio.

=== Offices (former Staff Quarters, c. 1890) ===
The administration building is a timber; six room former residential building with a pyramidal corrugated iron roof. The building is constructed on brick piers. Chamfer boards clad the external walls and verandah roof. The structure is exposed wooden stud framing to the verandah side with beaded lining boards facing the rooms. The building has an encircling verandah, which has been sheeted in with fibre cement sheet, timber trellis work and windows, and doors, which have been added at a relatively recent date. The verandah has a curved corrugated iron roof. The former service block at the rear of the building, which adjoins the south-west portion of the verandah, is a timber framed fibre cement sheet slatted timber structure with a corrugated iron skillion roof.

Internally, the rooms are generally uniform in detail with French doors with highlights over to the verandah to most rooms and four panel doors with highlights over to the passage. The doorways at either end of the passage have four panel doors with sidelights and highlights.

The former staff quarters was relocated on the site after the closure of the defence facility, now sitting between the former stores and drill hall and fronting onto Mitchell Street.

== Heritage listing ==
The former North Ward Defence Complex was listed on the Queensland Heritage Register on 25 August 2006 having satisfied the following criteria.

The place is important in demonstrating the evolution or pattern of Queensland's history.

The former North Ward Defence Complex, elements of which date from c. 1890 through to 1942, is important in illustrating the pattern of Queensland's history, being evidence of the Colonial response to changes in British military defence policy, the training of Queensland militia under both colonial and Federal administrations, and the continued occupation as a defence complex for over a century.

The place demonstrates rare, uncommon or endangered aspects of Queensland's cultural heritage.

The 1890 Former Offices and Stores Building and the 1905–06 former timber Drill Hall and Administrative Offices are rare surviving examples of their type and period of construction in Queensland. The drill hall in particular is one of only two Federation-era drill halls surviving in Queensland, the other being at Rockhampton. These buildings also are important in illustrating the principal characteristics of the work of the Queensland Government Architect's Office in the late 19th and early 20th centuries.

The place is important in demonstrating the principal characteristics of a particular class of cultural places.

As a mainly pre-1945 military complex, the North Ward Defence Complex is important in illustrating the principal characteristics of its type, including the composition and arrangement of buildings and structures, and is significant for its contribution to an understanding of the infrastructure required for the training of volunteer militia in Queensland prior to the Second World War.

The place is important because of its aesthetic significance.

The c. 1890 buildings and the 1905–06 Former Drill Hall and Administrative Offices have aesthetic value engendered by their form, fabric, detailing and scale. The two-storeyed, c. 1890 Former Brick Offices and Store has landmark value in the Mitchell Street streetscape.

The place has a special association with the life or work of a particular person, group or organisation of importance in Queensland's history.

The North Ward Defence Complex is significant for its long association with the Queensland Volunteer Defence Forces, and their important contribution to the defence of Queensland.
