= Belgian Gardens, Queensland =

Belgian Gardens
- Suburb
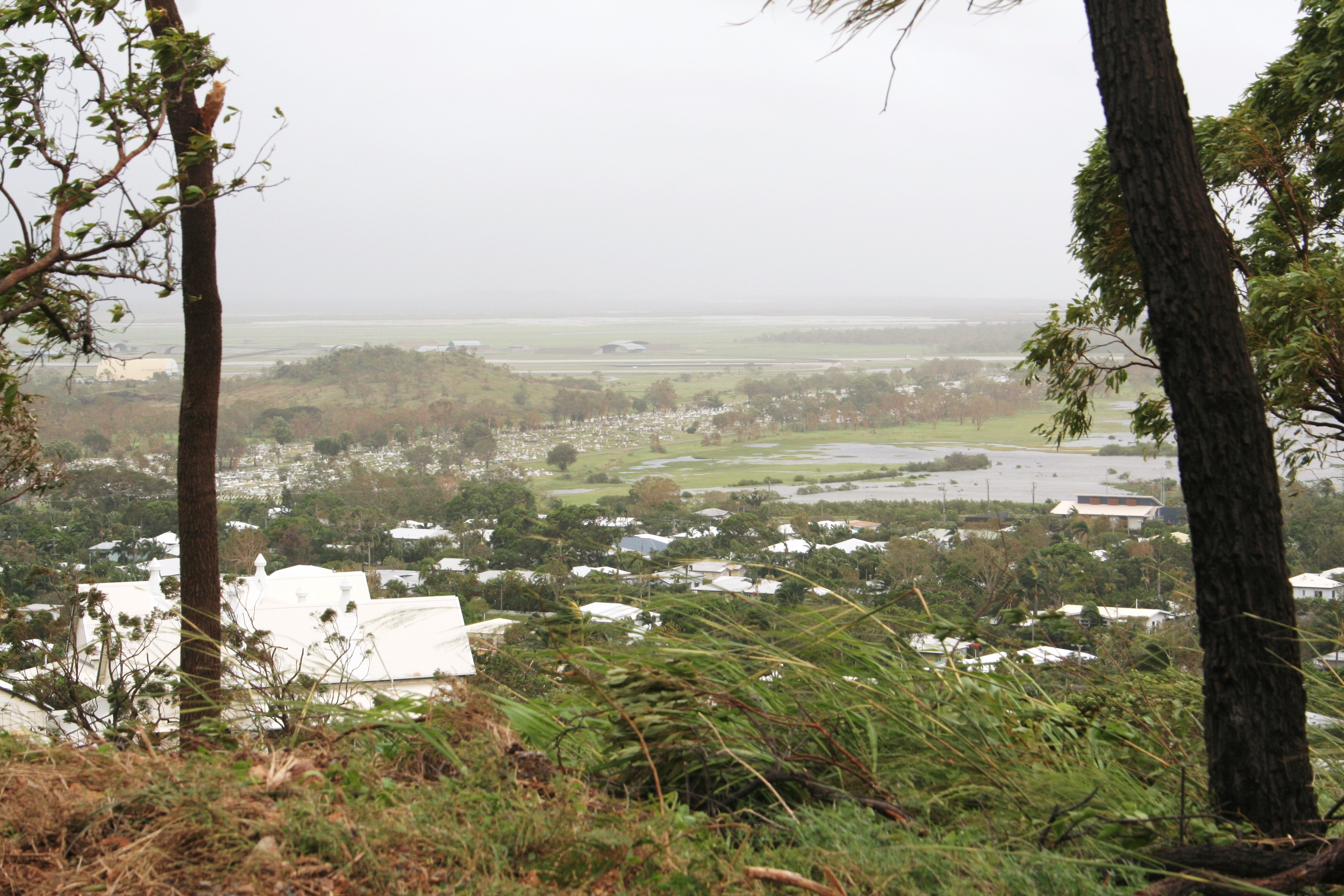
- Flooding in Belgian Gardens during Cyclone Yasi, 2011

- Interactive map of Belgian Gardens
- Coordinates: 19.2491°S 146.7919°E
- Country: Australia
- State: Queensland
- City: Townsville
- LGA: City of Townsville
- Location: 3.9 km (2.4 mi) WNW of Townsville CBD; 6.2 km (3.9 mi) NW of Railway Estate; 1,336 km (830 mi) NNW of Brisbane

Government
  - State electorate: Townsville
  - Federal division: Herbert

Area
  - Total: 1.1 km^{2} (0.42 sq mi)

Population
  - Total: 2,073 (2021 census)
  - Density: 1,880/km^{2} (4,880/sq mi)
- Time zone: UTC+10:00 (AEST)
- Postcode: 4810
Suburbs around Belgian Gardens
| Rowes Bay | Coral Sea | North Ward |
| Rowes Bay | Belgian Gardens | Castle Hill |
| Garbutt | West End | Castle Hill |

Belgian Gardens, formerly known as German Gardens, is an inner coastal suburb of Townsville in the City of Townsville, Queensland, Australia. In the 2021 census, Belgian Gardens had a population of 2,073 people.

== Geography ==
Belgian Gardens is located 5 kilometres (3.1 mi) from the central business district in Townsville. It is a suburban area and has restricted zoning laws to reduce the amount of corporate buildings and apartments.

Offshore to the north is a sandy beach along the edge of Rowes Bay (19.2373°S 146.7919°E), a part of the larger Cleveland Bay (19.2142°S 146.8998°E).

North Ward Road runs through from south to east.

== History ==
Before the advent of World War I, the suburb was named German Gardens after a vineyard owned in 1867 by German settler, Heinrich Fredrich Alfred Robinson. However, during the course of the war due to anti-German sentiment, the suburb was renamed to Belgian Gardens.

Townsville North State School was opened on 4 July 1887. On 20 June 1930, the school was renamed Belgian Gardens State School. During the influenza epidemic in 1919, schools were closed and Belgian Gardens school was converted into an isolation hospital with the army erecting tents in the grounds; 195 patients were hospitalised at the school with 6 deaths. In 1954, 246 students were enrolled.

Cleveland School opened on 15 July 1994 as a school within the Cleveland Youth Detention Centre. On 9 February 2006 it was renamed Cleveland Education and Training Centre.

== Demographics ==
In the 2011 census, Belgian Gardens had a population of 1,935 people.

In the 2016 census, Belgian Gardens had a population of 2,069 people.

In the 2021 census, Belgian Gardens had a population of 2,073 people.

== Heritage listings ==
Belgian Gardens has a number of heritage-listed sites, including:

- 13 St James Drive: Bishop's Lodge

== Education ==
Belgian Gardens State School is a government primary (Prep–6) school for boys and girls at 43 Potts Street (19.2507°S 146.7928°E). In 2018, the school had an enrolment of 587 students with 47 teachers (41 full-time equivalent) and 24 non-teaching staff (16 full-time equivalent). It includes a special education program.

Townsville Police Academy is at 26 Heatleys Parade (19.24356°S 146.7930°E).

There are no secondary schools in Belgian Gardens. The nearest government secondary school is Townsville State High School in Railway Estate to the south-east.

== Facilities ==
The Belgian Gardens Cemetery was once in the suburb but boundary changes means the cemetery is now in the neighbouring suburb of Rowes Bay.

== See also ==
- Australian place names changed from German names
