= Daily Northern Standard =

Australian newspaper

The Daily Northern Standard was an evening newspaper published in Townsville, Queensland, Australia.

== History ==
The first issue was published on 1 October 1883. It ceased publication on 14 April 1887.
