= North Ward, Queensland =

North Ward
- Suburb
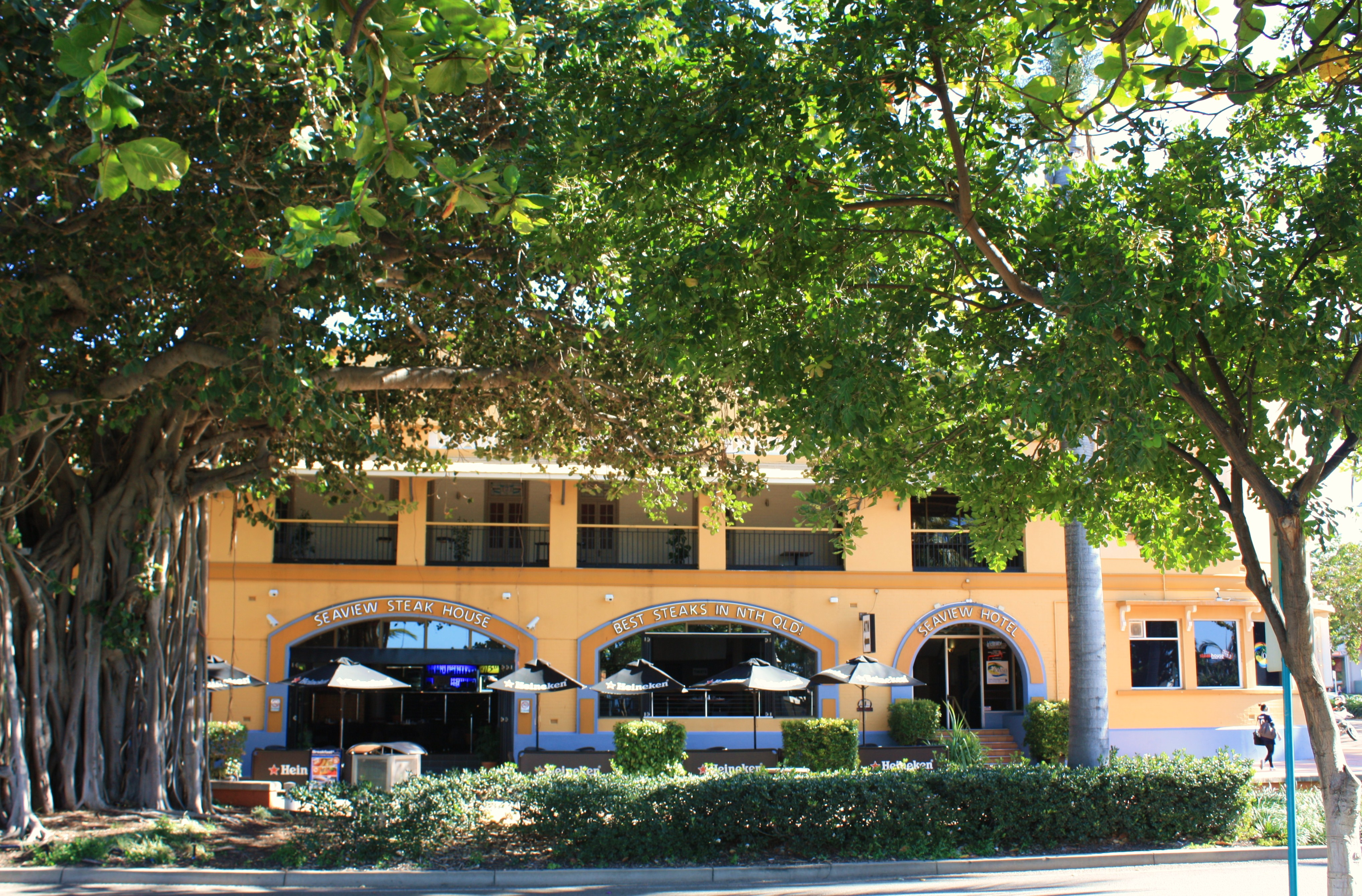
- The Seaview Hotel, North Ward

- Interactive map of North Ward
- Coordinates: 19.25°S 146.8088°E
- Country: Australia
- State: Queensland
- City: Townsville
- LGA: City of Townsville
- Location: 1.6 km (0.99 mi) NW of Townsville CBD; 1,334 km (829 mi) NNW of Brisbane

Government
  - State electorate: Townsville
  - Federal division: Herbert

Area
  - Total: 2.9 km^{2} (1.1 sq mi)

Population
  - Total: 5,073 (2021 census)
  - Density: 1,749/km^{2} (4,530/sq mi)
- Time zone: UTC+10:00 (AEST)
- Postcode: 4810
Suburbs around North Ward
| Coral Sea | Coral Sea | Coral Sea |
| Belgian Gardens | North Ward | Coral Sea |
| Castle Hill | Townsville City | Townsville City |

North Ward is a coastal suburb of Townsville in the City of Townsville, Queensland, Australia. In the 2021 census, North Ward had a population of 5,073 people.

The suburb is one of the oldest in the city but has undergone significant development over many decades. It is home to some of the city's top attractions including The Strand, the waterpark, and the rockpool.

== Geography ==
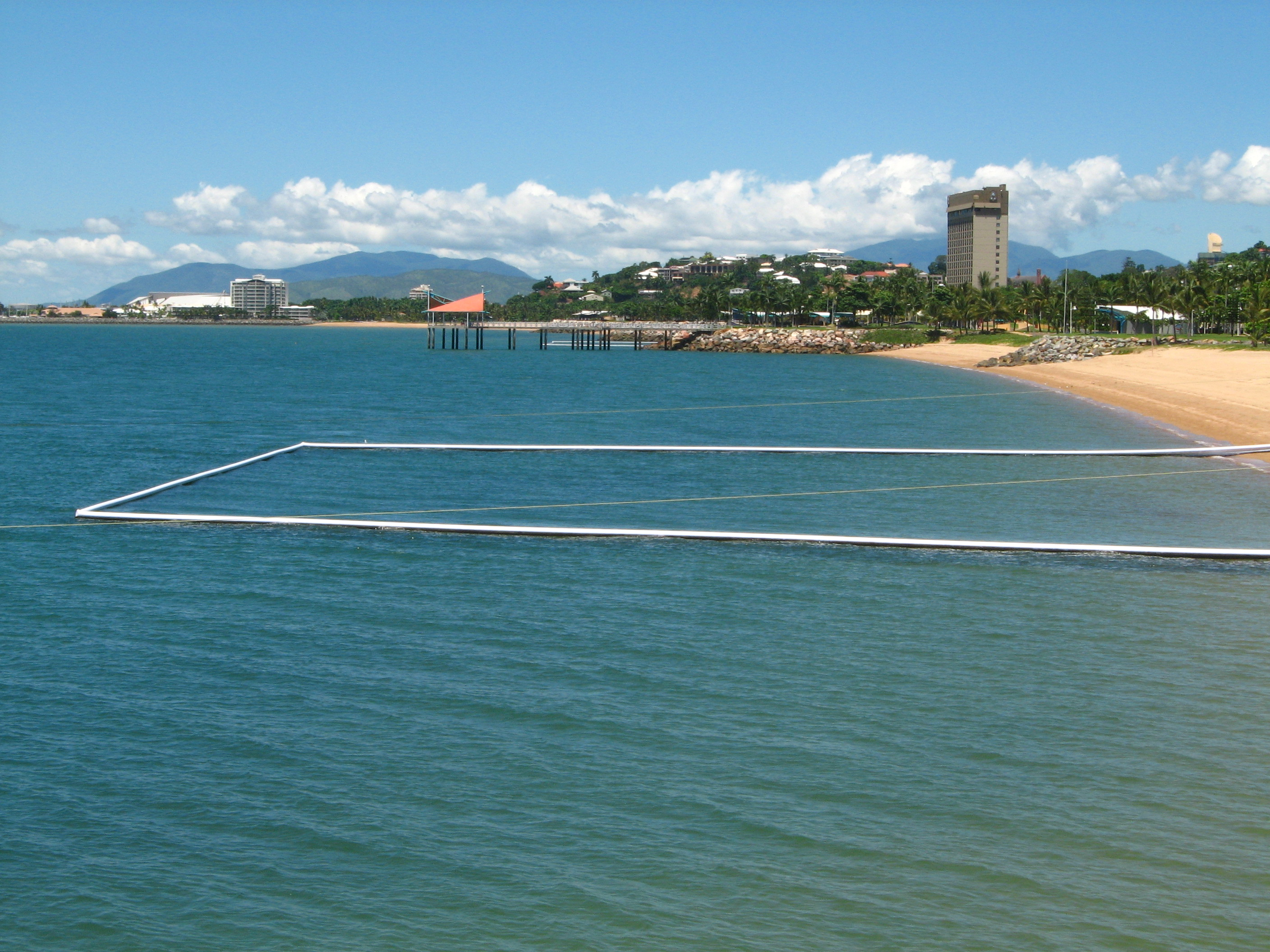
The Strand

North Ward is home to the beachside area known as The Strand, which overlooks Magnetic Island. The land is mostly flat at close to sea level except for Stanton Hill in the south of the locality (19.2551°S 146.8135°E) which rises to 60 metres.

Kissing Point is a headland at the most northerly part of North Ward.

North Ward Road (Warburton Street) runs through from north-west to south-east.

== History ==
North Ward is among Townsville's oldest suburbs, dating to the 1870s.

Townsville Central State School opened on 11 March 1869. It celebrated its centenary in 1969.

St Joseph's Catholic Primary School was established on 29 March 1873 by the Sisters of St Joseph of the Sacred Heart. Following argument between the sisters and the parish priest Father Connolly, the Sisters of St Joseph left Townsville in March 1878. The Sisters of Mercy arrived in November 1878 to take over the operation of the school.

Townsville Grammar School opened on 16 April 1888. It celebrated its centenary in 1988.

The Townsville Golf Club is the oldest golf club in Queensland, having been established at Kissing Point in 1893. The club relocated to Aitkenvale in 1921, and then relocated to Rosslea in 1924.

St Patrick's College was established by the Sisters of Mercy on 1 January 1904.

Townsville Hospital School provided primary school education for children in the Second Townsville General Hospital using a teacher from the Cootharinga Special School. The school opened on 26 August 1974 and closed on 31 March 1994. It was also known as the Cootharinga Special School Hospital Annexe, Townsville Hospital Special School, and Townsville Hospital State School.

== Demographics ==
In the 2011 census, North Ward had a population of 5,097 people.

In the 2016 census, North Ward had a population of 5,065 people.

In the 2021 census, North Ward had a population of 5,073 people.

== Heritage listings ==
North Ward has a number of heritage-listed sites, including:

- Selhurst (house), 24 Cleveland Terrace
- Second Townsville General Hospital, 24 Eyre Street
- St Joseph's Church, Fryer Street
- Yongala Lodge, 11 Fryer Street
- Kissing Point Fortification, 38–40 Howitt Street
- former North Ward Defence Complex, 4–6 Oxley Street
- Queens Gardens, Paxton Street
- School House, Townsville Grammar School, Paxton Street
- Townsville Astronomical Trigonometrical Station, Stanton Hill
- St Patrick's Convent, 45 The Strand
- Kardinia, 11 Victoria Street
- Townsville Central State School, 4–6 Warburton Street

== Education ==
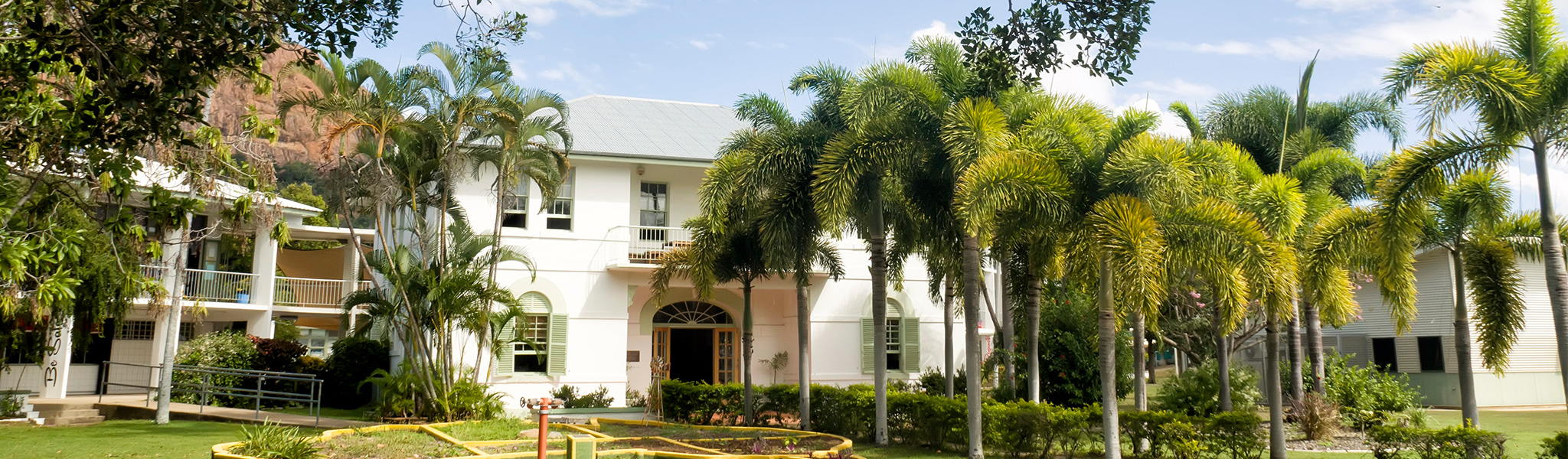
Townsville Central State School, circa 2021

Townsville Central State School is a government primary (Prep–6) school for boys and girls at 4 Warburton Street (19.2510°S 146.8120°E). In 2018, the school had an enrolment of 233 students with 18 teachers (15 full-time equivalent) and 14 non-teaching staff (10 full-time equivalent).

St Joseph's Catholic School is a private primary (Prep–6) school for boys and girls at Fryer Street (19.2533°S 146.8175°E). In 2018, the school had an enrolment of 363 students with 27 teachers (21.5 full-time equivalent) and 25 non-teaching staff (13.8 full-time equivalent).

Townsville Grammar School is a private secondary (7–12) school for boys and girls at 45 Paxton Street (19.2519°S 146.8059°E). In 2018, the school had an enrolment of 1193 students with 101 teachers (96 full-time equivalent) and 91 non-teaching staff (61 full-time equivalent).

St Patrick's College Townsville is a Catholic secondary (7–12) school for girls at 45 The Strand (19.2522°S 146.8172°E). In 2018, the school had an enrolment of 407 students with 47 teachers (41 full-time equivalent) and 26 non-teaching staff (20 full-time equivalent).

There are no government secondary schools in North Ward. The nearest government secondary school is Townsville State High School in Railway Estate to the south.

== Amenities ==
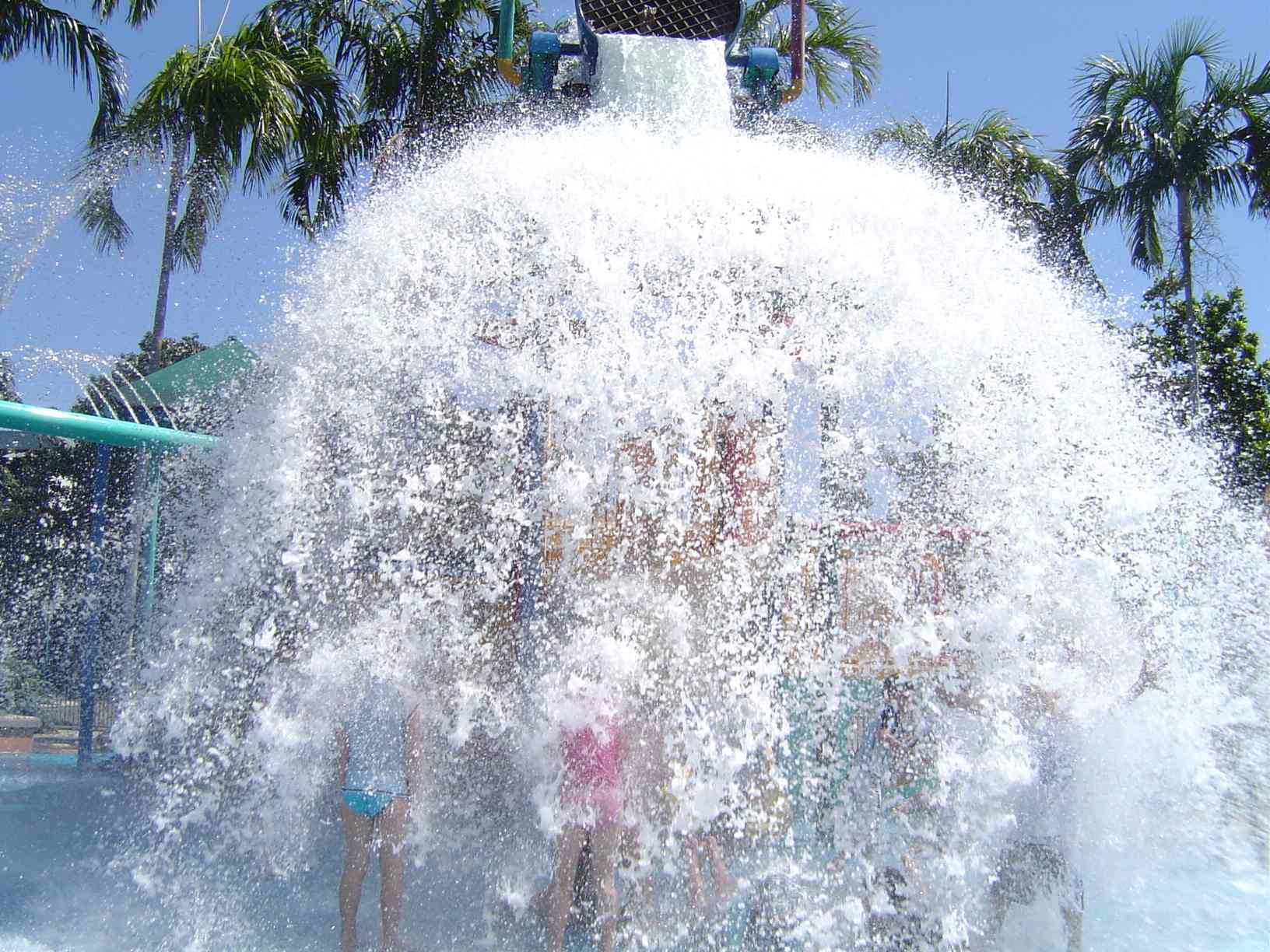
The Waterpark

There are a number of parks in the area:

- Ben Bloom Park (19.2498°S 146.8070°E)
- Castle Hill Road Park (19.2582°S 146.8005°E)
- Queens Gardens (19.2530°S 146.8099°E)
- Queens Park (19.2514°S 146.8088°E)
- Sister Kenny Park (19.2517°S 146.8180°E)
- The Strand Park (19.2462°S 146.8109°E)

Sport:

- Townsville Sports Reserve
