= Townsville Showground =

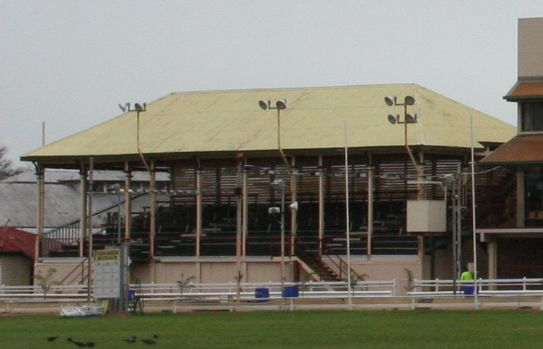
- Townsville Showground grandstand, 2007

- Location within Queensland Location within Australia
- 19.2696°S 146.7956°E
- Location: 72–104 Ingham Road, West End, City of Townsville, Queensland, Australia

Queensland Heritage Register
- Official name: Townsville Showground
- Type: state heritage (built)
- Designated: 16 October 2008
- Reference no.: 602650
- Significant period: 1880s (fabric); 1880s–ongoing (historical use)

Townsville Showground is a heritage-listed showground at 72–104 Ingham Road, West End, City of Townsville, Queensland, Australia. It was added to the Queensland Heritage Register on 16 October 2008.

== History ==
The Townsville Showground was established in 1882 by the North Queensland Pastoral and Agricultural Association (P & A Assoc.) which later became known as the Townsville Pastoral Agricultural and Industrial Association (TPA&I). It remains in use as one of Queensland's premier showgrounds and continues to provide an important regional venue for the showcasing of North Queensland industrial, pastoral and agricultural products and businesses, and for athletics events and community and entertainment events. It retains a variety of structures erected between the mid-1890s and 1970s that have been important in the functioning of the showground. These include: exhibition halls, 1901 grandstand, show ring, poultry and livestock pavilions, a dairy, stabling and marshalling areas, gates, turnstiles, and Curley Bell stands.

Encouraged by a boom in settlement due to an expansion of the pastoral and goldmining industry, and in response to the formation of the National Agricultural and Industrial Association of Queensland in 1875 and up and coming inaugural Exhibition to be held in Brisbane in August 1876, Townsville's civic and business leaders called for the establishment of the North Queensland Pastoral and Agricultural Association (P & A Association), at a meeting held in June 1876. Before a suitable site could be secured, the first Townsville Show was held in 1880 with agricultural and pastoral products displayed in the Botanical Gardens reserve and industrial and horticultural exhibits at the School of Arts.

From its inception, the Association was reflective of regional interests. In 1880, office bearers included country delegates from Hughenden, Lilliesmere, Towerhill, Woodstock, Herbert River, Charters Towers, Bluff Downs, Greenvale, Woodhouse, Mount Stuart, Dotswood, Dalrymple, Reedy Springs, Lyndhurst, Wandavale and Herbert River.

In the late 1870s the P & A Association applied to the colonial government for 16 acres (6.47 ha) at West End to be set aside as a reserve for show purposes. In January 1881, a deed of grant was issued to the Association trustees for 10 acres (4.04 ha) of Crown Land to be reserved for a showground on Flinders Street West, later known as Ingham Road. At the time the new showground adjoined several reserves including the Defence Force Reserve, the Pound Reserve and the Manure Depot. This later provided room for expansion of the grounds as well as setting up establishing a long relationship between the defence force and Show Association in regards to usage of the defence drill hall for exhibition space.

The first show was held at the new showground in 1882, and it was quickly realised by the P & A Association at the time that the area was insufficient to service the showground events with no dedicated show exhibition space or to provide a flexible sporting venue for the growing community. As a result, the showgrounds were expanded in 1888 to take in the Manure Depot and the Pound Reserve covering a total area of over 30 acres (12.14 ha).

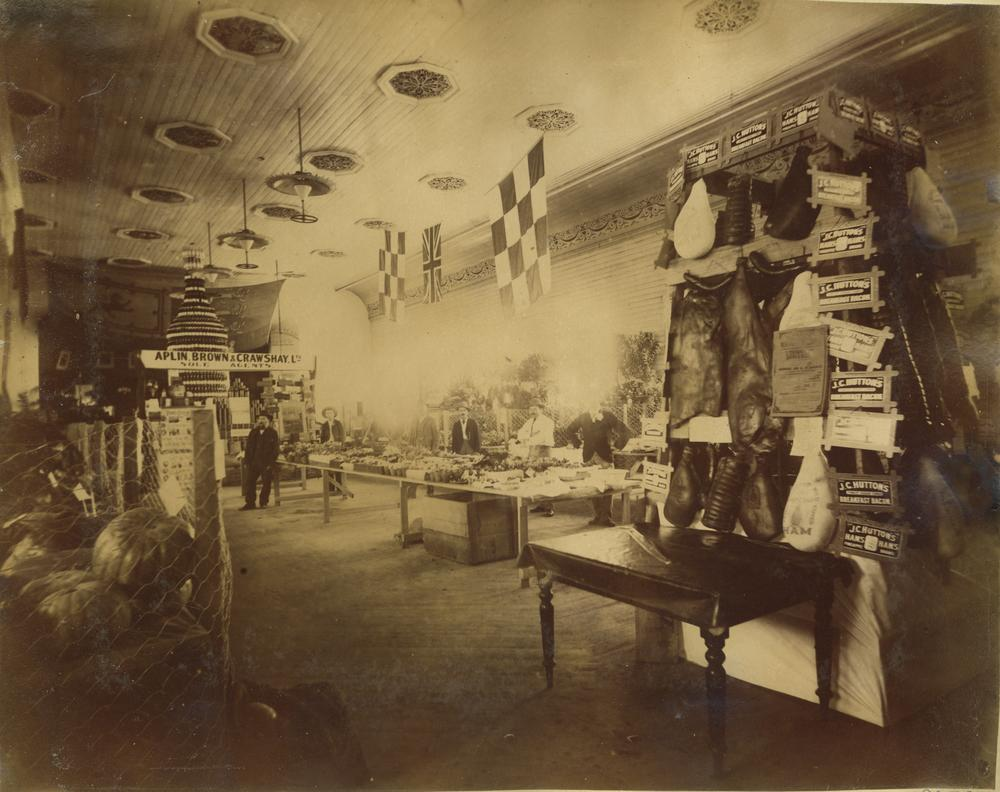
Produce on display at the Townsville Show, circa 1896

From the beginning the Townsville showground precinct was a venue where the community could meet, showcase its pastoral and agricultural produce; introduce new agricultural ideas and technology; and provide a much anticipated meeting place for the community to gather, meet relatives, and socialise. Prominent North Queensland pastoralists and agriculturalists used the venue to showcase their horses, promote their interest in breeding stock and encourage future growth in the region. In addition to stud stock, exhibitions reflected the major influence of wool, timber reserves, coffee, horticulture and minerals indicative of the pastoral, agricultural, and mining industries throughout the region. It also provided an outlet where the products of women's labour associated within the domestic environment were exhibited including displays of cookery, needlework, millinery, arts and taxonomy. In addition children were encouraged to enter events which displayed their prowess in the execution of schoolwork. Events attracted both professional and amateur participants and contributors travelled from west beyond Hughenden to take advantage of the opportunity to restock provisions, network and get together. Between Shows sporting groups took advantage of the broad even grounds with the Townsville Rugby Football Club playing regular games from July 1889.

In 1890, keeping with the principles to hold a premier regional event, the P & A Assoc. passed a motion to select country judges for the pastoral classes from around Queensland rather than select locally to ensure that the events retained a competitive edge. Successful competitors with prize exhibits from the Townsville Show were forwarded by the P & A Assoc. Committee for entry into the Royal National Agricultural and Industrial Association of Queensland Show (RNA) in Brisbane. The RNA encouraged the Townsville exhibits to be showcased at the Brisbane Exhibition, to attract interest and investment in the north. Some events such as horse competitions worked on an accumulated points system across various regional events and shows. Those with the highest points at the end of the Townsville Show were able to enter into the RNA competitions.

Freight concessions to assist the Show circuit came from a range of transport providers including the shipping company Howard Smith & Sons, and the Railway Department provided free livestock exhibit freightage for Show exhibits from and between local and regional show centres and for Show Champions sent to the RNA.

An increasingly strong attendance and event participation at the Townsville Show resulted in a shortage of exhibition space. Up until this point the exhibitions were held in the Drill Hall named the "Norman Hall", but this remained unsatisfactory as it was not always available and the alternative arrangement of using the School of Arts separated exhibition contributors from the showgrounds. In 1891 the Society committee borrowed bank finance for the erection of purpose-built exhibition buildings and pavilions. However, the upgrading of the showground coincided with a severe national economic downturn. This, combined with a devastating drought in North Queensland, impacted so greatly on the regional community that the Show was cancelled for the next two years due to lack of funds as well as exhibits.

In order to boost attendances following the recommencement of the Show in 1894, the Association made a request to the Railway Department to expand its benevolent contribution and run Show excursion trains from Hughenden to Townsville and Ravenswood to Townsville. It was noted:

"District residents took the opportunity to visit the town on these festive occasions and in a very short time were prominent amongst the successful exhibitors. Continued staunch support from the surrounding districts has played a big part in the success of the Townsville Pastoral and Agricultural Society Association."

As other pastoral and agricultural associations were established in emerging North Queensland towns in the late nineteenth century, the name of the Townsville-based association was changed to the Townsville Pastoral and Agricultural (TPA & I) Association. A circuit pattern of show days was developed in consultation with towns across North Queensland, culminating in the Townsville show held each year in July. Goodwill between local businesses and the TPA& I Association provided an excellent reciprocal arrangement with many businesses contributing substantial event prizes which encouraged good participant rates. In turn, businesses benefited economically from the free advertising in the months leading up to the Show. Co-operation between local businesses, event organisers and the TPA& I Association extended well beyond the gazetted Show day with the Townsville Showground precinct used regularly for sports and athletics as well as for trotting events.

Following the devastation of Cyclone Sigma in January 1896, a major thrust of expansion and upgrade to the showgrounds was proposed including the provision of 30 new iron cattle pens, enlargement of the ring (which also included plans for the addition of an outer show ring) and a 400-seat grandstand. While exhibition pavilions and dairy and livestock facilities had continually improved since the first show, the lack of a grandstand did not reflect the prestige of the Townsville Show. In particular, since a new grandstand was planned to be constructed at the Cluden Racecourse in late 1896, discussions had been underway to make provision for one at the Showground.

Tunbridge & Tunbridge, one of Townsville's principal architectural firms and designer of the Cluden Racecourse grandstand, were requested to submit an estimate for the upgrade. The Tunbridge brothers (Walter Howard and Oliver Allan) had entered into partnership in Townsville in 1887, and soon developed a substantial North Queensland architectural practice with offices in Charters Towers and later Rockhampton. Tunbridge and Tunbridge designed many Townsville hotels, including the Metropole (1887), Victoria Park (1896), Lowth's (1897), Victoria Bridge (1900), Empire (1901), Sovereign (1904) and Carriers Arms (1906). Over the course of 1897 discussions were held as to the best grandstand location for superior Show ring views. A totalizator was also planned to be incorporated into the structure to service the trotting events.

Tenders for the grandstand were called in February 1901. The grandstand, 96 feet (29 m) in length and 47 feet (14 m) deep was to be erected on a mound 176 feet (54 m) long and 40 feet (12 m) deep. The gentle rise to the building was designed to have no steps with seats rising in tiers from the ground in front of the grandstand. In the centre was a stairwell leading down below the stand and giving access to the luncheon room below. A bar, kitchen, lavatories and rest room were accommodated in this sub-floor. Bricks were used to support the foundations and retaining wall of the building with timber and iron used for the superstructure. To make good use of the prevailing breeze it was proposed the building face east–west and incorporate louvres on the top tier to the roof. Incorporating a decorative balustrade, the structure was designed to accommodate up to 1000 persons.

With the addition of a new grandstand, the Townsville Showground was complete as a dedicated showground facility offering numerous exhibition halls, substantial cattle yards, horse and dairy buildings and poultry sheds with the show ring neatly encompassed by a white picket fence.

In early 1903 Cyclone Leonta crossed the coast causing widespread devastation to Townsville including the showground. Three months later in a show of public unity the community held a grand opening of the Show to welcome the officiating Vice Regal party including the Queensland Governor Sir Herbert Chermside and his wife Lady Chermside, and Queensland Premier Hon. Robert Philp. The official party and record crowd of over 3500 people were entertained by a display of horse events staged by station owners taking the prime opportunity to show their purpose bred remounts with a view of securing trade overseas.

In 1913 the Showgrounds grounds were again the central venue where the community could gather. To celebrate the fiftieth anniversary of the founding of Townsville a Jubilee carnival was promoted by the Townsville and District Development Association. Nearly all major celebrations and community events finished at the Townsville Showground, which provided a fitting venue for the community to enjoy the fireworks display after the opening torchlight procession from the centre of town. Over the next week, the community and region enjoyed a number of sporting and novelty events, including bicycle races, athletics, children's sporting events and music contests bringing in competitors from Cairns, Mareeba and Charters Towers and attracting state of the art mechanical entertainment in the form of a steam-powered merry-go-round.

In the 1910s the Townsville Municipal Council began a series of drainage works programme in the West End area. From 1913 onwards substantial stormwater drains were constructed to direct the flow of water from Castle Hill to counter the effects of tropical downpours. Consisting of large concrete and stone pitched storm water drains and with at least two drains traversed the Showgrounds and the scope of the drainage programme was not fully completed in the mid-1920s. These works enabled a review of the Showground facilities with low-lying areas of the grounds built up, boundary fences extended, new turnstiles installed and the popular poultry and bird fanciers pavilion extended.

In absence of a major exhibition facility, the adjacent military drill hall had long been used as the major exhibition hall. The special relationship between the Defence Force and TPA & I Association was reinforced through Memorial Day sports and demobilisation events in support of the returned local men who had fought during World War I. To acknowledge their efforts the Association Committee resolved to admit free of charge any soldiers in uniform, with no charge for machinery exhibits for returned soldiers engaged in agricultural pursuits. In 1918, Alfred Barton Brady, Government Architect for Queensland, oversaw the design of the Defence force Drill Hall. The name of Andrew Irving – a successful architectural draftsman with the Queensland Public Works Department – appears on the drawings. The new Drill hall was constructed around 1919 within the former defence force reserve of four acres to be used "... for horticulture, preserves, arts and crafts, children's section, caged birds and district exhibits". An open parade ground was located between the show ring and the Drill Hall.

In 1924 the show circuit in North Queensland encompassed Mackay, Proserpine, Bowen, Ayr, and Charters Towers, and as far west as Hughenden, with the Townsville show being the premier event in the circuit.

Sideshows were discouraged from the Townsville show prior to the 1920s, as it was felt that they attracted an undesirable class of people who might disrupt the "respectable" show proceedings. The fractious relationship between the sideshow men and the Queensland Chamber of Agriculture spilled over in the early 1920s with the sideshow men in Townsville staging a protest march, complete with a procession of ponies and posters, advocating a boycott of the TPA&I Show. When eventually admitted, the sideshow men were confined to a small area between the butcher shops and the poultry pavilion. One of the first sideshows to gain access to the Townsville show was the Sharman and Staig Boxing Troupe in 1924. Within 15 years the Showmen's Guild played an integral role in the Townsville Show.

By 1929 the showground improvements included a grandstand, exhibition hall, secretary's office, committee room, fat cattle yards, stud and dairy cattle stalls, dog shed, poultry pavilion and pavilions erected by various firms. The grounds were enclosed by an 8-foot (2.4 m) high iron fence and the show ring by a picket fence, and "at intervals along the boundary, magnificent trees give a cool and picturesque appearance to the surrounds" (Brisbane newspaper article cited in Thuringowa Library Heritage Services Information Sheet Number 12).

During the severe economic depression of the early 1930s a flood of public support resulted in a range of planned fundraisers and benefits which ensured that the Show continued throughout the Depression. The Depression also gave rise to other community activities staged at the Showground, including a soup kitchen to cater for the large number of itinerant workers or for those just down on their luck, and as a camp ground for the 9th and 49th Battalions' reunion held in conjunction with the 1933 Townsville Show week.

An increase of grounds use led to improved event facilities with additional seating offering trackside viewing provided via a series of eight-tiered stands. Constructed by local manufacturer Curley Bell during the late 1920s and early 1930s and later modified to incorporate safety rails, the viewing stands became affectionately known as the "Curley Bell's". The new stands provided better views of trotting events, which were reintroduced in 1939 with competitors and spectators from far and wide. By 1939, the Townsville Show was described in the popular Cummins & Campbells Monthly Magazine as the "Show Window of the North; but it is more than that." The precinct was regarded as a community facility, as evidenced from the expanding repertoire of events throughout the 1930s including a gymkhana, motor cycle racing, a rodeo and greyhound racing. The greyhound racing track opened on 19 December 1936.

In the late 1930s concerns were raised at each TPA&I Association committee meeting about the Showground's ability to provide adequate exhibition space. The overcrowding of exhibits made it evident that a larger exhibition hall was necessary if the Townsville Show was to continue to attract ongoing competitors and exhibitors as well as businesses and suppliers of goods and services. Local architectural firm W & M Hunt were approached to design an exhibition hall on the brief that it could also fulfil the additional roles of dance hall and rentable picture theatre. However, the final design was based upon a commercial warehouse that belonged to Heatley and was being constructed at the time in Ogden Street. To accommodate the new hall the dairy pavilion was removed and reassembled closer to the stud cattle pavilion in the south-eastern end of the grounds, and was upgraded with new milking pens and additional iron fencing. New horse stalls were constructed along the Parkes Street fence line to make up for the shortage of stabling accommodation for visiting horses.

Messrs Hanson & Sons successfully tendered £6130 for the construction of the new Exhibition Hall in late November 1937. When completed in 1939 the hall provided ample floor space for exhibits and for dancing purposes, being one of the largest dance venues in North Queensland. Three large sliding doors along each side of the hall and another at each end offered ample ventilation. Lighting was achieved by three lantern lights running along the ridge of each of the two gable roofs. Access to the dance hall was through the main entrance fronting Flinders Street (Ingham Road). After World War II this hall became known as Heatley Hall, in memory of Talbot Leslie Heatley, one of the longest-serving members and former president of the TPA&I Association.

During World War II in April 1942 the Australian Army seconded the showground for military purposes and the annual Show was suspended for three years. The advance parties of HQ 5 Division and 29 Infantry Brigade had arrived in Townsville and the Divisional HQ personnel were accommodated in the Showgrounds. Additional prefabricated warehouses were constructed at the showground in 1942–1943 (including the No.4 Bulk Store, later known as Keiry Hall).

Regular Saturday night dances were held in the Heatley Hall to provide entertainment for local citizens and troops alike. Many local couples met and courted here during the war. During the three raids on the city by Japanese flying boats operating out of Rabaul in late July 1942, West End residents took advantage of the large concrete and stone-pitched storm water drains (approximately 1.6 high and up to 2.5 metres (8 ft 2 in) wide in some areas) at the Showground as unofficial air raid shelters. When WWII was proclaimed officially over, the Victory Parade procession marched from the central business district and ended at the Townsville Showground where sideshow entertainment was provided for the crowd.

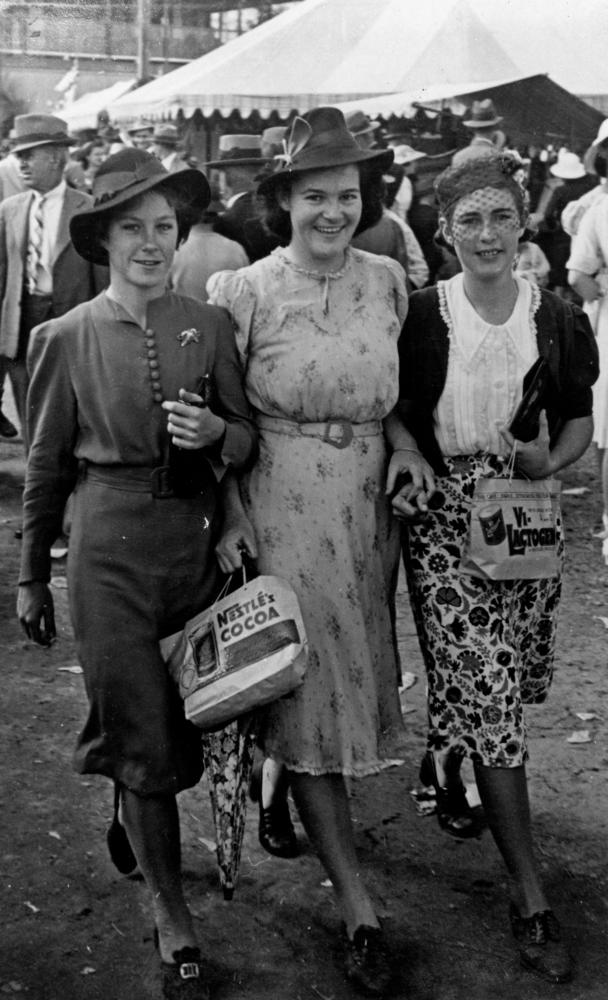
Three young women dressed up for a day at the Townsville Show, 1941

At the completion of the war the annual pattern of Show planning and activities recommenced and the northern circuit reformed. Local and regional show-goers travelled to attend the premier event and dressed up to enjoy a day "at the show". For many it was the annual opportunity to meet relatives, socialise with friends, and have a photograph taken in their best clothes. For some it was the only opportunity to have a photograph taken.

By 1951, through the incorporation of former Army buildings, the showground facilities had expanded to include three exhibition halls, a grandstand, extended agricultural and pastoral stalls for cattle and horses, dairy stalls and milking shed, as well as poultry and dog enclosures, a caretaker's office, association offices, a Pacific Ice cream booth, re-positioned entrance and side gates, as well as ticket offices and the Curly Bell stand. During this period the North Queensland pastoral industry renewed its breeding effort to produce a breed of cattle resilient to northern climatic conditions. As a result, the Townsville Show hosted the Brahman cattle breed for the first time in 1952 and the Santa Gertrudis in 1953. Both breeds were received by an enthusiastic crowd.

In 1969 the North Queensland regional Show circuit included: Rockhampton, Mackay, Proserpine, Home Hill, Charters Towers, Bowen, Ayr, Townsville, Ingham, Malanda, Atherton, Innisfail, Cairns, Mossman, Collinsville, Tully with a broader show circuit to Brisbane. Townsville Show competition categories were either "District" or "Local". District events embraced any area North of the 24th parallel (approximately Gladstone) and west to the Queensland border. Local entries were drawn from Townsville, Thuringowa, Ayr, Dalrymple, Charters Towers and Hinchinbrook. The Railway Department continued to provide free livestock exhibit freightage for Show exhibits from and between local and regional show centres and for Show champions to the RNA. Excursion tickets were available for outlying towns and this practice continued into the 1970s. Road freightage was subsidized under The State Transport Act 1960 for the movement of livestock, machinery and produce to and from the Show.

In 1971 the new cattle yards incorporating water troughs and a cattle sale arena complete with auctioneers platform were made available to the North Queensland Livestock and Property Brokers Produce Association for cattle sales. The Townsville Show also encouraged regional charities and organisations such as the Queensland Bush Children's Fund, H.M. Prison Farm and Rural Youth Clubs to exhibit and raise money.

The impact of Cyclone Althea in 1972 provided the impetus for a major expansion and modification program to cater for changing Showground requirements. Every building sustained damage. Those that incorporated cyclone bracing survived relatively intact - such as the current Poultry Shed and Heatley Hall; others – such as the betting shed, caretaker's cottage, pig pavilion and Keiry Hall – were severely damaged or collapsed such as the Drill Hall (known as the Garbutt Hall). The show ring track was extended to its current elliptical shape to better cater for racing interests such as harness racing and motor cycle and bicycle races, and an officials' box was constructed to oversee the greyhound racing. The ring was enclosed by a new fence constructed of concrete block with cyclone mesh fencing. The fence, incorporated a decorative triangular pattern which was also used in the upgrade to one of the oldest Exhibition pavilions adjoining the Heatley Hall. The greyhound track underwent renovation including a conversion to sand and race distances of 380, 498 and 643 metres. The first meeting on sand was during December 1976. The track hosts the Townsville Cup on an annual basis.

When the show ring was extended the main grandstand was dismantled and relocated to its current position. Without the advantage of the earth mound and front spectator seats, two new steel access stairs were added. A second grandstand was constructed to provide additional seating and exhibition /office space. The Showground continually changed from the mid-1970s with nearly all of the substantial shade trees along Ingham Road removed, and smaller buildings constructed. Around the back of the ring where the cattle yards had previously stood, a large liquor booth was constructed as well as a Cat and Cavy pavilion, a kitchen, additional ablution blocks, additional horse stalls, and various smaller buildings.

The Townsville Show remains popular with the local and regional community and continues to enjoy record attendances with an average of over 60,000 people attending the event each year over the three-day and four- night event. The contemporary range of entertainment and cultural activities conducted at the Showground have expanded to cater to extreme sports events, public rock concerts and providing a venue for motor homes and motor bike clubs while maintaining a strong emphasis on attracting use by local community clubs and not-for-profit organisations.

== Description ==
The Townsville Showground is located on the southern side of Castle Hill and adjacent to Ingham Road approximately 5 kilometres (3.1 mi) from the city centre: it is bounded by Ingham Road, Kings Road, Woolcock Street and Parkes Street with the main entrance accessed from Parkes Street off an access easement which runs alongside the railway line. Two purpose built sub surface stormwater drains traverse the grounds: one in a north–south direction and the other east–west.

Encompassing a total area of over 14.38 hectares, the Townsville showground comprises a collection of purpose-built buildings, yards, ticket booths, gates, turnstiles, additional seating and open space. These are eclectic and utilitarian in form with many examples of additions, re-location or building materials recycled within the precinct. Elements of particular significance include the stud cattle pavilions (c. 1890s), central show ring arena (est. 1882), Grandstand (1901), Heatley Hall (c. 1940), Poultry Exhibition pavilion (c. 1920), Exhibition pavilion, (c. 1920) ticket boxes, main entrance and side entrance (c. 1946), as well as mature Banyon trees within the grounds.

Principal elements of cultural heritage significance include the following structures.

=== Tunbridge & Tunbridge Grandstand (1901) ===
The roof is hipped with eaves overhang of corrugated steel sheeting on timber framing and timber trusses. The rear wall of the upper level retains the original timber louvres designed for ventilation. Two aisles provide access to the three banks of bench seating with the rear six rows including timber lumbar support. The grandstand has a timber floor in the grandstand seating area. Tall hardwood columns with mouldings and a decorative timber bressumer to the front and sides create nine separate bays. Most of the original decorative brackets are missing. Access to the Grandstand is achieved via two pairs of introduced steel stairs constructed in the 1970s when the building was relocated to its current location. Underneath the grandstand is exhibition/storage space with a concrete floor which is accessed from the sides and rear wall. An additional open shaded area has been added to the rear with a gabled roof.

=== Interwar Toilets (c. 1920–1940) ===
Located next to the Grandstand the toilets are timber framed with chamferboard external cladding and high level timber louvred ventilation. The roof is hipped with corrugated steel sheeting and unusual semi-circular steel ridge and hip flashing.

=== Central Show Ring (est. 1882) ===
The central ring consists of a grassed centred arena encircled by an elliptically shaped track with the two long straights covering a distance of approximately 600 metres (2,000 ft) with a perimeter gravel track and inner track of sand loam. The inner fence is fabricated from welded piping with small steel sections and a top rail. This incorporates a mechanical "lure" facility used for greyhound racing. The outer fence is constructed of concrete block with a decorative triangular motif at regular intervals. The outer ring follows the fall of the land and is strengthened via concrete buttresses. Posts constructed of steel pipes are spaced at regular intervals and filled by a steel cyclone mesh infill with a metal handrail on top. The whole outer fence is painted white. Access to the ring is achieved through regular access points, some which are concrete ramps. The Show ring and arena provide a central focal point by which the Exhibition buildings, liquor stands, amenities are constructed around. The ring along with the grandstands, poultry shed, Heatley Hall and a former Army Hall are located on the northern end of the precinct, with the main showground entrance and office area located on the north eastern corner.

=== Exhibition building/ Poultry and Bird Fancier Pavilion (c. 1920) ===
The Poultry and Bird fancier pavilion is a long rectangular building measuring approximately 30 by 9 metres (98 ft × 30 ft) and running parallel to Heatley Hall and the Townsville Greyhound Racing Club. The building has a hipped corrugated steel roof incorporating King post trusses with 10 skylights at regular intervals. The interior floor has timber deck flooring supported on timber stumps. The building is clad with painted corrugated steel sheeting which is not full height and chicken wire infill provides ventilation. The place has two rows of purpose built poultry coops constructed in the mid-1940s that run full length of the building. Another two rows of coops are located along the perimeter interior walls. Three aisles, one central aisle and two side isles provide viewing access to the displays. Access to the building is gained through entrances on each end as well as through two side entrances on the western side. Each entrance has a decorative steel gate with cyclone mesh infill.

=== Heatley Hall (1939) ===
This is the largest Exhibition pavilion on the site approximately 58 by 20 metres (190 ft × 66 ft) and 5.5 metres (18 ft) high with twin gabled roofs, each with three hipped roof lantern lights at a length of approx 5 metres (16 ft) which run along the two ridges. The lantern lights incorporate two fixed windows one at each end and six hopper windows which push out to provide additional ventilation. Timber buttresses provide additional strengthening to the high external walls which are clad in galvanised corrugated iron sheeting painted green. The corrugated iron cladding does not extend the full height of the wall instead infill to the rafters is provided via timber lattice panels which also provide additional ventilation. Horizontal timber slat panels conceal the underfloor area.

Access is achieved through three large sliding doors on each side with an additional door on the interior Showground end. The original decorative facade with parapet end, providing street access (Ingham Road) has been modified to a flat sheeted wall. Internally there is a central row of columns supporting timber trusses and a box gutter. Hardwood tongue and groove flooring is laid throughout and supported on timber framing on top of concrete piers.

=== Kiery Hall/No 4 Bulk Store (c. 1942) ===
Keiry Hall has a single low pitched roof of corrugated galvanised steel sheeting over hardwood purlins on open web steel girders spanning the building width. The building measures approximately 56 by 12 metres (184 ft × 39 ft). The eastern wall of the hall is original comprising a row of concrete columns with walling of timber stud framing and painted corrugated galvanised sheet cladding infill. The rebuilt western, northern and southern walls (post Cyclone Althea) are constructed with steel columns, recycled timber purlins and painted corrugated galvanised sheet cladding. A lower height skillion roofed external addition has been built onto the western wall between pairs of roller doors. The addition is sheeted with painted corrugated galvanised steel to roof and walls.

Two pairs of large timber framed and vertically boarded roller doors are positioned in both eastern and western walls of the hall whilst a pair of smaller hinged doors is located off-centre in both the northern and southern end walls. The building is unlined with a paint finish generally remaining on most of the internal walls. The internal floor is of concrete pavers laid to a fall.

=== Entrance gates and Ticket box and turnstiles (c. 1940s) ===
Located on the corner of Ingham Road and Parkes Street, the main entrance gates are constructed of welded steel bars in decorative geometric design incorporating the Townsville Pastoral Association logo. A pair of identical constructed entrance gates are located at the Ingham Road "Besser" entrance.

The ticket booth has a hipped corrugated steel sheeted roof supported on a timbered framed building and clad with chamber board wall. Steel mesh secures the ticket box opening counter. Most of the turnstiles have been removed with only three remaining turnstiles located adjoining the ticket booth.

=== Security building (c. 1940s) ===
The timber-framed building clad with weatherboards has a gabled roof, sheeted with corrugated steel and supported on concrete piers topped with termite caps. Entrance to the building is achieved up three moulded concrete steps through a single wooden door located on the southern side of the building. Two pairs of casement windows are located on each side of the building.

=== Police Building (c. 1940s) ===
This is a small rectangular building approximately 8 by 5 metres (26 ft × 16 ft) clad in small panels of fibre cement sheeting at the front and larger panels on the sides. The building is accessed via a single door located on the right hand side and a small fixed window with security grill on the left. The small front panels extend up to form a small parapet and the front incorporates a small awning over the window and door. The building has a skillion roof, clad with corrugated steel and the building is based on a concrete slab which extends out the front of the building to form a small patio. This has been extended at some point to run across the front of buildings 13 & 14.

=== Landscape and grounds ===
The showground precinct has a number of substantial shade trees including banyan trees (Ficus benghalensis) (c. 1900), weeping figs (Ficus benjamina), and Albizia (Albizia julibrissin) (c. 1970s). The trees are predominantly located at the livestock area at the south western side of the Showground with the exception of two. One is located at the entrance adjoining the caravan park and other behind the Keiry Hall exhibition hall.

=== Curley Bells (1920s–1930s) ===
These spectator stands named after their designer/builder are the original pre-fabricated seats constructed from welded piping and small steel sections. Seating is provided by 8 levels of hardwood board seats bolted to the framing and used as both steps and seats.

=== Stone pitched and concrete stormwater drains (c. 1910–mid 1920) ===
Two identified systems of stormwater drains measuring approximately 1.6 high and up to 2.5 metres (8 ft 2 in) wide in some areas are located within the showgrounds. These drains are constructed of a variety of methods including predominately large stone pitched and mortar walls with a ceiling of concrete with imprint of timber large planked formwork for square ceiling and small narrow boards for the barrel vault ceiling. More recent sections are concrete block with steel planked formwork imprint. One drain begins at the base of Castle Hill and runs on a north–south axis to traverse a portion of the Show ring from behind the poultry pavilion and exiting into the large stormwater canal near the cattle yards. The second stormwater drain runs on an east–west axis from Kings Road near Keiry Hall and runs between the Stud Cattle pavilion and caretakers cottage to exit into the large stormwater canal from the bottom of Payne street.

=== Stud Cattle Pavilion (c. 1890s) ===
The Stud Cattle Pavilion (70 by 9 metres (230 ft × 30 ft)) consists of a long building (45.7 metres (150 ft)) and a shorter building (18.3 metres (60 ft)) separated by an open area (6 metres (20 ft)) with a small parade ground outside the northern entrance which is shaded by a mature Albizia (Albizia julibrissin ). Both buildings are of similar rural vernacular construction with inner and outer bush timber pole columns supporting a gable roof of corrugated galvanised steel sheeting on sawn hardwood rafters and beams and are painted white internally. The side walls are clad in painted corrugated galvanised steel on timber rails fixed to the outer bush timber poles with openings, for light and ventilation, covered in an open steel mesh spaced along their length. Bolted along the rails are various styles of forged iron and steel rings for tethering cattle. A skillion roofed storage area has been added to the southern side of the longer building.

The main public access to the longer building is via a central entry through the northern wall to a central aisle and through the eastern end. This end has a high opening of about 4 metres (13 ft). The gable end is horizontally boarded with spaced vertical boards up to about 2.5 metres (8 ft 2 in) completing the end wall. The pavilion has two enclosed tack rooms in a central location on either side of the pedestrian corridor. These small rooms are sheeted in painted corrugated galvanised steel of one sheet length height. Extending above the corrugated iron and up to the rafters are timber slats. Both small rooms have double timber doors. One set of doors is painted with barnyard motifs in a naive style.

The open area between the buildings accommodates two wash down stalls, and a drinking trough. This open area provides the main access into the shorter building and minor access into the long building. The shorter building has an overhead deck constructed at approx 2 metres (6 ft 7 in) height on hardwood joists and pine flooring on both sides of a central way. The pavilion has two enclosed tack rooms at the eastern end of the pavilion on either side of the pedestrian corridor at the point of entry. A concrete floor runs through the full length of the Stud Cattle Pavilion.

=== The Dairy Pavilion (c. 1939) ===
A gable roofed building with skillion additions to both sides roofed with corrugated galvanised steel on simple bolted hardwood trusses to the gable and hardwood rafter construction to the skillions all supported on steel pipe columns. The gable end, southern sidewall and rear wall are clad in corrugated galvanised steel whilst the northern side of the building is open. The front wall has vertical hardwood slabs to either side of two central vehicle access openings and a central placed sign indicating the pavilion.

Internal dividing partitions are of vertical corrugated steel sheeting with livestock pens framed in steel piping to either side of the building. The smaller (poddy calf) pens are along the northern side. The building is unpainted and has a concrete floor.

On the right hand side of the dairy pavilion are a series of open air blue painted steel pipe livestock stalls which run the full length of dairy and long the northern side of the cattle yards and end at the cattle ramps located at the Cattle Sales Arena.

=== Cattle yards (c. 1970) ===
Extensive cattle yards are contained in 8 sections which include over 100 cattle stall partitions. Fence post are former rail track sections with a top plate and middle rails of steel piping, with welded infill of galvanised reinforcing mesh. Each stall is serviced by a water trough with water reticulated from a raised central water system with intermittent taps. Six aisles allow pedestrian inspection of the yards and each aisle has a concrete pavement with a square paved pattern and laid to a fall. Several shade trees are present in the cattle yard area. All trees are introduced species.

=== Cattle Sales Arena (c. 1970) ===
Adjoining the cattle yards is a part open purpose designed stand for the auction of cattle and horses. The arena has U-shaped plan of tiered seating around the sales pen and a raised auctioneers platform over the gate entry to the sales pen. The construction is steel pipe framing with an aluminium roof sheeting on hardwood rafters. The tiered seating is of hardwood boards fixed on angle iron supports in a slat style. Adjoining the sales arena are two loading ramps constructed of concrete and steel pipe rails. Two timber carved cattle heads adorn two posts to indicate the cattle area.

=== Horse Stalls (c. 1970) ===
Located on the left hand side of the dairy pavilion the horse stalls are constructed from former rail track sections used as fence posts with stalls created by steel pipe horizontals in-between the columns. The skillion roof has steel pipe rafters and is sheeted with corrugated steel roof sheeting. The horse stalls provide an ambulatory link between the former dairy pavilion and the Stud cattle pavilion. Ample shade is afforded to the horse stalls by least two weeping figs (Ficus benjamina).

=== Caretakers House (c. 1920) ===
Located near the Woolcock Street boundary fence, the house has a hipped roof, sheeted in corrugated short sheet steel with skillion awnings to the enclosed verandahs. The house is raised above ground level with access stairs from within the Showgrounds.

=== Toilet & shower amenities (post 1950) ===
Timber framed separate male and female toilet and shower facilities sheeted with painted corrugated galvanised steel to skillion roof and walls. Facilities are located at the south eastern end of the Show ring near the cattle sales arena.

== Heritage listing ==
Townsville Showground was listed on the Queensland Heritage Register on 16 October 2008 having satisfied the following criteria.

The place is important in demonstrating the evolution or pattern of Queensland's history.

In use as a showground since 1882, the Townsville Showground is integral to the important Queensland showground circuit that culminates in the annual Royal National Agricultural and Industrial Association of Queensland (RNA) Exhibition in Brisbane. It remains one of the longest-running showground facilities outside Brisbane and is one of North Queensland's premier showgrounds.

The place provided an important venue for showcasing and facilitating the expansion of pastoral, agriculture and industrial production and innovation in North Queensland during the late nineteenth century and much of the twentieth century.

The place is important in demonstrating the principal characteristics of a particular class of cultural places.

The Townsville Showground, developed between the 1880s and the 1970s, is an intact regional showground facility which demonstrates the principal elements characteristic of its type. These include: exhibition halls, grandstands, the Curley Bell stands, show ring, poultry and livestock facilities, dairy sheds, stabling and marshalling areas, as well as gates and turnstiles.

The 1901 grandstand at the Townsville Showground is one of two major grandstands designed and constructed in the late nineteenth/early twentieth century by Tunbridge and Tunbridge, one of Townsville's principal architectural firms and designers. The other grandstand is located at Cluden Racecourse (1896). It is important in illustrating the quality of their design work.

The place is important because of its aesthetic significance.

The Townsville Showground incorporates elements that are aesthetically significant including the Tunbridge & Tunbridge grandstand (1901), interwar amenities blocks, Heatley Hall (1939), the Stud Stock pavilions (c.1890s), entrance gates, ticket boxes, Curley Bell stands (1920–30s), poultry pavilion, show ring and mature Banyan trees.

The place has a strong or special association with a particular community or cultural group for social, cultural or spiritual reasons.

The place has a strong social significance for generations of Townsville and North Queensland families who have attended the annual pastoral and agricultural exhibitions since 1882. The 1901 grandstand and Heatley Hall have particular social significance as the place where families enjoy watching events and where couples court.

The place remains important as a venue for major regional community and entertainment events.

The place is important as one of the few venues where the products of women's and children's labour associated with the domestic and educational environments has been exhibited regularly since the late nineteenth century.

The place has a special association with the life or work of a particular person, group or organisation of importance in Queensland's history.

Townsville Showground has a strong and special association with the important work of the Townsville Pastoral, Agricultural and Industrial Association in fostering the expansion of pastoral, agriculture and industrial production and innovation in North Queensland since 1882.
