= Great Northern Hotel, Townsville =

Great Northern Hotel
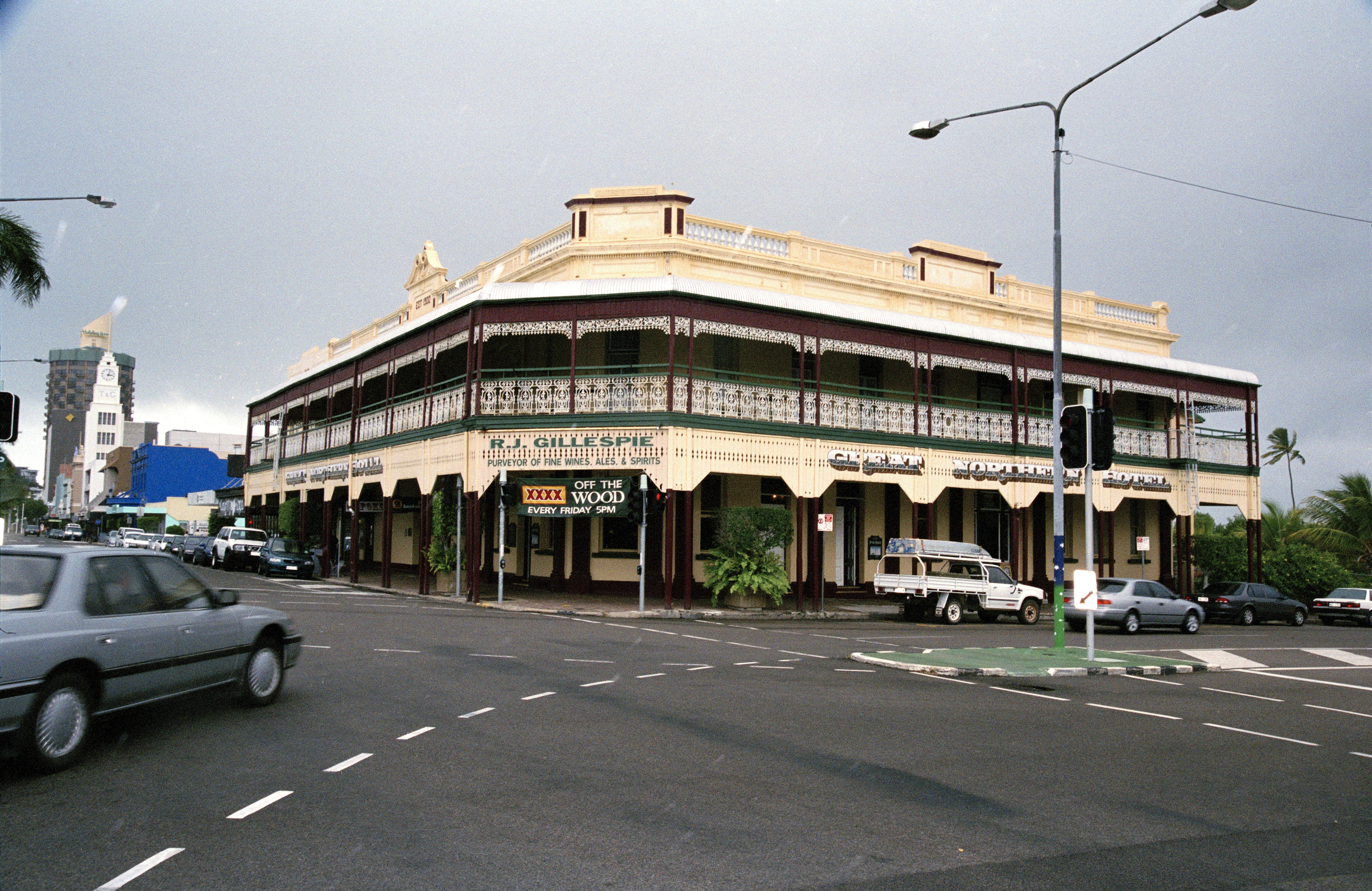
- Great Northern Hotel in Townsville, 2005

- Location within Queensland Location within Australia
- 19.263°S 146.8147°E
- Location: 500 Flinders Street, Townsville CBD, City of Townsville, Queensland, Australia

History
- Design period: 1900–1914 (early 20th century)
- Built: 1900–1901
- Built for: Wilson Hart & Company

Site notes
- Architect: Tunbridge & Tunbridge

Queensland Heritage Register
- Official name: Great Northern Hotel
- Type: state heritage (built)
- Designated: 21 October 1992
- Reference no.: 600908
- Significant period: 1900s (fabric); 1901–ongoing (historical use, social)
- Significant components: lead light/s, furniture/fittings

Great Northern Hotel was a heritage-listed hotel at 500 Flinders Street, Townsville CBD, City of Townsville, Queensland, Australia. It was designed by Tunbridge & Tunbridge and built from 1900 to 1901. It was added to the Queensland Heritage Register on 21 October 1992.

== History ==
The Great Northern Hotel, a large, two-storeyed brick and timber hotel, was erected in 1900–1901 for Townsville timber firm Wilson Hart & Company, owners of the site. It was designed by prominent Townsville architects Tunbridge and Tunbridge.

The application to build the Great Northern Hotel appears to have been initiated following the Queensland Government's announcement in 1900 of plans to erect a new Townsville railway terminus on land off Blackwood Street beside Ross Creek, which would bring the terminus closer to the eastern end of Flinders Street and to the retail and business heart of Townsville. Almost immediately (June 1900), applications were lodged to erect hotels on two corners of the nearby intersection of Flinders and Blackwood Streets - one being the Great Northern, the other replacing an existing hotel (possibly the Newmarket Hotel). Both applicants intended to erect first-class hotels, both argued that Townsville suffered a lack of first-class accommodation - the hotels erected during the boom of the 1880s no longer offering the level of comfort and facilities required by turn-of-the-century travellers - and both applications were approved provided the buildings were erected within the time specified (9 months in each case). Only the Great Northern came to fruition, and when opened early in 1901, was marketed as the hotel closest to the new Townsville terminus of the Great Northern Railway - hence the name of the hotel.

The architects, Tunbridge & Tunbridge, designed a first class brick and timber hotel of 36 bedrooms, estimated to cost between £8,000 and £9,000. The Tunbridge brothers (Walter Howard and Oliver Allan) had entered into partnership in Townsville in 1887, and soon developed a substantial North Queensland architectural practice with offices in Charters Towers and later Rockhampton. Tunbridge and Tunbridge designed many Townsville hotels, including the Metropole (1887), Victoria Park (1896), Lowth's (1897 - demolished), Victoria Bridge (1900 - demolished), Empire (1901), Sovereign (1904) and Carriers Arms (1906 - demolished).

Although work on preparing the Blackwood Street site for the new railway terminus was underway in 1900, the station building was not erected until 1914. Despite this delay, the Great Northern Hotel proved popular with travellers from its opening. Designed and run as a first-class hotel, the Great Northern offered a high standard of service, good food, comfortable airy bedrooms and spacious public rooms. It also played a major role in the social life of the growing town. As with most early hotels in Australia, the Great Northern was a place for the community to meet and socialise, and for nearly a century the hotel has remained a popular drinking venue and prominent and well-known element of the city townscape.

On 15 May 2015 a 19-year-old Townsville man was arrested in relation to a fire at the historic Great Northern Hotel in the city. The iconic hotel suffered internal damage on the lower level. After sitting predominantly vacant over the next decade, a subsequent devastating fire occurred early on 11 September 2026, leading to significant structural damage. The building was reported to have collapsed later that afternoon as a result of the damage.

== Description ==
The Great Northern Hotel was located on a prominent corner site at the intersection of Flinders and Blackwood Streets, within an historic precinct which includes the 1914 Townsville railway station and oval lawn, garden and mature trees, the 1932 Newmarket Hotel on the opposite corner, and the vista towards Castle Hill.

The Great Northern Hotel was a substantial two-storeyed, L-shaped brick building with facades to Flinders and Blackwood Streets. It has a corrugated-iron roof, hidden behind a parapet decorated with classical motifs. Wide verandahs with bullnose roofing, cast-iron balustrading and friezes and a wooden valance on the lower level, adorn both street frontages. The timber verandah posts on the ground floor are decorated with fluted columns and capitals, and leadlight glass is a feature of the street level windows.

Internally the building remained largely intact, despite some refurbishment of the Flinders Street wing of the ground floor, which contains the public bars. At this eastern end part of the ground floor had been converted into two shops and one has been reconstructed to form part of a second bar area. The main entrance doors in the Flinders Street wing had been replaced with aluminium and the bars refurbished.

The main door of the hotel addressed Blackwood Street, closest to the railway station and leading to the reception, dining and accommodation areas of the hotel. This entrance retained its original timber joinery and sidelights and opens into a foyer with the original timber dado panelling. To the left of this foyer was the original office and office furniture. The former dining room to the right has been converted into a reception room and a new dining room opened in a room through the leadlight doors at the back of the foyer. The main internal staircase, rising from the Blackwood Street foyer, had well- crafted turned timber balusters and above the landing is a feature window with early leadlight central panes.

Upstairs, there had been little alteration to the fabric of the building. The ceilings and most of the bedroom partition walls were the original tongue and groove boarding (horizontally-jointed on the walls). Many of the original fretwork panels above the internal doors survived, while others have been replaced with glass or timber. The upstairs rooms are accessed from a T-shaped hallway with decorative masonry archways at regular intervals, and each bedroom has French doors opening onto front or rear verandahs.

Great Northern Hotel was listed on the Queensland Heritage Register on 21 October 1992, having satisfied the relevant criteria.
