= Bishop's Lodge, Townsville =

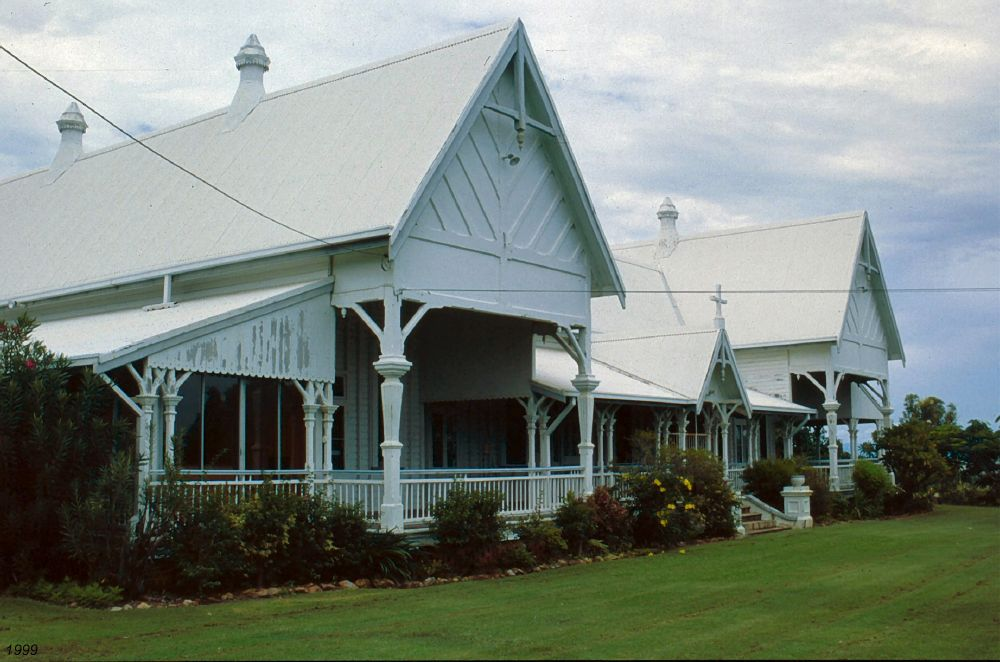
- Bishop's Lodge, 2006

- Location within Queensland Location within Australia
- 19.2479°S 146.7949°E
- Location: 13 St James Drive, Belgian Gardens, City of Townsville, Queensland, Australia

History
- Design period: 1870s–1890s (late 19th century)
- Built: 1897

Site notes
- Architect: Tunbridge & Tunbridge

Queensland Heritage Register
- Official name: Bishop's Lodge
- Type: state heritage (built, landscape)
- Designated: 21 October 1992
- Reference no.: 600883
- Significant period: 1890s–1900s (fabric); 1890s– (historical, social)
- Significant components: kitchen/kitchen house, residential accommodation – bishop's house, views to, views from, breezeway, terracing, garden/grounds

Bishop's Lodge is a heritage-listed house at 13 St James Drive, Belgian Gardens, City of Townsville, Queensland, Australia. It was designed by Tunbridge & Tunbridge and built in 1897. It was added to the Queensland Heritage Register on 21 October 1992.

== History ==
The Bishop's Lodge was constructed in 1897 to the design of Tunbridge & Tunbridge, an important Townsville architectural firm, as the residence of the Anglican Bishops of North Queensland, which it remained until the early 2000s.

Townsville was established in November, 1864 by partners John Melton Black and Robert Towns and was gazetted as a port of entry in 1865. It grew quickly as a supply centre and by 1873 the port was receiving international as well as coastal traffic. By 1880 Townsville was the port for several major goldfields and had opened the first stage of the Great Northern railway line westwards through Charters Towers and beyond, consolidating its importance as a port and mercantile centre.

Townsville was at first part of the Diocese of New South Wales. Although it is not known when the first Church of England services were held in the township, it is known that the first services were conducted in the Court House, which was built by March 1866. A Reverend Searle visited intermittently from Bowen and requested the appointment of an incumbent to the parish of Townsville. This was accepted by the Reverend James Adams. On 24 December 1872, land for a church was purchased at the foot of Melton Hill by trustees James Gordon, Frederick Walker and William Aplin and St James Church was constructed with a vicarage beside it. The church was opened on 1 October By 1877 a school, St James English Church School, was in operation and in 1878 the Diocese of North Queensland was created, with the new bishop, George Henry Stanton, based in Townsville. There were 2 other Anglican churches, St Peter's at West End and St John's at South Townsville. In 1883 Bishop Stanton selected land in the suburb of German Gardens (later renamed Belgian Gardens due to anti-German sentiment in World War I) for a bishop's residence. About the same time a movement began to erect St James Cathedral and the first stage of this was constructed between 1887 and 1892.

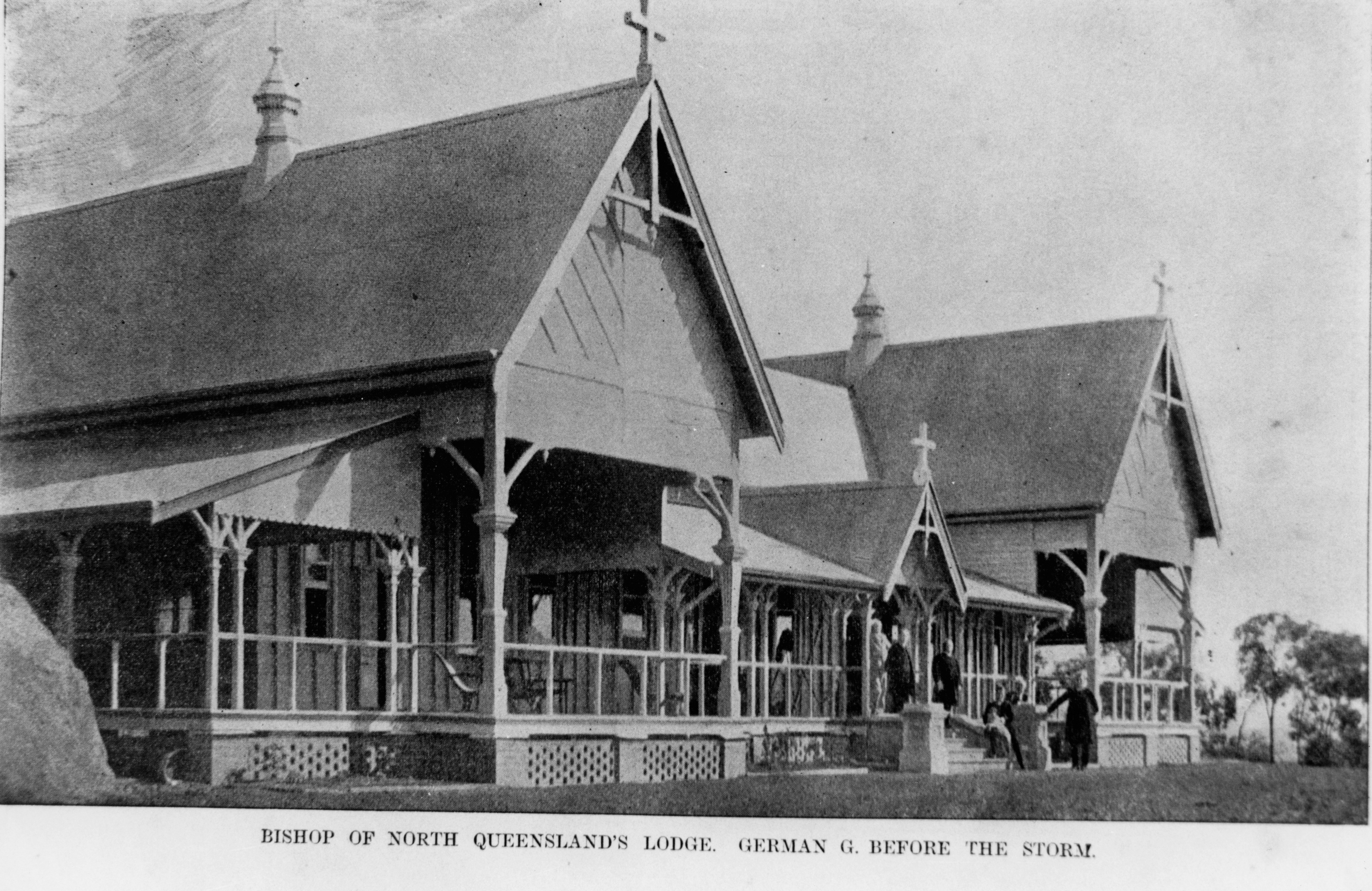
Bishop's Lodge, 1903 (before Cyclone Leonta damaged it)

Presumably because the building of the cathedral took precedence, the bishop's residence was not begun until the next bishop, Christopher Barlow, was installed, having arrived in 1891. The lodge was constructed in 1897 to the design of the well known Townsville architectural firm of Tunbridge and Tunbridge. Walter Howard Tunbridge was born and trained as an architect in England. In 1884 he migrated to Australia and worked for Rooney Bros in Townsville. He left to establish his own practice in 1886 and invited his younger brother, Oliver, to join him in 1887, founding the partnership of Tunbridge and Tunbridge, who were to become an important architectural and civil engineering firm in North Queensland.

Of the bishops who have resided at the Lodge, John Oliver Feetham is particularly well known, partly because of his 35 years in office. Feetham was an attractive and eccentric personality, born in England in 1873 as the son of a vicar. Intelligent and well-educated himself, he took an interest in the provision of education which was to be a focus for much of his work in North Queensland. Before becoming ordained, he carried out a lay ministry for 18 months in the slums of London, an influence that remained with him for life. Feetham came to Australia in 1904 as a principal of the Brotherhood of the Good Shepherd. A strong belief in the value of the work being done by the Brotherhood to spread religion in the outback and a care for its people were distinctive marks of his episcopate. He was unanimously elected to the See in 1912.

Feetham died in his bed on the verandah of the Bishop's Lodge on 14 September 1947. In the 1960s he was designated by the Synod of the Diocese of North Queensland for liturgical commemoration and styled "Blessed John Oliver Feetham". In the 1970s a memorial chapel was established on the verandah where he died.

The Lodge, like many buildings in Townsville, has suffered damage from cyclones, notably in Cyclone Leonta in 1903 and Cyclone Althea in 1971, followed by extensive repair work. In the 1970s a bathroom was added on the south west verandah and the Feetham chapel was created on the north east verandah by glassing in this area. This has preserved a view across Cleveland Bay seen beyond the altar of the chapel.

During the 1970s, a considerable portion of the Lodge's land was subdivided. The house is now privately owned, being bought from the Anglican church in the early 2000s.

== Description ==
The Bishop's Lodge is a large timber building situated on an exposed northerly ridge of Castle Hill.The Lodge is visible from the surrounding suburb and from the sea. The house overlooks Cleveland Bay towards Magnetic Island from its verandah.

The design of the house blends Victorian Gothic and vernacular architecture. It has wide verandahs surrounding it. A terrace at the front of the house has a lawn with trees and flowering shrubs.

Bishop's Lodge is symmetrical and roughly U-shaped in plan, enclosing a courtyard at the rear. It is set on low stumps and has steeply pitched gabled roofs clad in corrugated iron and topped with large decorative ventilators. In form it consists of two large wings parallel to each other and linked by a transverse section at the front. A wide passage through the centre of the building serves as a breezeway linking the front and rear verandahs, and effectively divides the house into two parts, with bedrooms on one side and living areas on the other.

The front elevation is dominated by the ends of the high twin gables. These extend across the verandah and are supported by decorative bracketed posts, creating two bays between which the central section runs. This has a lower roofline and a single ventilator in the centre of the ridge. At the centre of this section is a small gable forming an entrance porch. All three gables are decorated with timber bands placed to resemble half timbering. The central gable is surmounted by a cross.

The verandahs at the sides and centre front are also supported decorated timber posts and those at the front corners of the building have clusters of bracketed posts. The verandah balustrades are composed of wooden dowels. A modern metal security gate has been installed in the front porch.

The courtyard area has been developed as a covered greenhouse linked to the wide verandahs around the courtyard. Attached to the house by a covered way is a separate timber building, also with exterior studding. The building is raised on concrete stumps and has a gabled roof clad in corrugated iron.

A modern concrete garage has been constructed to the rear of the house.

== Heritage listing ==
Bishop's Lodge was listed on the Queensland Heritage Register on 21 October 1992 having satisfied the following criteria.

The place is important in demonstrating the evolution or pattern of Queensland's history.

The Bishop's Lodge, as the first and subsequent, purpose-built, residence for the Anglican Bishop of North Queensland, is important in demonstrating the pattern of establishment and growth of the Anglican Church in North Queensland in the late 19th century.

The place is important because of its aesthetic significance.

The Lodge has aesthetic value as an example of a high quality, detailed and fashionable residence of its era and was designed by one of North Queensland 's leading architectural firms.

The place has a strong or special association with a particular community or cultural group for social, cultural or spiritual reasons.

The Bishop's Lodge is closely associated with the life and work of the Blessed John Oliver Feetham, Anglican Bishop of North Queensland 1913–47. It is also associated with the important North Queensland architectural firm of Tunbridge and Tunbridge.
