= Cluden Racecourse =

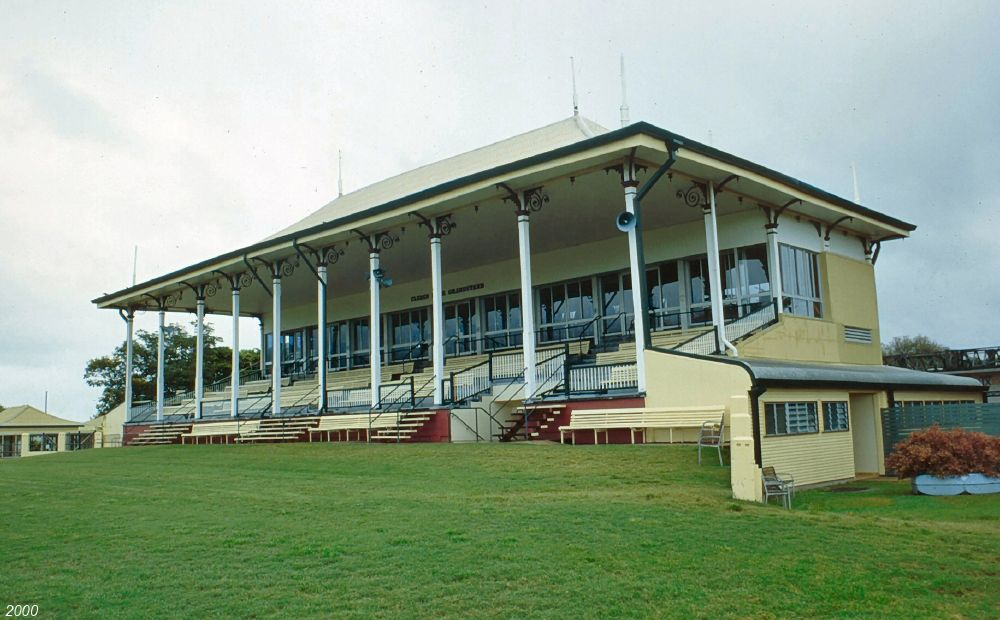
- Grandstand, Cluden Racecourse, 2000

- Location within Queensland Location within Australia
- 19.322°S 146.8208°E
- Location: 1 Racecourse Road, Cluden, City of Townsville, Queensland, Australia

History
- Design period: 1870s - 1890s (late 19th century)
- Built: 1896 - 1983

Site notes
- Architect: Walter Howard Tunbridge

Queensland Heritage Register
- Official name: Grandstand, former totalisator building and main entrance gates, Cluden Racecourse, Cluden Racecourse
- Type: state heritage (built)
- Designated: 21 October 1992
- Reference no.: 600924
- Significant period: 1896, 1923, 1927, 1972, 1983 (fabric); 1940s (historical); 1896- ongoing ( social)
- Significant components: grandstand, totalisator, gate - entrance
- Builders: Mr Reid

Cluden Racecourse is a heritage-listed racecourse at 1 Racecourse Road, Cluden, City of Townsville, Queensland, Australia. It was designed by Walter Howard Tunbridge and built in 1896 by Mr Reid. It was added to the Queensland Heritage Register on 21 October 1992.

== History ==
Townsville was founded in 1864 by partners John Melton Black and Robert Towns as a port and commercial centre for the pastoral industry north of the Burdekin. The Port of Townsville was gazetted as a port of entry in 1865 and grew quickly. The first sporting institution formed was the Burdekin and Flinders Turf Club in May 1866. The patron was the Governor of Queensland, Sir George Ferguson Bowen, who supported horse racing as a means of improving breeding and with an eye to the development of a Queensland cavalry. The inaugural president was Robert Towns. The first race meeting was a three-day event held in mid-August 1866 with substantial prizes being offered. Early meetings were held in several locations, including Cleveland Park in the Garbutt area and Hermit Park. In 1874 the government granted the club a reserve for a racecourse and the name was changed about this time to the Townsville Turf Club, which name it has retained. Work soon began on a proper track on a reserve of 64 acres (26 ha) on the Dalrymple Road.

The discovery of gold gave great impetus to the development of Townsville and by 1880 it was serving several major goldfields in the north. The Great Northern railway was proposed to link Townsville with the important goldfield at Charters Towers in the late 1870s. The line from Townsville opened to Mingela in late 1881 and to Charters Towers in December 1882. Dr Frost and Mr A.H. Rourke of the Townsville Turf Club proposed a change of site for the course so that advantage could be taken of this rail service. Cluden Park had been established on the south side of Ross River in the early years of settlement and was about three miles from Townsville by rail. The site selected for the new course was only a few minutes walk from the Cluden railway station. A race track was cleared and marked out and a temporary stand erected for the first meeting. In spite of reservations about the move from members and patrons, the improved accessibility of the new course made it successful from the start. Improvements consisting of a grandstand, stewards and press stand, booths and totalisator were constructed in 1883 at a cost of £2500.

On January 26, 1896 Cyclone Sigma swept through Townsville, causing considerable damage. At Cluden railway station, the rails were six feet under water and the racecourse buildings were devastated. The grandstand had collapsed and the stables, training sheds and a number of local houses had been swept away. The Annual Townsville Turf Club Race Meeting was scheduled for 14 July and the committee decided that it would attempt to rebuild the course in time for this. Although Tunbridge & Tunbridge, as a major architectural firm in the city, was inundated with work at this time, Walter Howard Tunbridge designed a new set of buildings for the course. They consisted of a grandstand to seat 700 with a lunchroom beneath at a cost of £1600, plus a totalisator building, judge's box, gates and stables. The existing damaged grandstand was recycled with more comfortable seating as a St Leger stand, which has since been removed. The whole project was estimated to cost over £2000. Thanks to strenuous efforts on the part of the architect, the club secretary, Mr James Simpson Love, and the contractor, Mr Reid, the new amenities were ready for use on time, although the final details, like painting, had to wait until after the meeting.

This was an immense success with 923 people arriving by rail alone. £370 was taken at the gate and £8107 at the totalisator over the two days, setting a new record. Prize money totalled £840. The new facilities, especially the grandstand and the well-ventilated and commodious lunch room and bar underneath it were much appreciated by the public and highly praised in the press. Even "Feminine" who provided social notes for the North Queensland Herald, commented approvingly on the wide aisles and more spacious seating, because "in this age of large sleeves and full skirts, we require rather more than elbow room"; an interesting comment in the light of the opinion of the racing press that levels of female attendance had a strong effect on the success or otherwise of a race meeting.

A totalisator was constructed to the rear of the grandstand and the building is still present, though now used as offices. The totalisator system has been in use since the 1860s, though the earliest system, the Pari-Mutuel, was cumbersome and expensive, needing a large number of clerks to make the necessary calculations. The system works on the principle of totalling the bets made on a particular race and then dividing this sum, less a percentage for the operator, amongst those selecting the winning horse in proportion to the amount of their wager. Bets are registered and dividends displayed on a special board. In 1887 a partially automated system was in use in Australia and may have been in use at Cluden, there having been a totalisator on the course before the 1896 rebuild. A Totalisator Tax Act was introduced in 1892 in which the government deducted sixpence in the pound of stake receipts. In 1913 an Australian, George (later Sir) Julius, invented a fully automated system which was introduced at Randwick in September 1917 and was soon widely in use in Australia and overseas.

By the next meeting of the Townsville Turf Club, work had been completed on the new buildings and the grandstand roof was painted in broad stripes and topped with flagpoles at each end of the ridge and roof corners, giving the building a distinctly carnival air. Similar stripes were also applied to the shallow concave roof lines of the totalisator building and two sets of entrance gates. A lower tier of seating, which was not undercover, was originally at the front of the grandstand, but seems to have been removed at an early stage in favour of a sloping lawn.

Major repairs were needed to the grandstand following Cyclone Leonta which struck Townsville with devastating effect in 1903 and a new members bar was added in 1923 by Charles Venden Rees. He also added a new stewards' stand and such improvements as new lavatories to the grandstand in 1927.

During the Second World War, the racecourse was used as a military camp by the Australian Army. However, the commanding officer understood the value of the races to the morale of the troops and public and so the whole troop concentration moved out every Saturday so that the races could be held.

After Cyclone Althea in 1972 repairs were again needed and a toilet block and car park were added at this time. In 1983, a substantial upgrade of facilities was carried out by architects Martin Dillon and Associates. New toilets and drink serving areas were provided to the ground floor of the grandstand and new totalisator facilities, a glassed-in viewing area and catering facilities on the first floor. The roof sheeting was replaced, but the original seating was retained and materials were chosen to be sympathetic to the structure. Additional covered areas and a kiosk replaced sheds adjacent to the grandstand at this time. The refurbished facilities were opened in 1984 by the Minister for Racing.

== Description ==
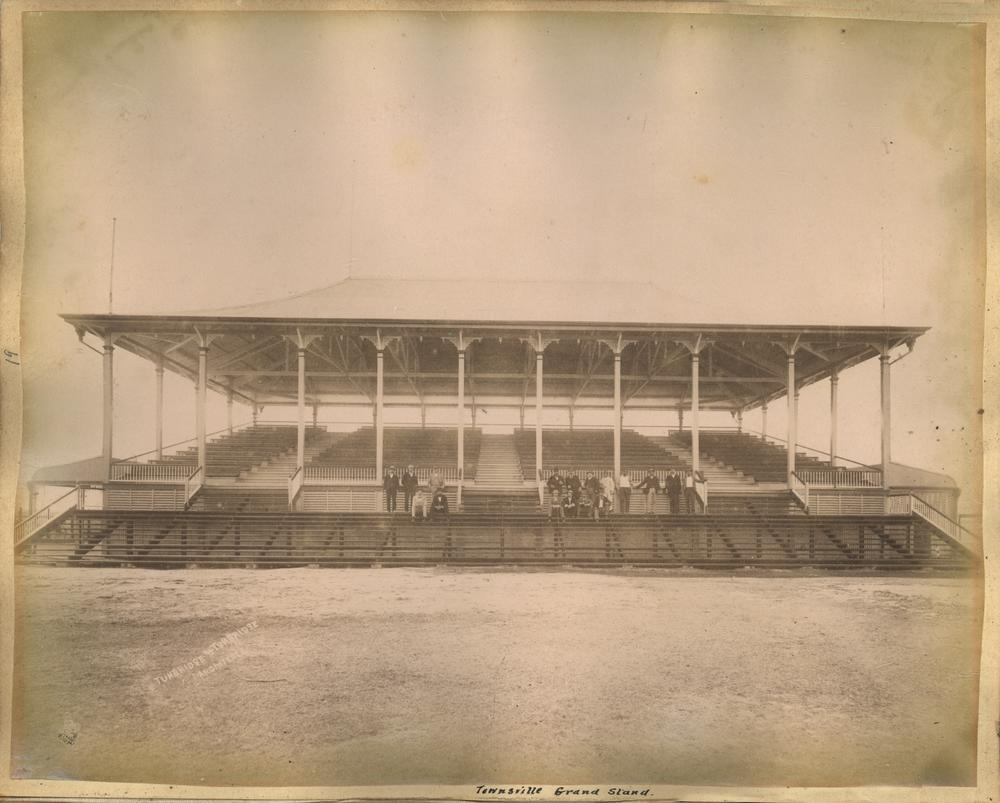
Grandstand, circa 1895

The three buildings which form components of Tunbridge's suite of buildings for the site have generally retained their character and much of their original form.

In spite of upgrades to facilities made over the years and repairs following at least two cyclones, the grandstand has retained its character and has a continuity of usage. Its appearance has not changed greatly since opening, although a large section at the back has been glassed in, diminishing its original airy, pavilion-like appearance. It still has flagpoles at ridge and roof corners. It has a hipped roof with a concave profile clad in corrugated iron and supported on timber posts with cast iron brackets between the posts. Brackets to the interior are formed from wrought iron into tendril-like spirals. The seating is tiered and the original slatted timber seats remain. Beneath the grandstand are refreshment and bar facilities. These are now modern, but reflect the original type of facilities, if not their form.

The totalisator is a timber-framed building clad with weatherboard and fibro set behind and to one side of the grandstand and can be clearly recognised from early photographs. It is a narrow T-shape in plan, with a two-storey hip roofed section set at right angles to a single storey gable roofed section. The roofs of both are clad with corrugated iron of the same profile as the grandstand and the hipped roof retains finials at each end of its ridge pole, though the flagpole at the end of the single storey gable has gone.

A wide verandah with a concave corrugated iron roof supported on timber posts surrounds the building and has been partially built in on two sides. This verandah is not shown on early pictures, though its date is unknown. Skylights have been added to the single storey roof on one side. The building has been used as offices for some time and the interior was not inspected.

One of the 1896 entrance gates remains as the main entrance to the course. It is timber and consists of a pair of ticket offices on either side of an entry and turnstiles. The whole is spanned by a corrugated iron roof matching that of the other Tunbridge buildings on site. This has retained its flagpoles and traces of a red and white striped paint scheme. The outer side has the words "Townsville Turf Club" over the entrance and each ticket office has two grilled windows to the street and a door to the rear. The entrance when closed is protected by a modern security screen of vertical metal rods.

== Heritage listing ==
The grandstand, former totalisator building and main entrance gates at Cluden Racecourse were listed on the Queensland Heritage Register on 21 October 1992 having satisfied the following criteria.

The 1896 structures at Cluden racecourse in Townsville illustrate the importance of horse racing in Queensland, which was the earliest organised sport in the colony and was the first sporting institution in Townsville. In the nineteenth century, horses were the main form of transport and were used in warfare, police work and many industries. Racing them was thought to improve the general quality of the breed as well as being an entertainment and was officially encouraged. The breeding, training and racing of horses has been important in Queensland as an industry in its own right and the quality of facilities on an early racecourse such as Cluden demonstrates this.

The grandstand is an excellent example of its kind, and its visual appeal and amenities were widely praised when it was constructed. Together with the totalisator building and entrance gates, it forms part of a group of original public racecourse buildings at one of the most important courses in the state.

These buildings were designed by Walter Howard Tunbridge, one of North Queensland's most notable architects, and the aesthetic qualities of the grandstand in particular have been generally admired by the public. It has a light, airy quality less evident in grandstands in the Southern states.

The structures are important for their association with the Townsville Turf Club, the first sporting institution in Townsville and one of the oldest in the state. The buildings, in spite of assaults by the cyclones which are part of the region's weather patterns, have survived in regular use on this important course for over a hundred years.

The grandstand, totalisator building and gates are major works of the important North Queensland architectural firm of Tunbridge and Tunbridge, especially Walter Howard Tunbridge, who did the actual design.
