= St John's Anglican Church, South Townsville =

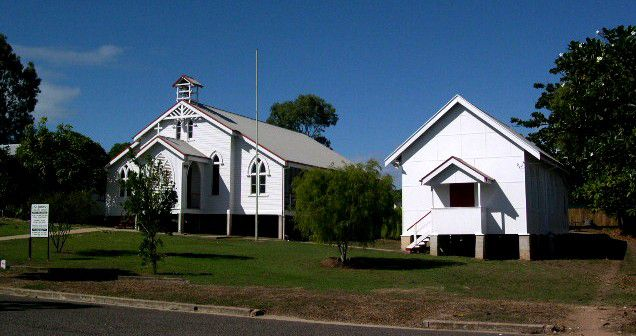
- St John's Church & Hall, 2003

- Location within Queensland
- 19.2634°S 146.828°E
- Location: 30–34 Macrossan Street, South Townsville, City of Townsville, Queensland, Australia

History
- Design period: 1900–1914 (early 20th century)
- Built: c. 1907–c. 1911

Queensland Heritage Register
- Official name: St John's Anglican Church Precinct
- Type: state heritage (landscape, built)
- Designated: 21 October 1992
- Reference no.: 600880
- Significant period: 1900s–1910s (historical)
- Significant components: views to, trees/plantings, church, church hall/sunday school hall, residential accommodation – rectory

St John's Anglican Church Precinct is a heritage-listed churchyard at 30–34 Macrossan Street, South Townsville, City of Townsville, Queensland, Australia. It was built from c. 1907 to c. 1911. It was added to the Queensland Heritage Register on 21 October 1992.

== History ==
St John's Anglican Precinct at South Townsville comprises a small timber church constructed in 1907; a timber rectory constructed c. 1907; and a small timber and fibrous-cement sheeted church hall. St John's Church is the third church erected on this site, replacing an 1898 church destroyed in 1903 by Cyclone Leonta, which in turn had replaced an 1884 church destroyed by Cyclone Sigma in 1896. The rectory also is the third residence on the site, replacing vicarages destroyed in the 1896 and 1903 cyclones. These buildings remain amongst the earliest surviving Anglican church buildings in the Diocese of North Queensland.

Townsville was established in the mid-1860s as a port to service new pastoral runs being taken up in the Kennedy District. The town centre developed along the north west bank of Ross Creek, while suburban settlement spread to the north along the beach front, to the west along what later became known as Ingham Road and south across the creek to Ross Island. The discovery of gold at Cape River in 1867 and the boom in the pastoral industry consolidated Townsville's position as a port and administrative and commercial centre during the 1870s. The port expanded and rail facilities were established in 1881 with the construction of the Great Northern Railway from Townsville to Charters Towers and later to Hughenden further west.

The Church of England early established a presence in Townsville and opened St James' Church in 1871. At this time the district was part of the Diocese of Sydney. The Diocese of North Queensland was formed in 1878, when North Queensland's mineral fields and grazing industry were flourishing. The Rev. George Henry Stanton was consecrated the first Bishop of the new Diocese, arriving in Townsville in May 1879 and establishing his seat at St James' Church (which became the pro-Cathedral). Stanton proved very popular and was adept at attracting overseas funding for the new Diocese. As Townsville expanded during the early 1880s, he assisted his parishioners to establish new churches at West End in 1883 (opened as St James' Mission Church and renamed St Peter's in 1884) and at Ross Island (St John's) in 1884.

Ross Island was a focus for settlement as early as 1868 when the first Townsville hospital was constructed on the island. By the mid-1870s a thriving suburb had been established, with Palmer Street the commercial centre. In 1883 the island was officially surveyed, excised from Thuringowa Division and incorporated into the Municipality of Townsville as South Townsville. To serve the burgeoning population, the South Townsville State School was opened in February 1884.

Prior to the construction of St John's, occasional Anglican services had been conducted at the immigration depot on Ross Island. At the first sale of Ross Island subdivisions in May 1883 Bishop Stanton acquired two adjacent allotments in Macrossan Street for church purposes (allotments 6 & 7, section 161, comprising half an acre in total and directly opposite the school reserve). In June 1884 title to the land was transferred from Bishop Stanton to The Corporation of the Diocesan Synod of North Queensland, which had been established in June 1883 for the purpose of acquiring and managing church property for the Diocese.

In August 1884 the first St John's Church was dedicated on this site. At this period the new church was part of the parish of Townsville and was administered from St James' pro-Cathedral. The Townsville Herald of 24 December 1887 described the building as "a pretty little church" and "well patronised".

Ross Creek boomed during the second half of the 1880s. In 1885–86 the Great Northern Railway was extended east into South Townsville and the Ross Island jetty was extended into deeper water to facilitate the shipment of station produce from the far west of Queensland. The Victoria Bridge opened in July 1889, was constructed across Ross Creek, linking the island to Townsville's central business district along Flinders Street. Wharves, railway yards, a meat works and foundries at Ross Island became major employers and the surrounding district developed as a working class residential suburb. By the late 1880s it was the fastest growing area in Townsville.

In 1889 Ross Island was declared a parochial district within the Diocese of North Queensland, with the Rev. L Ketchlee as the priest-in-charge. It is likely that the first St John's vicarage was erected at this time.

In January 1896 Cyclone Sigma destroyed St John's Church and Vicarage at Ross Island. A contemporary report estimated the loss at about £600. A second St John's Church was opened in 1898, constructed at a cost of £450.

In May 1901 the Diocesan Synod acquired title to an adjacent allotment in Macrossan Street (allotment 5, section 161). This is the site of the later church hall. It may have contained an existing residence acquired for use as a vicarage.

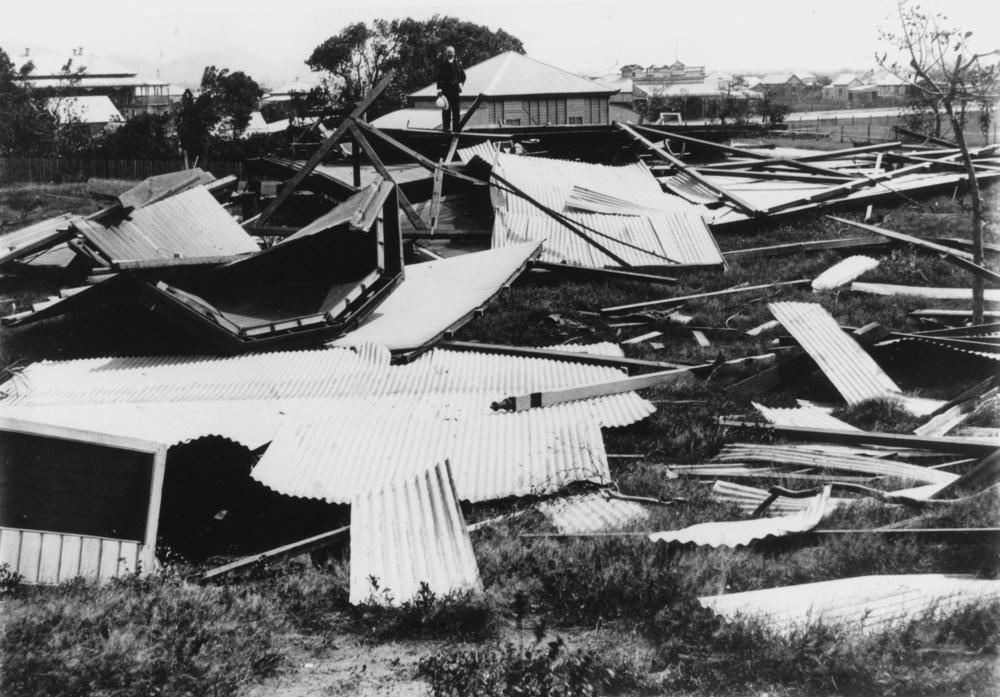
Remains of St.John's Church, destroyed by Cyclone Leonta, 1903

On 9 March 1903 Cyclone Leonta destroyed the second St John's Church of England and Vicarage at Ross Island. Photographs of the site taken shortly afterwards show a pile of tangled timbers and iron roofing. The local press reported that the church furniture had been saved through the efforts of the incumbent priest, the Rev. Goodchild.

Cyclone Leonta had struck at a time when the Diocese of North Queensland was in severe financial difficulty, arising from the impact of the early 1890s economic depression and the closure of many Queensland banks, closures of many gold and tin mines and a fall in world copper prices in the 1890s, and a severe drought 1898–1902. Diocesan architects and civil engineers Tunbridge and Tunbridge of Townsville, engaged to report on the cyclone devastation, estimated that £2,600 worth of damage to Diocesan property had been sustained in Townsville alone and £6,250 throughout the Diocese. Bishop George Frodsham, then Bishop of North Queensland, travelled overseas to raise funds to save his Diocese and by May 1905 over £6,000 had been subscribed from various diocese in Britain, New Zealand, Australia, Japan and Hong Kong; from British church societies; and from individuals.

Ross Island was a working class district and had suffered substantially during Cyclone Leonta, with many homes reportedly destroyed or unroofed. It took the parish nearly four years to replace their church, with the third and present St John's Church of England dedicated on 17 February 1907. The third St John's Church was designed by architect Charles Dalton Lynch, the Townsville partner in the architectural firm of Tunbridge, Tunbridge and Lynch from 1907 to 1910 and in partnership with Walter Hunt from 1911 to 1921. Lynch was a noted and influential architect, who designed many buildings in North Queensland, including several of Cairns' most prominent buildings: Cairns School of Arts and Harbour Board Offices (1907), new Court House Hotel (1908) and Central Hotel (Central Court) (1909). Works by Lunch & Hunt include Agora House in Townsville for Howard Smith & Co. Ltd (1910–11), Mulgrave Shire Council Chambers in Cairns (1912–13) and St Joseph's Church, North Ward, (1920–21).

Lynch addressed the problem of cross ventilation in a tropical climate by providing St John's with large sliding doors along each side of the nave, which were sheltered by open verandahs and when opened allowed air to circulate freely through the building. The use of banks of side doors was a popular ventilation device of the period employed in large auditoria such as public halls and theatres, but was less commonly used in church buildings.

The third St John's vicarage may have been erected around this time, and evidently by 1911. St John's Church Hall is suspected to date to this period.

Ross Island (South Townsville) remained a vibrant working class community until port facilities began to move closer to the harbour mouth in the second half of the 20th century. By 1958 the population in the parish of South Townsville had reached 4,000.

St John's Church and Rectory were entered in the Register of the National Trust of Queensland in May 1980 for their historical and architectural interest. Regular Sunday services are still held at the church.

== Description ==
St John's Church, Church Hall and Rectory are located on the southeast side of Macrossan Street, South Townsville, between Allen and Cannan streets, opposite the South Townsville State School. The district is suburban residential in character.

=== St John's Church (1907) ===
St John's Church is located in the centre of the church property in Macrossan Street, flanked by the rectory to the northeast and the church hall to the southwest. It is a simple but aesthetically pleasing timber building which employs Gothic stylistic detailing along with accommodation for Townsville's warm sub-tropical climate.

The building is rectangular in plan with the central front bay projecting slightly. It is high set on concrete stumps, clad with chamferboards, and has a corrugated iron sheeted gabled roof that extends over verandahs along either side. A small timber belfry is located at the forward end of this roof and the front gable beneath the belfry has simple timber battening as a decorative in-fill. The side walls to the verandahs reveal exposed stud framing. The southern verandah is open for its full length and the northern verandah is enclosed at either end.

The side verandahs are supported on timber posts with decorative timber capitals and brackets and have a simple timber balustrade consisting of a top rail and two uprights in each bay. There is a small, centrally positioned front entry porch, with a separate gabled roof. Surmounting the apex of the gable is a small timber Christian cross. The porch has side openings in the form of lancet arches, which once permitted access from both sides. There is now a set of later stairs at the northern side of the porch only. The southern entrance is partially enclosed with a simple metal balustrade and the stairs have been removed. The front of the entry porch is enclosed with chamferboards and has timber louvres within a lancet arch frame for ventilation purposes. A separately-roofed extension in the rear elevation accommodates the sanctuary.

Most of the fenestration is restricted to the front and rear elevations and is in the form of lancet windows. These include pairs of windows in the front elevation that open from the side verandahs and in the gable above the entry porch. There are also single lancet windows either side of the entry porch, which light the nave and mirror those in the rear wall either side of the sanctuary.

Internally, the nave is separated from the sanctuary by a wide lancet arch. The walls along the side of the nave each have two rectangular openings enclosed by pairs of unequal timber framed and diagonally boarded sliding doors, which when opened provide cross ventilation. These openings are protected by the deep flanking side verandahs, which may be used as aisles.

The ceiling is lined in tongue and groove timber boards and the timber trusses supporting the roof are exposed. Flooring throughout is timber boarding. Significant church furniture includes early timber pews.

=== St John's Church Hall ===
St John's Church Hall is a simple timber-framed building, high set on concrete stumps and clad externally with fibrous cement sheeting and timber cover strips. It is rectangular in plan, with a gable roof of corrugated iron. Like the adjacent church, it has a small separately-roofed entrance porch, which is partially enclosed with a fibrous cement sheeted balustrade. Entrance to this porch is via timber stairs on the northeast side of the porch. There is a small, centrally-positioned, skillion-roofed extension in the rear elevation. This also is clad in fibrous-cement sheeting, but is lower set. In each side elevation there are four pairs of tri-paned stained glass casement windows.

=== St John's Rectory (c. 1907) ===
St John's Rectory is a single-storeyed building, timber-framed and timber-clad, set on low mostly timber stumps. It has a gabled roof clad in corrugated galvanized iron. The building is L-shaped in plan, with a projecting asymmetrical front gable. It has skillion-roofed verandahs to front and back, both of which are enclosed with later fibrous cement sheeting and glass and timber louvres. The southern end wall of the residence is clad externally but the northern wall and the wall of the projecting transverse gable are mostly single-skin, with exposed stud framing and chamferboards and an external cladding to the upper front gable. The windows in these walls retain their early double-hung timber-framed sashes and have window hoods, which are timber framed and sheeted in corrugated galvanised iron.

=== Grounds ===
The grounds, which slope to the southwest, are grassed and there are concrete paths connecting the church and church hall. Plantings considered to be of cultural heritage significance include an indigenous Terminalia at the south/southwest corner of the site and mature frangipani (Plumeria) trees. There is a tall metal flagpole in the front yard of the church and in the yard behind the church and hall is an area formerly levelled for a tennis court. A small, skillion-roofed, concrete block toilet block at the rear, between the hall and the church, is of later construction and is not considered to be of cultural heritage significance. Along the street alignment, partly in front of the rectory and partly in front of the church, there is an early, low concrete retaining wall and entrance steps flagged by low, square concrete columns topped with cast iron capitals. This appears to indicate an earlier configuration of buildings on the site. The remainder of the frontage has a later low retaining wall, of concrete and concrete block. The precinct has an aesthetic appeal based on the picturesque quality of the simple timber buildings in their garden setting and visually complements the school grounds across the street.

== Heritage listing ==
St John's Anglican Church Precinct was listed on the Queensland Heritage Register on 21 October 1992 having satisfied the following criteria.

The place is important in demonstrating the evolution or pattern of Queensland's history.

St John's Anglican Church Precinct is important in illustrating part of the pattern of Queensland's history, in particular the expansion of Townsville as a regional port and the growth of the working class suburb of South Townsville in the late 19th and early 20th centuries. The church and rectory remain amongst the earliest surviving Anglican church buildings in the Diocese of North Queensland.

The place is important in demonstrating the principal characteristics of a particular class of cultural places.

St John's Anglican Church is important in demonstrating the principal characteristics of its type, including the adaptation of traditional Gothic-styled timber church design to accommodate the warm North Queensland climate. The building remains highly intact and retains its original detailing (including lancet windows and arches, double sliding timber doors to the verandahs, decorative detailing to deep verandahs and early timber pews). It is an excellent example of the work of architect CD Lynch, who made a substantial contribution to North Queensland architecture in the early 20th century. St John's Anglican Church Precinct is important in demonstrating the principal characteristics of its class of cultural places: an early 20th century religious precinct. These characteristics include the grouping of church, church hall and rectory within a restricted and defined area; the intactness of the three principal buildings on the site; the consistent use of materials (principally timber, galvanized iron and fibrous-cement sheeting); and the garden setting (including an early low concrete retaining wall and entrance with low concrete columns with cast-iron capitals, along the street frontage).

The place is important because of its aesthetic significance.

St John's Anglican Church is of aesthetic significance for its use of Gothic stylistic influences within the Queensland vernacular idiom of high-set timber buildings, the result being a balanced, visually pleasing design incorporating traditional European church motifs and Queensland-style deep verandahs. St John's Anglican Church Precinct has a picturesque quality engendered from the consistency of scale, form and materials and the lineal arrangement of the group of simple timber buildings in a garden setting. The place makes an aesthetic contribution to the streetscape, visually complementing the state school across the road.

The place has a special association with the life or work of a particular person, group or organisation of importance in Queensland's history.

The place has a special association with the work of the Anglican Church in North Queensland. The fact that it contains the third St John's Church and Rectory erected on the site between 1884 and 1907 is testimony to the strength of the Anglican Church in North Queensland in the late 19th and early 20th centuries, overcoming obstacles such as distance, remoteness, climate, small population base and lack of Diocesan funds.
