= Cyclone Sigma =

1896 Australia cyclone

Meteorological history
- Formed: 25 January 1896
- Dissipated: 30 January 1896

Unknown-strength storm
- Lowest pressure: 988 hPa (mbar); 29.18 inHg

Overall effects
- Fatalities: 23 confirmed
- Missing: 3
- Part of the Pre-1900 Australian region cyclone seasons

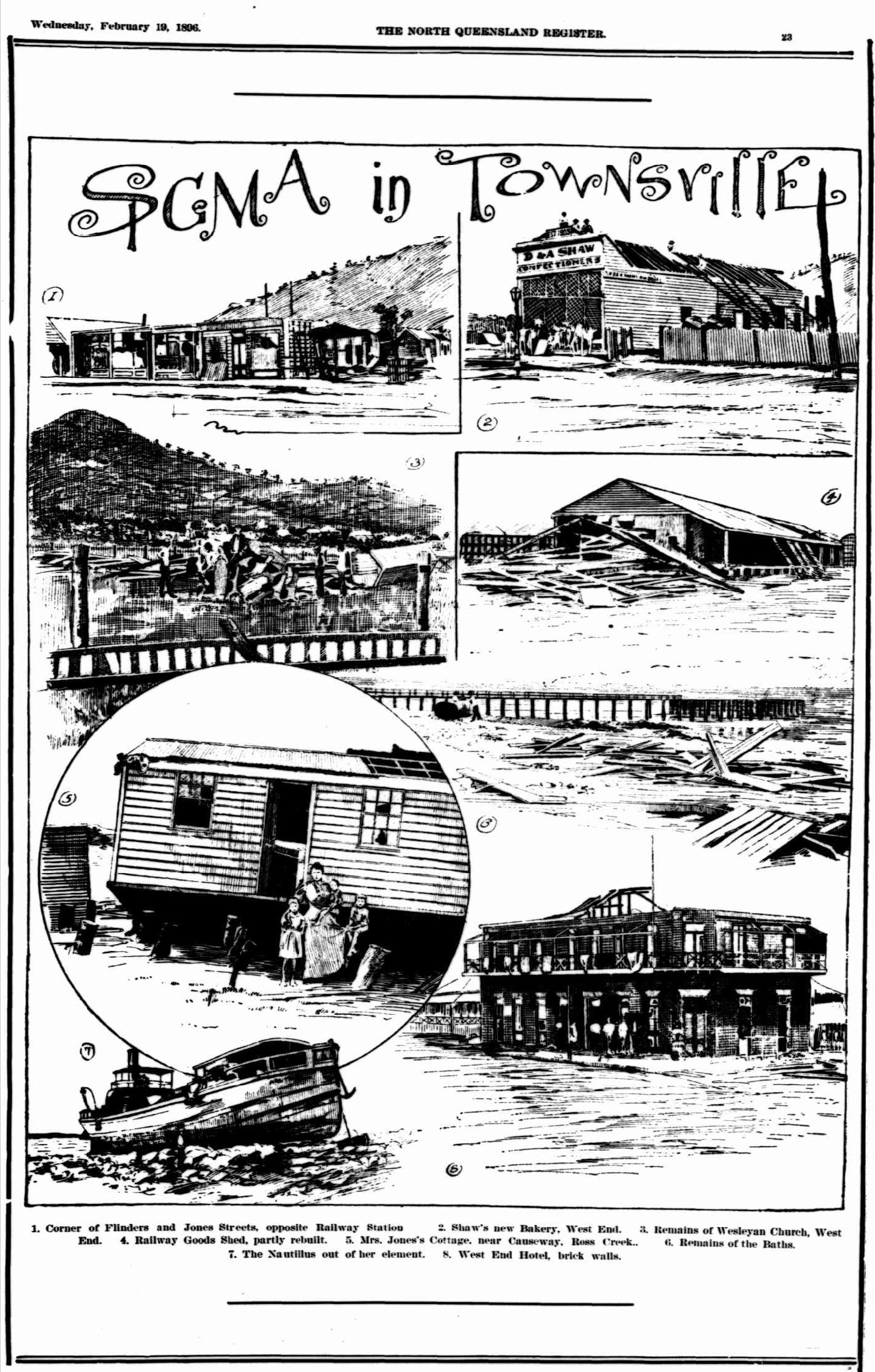
Sketches of the damage of Cyclone Sigma on Townsville, 1896

Cyclone Sigma was a deadly tropical cyclone that caused severe damage in North Queensland, Australia on 26–27 January 1896 and the loss of at least 23 lives.

The cyclone caused massive destruction to Townsville and surrounding areas. The cyclone passed to the north-east of the town, creating high seas and dumping up to 510 millimetres (20 in) of rain in the area. The Ross River broke its banks, flooding 4.8 kilometres (3 mi) of the town's suburbs with up to 2 metres (6 ft 7 in) of water. Ten ships were wrecked in the harbour, 17 people died in the flooding, and one sailor was also killed.

The cyclone then travelled south towards Rockhampton, creating heavy rainfall. At least 23 people died in the cyclone, with three reported as missing.

It was thought that ketch Lalla Rookh was wrecked during the cyclone; however, later reports confirmed that she had escaped.

Many buildings were destroyed or badly damaged, including:

- Townsville School of Arts
- Tattersalls Hotel
- Townsville Showground
- Townsville Supreme Court
- St John's Anglican Church
- Cluden Racecourse and railway station
