= Queensland Citizen Bushmen =

- Active: 1900–1901
- Country: Queensland
- Allegiance: British Empire
- Type: Mounted Infantry
- Size: 316 men ~ 2–3 squadrons
- Engagements: Second Boer War

Commanders
- Current commander: Walter Tunbridge

The Queensland Citizen Bushmen, also known as the 3rd Queensland Mounted Infantry, was a mounted infantry regiment raised in Queensland for service during the Second Boer War. Formed as part of the third Queensland contingent with an original strength of 316 men, it departed for South Africa on 2 March 1900 aboard the Duke of Portland. Under the command of Major Walter Tunbridge, it initially served in Rhodesia, and later in west Transvaal, where it took part in the Relief of Mafeking, and actions at Koster River and Elands River. It then served in northern Transvaal, including actions at Rhenoster Kop and Wolwekuil, and the advance on Pietersburg. Fatal casualties included three men killed or died of wounds, and five dead from disease. The unit returned to Australia in June 1901 on the Morayshire.
