= Tunbridge & Tunbridge =

Tunbridge & Tunbridge was a prominent architectural firm in North Queensland, Australia. It was founded by architect and serviceman Walter Howard Tunbridge CB, CMG, CBE, VD with his younger brother Oliver Allan Tunbridge joining him in Townsville in 1887.

Architect Charles Dalton Lynch joined the firm in 1899, becoming partner in 1902. The firm was known as Tunbridge, Tunbridge & Lynch for a time. A number of their works are now heritage-listed.

== History ==
Walter Tunbridge was born and trained in England as an architect. In 1884 he migrated to Australia and worked for Rooney Brothers in Townsville. He left to establish his own practice in 1886 and invited his younger brother, Oliver, to join him in 1887. This partnership subsequently became an important architectural and civil engineering firm in North Queensland, eventually establishing offices across Townsville, Cairns, Charters Towers and eventually Rockhampton.

W.H Tunbrdige returned to Townsville from the Second Boer War in 1901, by which time his brother had left the business for a Military Career. Charles Dalton Lynch joined as partner in approximately 1902.

W.H. Tunbridge married Brisbane woman Leila Brown in 1904, relocating to Melbourne and establishing another branch of Tunbridge & Tunbridge in Victoria. He had two unsuccessful attempts to represent North Queensland in Federal politics as the National Liberal Union Candidate for the Queensland Senate in 1903, and again as the Free Trade Party's candidate for the Federal seat of Herbert in 1906 - losing both in tight contests. The firm continued to be active in Melbourne until 1914.

In 1909, Lynch announced that he had been a solo practitioner for some time and that firm's name would be C.D. Lynch. From 1911 onwards, Lynch joined Walter Hunt at a separate firm in Townsville until August 1921.

After serving as the aide-de-camp to the Governor-General, returning to the military for World War I, and undertaking post-war Military roles in London, France and Belgium in the late 1910's, W.H. Tunbridge returned to Australia around 1920 and retired from architecture in the 1930's.

== Legacy ==
A large amount of federation-style Heritage-listed pubs and restaurants remain, particularly across South Townsville and Townsville's CBD. As a result, the Walter and Oliver Tunbridge Award for Building of the Year is awarded annually by the Australian Institute of Architects for Queensland based submissions.

== Significant works ==
- Victoria Park Hotel
- Great Northern Hotel, Townsville
- Commonwealth Hotel, Townsville
- Metropole Hotel, Townsville
- Buchanan's Hotel, Townsville
- Victoria Bridge Hotel, Townsville
- Queen's Building, Townsville
- Empire Hotel, Townsville
- Townsville Showground Grandstand
- Bishop's Lodge, North Ward
- St John's Anglican Church
- Central Court, Cairns
- Cairns School of Arts
- Thornburgh House, Charters Towers
- St Margaret's Church of England, Croydon
- Bank Place Chambers (Whitehall), Melbourne
