= South Townsville, Queensland =

South Townsville
- Suburb
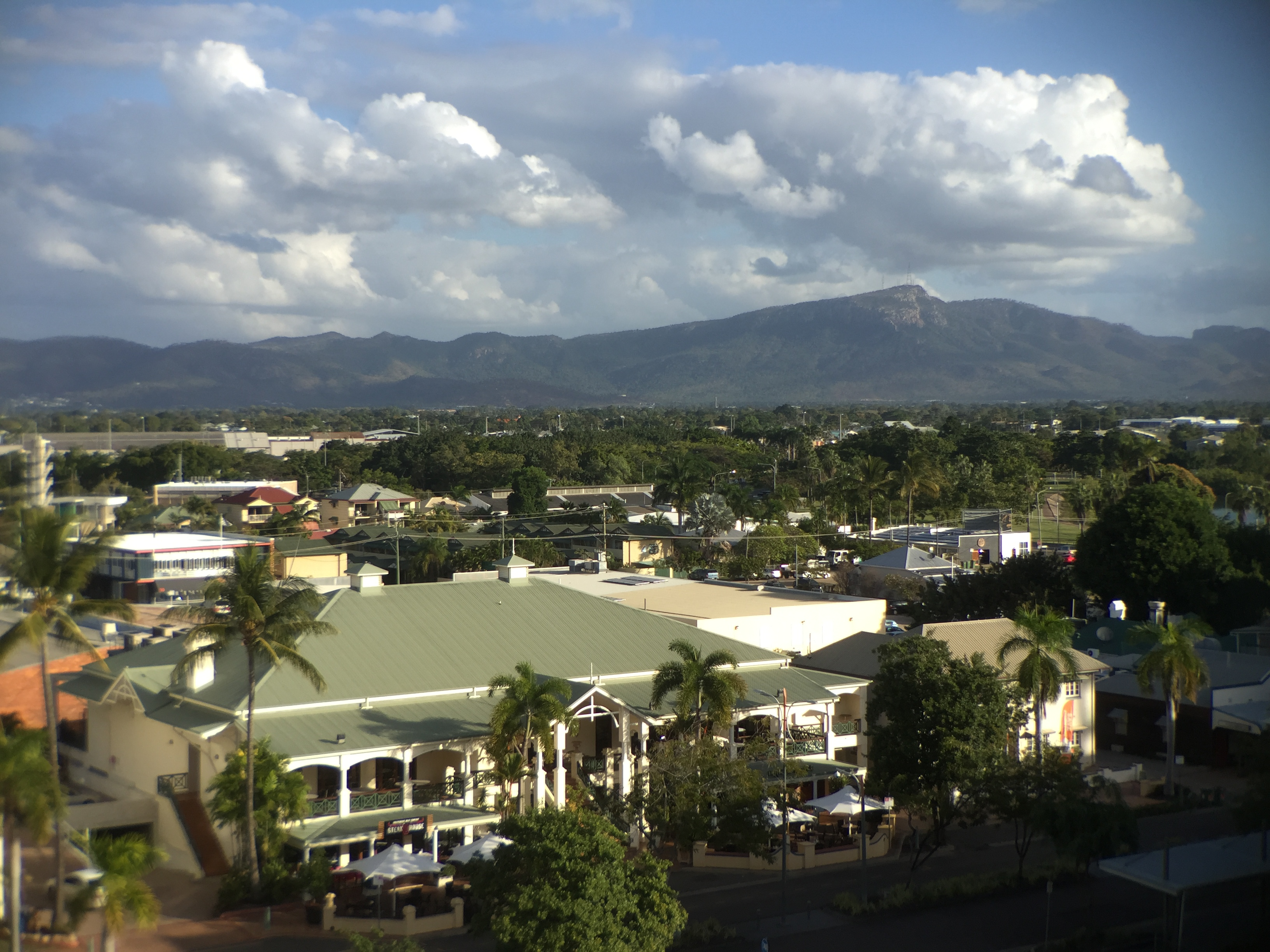
- South Townsville, 2016

- Interactive map of South Townsville
- Coordinates: 19.2602°S 146.8308°E
- Country: Australia
- State: Queensland
- City: Townsville
- LGA: City of Townsville
- Location: 2.0 km (1.2 mi) SE of Townsville CBD; 1,353 km (841 mi) NNW of Brisbane

Government
  - State electorate: Townsville
  - Federal division: Herbert

Area
  - Total: 5.4 km^{2} (2.1 sq mi)

Population
  - Total: 2,424 (2021 census)
  - Density: 449/km^{2} (1,163/sq mi)
- Time zone: UTC+10:00 (AEST)
- Postcode: 4810
Suburbs around South Townsville
Townsville CBD	Coral Sea	Coral Sea
Townsville CBD	South Townsville	Coral Sea
Railway Estate	Stuart	Coral Sea

South Townsville is a coastal suburb of Townsville in the City of Townsville, Queensland, Australia. In the 2021 census, South Townsville had a population of 2,424 people.

== Geography ==
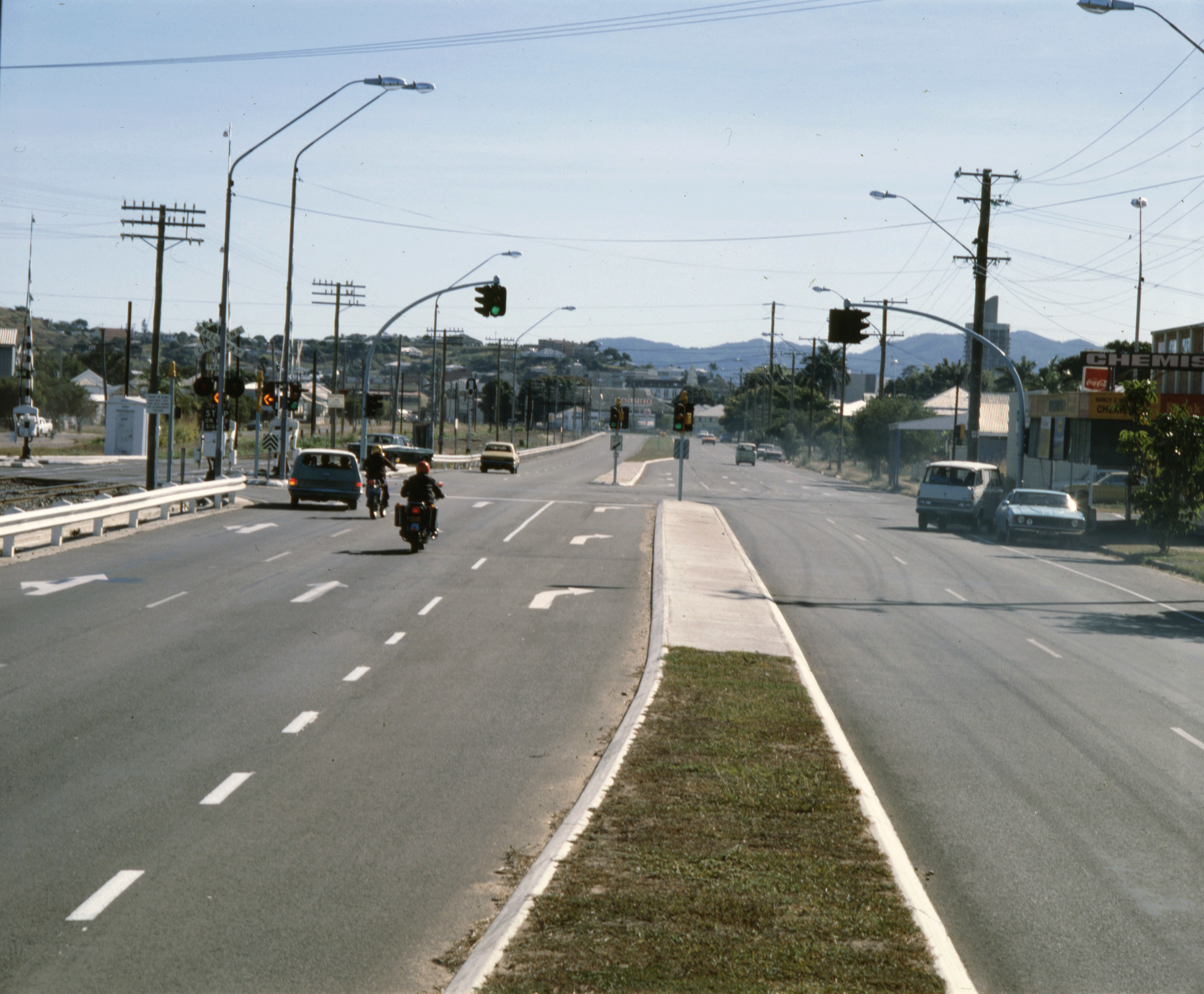
South Townsville, 1978

South Townsville is located on the northern end of Ross Island, bounded by the Coral Sea to the north, Ross Creek to the west and the Ross River to the east. The suburb of Railway Estate occupies the southern part of the island.

North Townsville Road (Boundary Street) runs through from south-west to south-east, North Ward Road (Dean Street) passes through the western extremity, and Townsville Port Road enters from the south-east.

Predominantly residential, it also is an important commercial and industrial hub of the city. The suburb is also a continuation to the Townsville CBD, serving as an accommodation and nightlife centre for the locals. The Palmer Street area of the suburb is known locally for its restaurants, hotels and its atmosphere. The suburb is also home to both the Port of Townsville and formerly Queensland Rail's North Rail Yards which have been redeveloped into the Queensland Country Bank Stadium.

== History ==
Ross Island State School opened on 26 February 1884. In 1936 it became Townsville South State School.

From 1973 to 1985, the Black Community School existed in a disused school hall at the rear of St Patrick's Catholic Church on Nelson Street. The school, set up by land rights activist Eddie Koiki Mabo, functioned as an alternative to the State education system, and aimed to provide a program better suited to black children's needs and which would better reflect their culture.

The suburb of South Townsville was traditionally a working class area and the home of lower-income groups. In the 1987 iteration of the publication The Townsville Region. A Profile and Social Atlas, produced by Townsville City Council, the suburb of South Townsville was profiled, with the following assessment:

Socio-economic segregation in Townsville determined which side of the river was allocated to the working-classes. Subsequently the less environmentally agreeable section of Townsville, subjected to tidal and periodic flooding, mangroves and poor access to the central business district, became the home of the lower-income groups. Restricted by lack of transport, South Townsville's residential area developed within walking distance of Townsville's major employers - the wharves and the railway yards. Boarding and guest houses, hotels and hostels, developed quickly to provide accommodation for the single males seeking work in the area.

== Demographics ==
In the 2011 census, South Townsville had a population of 2,138 people.

In the 2016 census, South Townsville had a population of 2,353 people.

In the 2021 census, South Townsville had a population of 2,424 people.

== Heritage listings ==
South Townsville has a number of heritage-listed sites, including:

- Victoria Park Hotel, 266 Boundary Street (19.2689°S 146.8289°E)
- St John's Anglican Church, 30–34 Macrossan Street (19.2634°S 146.828°E)

== Education ==
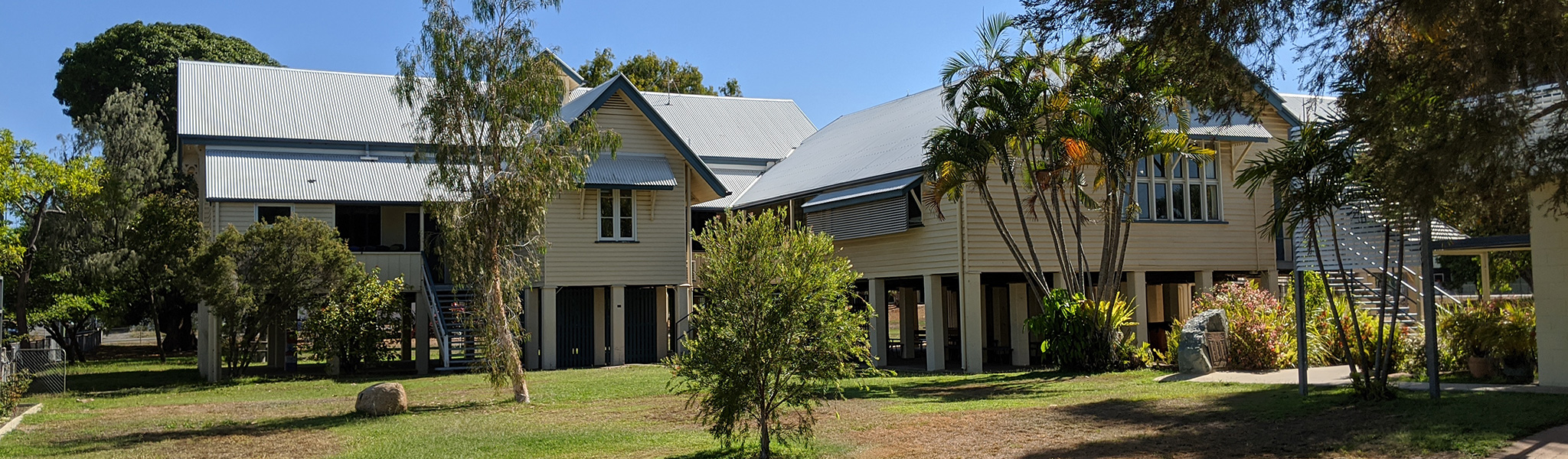
Townsville South State School, circa 2022

Townsville South State School is a government primary (Prep–6) school for boys and girls at 78 Tully Street (19.2629°S 146.8266°E). In 2018, the school had an enrolment of 126 students with 13 teachers (9 full-time equivalent) and 9 non-teaching staff (5 full-time equivalent).

There are no secondary schools in South Townsville. The nearest government secondary school is Townsville State High School in neighbouring Railway Estate to the south-west.

== Amenities ==
The Civic Theatre hosts many national and international artists in the fields of dance, music, opera, comedy and drama.

== Sources ==
- Hornby, Frank; Rasmussen, Cecily (1 April 1987). Hornby, Frank (ed.). The Townsville Region. A Profile and Social Atlas. Townsville: Townsville City Council (Community Services Department). ISBN 0959112375.
- Reynolds, Margaret (1 August 1977). "Preliminary Assessment of Achievement Levels in an Ethnic Community School". The Aboriginal Child at School. 5 (4). Brisbane: Schonell Educational Research Centre, University of Queensland: 21–25. doi:10.1017/S0310582200009299.
