= Ross Island (Townsville, Queensland) =

Island in Queensland, Australia

Coordinates: 19°16′15″S 146°49′19″E

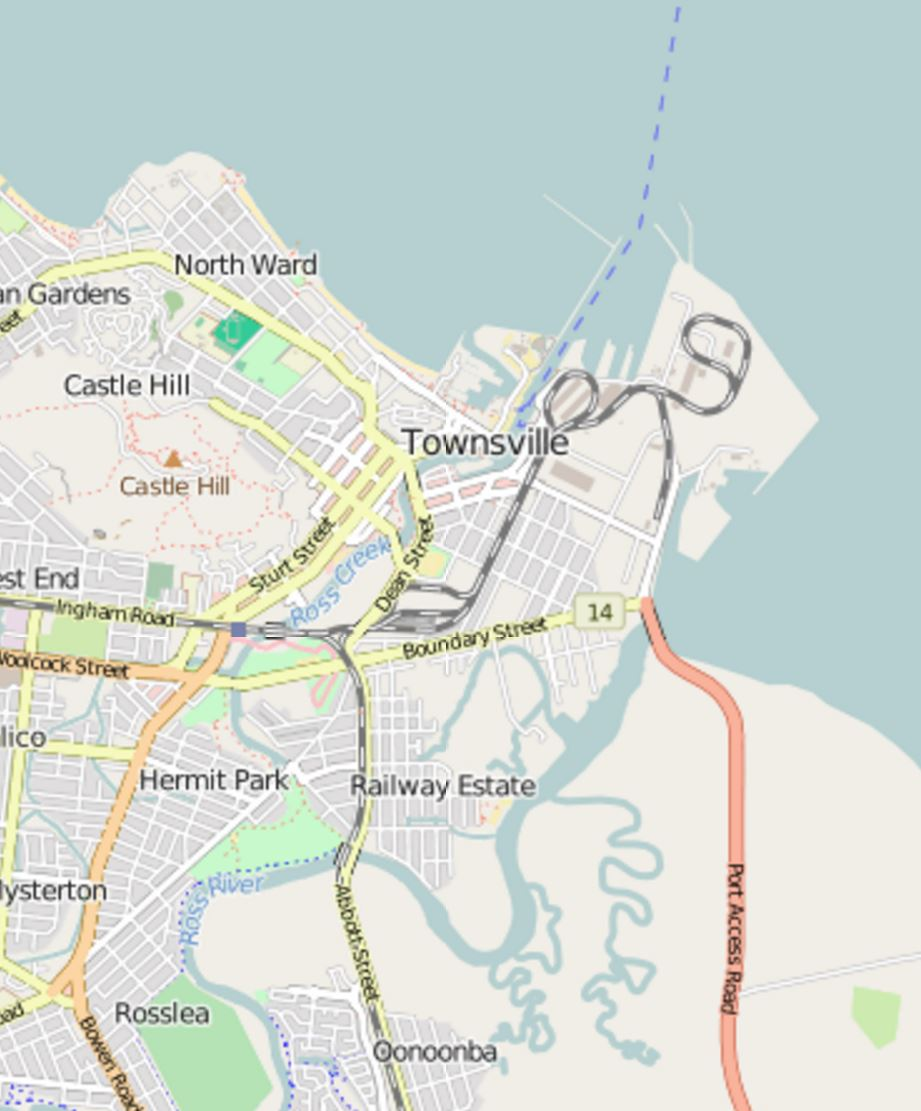
OpenStreetMap of Ross Island, Townsville, 2016

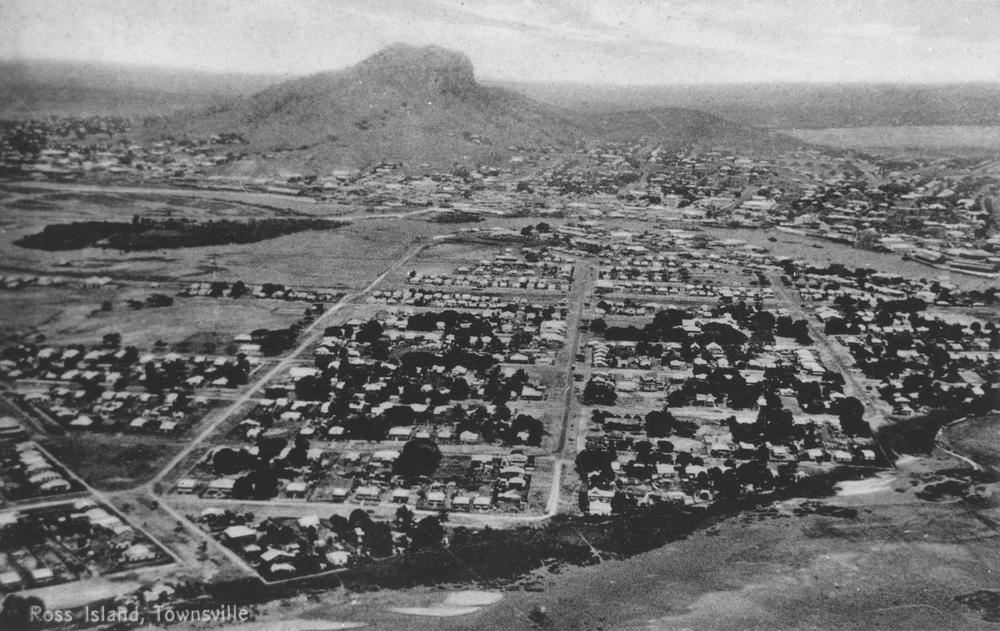
Aerial view of Ross Island, Townsville, circa 1920

Ross Island is an island in City of Townsville, Queensland, Australia.

== Geography ==
Ross Island is the land that lies between Ross Creek and Ross River and the Coral Sea. Ross Creek is itself a small estuarine portion of the Ross River which creates a bay inlet at the Coral Sea. Ross Island is divided into two suburbs of Townsville: South Townsville on the north of the island and Railway Estate on the south of the island.

== History ==
Ross Island is named after William Alfred Ross, European pioneer of the Townsville area and its first publican.
