= Ross Creek (Townsville, North Queensland) =

Ross
- Ross Creek circa 1878 with Castle Hill in the background

- Location of Ross Creek river mouth in Queensland
- Etymology: W. A. Ross, a colonial settler

Location
- Country: Australia
- State: Queensland
- Region: North Queensland
- City: Townsville

Physical characteristics
- Source: Ross River
  - location: Bicentennial Park, Townsville
  - coordinates: 19°16′53″S 146°48′37″E
- Mouth: Port of Townsville
  - location: South Townsville
  - coordinates: 19°15′59″S 146°49′56″E
  - elevation: 0 m (0 ft)
- Basin size: 2,225 km^{2} (859 sq mi)

Basin features
- River system: Ross River catchment

The Ross Creek, part of the Ross River catchment, is the small estuarine portion of the Ross River; it is a bay inlet that separates the Townsville central business district from Ross Island. The creek is located in the lower reaches of the river catchment, in the city confines of Townsville, in North Queensland, Australia.

== Course and features ==
The only passage across Ross Creek was by ferry until Victoria Bridge was completed in 1889. Ross Creek was the only port for Townsville until 1892, at which time the outer harbour was constructed. Vessels from interstate and overseas moored in Cleveland Bay and passengers were transferred to the northern shore of the creek by lighters.

== See also ==
- List of rivers of Australia § Queensland
