= Victoria Park Hotel =

Victoria Park Hotel, Townsville
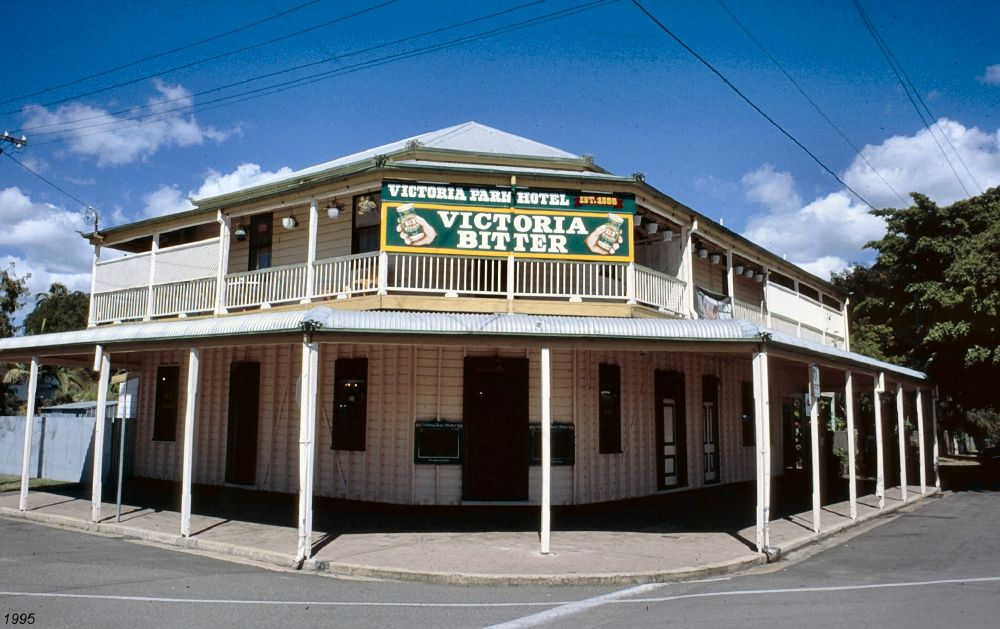
- Victoria Park Hotel, 1995

- Location within Queensland Location within Australia
- 19.2689°S 146.8289°E
- Location: 266 Boundary Street, South Townsville, City of Townsville, Queensland, Australia

History
- Design period: 1870s–1890s (late 19th century)
- Built: 1895–1896

Site notes
- Architect: Tunbridge & Tunbridge

Queensland Heritage Register
- Official name: Victoria Park Hotel
- Type: state heritage (built)
- Designated: 21 October 1992
- Reference no.: 600882
- Significant period: 1890s (fabric); 1896–ongoing (historical use)
- Builders: Jeremiah Dempsey

Victoria Park Hotel was a heritage-listed hotel at 266 Boundary Street, South Townsville, City of Townsville, Queensland, Australia. It was designed by Tunbridge & Tunbridge and built from 1895 to 1896 by Jeremiah Dempsey. It was added to the Queensland Heritage Register on 21 October 1992. It was completely destroyed by fire on 8 June 2018.

== History ==
The Victoria Park Hotel was the second hotel built on this site and opened in 1896. It was designed by the Townsville architectural firm of Tunbridge and Tunbridge and was constructed by local builder Jeremiah Dempsey.

Townsville was established in 1864 by partners John Melton Black and Robert Towns and was gazetted as a port of entry in 1865. It grew quickly as a supply centre and by 1873 the port was receiving international as well as coastal traffic. Improvements were carried out to port facilities to allow larger ships to anchor. By 1880 Townsville was the port for several major goldfields and had opened the first stage of the Great Northern railway line westwards through Charters Towers and beyond, consolidating its importance as a port and mercantile centre.

South Townsville was the second area settled in Townsville and soon had a number of hotels, houses and a hospital. By 1890 the suburb had grown substantially. In an era when private transport was expensive and public transport scarce, working people lived near their work. The presence of the Cleveland Foundry, railway and boat building workshops and other industries therefore attracted families to the south side of Ross Creek. Further development between 1890–95, including the establishment of Rooney & Company's sawmill and workshop, Victoria Foundry and the Ross River Meatworks, brought a further influx of people to live in South Townsville.

The corner of Main (now Boundary Street) and Sixth Avenue was an ideal location for the new hotel because it was close to the recently opened Victoria Foundry, the residential areas of South Townsville and Railway Estate and to Victoria Park, which in 1891 was the only ground suitable for playing football in Townsville. The land at that time was owned by William Casey who had purchased it in 1888.

The Victoria Park Hotel was designed by the local architectural firm of Tunbridge and Tunbridge in 1895. Walter Howard Tunbridge was born and trained in England as an architect. In 1884 he migrated to Australia and worked for Rooney Bros in Townsville. He left to establish his own practice in 1886 and invited his younger brother, Oliver tunbridge, to join him in 1887. This partnership subsequently became an important architectural and civil engineering firm in North Queensland.

The hotel was constructed by local builder Jeremiah Dempsey. On the 9 October 1895, the night before the licensee, Jane Guthrie, was to take possession of the completed hotel, it was destroyed by fire. A second building, of similar design, was begun on the same site. In November 1895, prior to the completion of the second building, the site was leased to Townsville merchant firm, Samuel Allen & Company. They sublet to Jane Guthrie who opened the new hotel, constructed at a cost of £1300, in January 1896.

The hotel catered largely for working people from the wharves, the railway, meatworks and foundry and at weekends, sportsmen from nearby Victoria Park. In 1898 Northern Breweries (Qld) Ltd took over the lease from Samuel Allen and Company. They sublet the property to Adelaide Joyce in January 1899. Samuel Allen and Company, who purchased the property in 1907, retained ownership until 1945 when they sold to Emily Hall of Bondi Junction, New South Wales. She leased the property to Townsville firm Cummins and Campbell who eventually purchased the hotel on 6 October 1969 and sold it in 1985. The hotel has since changed hands again and has had a history of leasing and subleasing to publicans.

Over the years other sporting venues developed, providing competition to Victoria Park, and many industries in the area closed. The character of the surrounding residential area has changed as earlier residents died or moved away. However, the hotel, locally known as the "Vic Park", attracted a regular clientele with a strong affection for it. In 1982, when the Licensing Commission proposed that the hotel should be demolished, there was a community outcry. It was largely due to the efforts of the hotel's patrons in attracting media attention and public support that the building was retained and underwent extensive repair and renovation. As part of these renovations, the bar area was enlarged and new toilets constructed, but the general appearance and layout of the hotel remained the same.

=== Destruction ===
On 8 June 2018, a fire started in a dryer in the hotel's laundry room resulting in the hotel being completely left to ashes. The blaze was so intense that firefighters were initially unable to enter the property, and it was reported that all that was left was a "large pile of rubble". The hotel was listed for sale at the time of its destruction, with an asking price of $2.5 million. There was even an attempt to restart business at the hotel, and in June 2020 rebuilding work was being done. However, in March 2021 the hotel was relisted for sale as a development site.

== Description ==
The Victoria Park Hotel was a two-storey timber structure situated at the corner of Boundary Street and Sixth Avenue, South Townsville and has major elevations to both streets and a corner entrance. The hotel was approximately L-shaped in plan with the roof, core structure and awnings truncated at the corner facing the intersection. The roof was hipped and clad in corrugated iron. The hotel had exposed exterior studding and was shaded at the street elevations by a balcony on the upper storey and a wider awning that spanned the pavement at street level. The awnings to both levels are of corrugated iron supported on timber posts. The balcony to the upper floor has dowel balustrading.

The hotel has several entrances on the ground floor, with accommodation above, following the usual internal layout of two storey hotels in Queensland.

The principal entrance was at the street corner and opened onto a large public bar. Leading from this on the Boundary street side was a lounge and dining area. The original timber ceiling remained above a modern suspended ceiling. The kitchen and pantries were located in a single storey extension to the rear along Boundary Street.

The upper floor contained accommodation for the manager and 6 guest bedrooms leading off a central hall. Guest rooms to the verandah had French doors and modern toilets had been constructed on the rear verandah at the south west.

There was a beer garden behind the hotel and a 1950s brick butcher's shop on Lot 2 RP 715005 which was acquired by Cummins and Campbell in 1979.

== Heritage listing ==
Victoria Park Hotel was listed on the Queensland Heritage Register on 21 October 1992 having satisfied the relevant criteria.
