= Walter Tunbridge =

Australian military officer (1856–1943)

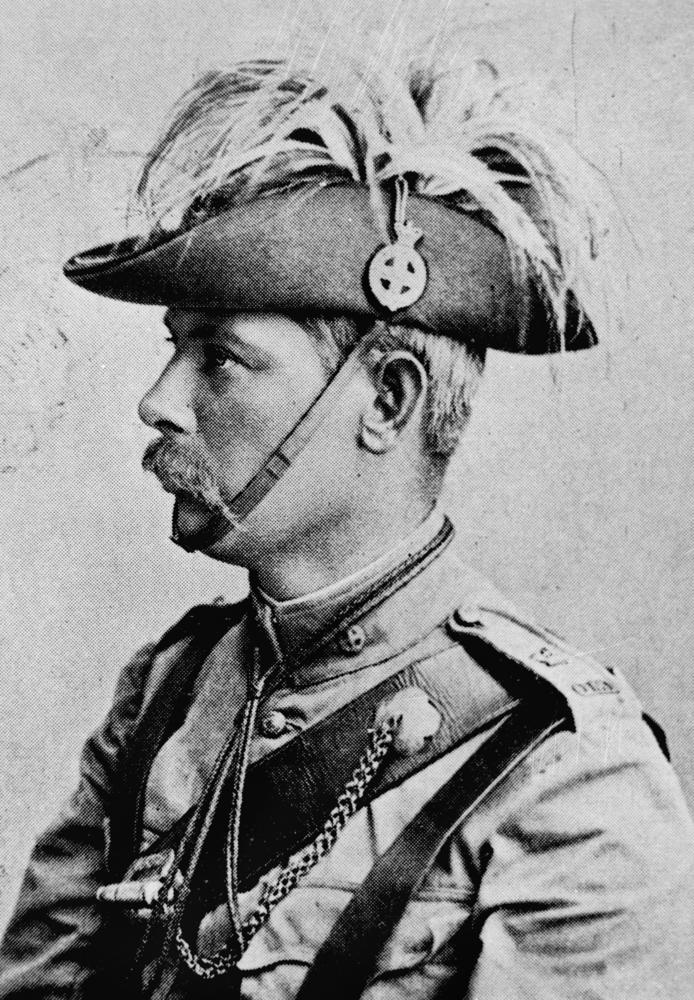
- Major Walter Howard Tunbridge in March 1900
- Born: 2 November 1856; Dover, Kent, England
- Died: 11 October 1943 (aged 86); Hawthorn, Victoria, Australia
- Burial place: Box Hill Cemetery, Melbourne
- Military career
- Allegiance: Queensland; Australia
- Branch: Queensland Defence Force; Citizens Military Force
- Service years: 1889–1920
- Rank: Brigadier General
- Commands: I Anzac Corps Ammunition Park; 1st Australian Division Ammunition Park (Mechanical Transport); 3rd Queensland Mounted Infantry
- Conflicts: Second Boer War; First World War
- Awards: Companion of the Order of the Bath; Companion of the Order of St Michael and St George; Commander of the Order of the British Empire; Colonial Auxiliary Forces Officers' Decoration; Mentioned in Despatches (6)
- Other work: Architect

Brigadier General Walter Howard Tunbridge, CB, CMG, CBE, VD (2 November 1856 – 11 October 1943) was an Australian soldier and architect, founding Tunbridge & Tunbridge.

== Biography ==
Tunbridge was born in Dover, Kent, to bricklayer John Nicholas Tunbridge and Anne, née Denne. Educated at Eythorne, he emigrated to Australia in 1884 and established himself as an architect in Townsville, where he would eventually establish the civil engineering, architecture and surveying firm Tunbridge & Tunbridge. Prior to, and during his early military service through the 1890's Tunbridge was well known for entertaining at his family residence Wolverton.

In February 1889 he was commissioned in the Mounted Infantry of the Queensland Land Forces, and in December was promoted lieutenant. He and his unit were sent to keep order at the 1891 shearers' strike, and in June 1892 Tunbridge was promoted captain. In November 1898 he was promoted major and transferred to the Queensland Artillery Garrison Battery, serving in South Africa from 1900 and commanding the 3rd Mounted Infantry Contingent. He saw action at Elands River and Rhenoster Kop. He served with distinction and was mentioned in despatches, appointed Companion of the Order of the Bath, awarded the Queen's South Africa Medal with five clasps and promoted brevet lieutenant-colonel. He returned to Australia in 1902 and served as aide-de-camp to the Governor-General.

In both 1903 and 1906, Tunbridge was unsuccessful in representing North Queensland in Federal politics as the National Liberal Union Candidate for the Queensland Senate in 1903, and again as the Free Trade Party's candidate for the Federal seat of Herbert in 1906 - losing both in tight contests.

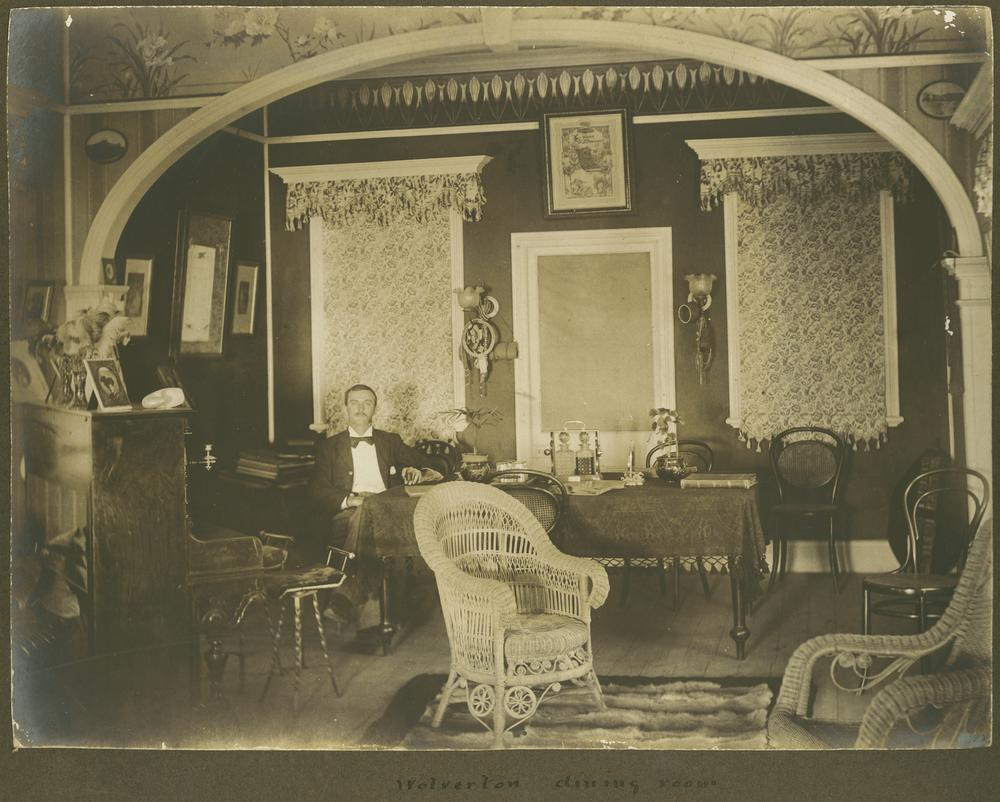
An unidentified man, likely Walter, inside the Tunbridge Family residence 'Wolverton' on Alexandra Street ca. 1895

On 7 April 1904 Tunbridge married Leila Emily Brown in Brisbane, and later extended his firm to include a Melbourne branch, where he based himself until 1914. Appointed censor for the 3rd Military District in August 1914, he was swiftly promoted to deputy chief censor and before the month was out returned to the military as a lieutenant-colonel in the Australian Imperial Force. Given command of the 1st Australian Division Ammunition Park (Mechanical Transport), Tunbridge and his units arrived in England in February 1915, where they were incorporated into the British Army as the 300th and 301st Mechanical Transport Companies and sent to France in July. Influential in various reorganisations of the mechanical transport units, Tunbridge was appointed to command the 1 Anzac Corps Ammunition Park on 25 April 1916 and following a reorganisation in January 1917 became senior mechanical operator of the 1 Anzac Corps. During the Third Battle of Ypres his responsibilities covered the entire AIF contingent in France.

Tunbridge was promoted colonel in June 1918. He had been mentioned in despatches five times during the war, was appointed Companion of the Order of St Michael and St George in 1917, a Commander of the Order of the British Empire in 1919 and made brevet colonel of the Australian Military Forces. He was placed on the Retired List with the honorary rank of brigadier general on 1 January 1920, and returned to architecture until his retirement in the 1930s. Tunbridge died in Hawthorn, Victoria, on 11 October 1943 and was survived by his wife and three children.

== Legacy ==
Tunbridge's works through his family firm, particularly in Townsville are still evident across its city and fringe suburbs. The Australian Institute of Architects has named the Queensland-based award the Walter and Oliver Tunbridge Award for Building of the Year in his honor.
