= Townsville =

- City
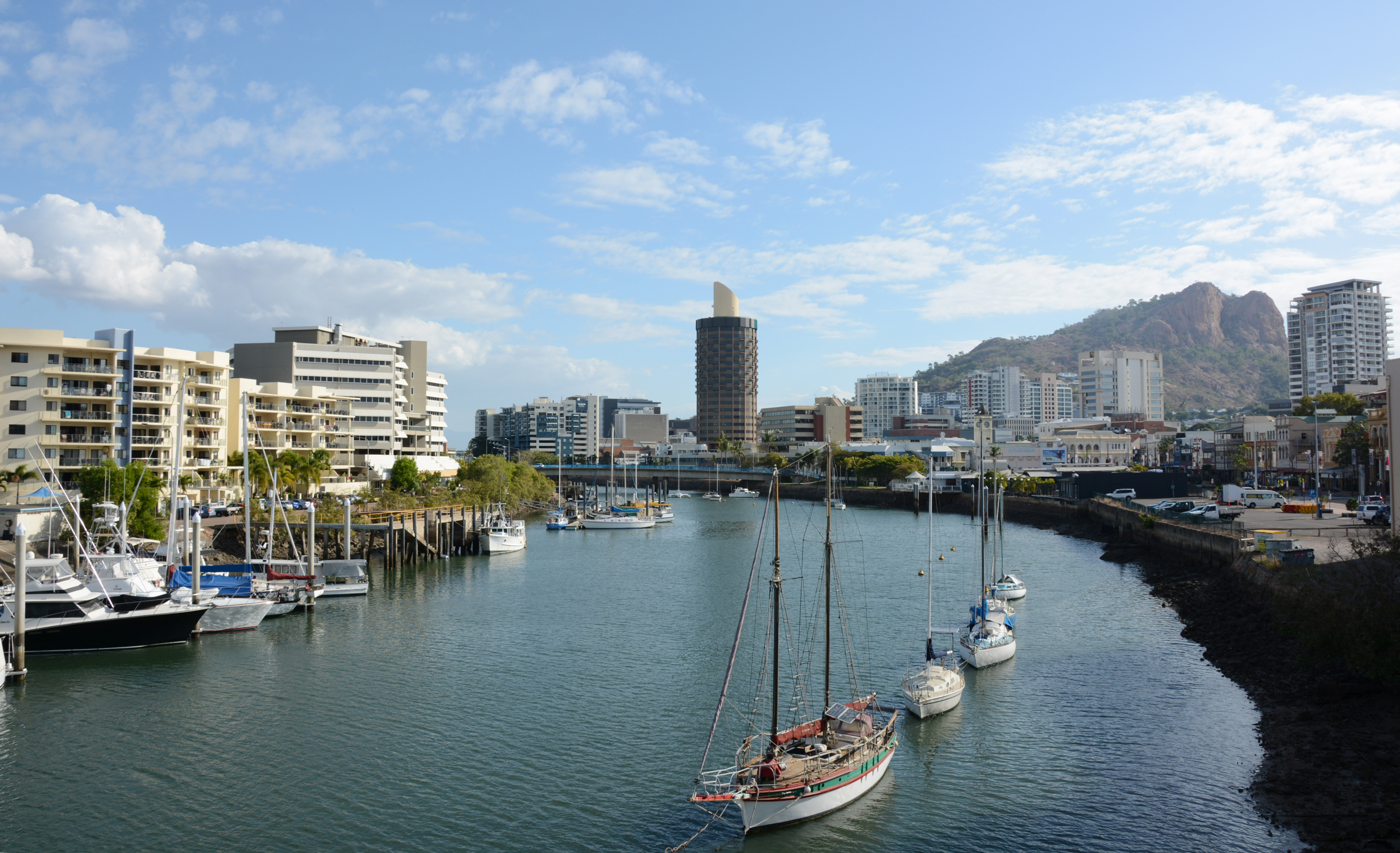
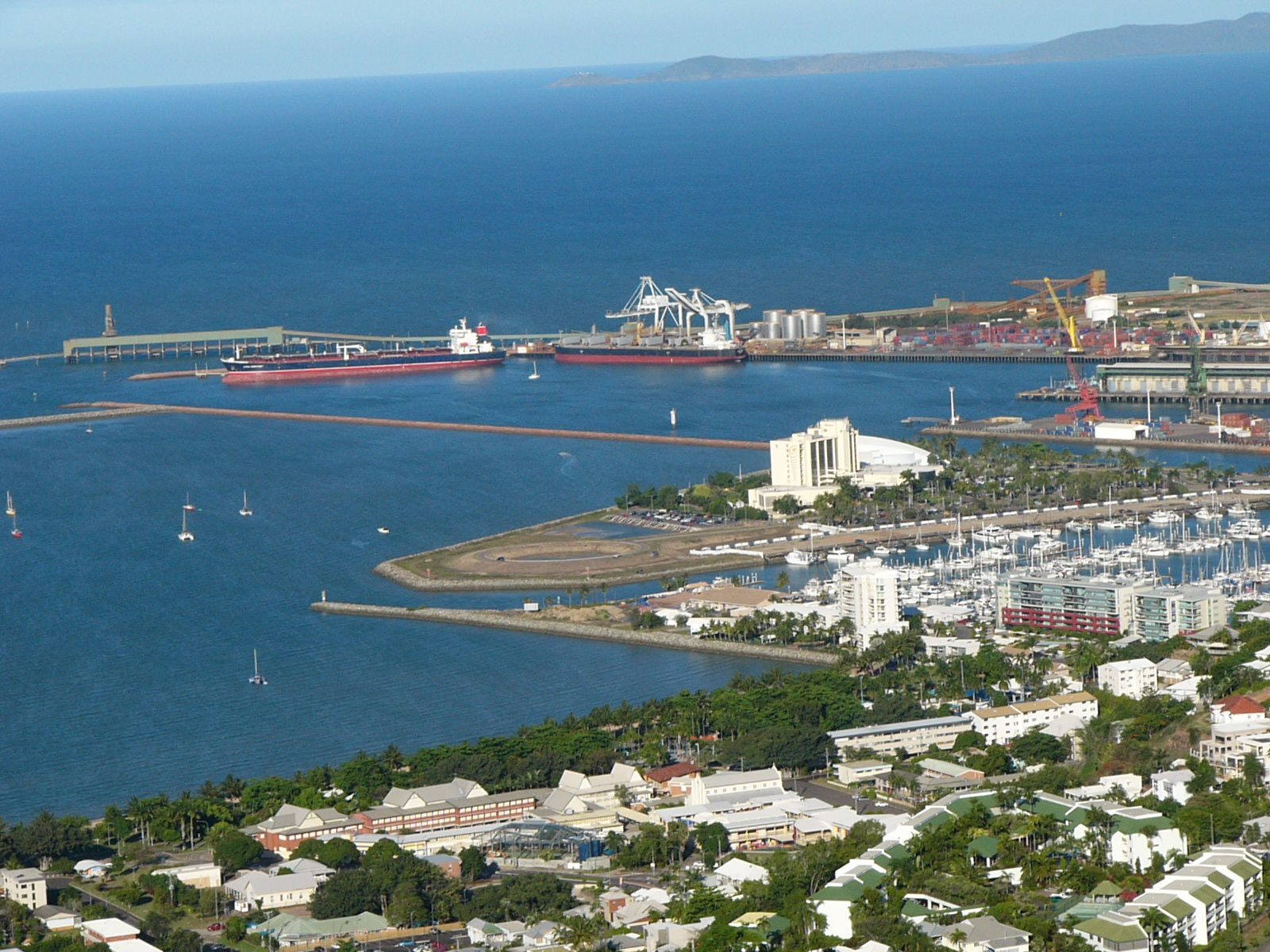
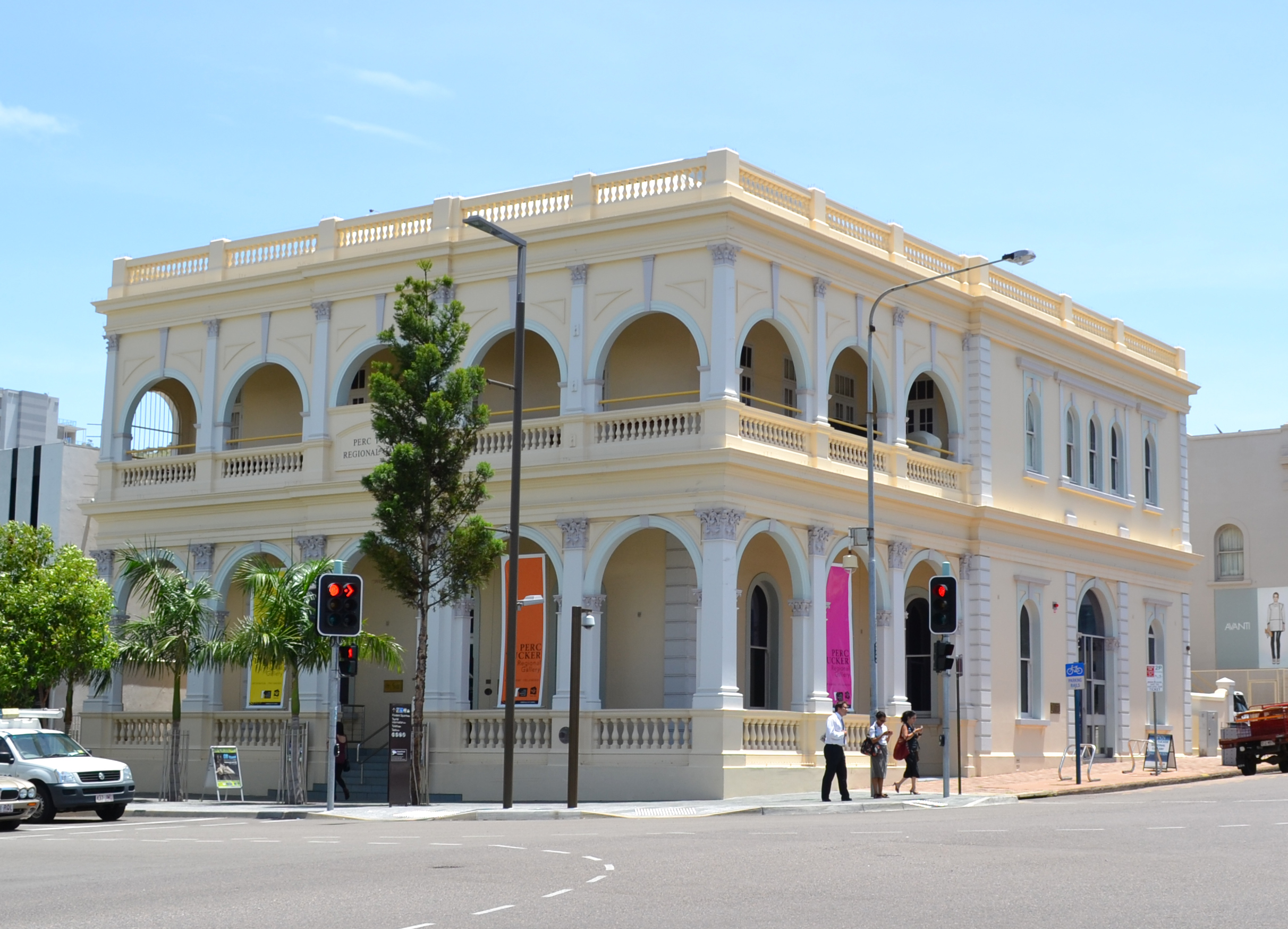
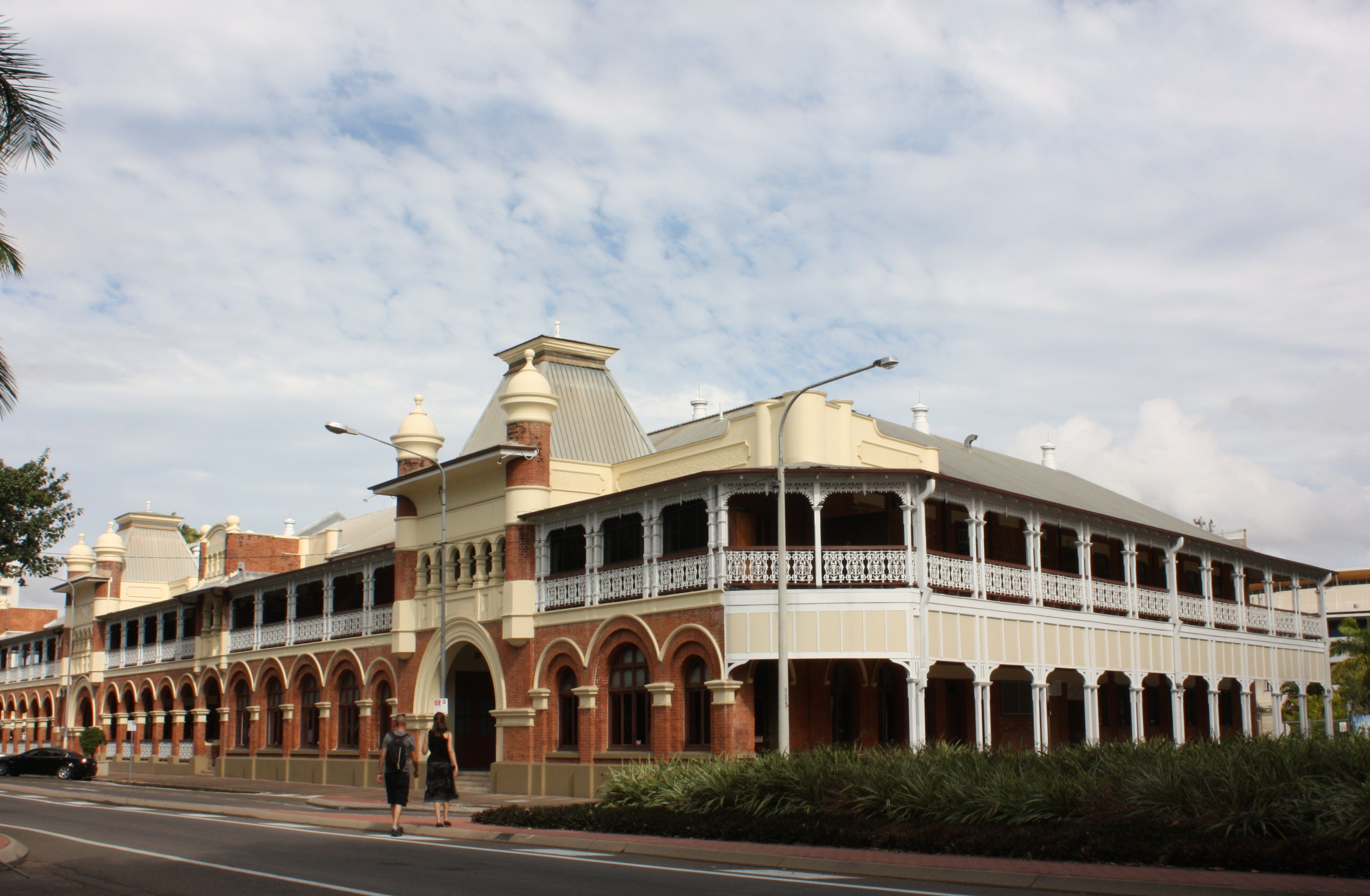
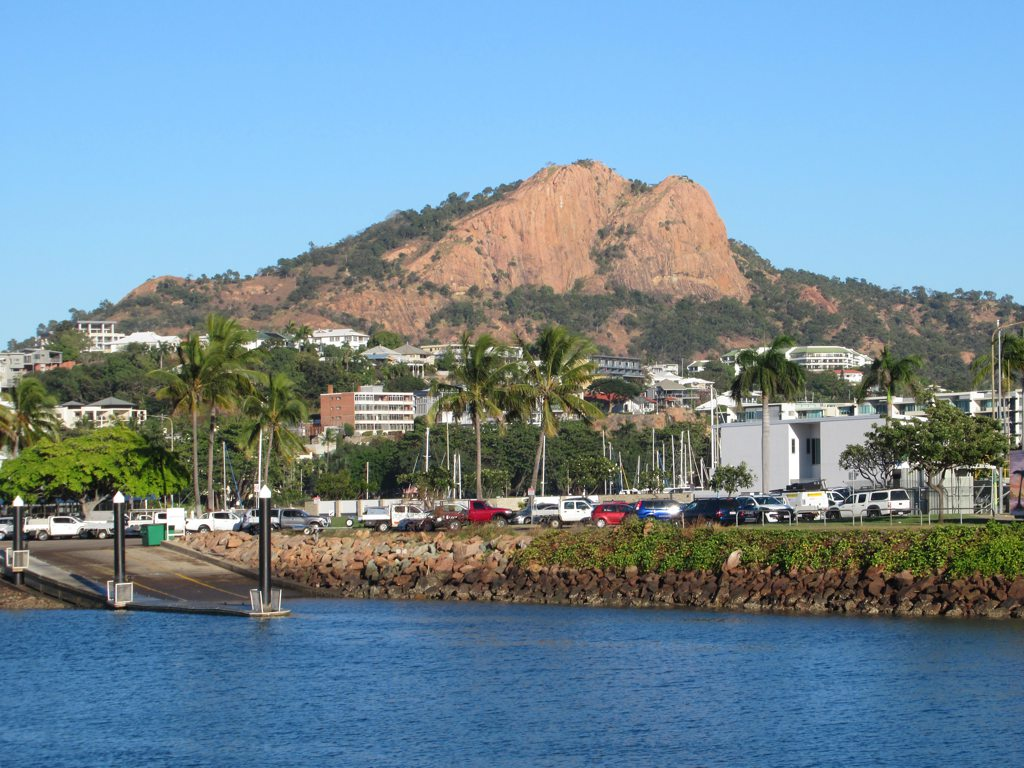
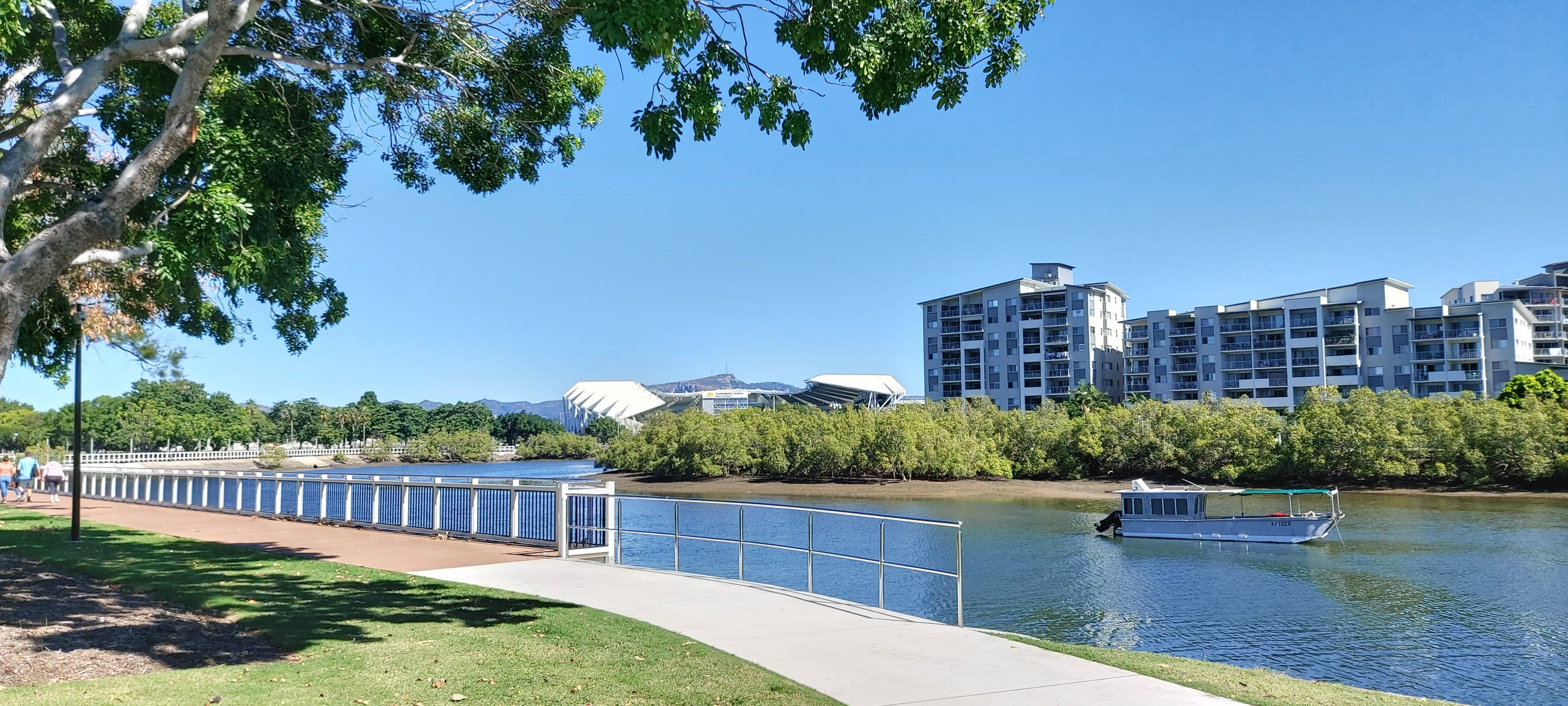
- Townsville CBD and Ross Creek Port of Townsville and Marina Perc Tucker Regional Gallery Former Queen's Hotel on The Strand Castle Hill Townsville waterfront with North Queensland Stadium in the background

- Coordinates: 19°15′S 146°49′E
- Country: Australia
- State: Queensland
- LGA: City of Townsville
- Location: 348 km (216 mi) SSE of Cairns; 386 km (240 mi) NW of Mackay; 1,267 km (787 mi) NNW of Sunshine Coast; 1,348 km (838 mi) NNW of Brisbane; 1,434 km (891 mi) NNW of Gold Coast
- Established: 1865

Government
  - Mayor: Nick Dametto
  - State electorates: Townsville; Thuringowa; Mundingburra; Burdekin; Hinchinbrook
  - Federal divisions: Herbert (majority); Dawson (minor part)

Area (2021 urban)
  - Total: 693.3 km^{2} (267.7 sq mi)
- Elevation: 15 m (49 ft)

Population
  - Total: 202,367 (As of 2025)
  - Density: 291.890/km^{2} (755.99/sq mi)
- Time zone: UTC+10 (AEST)
- Postcode: 4810
- County: Elphinstone
- Mean max temp: 28.9 °C (84.0 °F)
- Mean min temp: 19.8 °C (67.6 °F)
- Annual rainfall: 1,134.7 mm (44.67 in)

Townsville is a city on the north-eastern coast of Queensland, Australia. With a population of approximately 204,541 as of 2026, it is the largest settlement in North Queensland and Northern Australia (specifically, the parts of Australia north of the Sunshine Coast). Townsville hosts a significant number of governmental, community and major business administrative offices for the northern half of the state.

Part of the larger local government area of the City of Townsville, it is in the dry tropics region of Queensland. The city is adjacent to the central section of the Great Barrier Reef. The city is also a major industrial centre, home to one of the world's largest zinc refineries, a nickel refinery and many other similar activities. As of December 2020, $30M operations to expand the Port of Townsville are underway, which involve channel widening and installation of a 70-tonne Liebherr Super Post Panamax Ship-to-Shore crane to allow much larger cargo and passenger ships to utilise the port. It is an increasingly important port due to its proximity to Asia and major trading partners such as China.

Dominant sectors of its diverse economy include defence, administration, health and education, manufacturing, energy, transport and logistics. The city is a national hub for renewable energy, in green hydrogen and polysilicon, as well as the centre of CopperString 2032 being Australia's largest renewable transmission project. Townsville is Australia's 'fortress city', home to a large part of the strategic capability of the ADF, offering essential services including maintenance and supply chains including one of the largest military bases in Australia as well as a Royal Australian Air Force (RAAF) base that can accommodate most military aircraft in service. Townsville is the industrial heart of northern Australia, with a GRP of $15.1 billion in 2023. The city is served by Townsville Airport and the Port of Townsville, the largest general freight and container port in northern Australia.

Popular attractions include "The Strand", a long tropical beach and garden strip; Riverway, a riverfront parkland attraction located on the banks of Ross River; Reef HQ, which has been under renovation since 2021, a large tropical aquarium holding many of the Great Barrier Reef's native flora and fauna; the Museum of Tropical Queensland, built around a display of relics from the sunken British warship HMS Pandora; Castle Hill or as it was originally known, Cootharinga, the most prominent landmark of the area and a popular place for exercise; The Townsville Sports Reserve; and Magnetic Island, a large neighbouring island, the vast majority of which is national park.

== History ==
=== Early history ===
Aboriginal peoples such as the Wulgurukaba, Bindal, Girrugubba, Warakamai and Nawagi originally inhabited the Townsville area. The Wulgurukaba claim to be the traditional owners of the Townsville city area; the Bindal had a claim struck out by the Federal Court of Australia in 2005. The Wulgurukaba people call their country Gurrumbilbarra, while the Bindal call their country Thul Garrie Waja.

James Cook visited the Townsville region on his first voyage to Australia in 1770 but did not land there. Cook named nearby Cape Cleveland, Cleveland Bay and Magnetic Island.

In 1819, Captain Phillip Parker King and botanist Alan Cunningham were the first Europeans to record a local landing.

In 1846, James Morrill was shipwrecked from the Peruvian, living in the Townsville area among the Bindal people for 17 years before deciding to return to British society when the frontier of colonisation came to the region.

In 1860, George Elphinstone Dalrymple led a maritime expedition to the region from Brisbane. The expedition sailed to Cleveland Bay, finding a vast Aboriginal population. They landed on the shore near where the modern city of Townsville now stands and met with a number of Aboriginal people, giving them biscuits and tobacco. The Aboriginal people started to touch and feel all the expedition members and began "smacking their lips", which Dalrymple interpreted as an indication that they wanted to eat them. Another group of Aboriginal people came down, attacking them with a shower of stones and spears. Dalrymple and his men "were necessitated" to fire upon them, "repulsing them with loss." They landed again near Cape Pallarenda to obtain surveys from the hilltops but decided to descend to their awaiting dinghies as they noticed residents of three Aboriginal camps below were moving in their direction. These people were yelling and dancing "in a very hostile manner," and Dalrymple felt obliged to fire upon them. Dalrymple's group then made an "orderly retreat" to the dinghies, halting at intervals to fire upon those throwing spears. The crew that had remained upon the Spitfire had seen about eight armed Aboriginal men in canoes approaching them from nearby Magnetic Island in an apparent attempt to board the ship. A discharge of a brass gun repulsed them.

=== Establishment ===
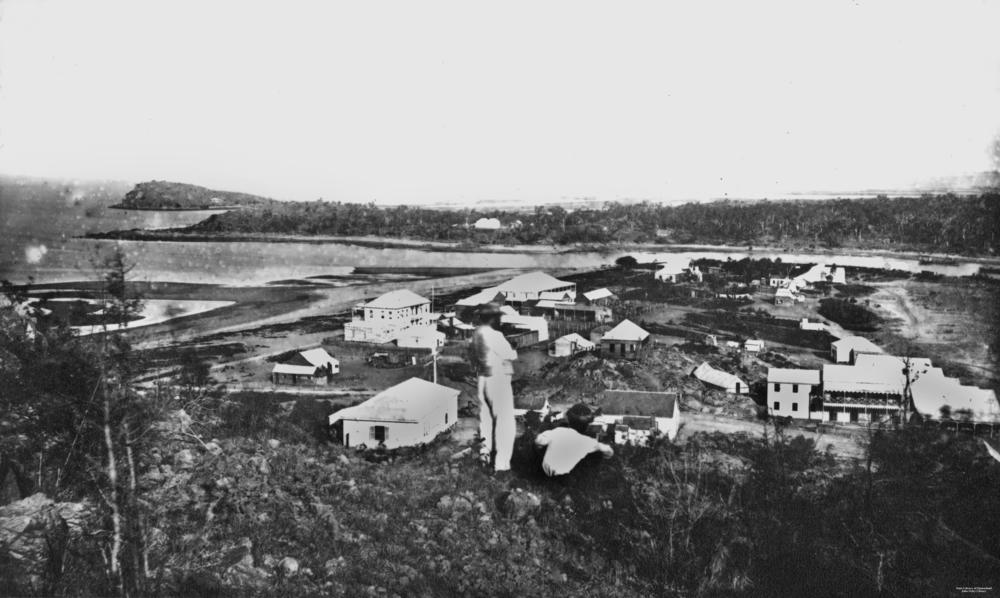
Townsville c. 1870

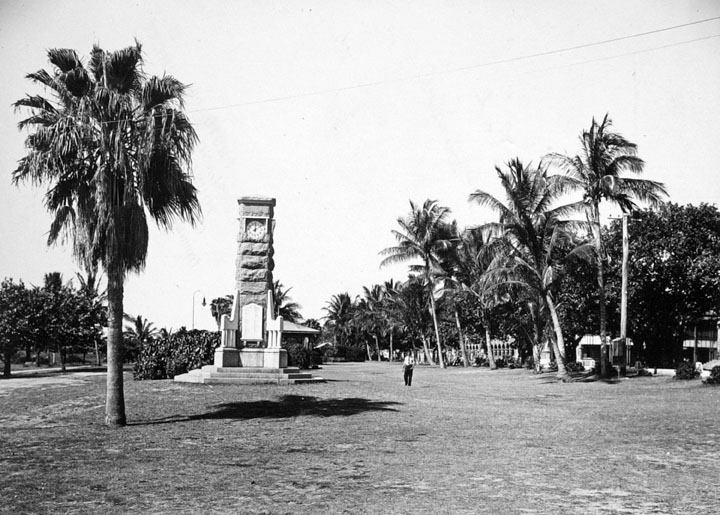
Anzac Cenotaph and Esplanade, Townsville, c. 1935

The Burdekin River's seasonal flooding made the establishment of a seaport north of the river essential to the nascent inland cattle industry. John Melton Black of Woodstock Station, an employee of Sydney entrepreneur and businessman Robert Towns, dispatched Andrew Ball, Mark Watt Reid and a detachment of 8 troopers of the Native Police under the command of John Marlow to search for a suitable site. Ball's party reached the Ross Creek in April 1864 and established a camp below the rocky spur of Melton Hill, near the present Customs House on The Strand.

Edward Kennedy, a Native Police officer accompanying the group, recalled how his "boys" (the Aboriginal troopers) chased four or five local tribesmen into the ocean. Kennedy then stated that he "left the "boys" in the water, pumping lead and hurling derisive cries at them, neither of which seemed to reach their mark". A member of the expedition who was from a town in the south accidentally shot dead an elderly Aboriginal man. He said that he thought an alligator was stalking him. On the return journey to Port Denison, the group "dispersed" another Aboriginal camp in reprisal for the killing of a shepherd. After the fighting, the "boys" rounded up around 12 women, each taking turns based on their rank in selecting one. "In five minutes, each had chosen their spouse and the ceremony was complete."

The next group of colonists, led by W. A. Ross, arrived at Cleveland Bay from Woodstock Station on 5 November that year. In 1866, Robert Towns visited for three days, his first and only visit. He agreed to provide ongoing financial assistance to the new settlement and Townsville was named in his honour. Townsville was declared a municipality in February 1866, with John Melton Black elected as its first Mayor. Townsville developed rapidly as the major port and service centre for the Cape River, Gilbert, Ravenswood, Etheridge and Charters Towers goldfields. Regional pastoral and sugar industries also expanded and flourished.

The Alligator Creek meatworks was established in 1879. Up to 1500 workers, many who resided in Townsville, would work at the factory. It helped to build up the economy of Townsville. Jack Flowers was a local of Townsville and started working at Alligator Creek when he was 13 years old (in 1913). He worked there for 58 years and would walk from Townsville to Alligator Creek. In 1915, the train line extended from Townsville out to Alligator Creek and in 1946 there was a dispute with workers who left work 15 minutes early to catch the 4:30 pm train back to town and the factory threatened to sack 340 workers reporting that it wasn’t 15 minutes but some had stopped working at 3:45 or 4 pm.

=== Importation of South Sea Islander labour ===
On 8 July 1866, Robert Towns imported the first boatload of South Sea Islanders into Townsville to labour on the cane and cotton farms. They numbered 56 and arrived on the Blue Bell, which had brought them from the Loyalty Islands and the New Hebrides. Charges were made against Henry Ross Lewin, the recruiter for Robert Towns, that some of the Islanders had been kidnapped to work on the plantations. In 1867, a magisterial enquiry was set up into the death of an Islander working on one of Towns' plantations. A pharmacist attending was of the opinion the death was caused by a lack of proper nourishment, the Islanders receiving only cornmeal for food. Other evidence was given by employees of the plantation company who claimed the labourers were treated well, and a verdict of death by natural causes was declared.

=== Turn of the century ===
Townsville's population was 4,000 people in 1882 and grew to 13,000 by 1891. In 1901 Lord Hopetoun made a goodwill tour of northern Australia and accepted an invitation to officially open Townsville's town hall, occasioning the first ever vice-regal ceremonial unfurling of the Australian national flag. With Brisbane, in 1902 Townsville was proclaimed a City under the Local Authorities Act.

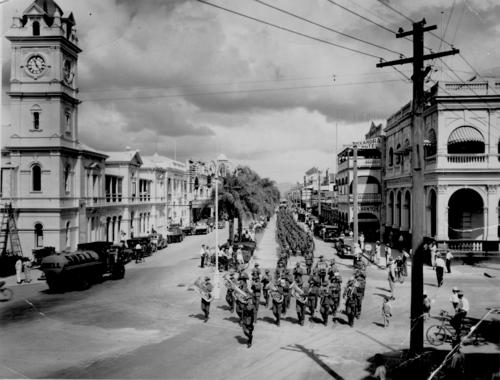
Parade of 31st Battalion, Kennedy Regiment, marching down Flinders Street, Townsville in 1937

The foundation stone of the Townsville Cenotaph was laid in Strand Park on 19 July 1923. It was unveiled on 25 April 1924 (Anzac Day) by the Governor of Queensland, Matthew Nathan.

=== Townsville/Thuringowa ===
The rural land surrounding the city was initially managed by the Thuringowa Road Board, which eventually became the Shire of Thuringowa. The shire ceded land several times to support Townsville's expansion. In 1986 the Shire became incorporated as a city, governed by the Thuringowa City Council. The cities of Townsville and Thuringowa were amalgamated into the "new" Townsville City Council in March 2008, as part of the Queensland state government's reform program.

=== Japanese influence ===
In 1896, Japan established its first Australian consulate in Townsville, primarily to serve some 4,000 Japanese workers who migrated to work in the sugar cane, turtle, trochus, beche de mer, and pearling industries. With the introduction of the White Australia policy, the demand for Japanese workers decreased, causing the consulate to finally close in 1908.

=== World War II ===
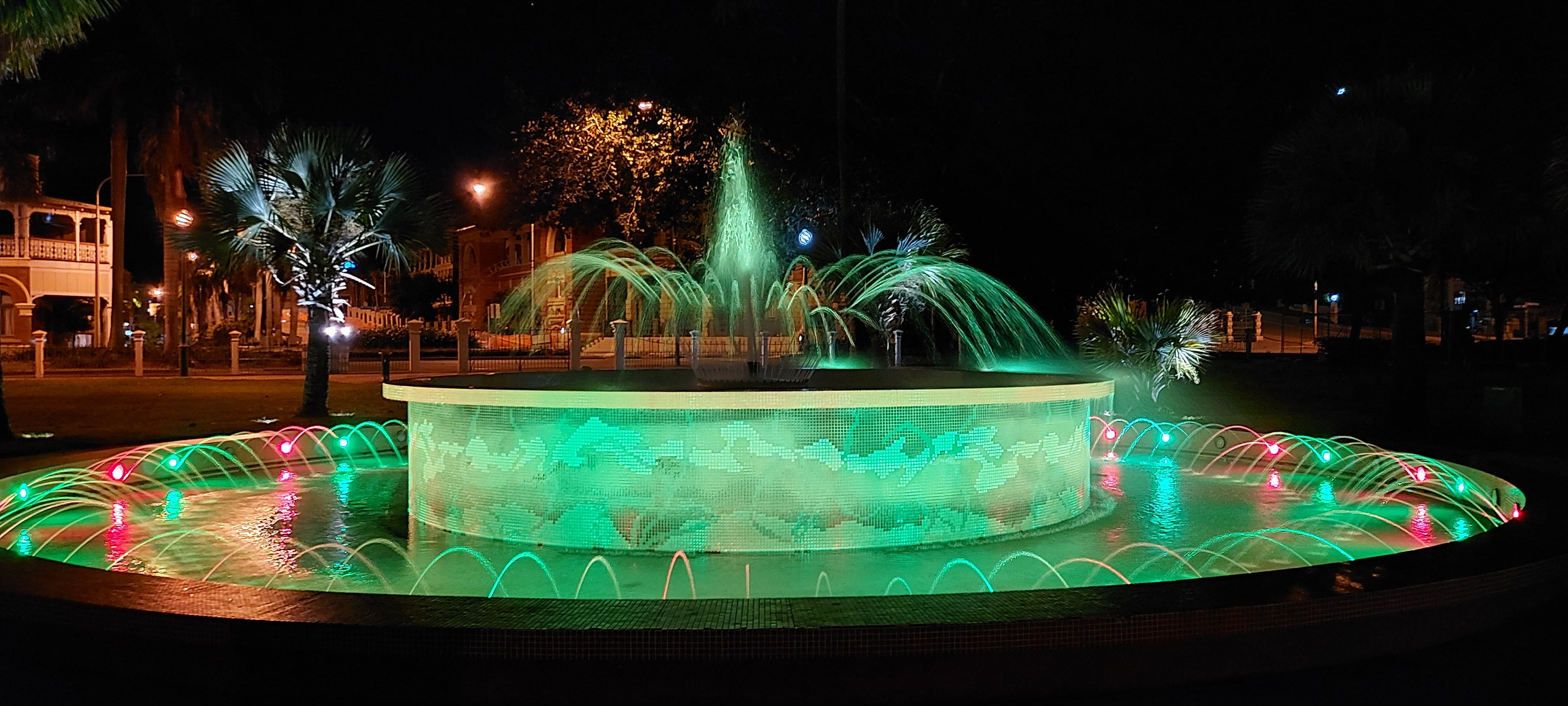
The Centenary Fountain built in 1959 to commemorate 100 years since the establishment of Queensland

At the beginning of 1942, Townsville had 30,000 inhabitants and between 5,000 and 7,000 of them voluntarily evacuated to other places. During World War II, the city was host to more than 50,000, and Townsville Naval Section Base. American and Australian troops and air crew were stationed here, and Townsville became a major staging point for battles in the South West Pacific. A large United States Armed Forces contingent supported the war effort from seven airfields and other bases around the city and in the region. Many buildings, schools and 177 private houses were commandeered for use by the military. Slit trenches were dug in many places, and 18 concrete air-raid shelters were built, six of them in Flinders Street. The first bombing raid on Rabaul, in Papua New Guinea, on 23 February 1942 was carried out by six B-17s based near Townsville.

Some of the units based in Townsville were:

- No. 3 Fighter Sector RAAF, Wulguru & North Ward
- No. 1 Wireless Unit RAAF, Pimlico & Stuart & Roseneath
- North Eastern Area Command HQ, Townsville, Sturt Street (now the Federation building)
- Castle Hill, Townsville tunnels & bunkers
- Green St. Bunker, West End, Sidney Street West End, Project 81 (now the SES building)
- 96th Engineer Battalion (which mutinied in April 1942.)

In July 1942, three small Japanese air raids were conducted against Townsville, which was by then the most important air base in Australia. On 25 July 1942 two Japanese Kawanishi Flying Boats dropped 15 bombs which landed near the mouth of the Ross River, only 370 metres (400 yd) east of oil tanks in the harbour. On 28 July, one Japanese plane dropped eight 230-kilogram (500-pound) bombs near the Garbutt airfield. On 29 July 1942, a single "Emily" Flying Boat dropped one bomb at the Experimental Station of Oonoonba and seven bombs landed in Cleveland Bay where bomb craters are still clearly visible. There were no deaths and structural damage was minimal, as the Japanese missed their intended targets of the railway, the harbour and the airfield and destroyed a palm tree at the Experimental Station of Oonoonba. Although the Japanese aircraft were intercepted on two of the three raids, none was shot down.

=== 1960s and 1970s ===
In 1961 the University of Queensland established a campus at Pimlico, near Pimlico State High School, later developing a site at Douglas near the Army Barracks, and across the new Nathan Street Bridge. The faculties of Arts, Law, and Education, and several residential colleges, Union, St Mark's, and John Flynn relocated from central Townsville. This was followed by the relocation of St Raphael's college for women. A large modernist building was established. In March 1962, first year university students painted the stick figure depicting The Saint on Castle Hill as a prank.

The Tasmanian historian Henry Reynolds, arriving into Townsville in 1965 to fulfil a position as a lecturer at the nascent James Cook University, noted the initial impressions the city had on him:

I arrived at the end of the long dry season, which had succeeded an usually poor wet season. Water was scarce. Gardens, parks, open space, the hills around were burnt off and bare. Clumps of dead grass collected wind-blown rubbish. Most of the houses stood up on stumps, perched uneasily between the baked earth and the vast vitreous sky. Townsville scarcely seemed to be a city at all. There was only one long main street, squeezed in between mud and mangroves on one side and the pink-brown granite of Castle Hill on the other. The sun arched high overhead. The shadows were short, sharp and intense. Many of the older people bore on their arms, necks and faces the ravages of a lifetime in the tropics. Almost everything was different - the light, the sky, the birds, insects, trees, the sounds and smells. But there was much that instantly appealed - brief, brilliant twilights, moon-drenched nights and, above all, the trade winds.

In 1971 Cyclone Althea with flooding slowed progress of infrastructural building, but by 1972 James Cook University was established, with ecru academic gowns, quite different to those of older universities. From 1961, only the first years of studies for Medicine and for Veterinary Sciences were offered in Townsville, but the establishment of a new General Hospital at Douglas provided facilities necessary for the establishment of an independent Medical School.

In 1970, Queen Elizabeth II, the Duke of Edinburgh and Princess Anne toured Australia including Queensland. The Queensland tour began on Sunday 12 April when the royal yacht Britannia entered Moreton Bay at Caloundra, sailing into Newstead Wharf. After visiting Brisbane, Longreach and Mount Isa the Royal Family travelled to Mackay. The royal party had a leisurely cruise to Townsville, taking four days to arrive after their departure from Mackay. On the morning of April 20, they were met by The Deputy Mayor of Townsville Mr. T. Aikens, M.L.A. and Mrs Aikens and Mr W.W. Shepherd, Chairman of the Townsville Harbour Board and Mrs Shepherd. The day’s program began with a cavalcade of progress at the Townsville sports reserve. The grounds were filled with crowds and children waving their Australian flag. It was a spectacle for the royal visitors and the local community who came out on the day.

Following lunch on board Britannia, the royal family were driven to the site of Queensland’s newest university, the James Cook University, Townsville campus. In the presence of many dignitaries, HRH Queen Elizabeth II formally granted autonomy to North Queensland’s new educational institution. In 2020, James Cook University celebrated its 50th anniversary with a Treasures exhibition, showcasing 50 collection items from Special Collections, Eddie Koiku Mabo Library, James Cook University, Townsville.

The rare collection item – ‘James Cook University Development: Pimlico to the First Chancellor archival footage, 1960 – 1970’ was one of the Treasures selected for the anniversary year. The 12min film preserved on NQHeritage, the University Library’s Special Collections online repository, shows footage of Her Majesty Queen Elizabeth II arriving at the official ceremony and being introduced to the official party. Their Royal Highnesses first appear in the film at 6:06 minutes.

On Christmas Eve 1971, Tropical Cyclone Althea, a category 4 cyclone, battered the city and Magnetic Island, causing considerable damage.

In 1973, Indigenous activists Eddie and Bonita Mabo established the Black Community School in Townsville, where children could learn their Indigenous culture rather than white culture. Eddie Mabo worked as a gardener at James Cook University from 1967 to 1975. It was at the university in 1974 that he first learned of the implications of the terra nullius doctrine which held that he did not legally own the land he believed was his under the traditional land inheritance system of his people.

=== 1980s ===
Buchanan's Hotel in Flinders Street, regarded by architectural historians as Australia's most significant building in the Filigree style, was lost to fire in 1982.

In 1981 a land rights conference was held at James Cook University and Eddie Mabo made a speech to the audience where he explained the land inheritance system on Murray Island. The significance of this in terms of Australian common law doctrine was taken note of by one of the attendees, a lawyer, who suggested there should be a test case to claim land rights through the court system. Mabo decided to take on the Australian Government. Perth-based solicitor Greg McIntyre was at the conference and agreed to take the case; he then recruited barristers Ron Castan and Bryan Keon-Cohen. McIntyre represented Mabo during the hearings. The James Cook University Douglas campus library is now named after Mabo.

=== 1990s ===
On 3 June 1992, the High Court of Australia ruled in favour of Eddie Mabo in Mabo v Queensland (No 2) recognising native title in Australia for the first time.

In 1993, the New South Wales Rugby League announced that a team from Townsville would be admitted to the expanded, nation-wide competition, and the North Queensland Cowboys made their debut in the 1995 ARL season.

=== 2000–present ===
In October 2000, a Solomon Islands Peace Agreement was negotiated in Townsville.

In February 2019, Townsville experienced a major flood event, which caused five deaths. Floodwaters damaged approximately 3300 homes and about 1500 homes were rendered uninhabitable.

== Urban layout ==
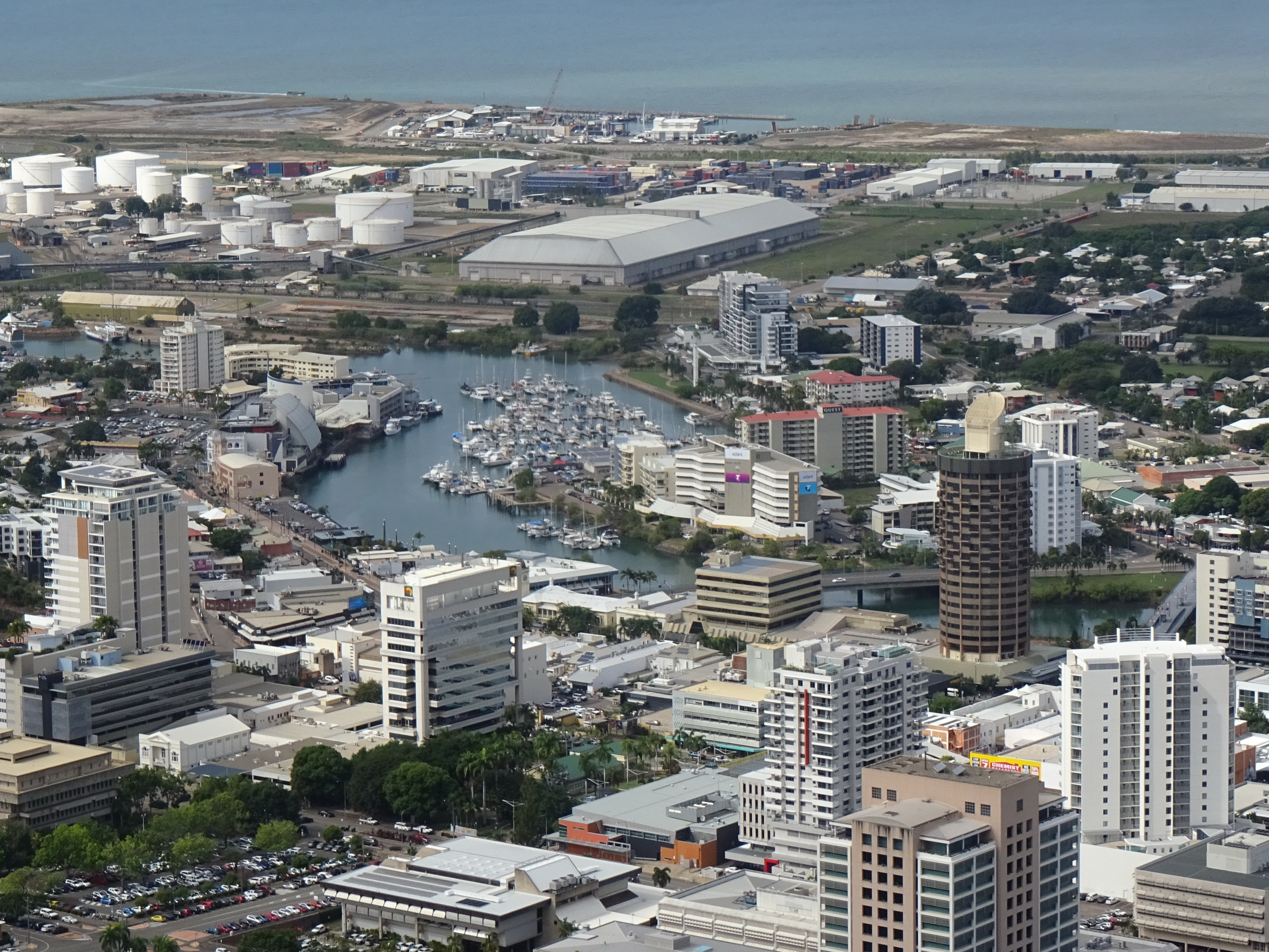
Townsville CBD and surrounds

Inner-city high-density development has also created population growth and gentrification of the central business district (CBD). One significant contributor to CBD development was the construction of a new rail passenger terminal and re-siting of the railway workshops, releasing prime real estate which formerly belonged to Queensland Rail for the development of residential units, retail projects and a new performing arts centre. The skyline of Townsville's central business district has undergone dramatic changes over the last few years, with a number of new highrise buildings, both commercial and residential, constructed.

In the short term, much of the urban expansion will continue to the west and the north, in the former City of Thuringowa. The most significant of these is North Shore Estate, a new $1 billion 5,000-lot housing estate, located close to the Bruce Highway, just north of the Bohle River.

Medium-term city expansion will be focused on two major urban developments that have started in 2017 and 2018. Elliot Springs, a satellite city to the south of Townsville developed by Lendlease, is expected to be home to 26,000 people by 2057. Additionally, the Queensland Government announced it would offer 270 hectares (670 acres) of state-owned land (the former abattoir reserve), just south of the Bohle River, for urban expansion.

== Geography ==
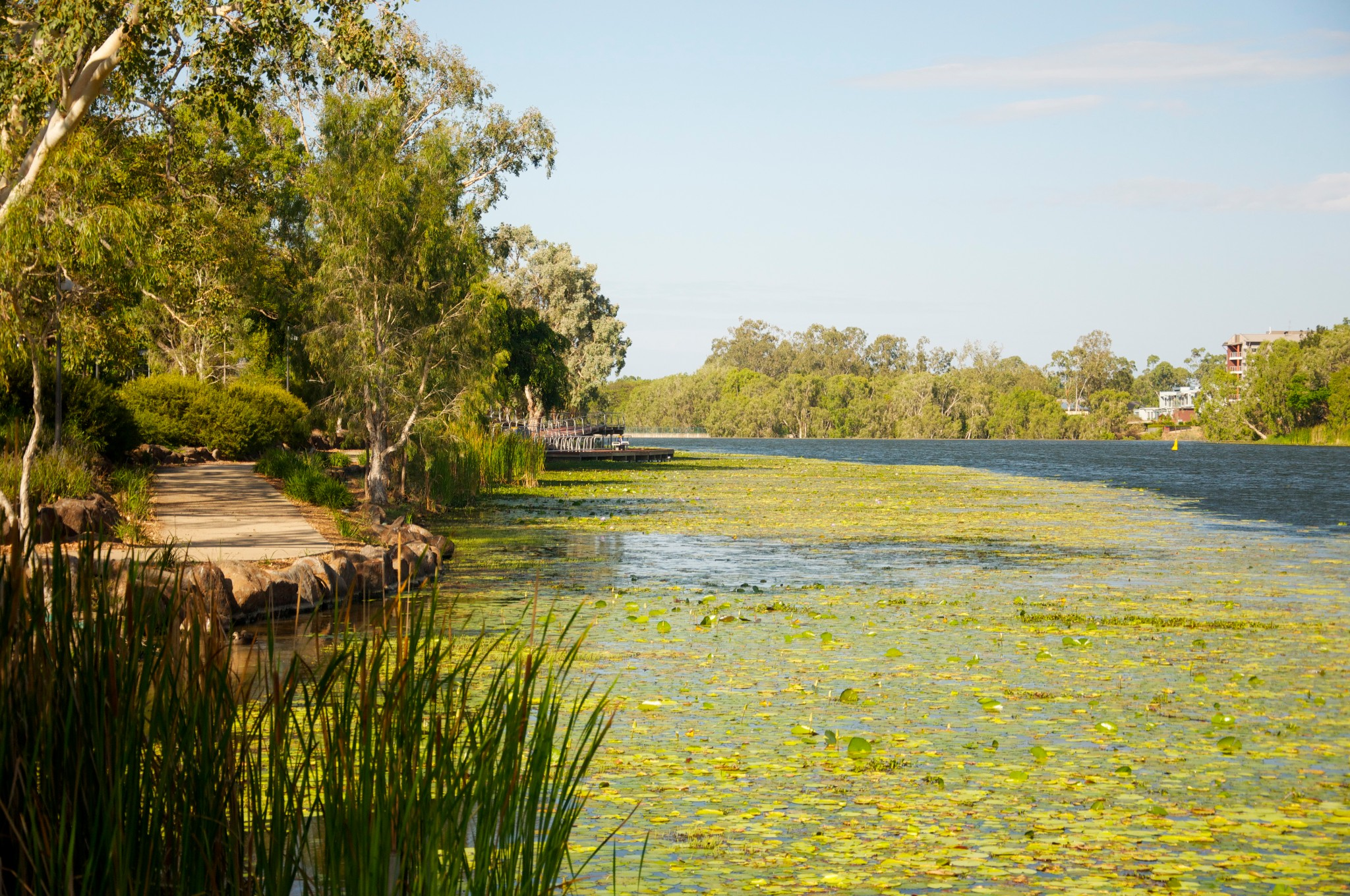
The Ross River that runs through Townsville

Townsville lies approximately 1,350 kilometres (840 mi) north of Brisbane, and 350 kilometres (220 mi) south of Cairns. It lies on the shores of Cleveland Bay, protected to some degree from the predominantly south-east weather. Cleveland Bay is mostly shallow inshore, with several large beaches and continually shifting sand bars. Magnetic Island lies 8 kilometres (5 mi) offshore, to the north of the city centre. It, together with Castle Hill in the town centre and Mount Stuart to the south of the city, form a large quartz monzonite igneous province.

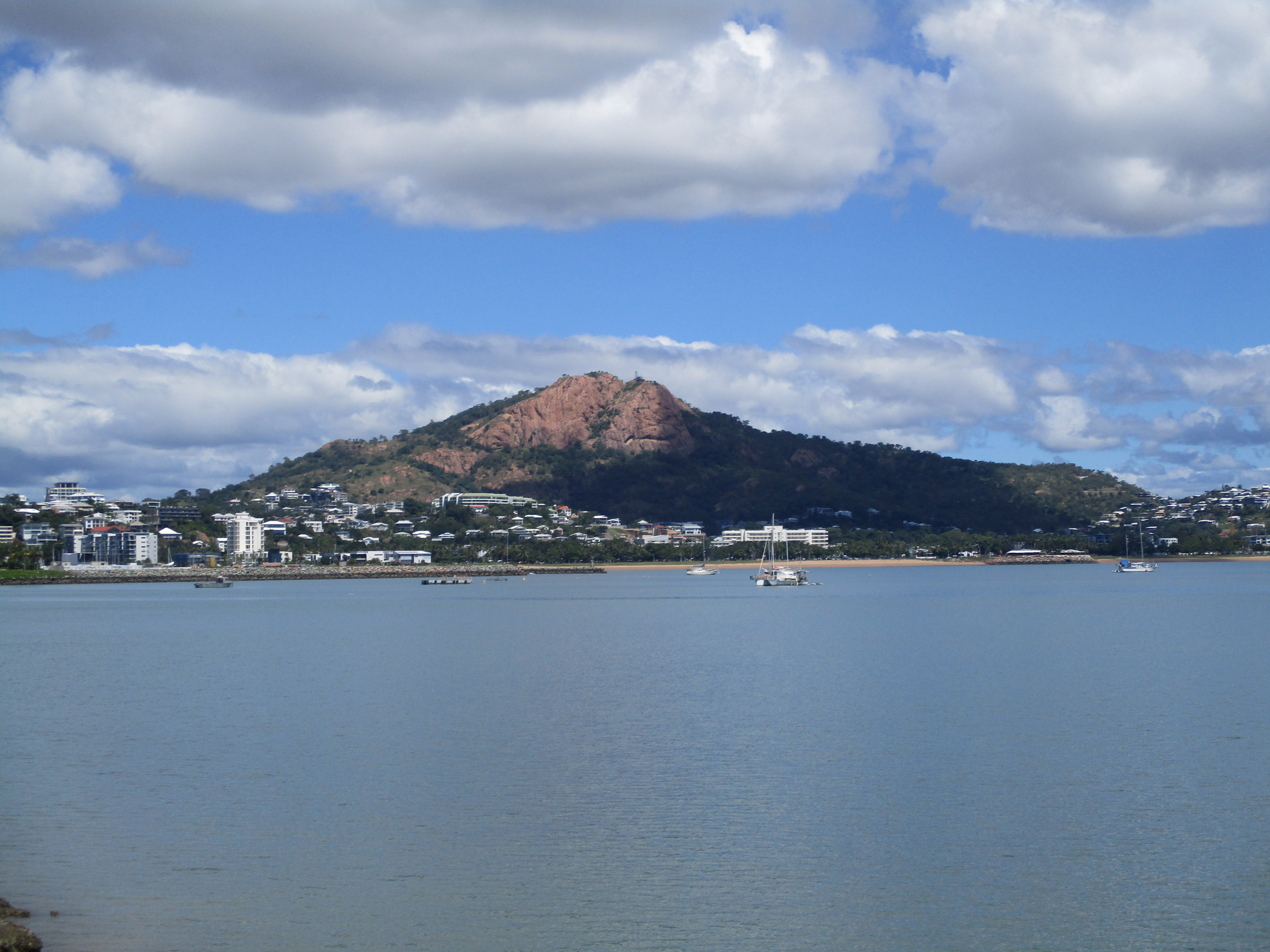
Castle Hill, a granite monolith in Townsville

The Ross River flows through the city. Three weirs, fish stocking and dredging of the river in these reaches has resulted in a deep, stable and clean waterway used for many recreational activities such as water skiing, fishing and rowing. Thirty kilometres (19 mi) from the mouth (at the junction of Five Head Creek) is the Ross River Dam, the major water storage for the urban areas.

The historic waterfront on Ross Creek, site of the original wharves and port facilities, has some old buildings mixed with the later modern skyline. However, the central city is dominated by the mass of red granite of Castle Hill, 286 metres (938 ft) high. There is a lookout at the summit giving panoramic views of the city and its suburbs, including Cleveland Bay and Magnetic Island. There are a number of parks scattered throughout the city, including three botanical gardens — Anderson Park, Queens Gardens and The Palmetum.

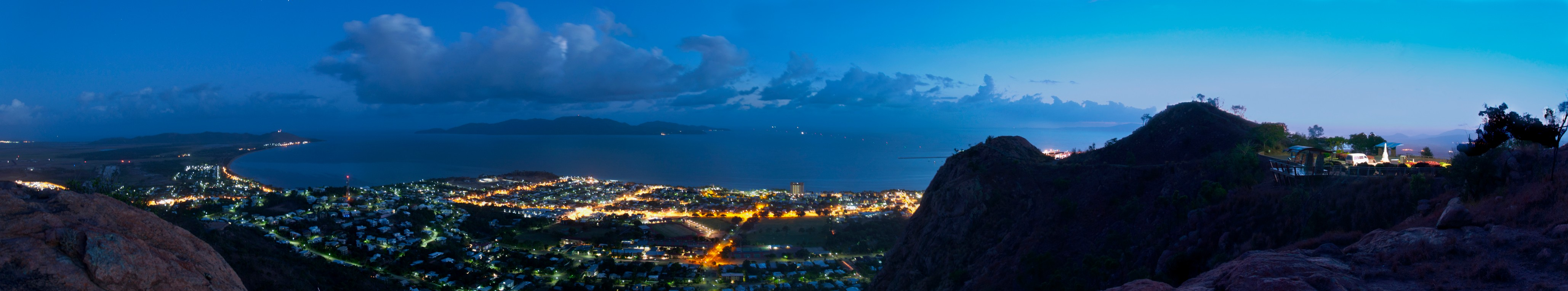
Magnetic Island viewed from Castle Hill at sunrise

=== Climate ===
Townsville, Queensland, Australia

Climate chart (precipitation, max. and min. temperature)
J	F	M	A	M	J	J	A	S	O	N	D
253 32 25	338 32 25	157 31 24	54 30 21	26 28 18	17 26 15	14 26 14	20 27 15	9.9 28 18	24 30 21	61 31 23	122 32 25
- █ Average max. and min. temperatures in °C
- █ Precipitation totals in mm
Imperial conversion
J	F	M	A	M	J	J	A	S	O	N	D
9.9 89 76	13 89 76	6.2 88 74	2.1 86 70	1 83 64	0.7 79 60	0.5 78 57	0.8 80 59	0.4 83 64	1 86 70	2.4 88 74	4.8 89 76
- █ Average max. and min. temperatures in °F
- █ Precipitation totals in inches

Townsville has a tropical savanna climate (Köppen climate classification Aw). Owing to a quirk of geographical location, Townsville's winter rainfall in particular is not as high as elsewhere in the eastern coastal tropics of Queensland, such as Cairns. The winter months are dominated by southeast trade winds and mostly fine weather. Further north the coastline runs north–south and the trade winds are lifted to produce rainfall right through the year. Townsville, however, lies on a section of coastline that turns east/west, so the lifting effect is not present. As a result, winter months are dominated by blue skies, warm days and cool nights, although at times significant rainfall may occur.

The average annual rainfall is 1,095 millimetres (43.11 in) on an average 61 rain days, most of which falls during the six-month "wet season" from November to April. Because of the "hit or miss" nature of tropical lows and thunderstorms, and the powerful influence of the El Niño–Southern Oscillation, variation from year to year is almost uniquely large for such a wet climate, being comparable only to a few cities in the Northeast of Brazil (e.g. Fortaleza). Since records at various urban locations started in 1871 twelve-month rainfalls in Townsville have ranged from a mere 217.9 millimetres (8.58 in) between December 1901 and November 1902 at the peak of the Federation Drought, to as much as 3,459.8 millimetres (136.21 in) between February 2025 and January 2026. On average, the driest year in ten can expect only half the mean rainfall, compared to around 64 percent in Brisbane, 68 percent in Sydney, and 72 percent in Darwin.

Rainfall also varies considerably within the metropolitan area; it typically ranges from 1,136 millimetres (44.7 in) at central Townsville City to 853 millimetres (33.6 in) at Woodstock, a southwestern suburb. The wettest 24 hours on record was 11 January 1998, with 548.8 millimetres (21.61 in) falling mostly in a 12-hour period after dark, which has since been dubbed the "Night of Noah" by Townsville residents.

Climate data for Townsville Airport (19º15'00"S, 146º46'12"E, 4 m AMSL) (1991–2020 normals, extremes 1940–present)
Month	Jan	Feb	Mar	Apr	May	Jun	Jul	Aug	Sep	Oct	Nov	Dec	Year
Record high °C (°F)	44.3 (111.7)	42.7 (108.9)	37.6 (99.7)	35.8 (96.4)	32.2 (90.0)	32.2 (90.0)	31.6 (88.9)	33.3 (91.9)	36.5 (97.7)	37.1 (98.8)	41.7 (107.1)	42.1 (107.8)	44.3 (111.7)
Mean maximum °C (°F)	35.4 (95.7)	35.0 (95.0)	33.9 (93.0)	32.3 (90.1)	30.5 (86.9)	28.9 (84.0)	28.3 (82.9)	29.6 (85.3)	31.9 (89.4)	33.0 (91.4)	34.4 (93.9)	35.2 (95.4)	37.4 (99.3)
Mean daily maximum °C (°F)	31.9 (89.4)	31.7 (89.1)	31.3 (88.3)	30.2 (86.4)	28.2 (82.8)	26.2 (79.2)	25.7 (78.3)	26.5 (79.7)	28.4 (83.1)	29.8 (85.6)	31.1 (88.0)	31.9 (89.4)	29.4 (84.9)
Daily mean °C (°F)	28.3 (82.9)	28.2 (82.8)	27.4 (81.3)	25.7 (78.3)	23.1 (73.6)	20.8 (69.4)	19.9 (67.8)	20.7 (69.3)	23.2 (73.8)	25.5 (77.9)	27.1 (80.8)	28.2 (82.8)	24.8 (76.7)
Mean daily minimum °C (°F)	24.7 (76.5)	24.7 (76.5)	23.5 (74.3)	21.1 (70.0)	18.0 (64.4)	15.3 (59.5)	14.0 (57.2)	14.8 (58.6)	17.9 (64.2)	21.1 (70.0)	23.1 (73.6)	24.5 (76.1)	20.2 (68.4)
Mean minimum °C (°F)	21.7 (71.1)	22.2 (72.0)	20.4 (68.7)	16.9 (62.4)	12.2 (54.0)	8.9 (48.0)	8.0 (46.4)	8.4 (47.1)	12.7 (54.9)	16.3 (61.3)	19.1 (66.4)	21.4 (70.5)	6.8 (44.2)
Record low °C (°F)	18.7 (65.7)	17.9 (64.2)	16.7 (62.1)	10.9 (51.6)	6.2 (43.2)	4.4 (39.9)	3.5 (38.3)	1.1 (34.0)	7.7 (45.9)	8.2 (46.8)	14.1 (57.4)	17.9 (64.2)	1.1 (34.0)
Average precipitation mm (inches)	252.6 (9.94)	338.1 (13.31)	156.7 (6.17)	54.3 (2.14)	26.3 (1.04)	17.1 (0.67)	13.9 (0.55)	20.3 (0.80)	9.9 (0.39)	24.3 (0.96)	60.6 (2.39)	122.2 (4.81)	1,095.3 (43.12)
Average precipitation days (≥ 1.0 mm)	11.3	12.2	7.9	4.3	2.8	2.6	1.7	1.3	1.4	2.7	5.1	7.2	60.5
Average afternoon relative humidity (%)	64	68	60	58	55	52	50	51	53	55	58	60	57
Average dew point °C (°F)	22.5 (72.5)	23.1 (73.6)	21.1 (70.0)	19.0 (66.2)	16.3 (61.3)	13.5 (56.3)	12.1 (53.8)	13.4 (56.1)	15.6 (60.1)	17.8 (64.0)	19.7 (67.5)	21.4 (70.5)	18.0 (64.3)
Mean monthly sunshine hours	254.2	211.9	244.9	243.0	244.9	231.0	263.5	279.0	291.0	306.9	291.0	288.3	3,149.6
Percentage possible sunshine	62	60	64	70	71	71	77	80	80	78	74	70	71
Source: Bureau of Meteorology (1991–2020 normals, extremes 1940–2024)

Townsville Airport Rainfall Data
Month	Jan	Feb	Mar	Apr	May	Jun	Jul	Aug	Sep	Oct	Nov	Dec	Total
Highest rainfall mm (inches)	1,141.7 (44.9)	1,198.0 (47.2)	1,004.6 (39.6)	546.2 (21.5)	180.8 (7.1)	111.4 (4.4)	173.7 (6.8)	258.2 (10.2)	84.4 (3.3)	252.8 (10.0)	345.2 (13.6)	458.0 (18.0)	2,950.8 (116.2)
Highest 24-hour rainfall mm (inches)	548.8 (21.6)	317.6 (12.5)	366.5 (14.4)	271.6 (10.7)	96.0 (3.8)	93.0 (3.7)	89.8 (3.5)	134.2 (5.3)	64.6 (2.5)	89.4 (3.5)	132.8 (5.2)	206.8 (8.1)	548.8 (21.6)
Average rainfall mm (inches)	252.2 (9.9)	298.7 (11.8)	192.4 (7.6)	66.4 (2.6)	31.7 (1.2)	21.2 (0.8)	14.9 (0.6)	16.1 (0.6)	10.4 (0.4)	23.4 (0.9)	58.4 (2.3)	127.7 (5.0)	1,134.7 (44.7)
Lowest rainfall mm (inches)	8.8 (0.3)	4.2 (0.2)	2.0 (0.1)	0.3 (0.0)	0 (0.0)	0 (0.0)	0 (0.0)	0 (0.0)	0 (0.0)	0 (0.0)	0.2 (0.0)	0 (0.0)	397.6 (15.7)
Source: Bureau of Meteorology

December is the warmest month of the year with daily mean maximum and minimum temperatures being 31.5 °C (88.7 °F) and 24.1 °C (75.4 °F) respectively. July is the coolest month with daily mean maximum and minimum temperatures being 25.1 °C (77.2 °F) and 13.7 °C (56.7 °F). Townsville experiences an annual mean of 8.5 hours of sunshine per day, averaging 120.8 clear days per year.

==== Tropical cyclones and flooding ====
Like most of Northern Australia, Townsville is susceptible to tropical cyclones. They usually occur between December and April, forming mainly out in the Coral Sea, and usually tracking west to the coast. Notable cyclones to affect the Townsville Region have been: Cyclone Kirrily (2024), Cyclone Yasi (2011), Cyclone Tessi (2000), Cyclone Sid (1998, in particular damaging The Strand and causing major flooding), Cyclone Joy (1990), Cyclone Althea (1971), Cyclone Leonta (1903), and Cyclone Sigma (1896). The city was also affected by the 2019 Townsville flood, the convergence of a monsoon and a slow-moving tropical low.

== Governance ==
Townsville has offices of many State and Federal Government agencies, such as Centrelink and the Australian Taxation Office.

=== Local ===
Townsville is governed by a City Council, comprising an independently elected Mayor and 10 Councillors who each represent a separate division within the local government area. Following local government reform undertaken by the Government of Queensland prior to the March 2008 elections, the previous entities of NQ Water, The City of Townsville and the City of Thuringowa were amalgamated.

In the 2024 Townsville City Council election, Troy Thompson (Independent) defeated incumbent mayor Jenny Hill, who had held the position since 2012, with a two-candidate preferred vote of 52.62%. Thompson subsequently faced a Crime and Corruption Commission (CCC) investigation into allegations he had misled voters about his military, business and educational credentials during the campaign. Thompson had claimed to have spent five years with the Royal Australian Corps of Signals and the SAS Regiment; he later admitted in a May 2024 interview on A Current Affair that he had served only three years as a reservist, largely in the catering corps, attributing the discrepancy to memory issues stemming from repeated concussions. Following a show-cause notice issued by Local Government Minister Ann Leahy, Thompson was suspended on full pay of approximately $225,000 per year in November 2024.After facing a unanimous vote of no confidence from Townsville councillors and sustained bipartisan pressure over 18 months, Thompson resigned in September 2025, stating his resignation was not an admission of wrongdoing and announcing his intention to stand in the subsequent byelection. Leahy confirmed Thompson remained eligible to contest the byelection, which was required to be held within two months of his resignation."

=== State ===
In the unicameral Queensland Parliament five electorates cover the Townsville Region:

- Electoral district of Burdekin (southern suburbs): Dale Last MP (LNP)
- Electoral district of Hinchinbrook (northern suburbs): Nick Dametto MP (Katter's Australian Party)
- Electoral district of Mundingburra (central/southern suburbs): Janelle Poole MP (LNP)
- Electoral district of Thuringowa (western/northern suburbs): Natalie Marr MP (LNP)
- Electoral district of Townsville (CBD + Magnetic & Palm Islands): Adam Baillie MP (LNP)

=== Federal ===
The majority of the population of Townsville is represented in the Australian House of Representatives by Phillip Thompson of the Liberal National Party, reelected as the member for the Division of Herbert at the 2025 Australian Federal Election. Some of the suburbs on the southern fringe of the urban area are part of the Division of Dawson and are represented by Andrew Willcox, representing the Liberal National Party. Some of the northern suburbs of Townsville, known collectively as the "Northern Beaches", are included in the Division of Kennedy which is represented by Bob Katter (Katter's Australian Party), who is based in Mount Isa about 900 kilometres (560 mi) west of Townsville.

== Economy ==
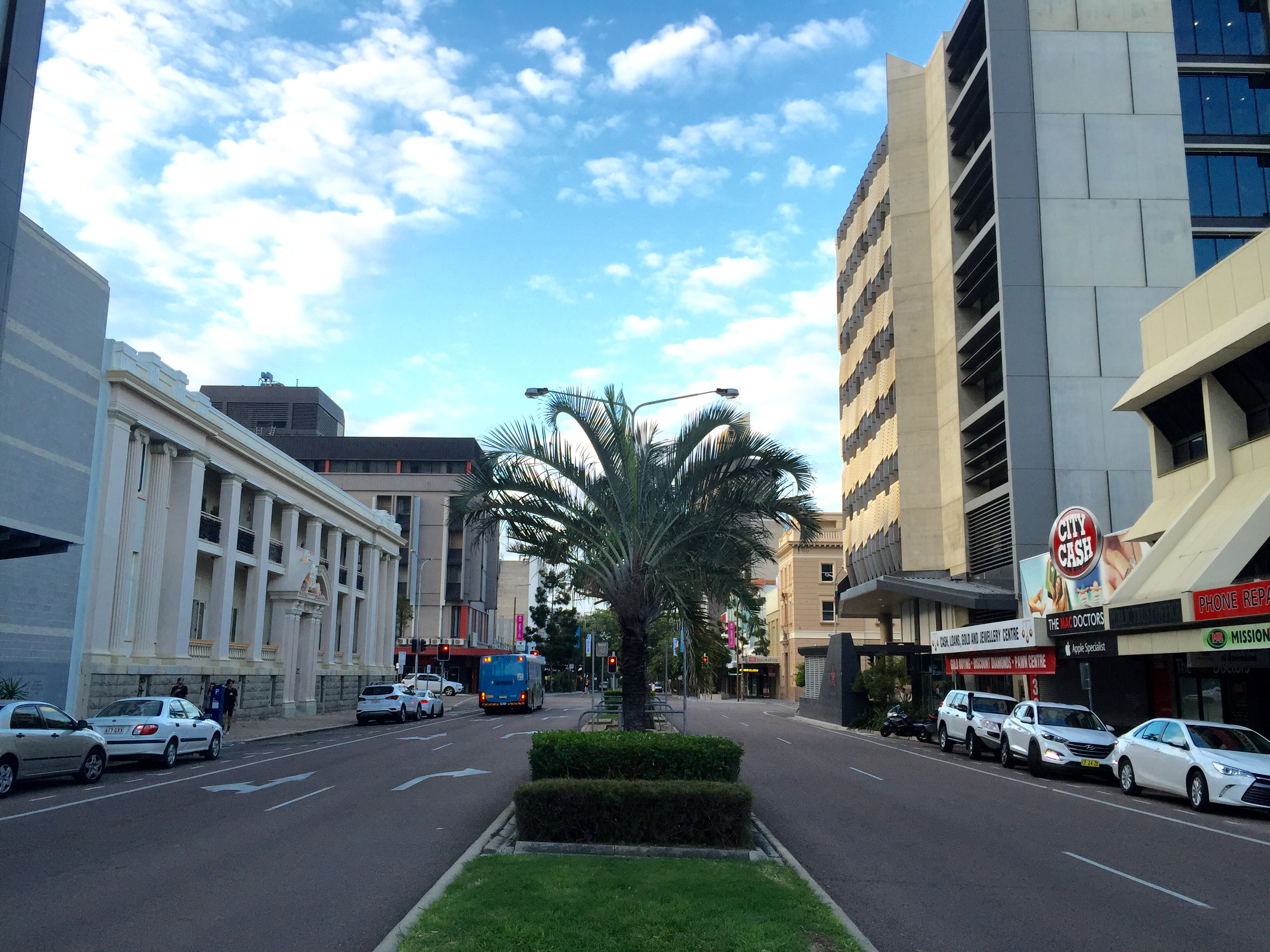
Flinders Street

The city has a diverse economy with strengths in education, healthcare, retail, construction and manufacturing. It is a defence hub and is home to thousands of military personnel. It is also a major manufacturing and processing hub. Townsville is the only city globally to refine three different base metals — zinc, copper, and nickel. Nickel ore is imported from Indonesia, the Philippines and New Caledonia and processed at the Yabulu Nickel refinery, 30 kilometres (19 mi) north of the port. Zinc ore is transported by rail from the Cannington Mine, south of Cloncurry, for smelting at the Sun Metals refinery south of Townsville. Copper concentrate from the smelter at Mount Isa is also railed to Townsville for further refining at the copper refinery at Stuart.. The zinc refinery is one of the world's largest with an expansion from 2019.

Townsville has several large public assets as a result of its relative position and population. These include the largest campus of the oldest university in northern Queensland, James Cook University, the Australian Institute of Marine Science headquarters, Great Barrier Reef Marine Park Authority, the large Army base at Lavarack Barracks, and RAAF Base Townsville.

== Demographics ==
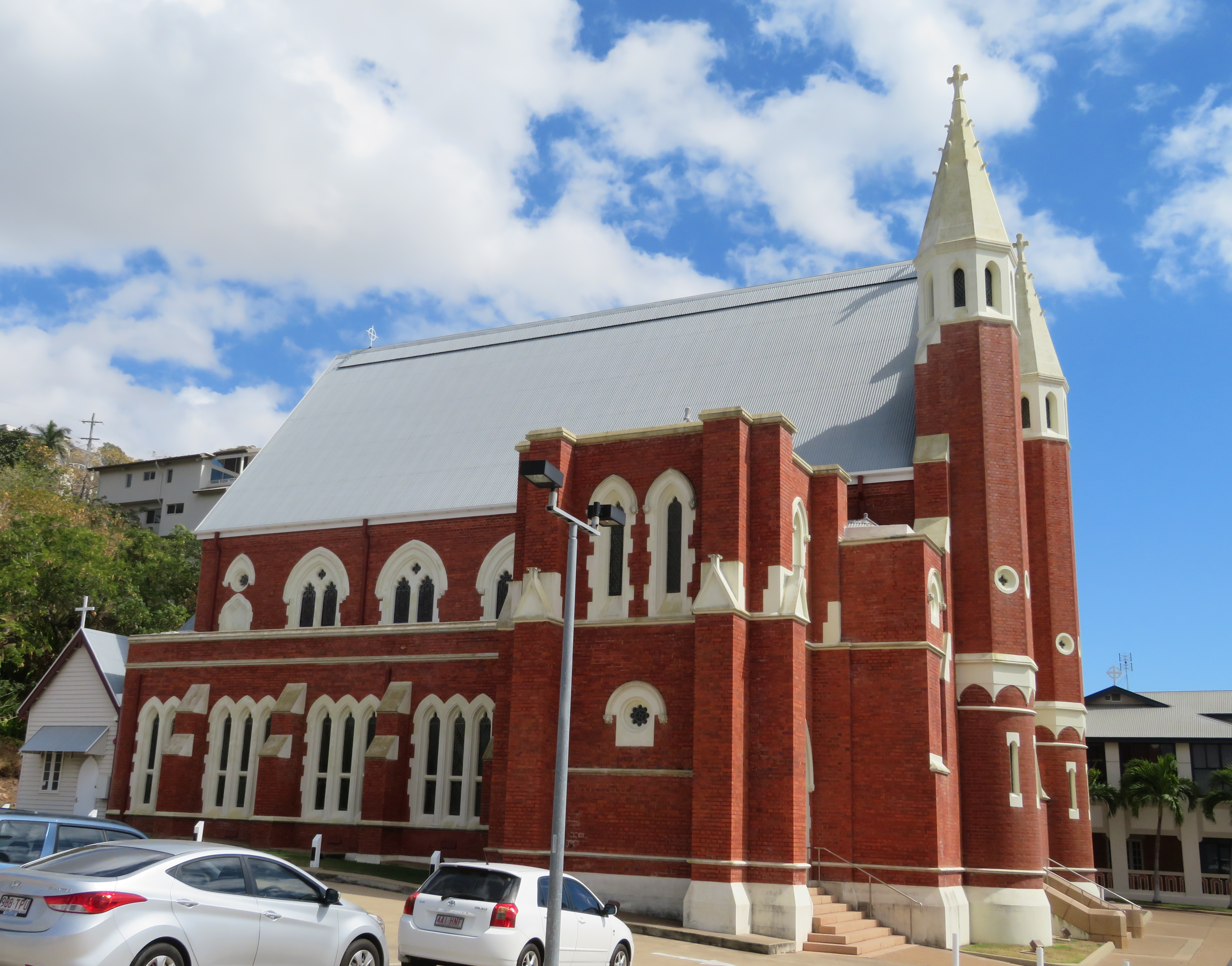
Sacred Heart Cathedral

Townsville's population was 179,011 at the 2021 census. The city has a younger population than the Australian and Queensland averages. The city has traditionally experienced a high turnover of people, with the army base and government services bringing in many short to medium term workers. The region has also become popular with mine workers on fly in/fly out contracts.

In 2021, 9.0% of Townsville's population was of Aboriginal or Torres Strait islander descent. In 2021, there were 21,180 people of Aboriginal or Torres Strait islander descent living in Townsville.

== Education ==
There are over 60 private and state schools of primary and secondary education within the Townsville area. Townsville Grammar School is the oldest co-educational school on the Australian mainland. The Townsville State High School opened on 7 June 1924 and The Cathedral School of St Anne & St James opened in 1917.

=== Universities ===
James Cook University (JCU) is a public university based in Townsville. Established in 1970, the main campus is located in the suburb of Douglas. JCU was the second university in Queensland and the first in North Queensland. The University has a strong and internationally recognised expertise in marine & tropical biology. The JCU Medical School was established in 1999 and is linked with the adjacent tertiary-level Townsville Hospital. The Veterinary Sciences undergraduate facility is the newest in Australia.

CQUniversity first established a presence in Townsville in 2014 with the opening of a Distance Education Study Centre in the CBD. The University quickly felt the demand for a face-to-face teaching presence in Townsville and has since opened a purpose built campus in the city offering many on-campus courses including nursing, paramedic science, business and psychology as well as supporting growing numbers of online students.

=== Vocational education ===
The city is home to the Pimlico and Aitkenvale campuses of TAFE Queensland North — a Technical and Further Education College, a campus of Queensland Agricultural Training Colleges, and Tec-NQ.

== Culture, events and festivals ==
The city is home to the Townsville Saint, a 6 m (20 ft) stick figure depicting The Saint on the northern cliff face of Castle Hill, painted by seven first-year University College of Townsville (which would later become James Cook University) students on St Patrick’s Day, 17 March 1962. The figure went on to survive numerous attempts at removal. On 28 May 1993, The Saint became integrated with the heritage significance of the hill as a natural and cultural landmark. In 2013, the Townsville City Council won legal ownership of The Saint as a trademark, protecting its use by the wider community. The mystery of who painted the figure was revealed on the 40th anniversary (2002) to be Graeme Bowen, Lyall Ford, Rodney Froyland, David Greve, Peter Higgins, Barrie Snarski and Robert Sothman. While adopted by the University from the beginning, The Saint has become iconic, surviving opposition and attempts at removal.

The Australian Festival of Chamber Music was an international chamber music festival held over ten days each July in Townsville. The festival has ran between 1991 and 2025, and attracted many acclaimed international and Australian musicians. Due to lack of performing arts infrastructure, the Festival relocated to Cairns in 2026. Townsville also has its own orchestra, the Barrier Reef Orchestra, which presents concerts throughout North Queensland. The Townsville Entertainment Centre, seating more than 5,000 people, is host to many national and international music shows, as well as sporting and trade shows.

The region has many renowned festivals, many which celebrate the international heritage of many that call North Queensland home. The Annual Greek, Italian and Indian Festivals are popular with the locals and tourists alike. The Stable on the Strand is celebrated each Christmas.

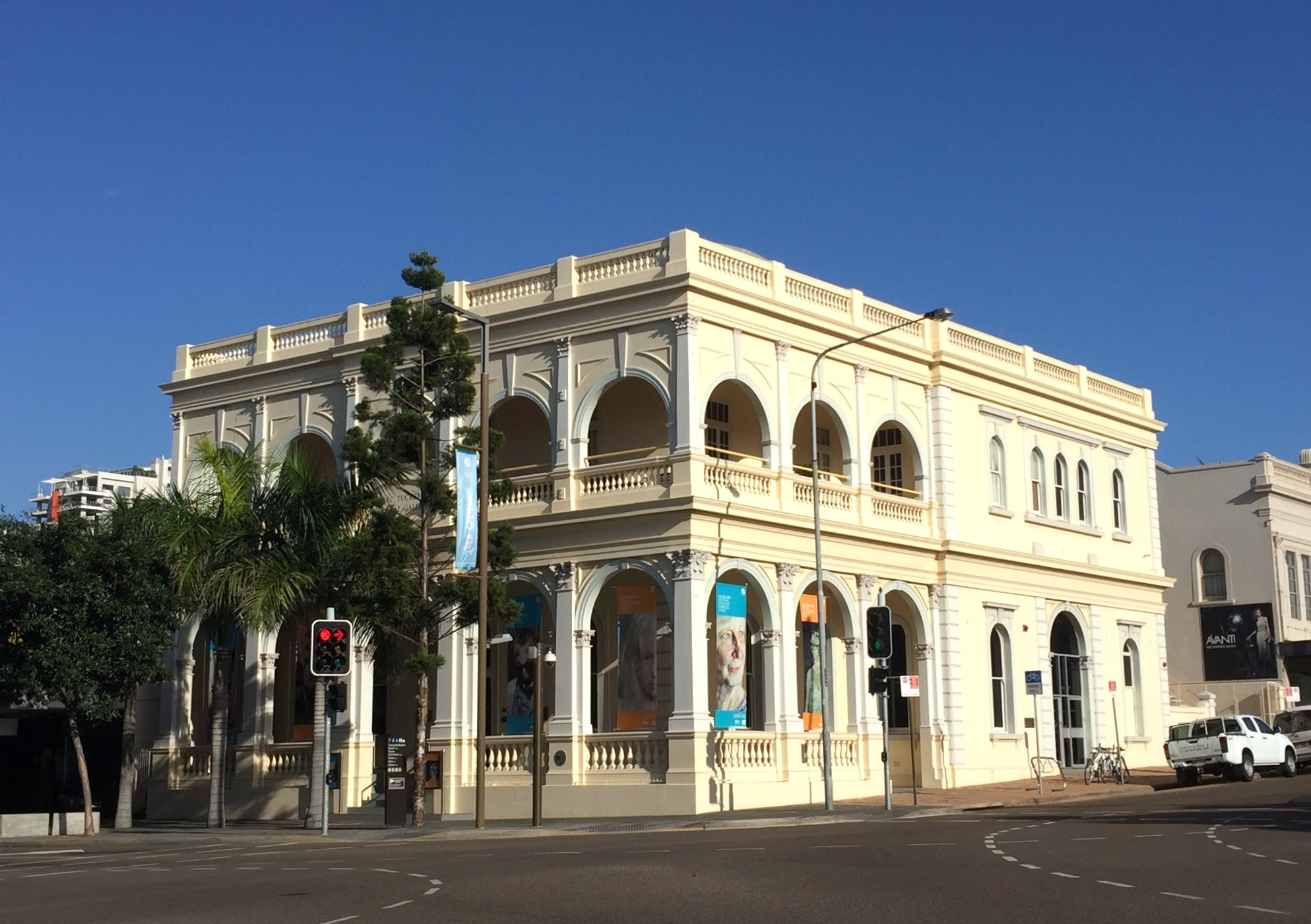
Perc Tucker Regional Gallery

The Townsville Civic Theatre is North Queensland's premier cultural facility. Since its opening in 1978, the Theatre has been a centre of entertainment and performing arts, providing an environment to further develop the performing arts in Townsville and the North. TheatreiNQ is an independent professional theatre company based in Townsville, presenting four shows a year including the popular annual Shakespeare Under the Stars in Queen Gardens. Dancenorth Australia is a contemporary dance company based in Townsville, whose works tour all over Australia and the World. Dancenorth is the only performing arts organisation based in regional Queensland to be included in the Australian Government's National Performing Arts Partnership Framework.

The Perc Tucker Regional Gallery is the public art gallery of Townsville. Located on the eastern end of Flinders Mall, the Gallery focuses on artwork relevant to North Queensland and the Tropics. Every second September the gallery presents sculpture artworks and art festival called Strand Ephemera, exhibited over the two kilometre beachfront strip. The City is also home to Umbrella Studios who regularly exhibit and promote the work of artists from the region.

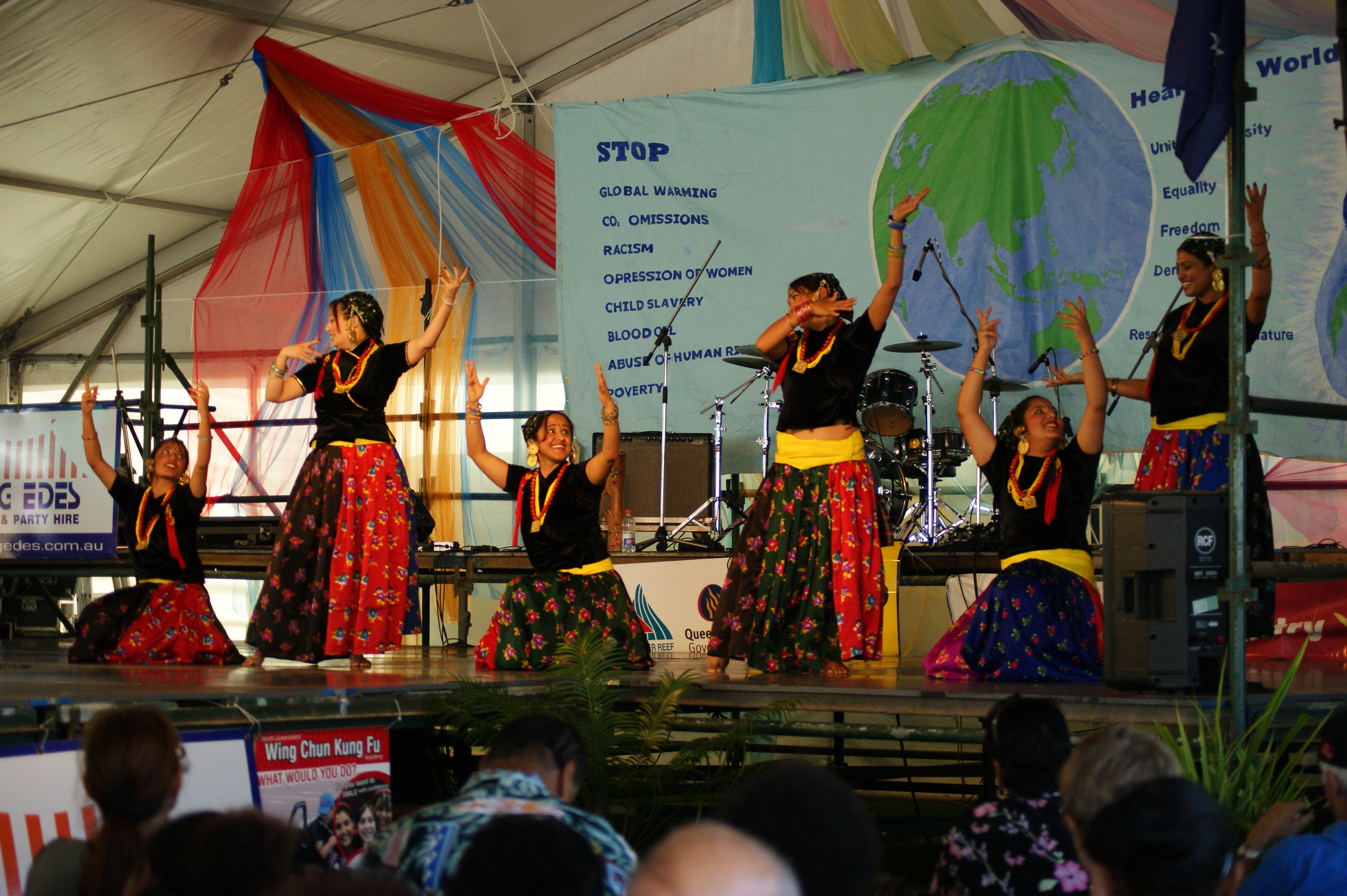
Cultural Fest in the Strand

The Townsville City Council and Townsville Intercultural Centre annually organises Cultural Fest in mid August. The festival has been held in various locations across the city over its history, and is currently held on the grounds of James Cook University. The Cultural Fest showcases the cultural diversity of the city and dance, food, and music from different ethnic groups in the region.

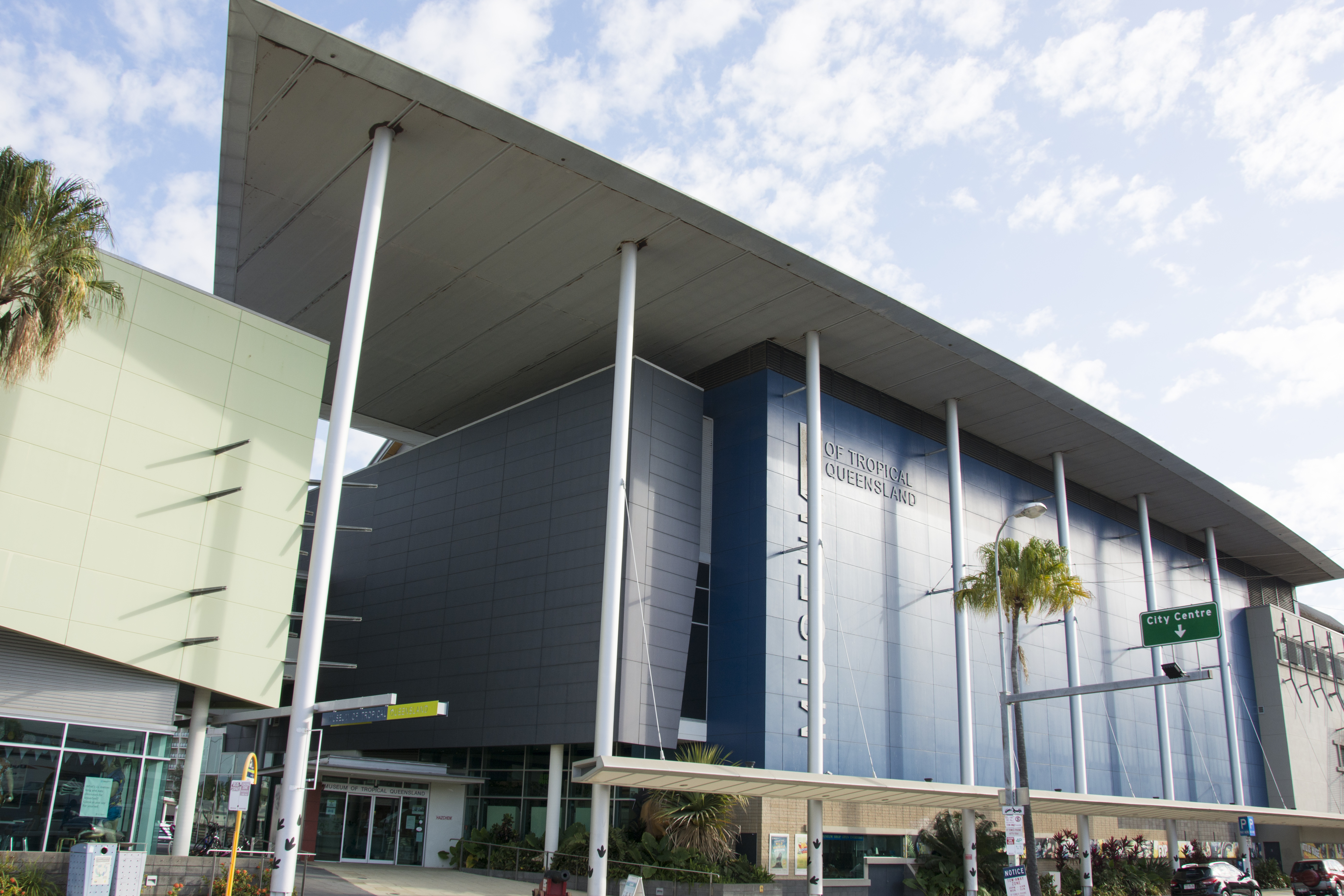
Museum of Tropical Queensland

The city has several museums. The Maritime Museum of Townsville, also known as the Townsville Maritime Museum, is located as part of the Port of Townsville. Its features include HMAS Townsville, SS Yongala, and lenses from current and former lighthouses. The Museum of Tropical Queensland (abbreviated MTQ) is a museum of natural history, archaeology and history. In addition to housing artifacts from the wrecks, the museum administers the shipwreck sites for HMS Pandora and SS Yongala. The Museum of Underwater Art (MOUA) features the work of underwater sculptor Jason deCaires Taylor, including the coral greenhouse at John Brewer Reef and the ocean siren at The Strand.

The city has many restaurants, concentrated on Palmer Street in South Townsville, Flinders Street and along the Strand. The city also has a vibrant pub and night-club scene, many of them located in Flinders Street East.

== Architecture ==
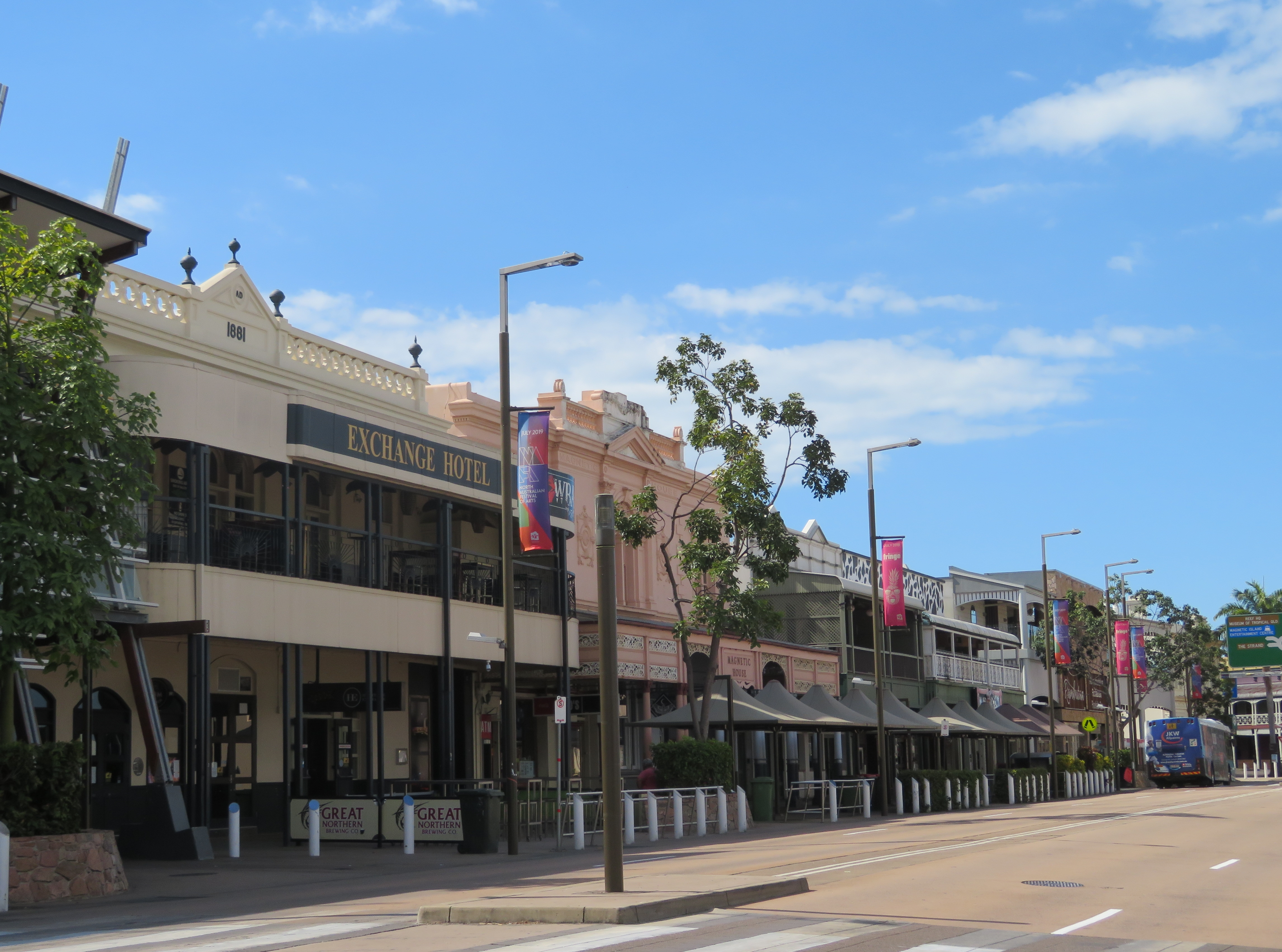
19th century buildings on Flinders Street, the oldest street

There are many well-preserved old buildings in Townsville dating from the 19th and the beginning of the 20th centuries, especially in Flinders Street which is the oldest street. One of the most famous buildings is the Townsville Post Office, built in 1886 with a clock tower which was dismantled in 1942 and reconstructed in 1963/64. Another sightworthy building is the Australian Joint Stock Bank which was built 1887–88. Tattersalls Hotel which was built as early as 1864, the former Bank of New South Wales dating from 1887 and the former Bank of Australasia built in 1905 are sightworthy historic buildings as well. The Australian Joint Stock Bank (1887–88), the Townsville Technical College dating from 1920/21, the Westpac Bank Building (1935) and the Great Northern Hotel with its large balconies which was completed in 1901 are worth a visit as well. The former Main Train Station opposite the Great Northern Hotel was built 1910–1913 and inaugurated on 24 December 1913.

One of the most impressive churches of Townsville is Sacred Heart Roman Catholic Cathedral which was built 1896–1902. St. James' Anglican Cathedral was built in two stages 1887–1892 and 1959–1960.

== Parks ==
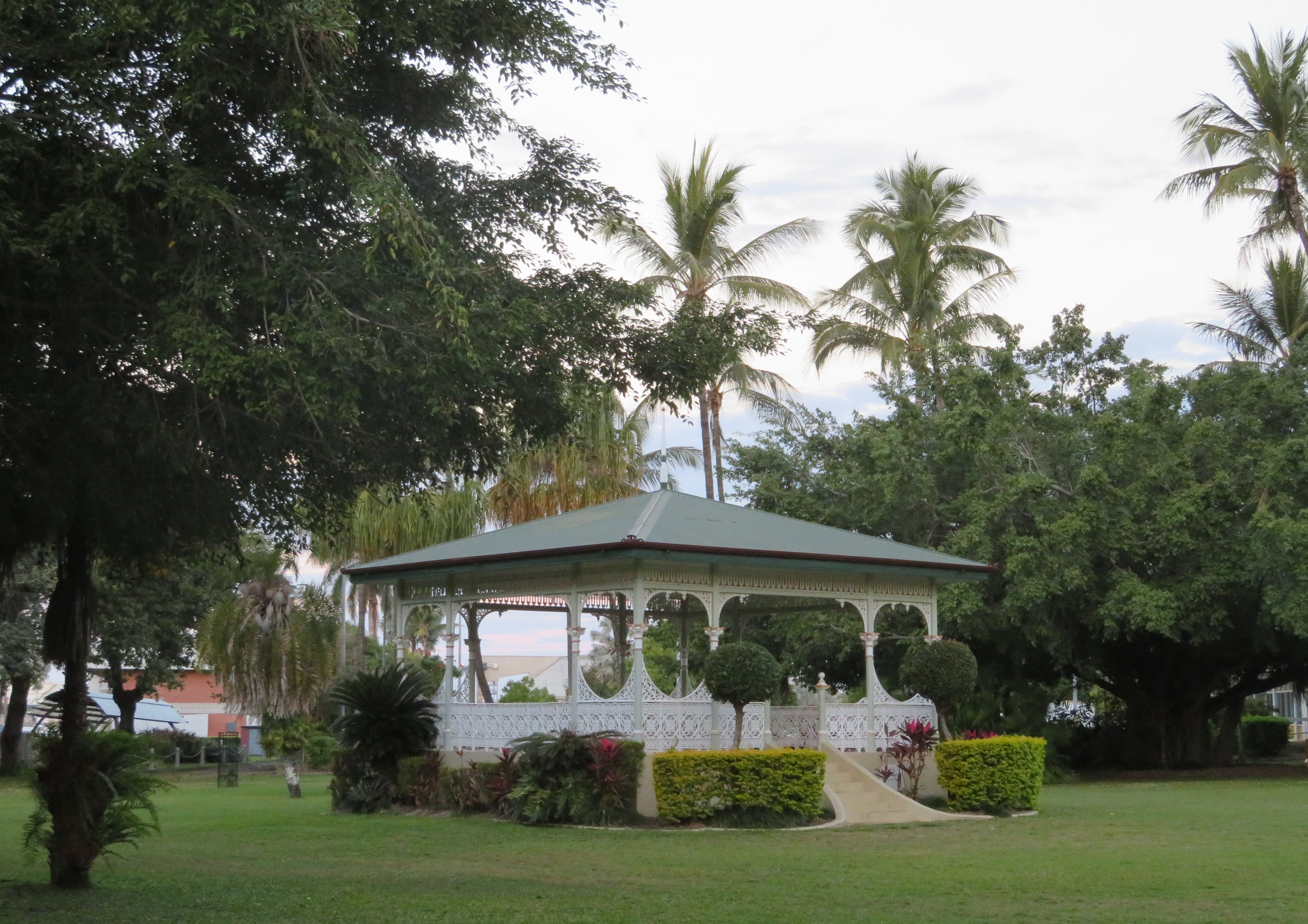
Bandstand (1913) in Anzac Memorial Park

Queens Gardens, laid out in 1870 in the Northern part of Townsville cover an area of 4 ha (9.9 acres). Originally they were a part of a botanical garden of 100 acres (40 ha) dedicated to the experimentation and propagation of tropical plants like breadfruit, mahogany, coffee and mangoes.

The Strand is considered the most popular park of Townsville. In 1950, Tobruk Memorial Baths were inaugurated here. The Strand is known for its Rock Pool and for various cultural events which take place here.

Anderson Park covering an area of about 20 ha in the district of Mundingburra is mainly known for its ferns and pandanus. The park is named after William Andersen (1845–1935), the first curator of parks of the city. The park was laid out in 1929. Its design was prepared in 1962 by Allan Wilson, Superintendent of parks from 1959 to 1969.

Townsville Palmetum, a park covering an area of 17 ha with about 300 species of plants, was inaugurated in the South of Townsville in 1988. Most of the 60 species of palms which are native to Australia can be seen here.

The first park in the city centre which was named Anzac Memorial Park later was laid out as early as 1912. A bandstand was built in the middle of the park in 1913.

== Media and communications ==
Townsville is the media centre for North Queensland, with four commercial and five narrowcast radio stations, North Queensland ABC radio station, three commercial television stations, one regional daily newspaper and one community weekly newspaper (both owned by News Ltd). There are no local Sunday papers although The Sunday Mail (Qld) — based in Brisbane — does have a North Queensland edition. Media distributed on the World Wide Web include the Townsville Bulletin.

== Sport and recreation ==
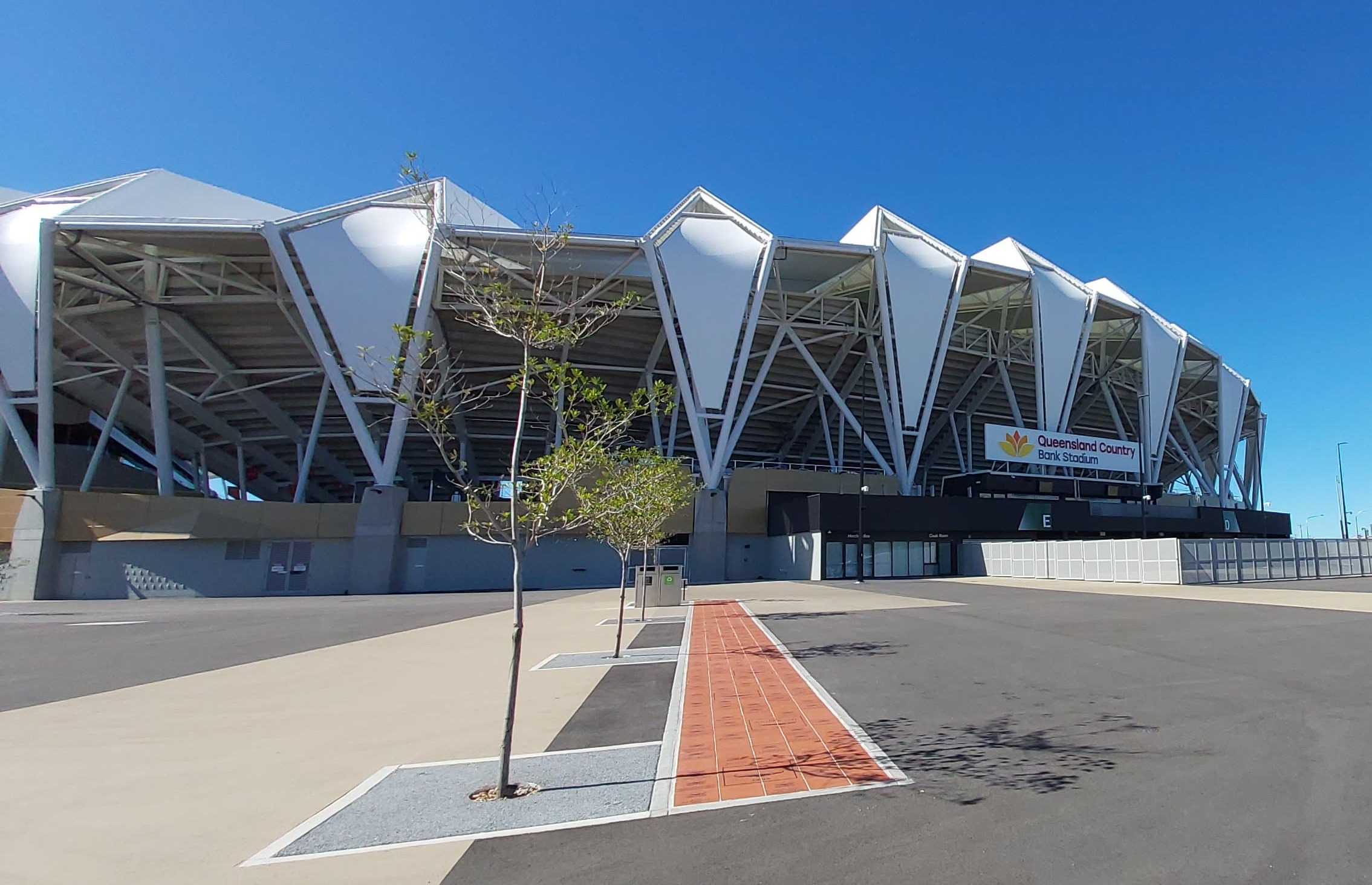
North Queensland Stadium

Townsville hosts several sporting teams that participate in national competitions. These include the North Queensland Cowboys (National Rugby League), who play at Queensland Country Bank Stadium and the Townsville Fire (Women's National Basketball League) who play at the Townsville RSL Stadium. The city also formerly hosted the Townsville Crocodiles, (National Basketball League) who played out of the Townsville Entertainment Centre, known as The Swamp during Crocs home games.

Queensland Country Bank Stadium is the home ground for the Cowboys. It replaced the Willows Sports Complex. The Willows Sports Complex was an official venue for the 2003 Rugby Union World Cup, with three matches played in Townsville. Townsville hosted the popular Japanese national rugby union team. Tony Ireland Stadium, in the suburb of Thuringowa, has an international standard cricket and AFL stadium. Townsville was a host city for the preliminary rounds of the men's (Pool B) and women's (pool A) Basketball competition for the 2018 Gold Coast Commonwealth Games.

The most popular sport in Townsville is rugby league. In addition to the Cowboys in the NRL, Townsville and its surrounding suburbs host a number of local junior and senior rugby league sides in the successful Townsville District Rugby League, including A-grade sides: Brothers Townsville, Norths Devils, Souths, Western Lions and Centrals ASA Tigers. The local league has produced a number of Australian internationals such as Gorden Tallis and Gene Miles.

Touch Football in Townsville is run by Townsville Touch Football, with regular competitions conducted at Queens Park in North Ward. The Colliers Shield is the city's major touch football competition and is contested through the winter months by seven touch football clubs. The city has produced a host of regional, state and national representative players and officials, including 2024 Ron Hanson Medallist Kelly Kennedy, who is the cities most capped international touch football player. In 2010, the city played host to the 6th Masters Trans-Tasman Test Series between Australia and New Zealand, which was held at Queens Park from 11-13 June, marking the first time the two countries had played against each other in the sport's Masters divisions (aged 30 and over) outside a World Cup since 1991. From 2018 until 2020, the city was home to the North Queensland Cowboys NRL Touch Premiership teams, which competed in the now-defunct national-level competition and played home games at Willows Sports Complex.

Townsville and Districts Rugby Union run a successful Winter Junior and Senior Rugby Union competition including teams from Ingham, Charters Towers and Ayr. Townsville has produced a number of members of the Australia national rugby union team (the Wallabies) in the past including Peter Grigg and Sam Scott-Young.

Several Australian Test and ODI cricketers have come out of Townsville including fast bowler Mitchell Johnson, Andrew Symonds and James Hopes. In 2012 Townsville hosted under 19 cricket World Cup preliminary matches, semi finals and the final featuring Australia and India.

Townsville is also home to Football Queensland North. Soccer is played by junior participants in the city. Major clubs include MA Olympic, Brothers Townsville, and Saints Eagles Souths FC.

AFL Townsville operate a regional Australian rules football league in the region. Jake Spencer is the first local player to play in the AFL.

The Townsville Running Festival is an annual event organised by the Townsville Road Runners that began with the first Townsville Marathon in 1972 and now also includes several shorter fun runs.

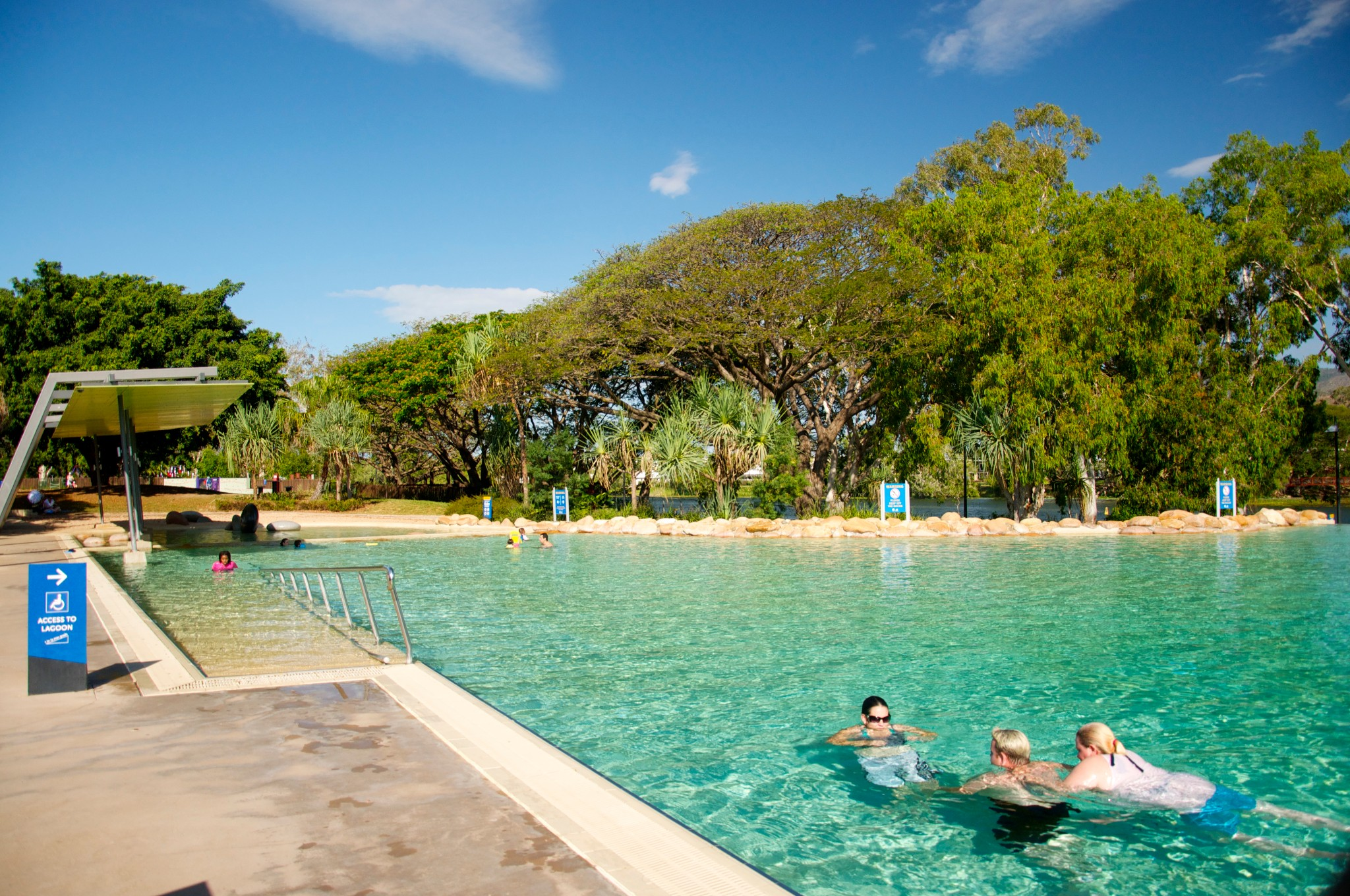
One of Riverway's swimming lagoons, a free swimming and recreation area.

Townsville is hosting the World Triathlon Multisport World Championships from 15 to 25 August 2024.

The Reid Park Street Circuit is located in Reid Park. Each July since 2009, it hosts the Townsville 400 for the Supercars Championship.

Townsville also has a go cart track and motocross track; Townsville had a 1/4-mile dragstrip, but it closed its gates on 25 August 2012 due to urban development.

Rowing occurs at Townsville & JCU Rowing Club and Riverway Rowing Club. Both clubs cater to competitive masters, social, learn to row and school-based rowing programs. In 2009 the Townsville & JCU club won its first Queensland Club Premiership and in 2010 Riverway club claimed theirs.

Townsville has 3 Tennis Clubs. The Western Suburbs Tennis Club Inc., Tennis Townsville Inc. and Kalynda Chase Tennis Centre. Each year Tennis Townsville host the NQ Open Championships and Western Suburbs Tennis Club host the Townsville Open. These tournaments see Australian and international players competing for up to $10,000 prize money and the opportunity to improve their Australian Tennis Ranking.

Townsville Speedway is a speedway venue located at the Townsville Showground on Showgrounds Road, off Ingham Road. It has also been used for motorcycle speedway and has hosted important events, including the Australian qualifying round of the Speedway World Championship in 1990 and the final of the Queensland Solo Championship on four occasions.

== Infrastructure ==
=== Health ===
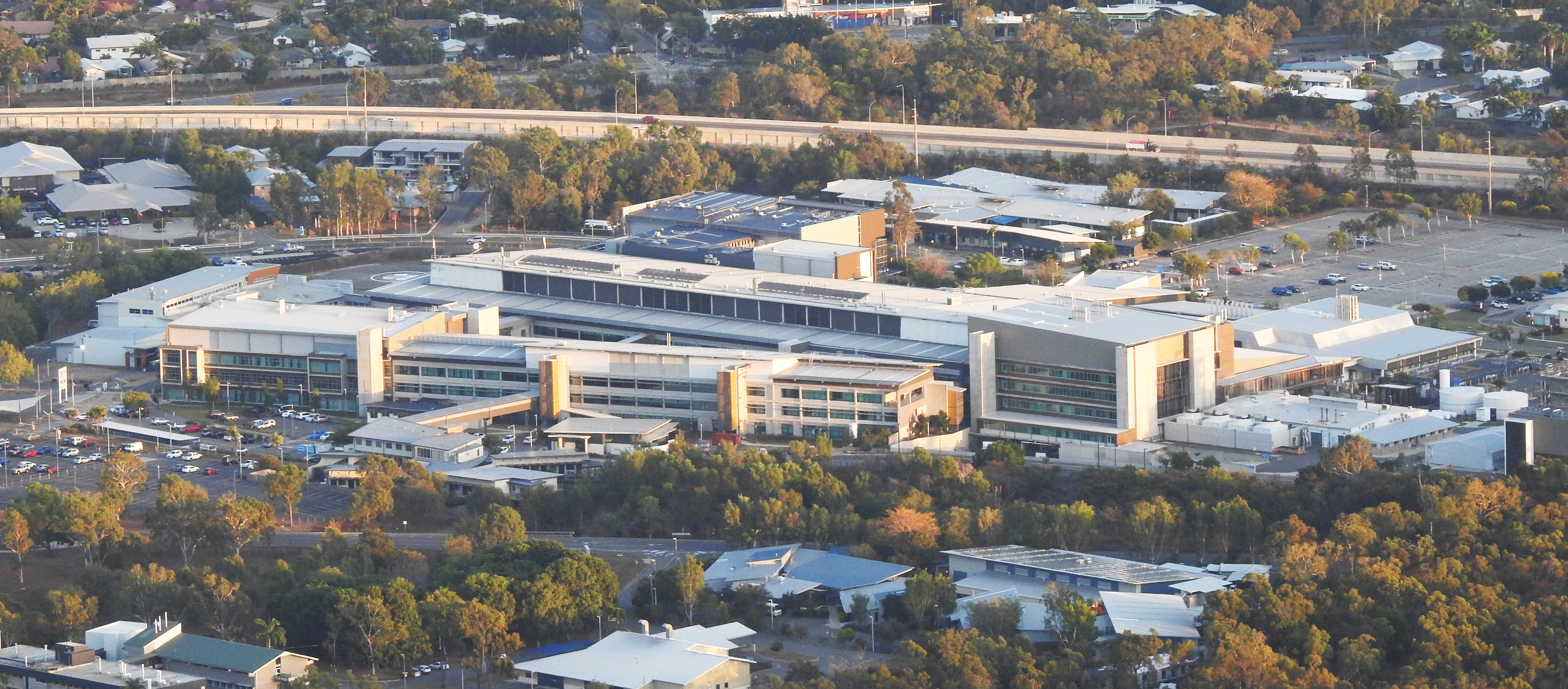
Townsville Hospital at Douglas, Townsville

The Townsville Hospital is a 580-bed university teaching hospital in the suburb of Douglas. The Townsville Hospital was formally located in North Ward whose main building serves an example of the Streamline Moderne style of architecture. It is co-located with the James Cook University School of Medicine. The hospital caters for the city of Townsville, as well as people in the north as far as Thursday Island and Papua New Guinea, west to Mount Isa and south to Sarina. During the year 2010, the hospital admitted 54,941 patients, and had 60,676 presentations to the emergency department. The hospital is also the major tertiary maternity centre, with 2,308 babies delivered in 2010.

The Townsville Hospital underwent a $437 million redevelopment as of 2011, delivering an additional 100 beds, a four-storey expanded Emergency Department, expanded Neonatal Intensive Care Unit, and expansion of oncology services. The Emergency Department will be the largest in Queensland.

There are four other public health campuses in Townsville: the Kirwan Health Campus, the Magnetic Island Health Service Centre, the North Ward Health Campus and the Townsville Hospital Dentist, located in North Ward.

In addition there are two private hospitals in Townsville, the Mater Hospital and the Mater Women's and Children's Hospital.

=== Transport ===
Townsville is the intersection point of the A1 (Bruce Highway), and the A6 (Flinders Highway) National Highways. The Townsville Ring Road, planned to become part of the re-routed A1 route bypass, circumnavigates the city.

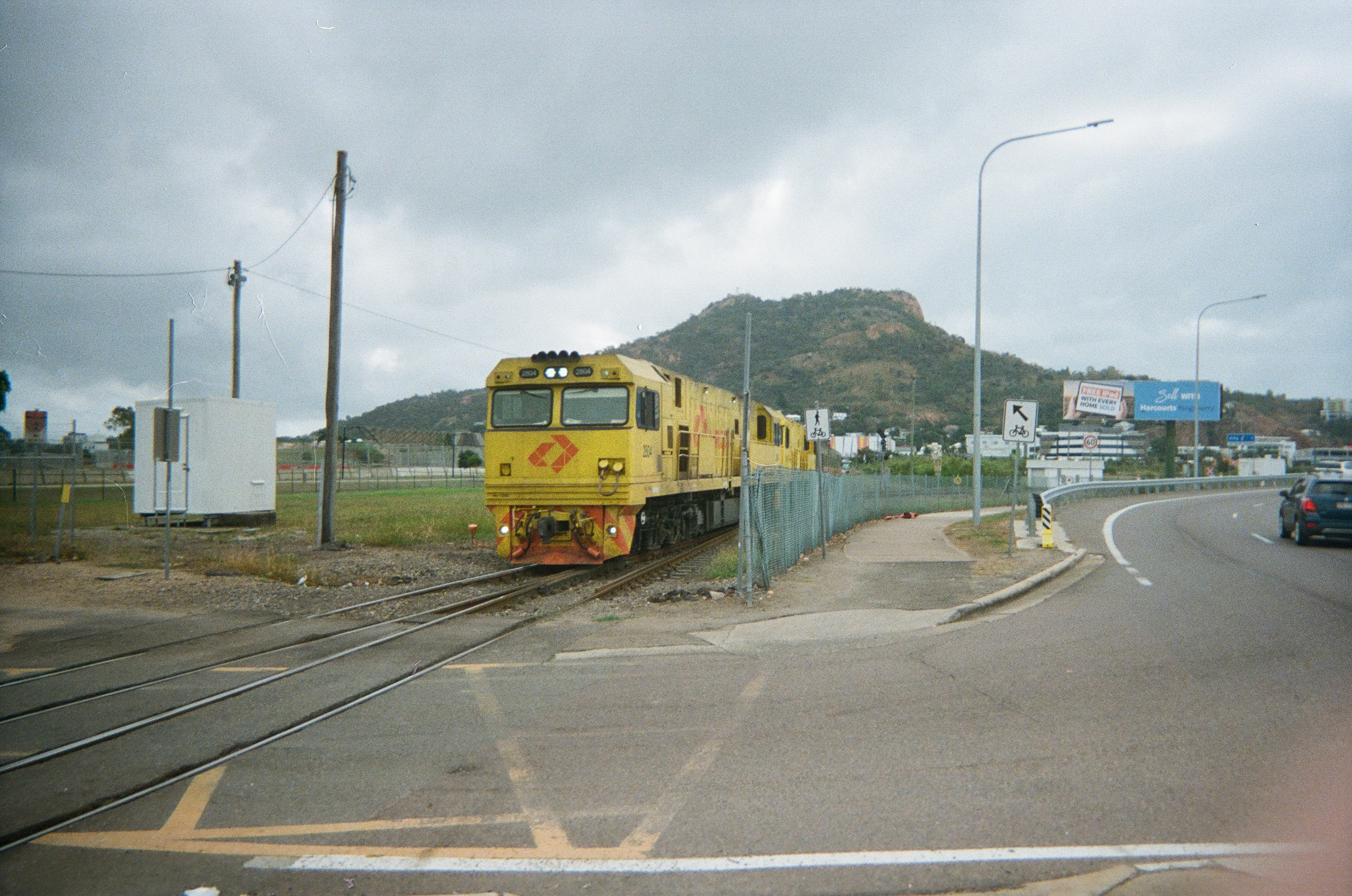
The biweekly Inlander train service departing Townsville at the start of its 21 hour journey to Mount Isa

Townsville has a public transport system contracted to Translink, which provides regular services between many parts of the city. Public transport is also available from the CBD to Bushland Beach. Regular ferry and vehicular barge services operate to Magnetic Island and Palm Island.

Construction of railways in the area of Townsville started as early as 1879, and the first railway line was inaugurated in 1880. The line to Mount Isa which is used by The Inlander today was inaugurated in 1929. The railway lines to Cairns and Brisbane which are used by the Spirit of Queensland were inaugurated in 1929 as well. The former train station, a very representative building at the end of Flinders Street, was completed in 1913. The present train station of Townsville was opened in 2003.

The Tilt Train service connects Townsville railway station to Brisbane in the south and Cairns in the north. Townsville is a major destination and generator of rail freight services. The North Coast railway line, operated by Queensland Rail, meets the Western line in the city's south. Container operations are also common and the products of the local nickel and copper refineries, as well as minerals from the western line (Mount Isa), are transported to the port via trains. The Port of Townsville has bulk handling facilities for importing cement, nickel ore and fuel, and for exporting sugar and products from North Queensland's mines. The port has three sugar-storage sheds, with the newest being the largest under-cover storage area in Australia.

The city is served by Townsville International Airport. The Airport handles direct domestic flights to Darwin, Brisbane, Sydney, Melbourne, as well as direct regional flights to destinations such as Cairns, Mackay, Mount Isa, Rockhampton and Toowoomba. Airlines currently servicing the airport include Qantas, Virgin Australia, Jetstar, Regional Express, Qantaslink and Airnorth.

== Military facilities ==
The Australian Army's 3rd Brigade is based at Lavarack Barracks in Townsville. It is a light infantry brigade consisting of two battalions, the 1st and 3rd Battalions of the Royal Australian Regiment (1 and 3 RAR), along with a cavalry contingent, the 2nd Cavalry Regiment.

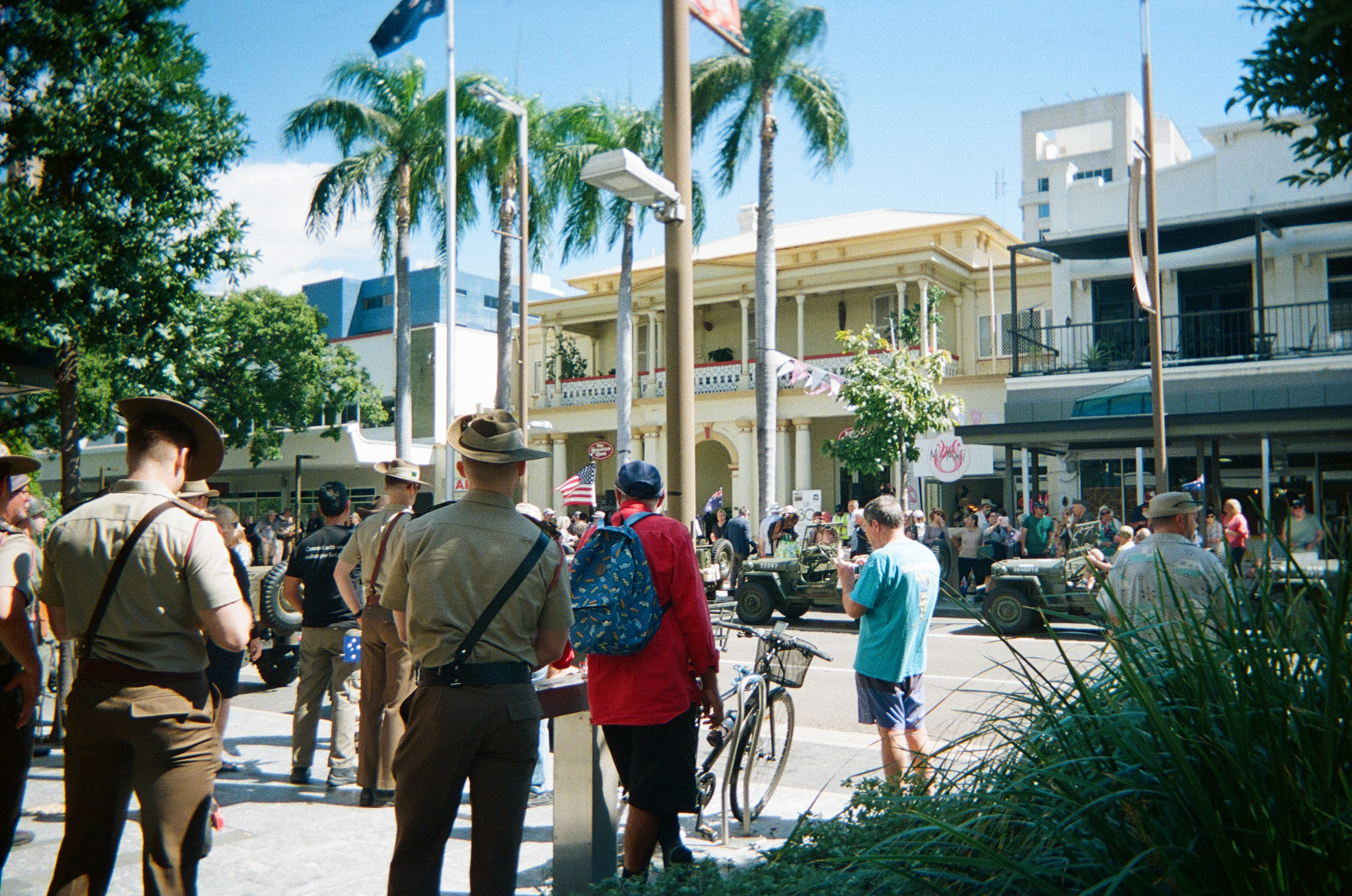
Victory in the Pacific 80th anniversary commemorations (VP80) held on Flinders Street in August 2025

In addition to the 3rd Brigade, other major units based in Townsville include the 5th Aviation Regiment, equipped with MRH-90 and Chinook helicopters, co-located at the RAAF Base in Garbutt and the 10th Force Support Battalion based at Ross Island.

The Army also maintains an Army Reserve brigade in Townsville designated the 11th Brigade. This formation is similar in structure to the 3rd Brigade, in that it has reserve soldiers only. There were also two active cadet units, 130 ACU located within Heatley Secondary College and 15 ACU located on Lavarack Barracks as of 2010, previously located at Ignatius Park College.

The Royal Australian Air Force's RAAF Base Townsville, in the suburb of Garbutt, houses the Beech KingAir 350 aircraft from No. 38 Squadron RAAF. This unit operated the DHC-4 Caribou aircraft until late 2009; it re-equipped in the short term while protracted analysis for a more appropriate Battlefield Transport and Utility aircraft continued. This detachment provides support to the Army units in Townsville. The base is also a high readiness Defence asset and is prepared to accept the full range of RAAF aircraft types and other international aircraft.

Townsville is also the staging point for the movement of personnel and materials to the remote parts of Northern Australia and many overseas locations.

== Sister cities ==
Townsville's sister cities are:

- Port Moresby, Papua New Guinea
- Shūnan, Yamaguchi, Japan
- Iwaki, Fukushima, Japan
- Changshu, Jiangsu, China
- Suwon, Gyeonggi, South Korea
- Foshan, Guangdong, China

== Notable people ==
=== Athletes ===
- Jarrod Bannister (1984–2018), Australian athlete and Olympian
- Glenn Buchanan (born 1962), Australian Olympic butterfly swimmer
- Lizette Cabrera (born 1997), Australian International Tennis Player
- Tom Chester (born 2001), Australian rugby league player
- Brett Clarke (born 1972), Australian Olympic table tennis player
- Natalie Cook (born 1975), Australian Olympic beach volleyball player
- Mervyn Crossman (1935–2017), Australian Olympic field hockey player
- Daisy D'Arcy (born 2002), Australian rules footballer
- Tony David (born 1967), professional darts champion
- Renita Farrell-Garard (born 1972), Australian hockey player and dual Olympic gold medalist
- Dennis Firestone (born 1944), Australian racing driver
- Helen Gray (born 1956), Australian Olympic swimmer
- Tom Green (born 2001), Australian rules footballer
- Peter Grigg, Australian rugby union player
- Josh Hall (born 1990), Australian rules footballer
- Rob Hammond (born 1981), Australian field hockey player
- Ellie Hampson (born 2001), Australian rules footballer
- Jarrod Harbrow (born 1988), Australian rules footballer
- Lesleigh Harvey (born 1960), Australian Olympic swimmer
- Valentine Holmes (born 1995), Australian Rugby League player
- James Hopes (born 1978), Australian cricketer
- Josh Jenkins (born 1989), Basketballer and Australian rules footballer
- Corey Jensen (born 1994), Australian rugby league player
- Mitchell Johnson (born 1981), Australian cricketer
- Breanna Koenen (born 1994), Australian rules footballer
- Laurie Lawrence (born 1941), Australian Olympic swimming coach
- Summer Lochowicz (born 1978), Australian Olympic beach volleyball player
- James Mason (born 1947), Australian Olympic field hockey player
- Luke McLean (born 1987), Italian Australian Rugby Union footballer
- Gene Miles (born 1959), Australian rugby league footballer
- Jack Miller (born 1995), Australian MotoGP rider
- Danny Moore, (born 1971), Australian rugby league player
- Greg Norman (born 1955), former golf world number one
- Aaron Payne (born 1982), Australian Rugby League player
- Russell Perry (born 1938), Australian Olympic weightlifter
- John-Patrick Smith (born 1989), Australian tennis player
- Braydon Preuss (born 1995), Australian rules footballer
- Sam Scott-Young, Australian rugby union player
- Gehamat Shibasaki (born 1998), Australian rugby league player
- Jamal Shibasaki (born 2005), Australian rugby league player
- Jake Spencer (born 1989), Australian rules footballer
- Andrew Symonds (1975–2022), Australian cricketer, played for the Wanderers club in Townsville
- Gorden Tallis (born 1973), Australian rugby league footballer
- Sam Thaiday (born 1985), State of Origin and Australian rugby league player
- Pud Thurlow (1903–1975), Australian test cricketer in the 1930s
- Johnathan Thurston (born 1983), first North Queensland Cowboys NRL Premiership winning co/Captain with Matthew Scott
- Adrian Trevilyan (born 2001), Australian rugby league player
- Libby Trickett (née Lenton; born 1985), Australian Olympic swimmer
- Jay Vine (born 1995), Australia road cyclist
- Breiana Whitehead (born 2000), Australian Olympic kitefoiler
- Zaria, professional wrestler

=== Journalists ===
- Julian Assange (born 1971), editor-in-chief of WikiLeaks
- Clem Christesen (1911–2003), journalist and editor of the Australian literary magazine, Meanjin
- Yvonne Sampson (born 1980), Foxtel sports journalist
- John Vause, CNN reporter and anchor

=== Artists ===
- Ben Bennett, Australian singer
- Billy Doolan (born 1952), Australian Indigenous artist
- Gail Mabo (born 1965), Australian Indigenous artist

=== Military personnel ===
- James Cannan (1882–1976), former Australian major general
- Charles Raymond Gurney (1906–1942), Australian aviator
- Air Vice Marshal Ellis Wackett (1901–1984), Australian military aviation pioneer
- Sir Lawrence Wackett (1896–1982), Australian aircraft industry pioneer

=== Lawyers and politicians ===
- Bill Heatley (1920–1971), former Liberal senator
- Patricia Staunton (born 1946), Australian magistrate and former NSW politician
- Russell Skerman (1903–1983), Supreme Court judge

=== Scientists and mathematicians ===
- Joe Baker (1932–2018), marine scientist and rugby league footballer
- Terry Hughes (born 1956), marine biologist specialising in the study of coral reefs
- Helene Marsh (born 1945), environmental scientist, specialising in the study of dugongs
- Ralph Douglas Kenneth Reye (1912–1977), Australian pathologist who first described Reye's syndrome.
- Peter Ridd, physicist and author
- John Veron (born 1945), specialist in the study of corals and reefs
- Edwin C. Webb (1921–2006), Biochemist, Vice-Chancellor of Macquarie University
- Nicole Webster, marine scientist
- William J. Youden (1900–1971), statistician

=== Others ===
- Lyn Ashley (born 1940), actress, daughter of Madge Ryan
- Savannah Bond, pornographic film actress
- Harriet Dyer (born c. 1988), Hollywood film actress
- Rick Farley (1952–2006), Australian activist for Indigenous Australians’ rights and former CEO of the National Farmers Federation
- Rachael Finch (born 1988), Miss Universe Australia 2009 and 3rd runner-up at Miss Universe 2009
- Madge Ryan (1919–1994), Hollywood, Broadway, and British (Witness in the Dark) stage and film actress – (Vide supra, daughter, Lyn Ashley)
- Francis Stuart (1902–2000), Irish writer
- Natalie Weir (born 1967), Australian choreographer
