= Kirwan Health Campus =

Health service in Kirwan, Queensland, Australia

Coordinates: 19°18′14″S 146°43′59″E

Kirwan Health Campus is a health service located in the suburb of Kirwan, Queensland, Australia, and is the main health facility serving residents in the City of Townsville, about 12 kilometres (7 mi) west of the Townsville CBD.

The Kirwan Health Campus offers a range of specialist services and is not an emergency or general hospital, such services are provided out of the Townsville Hospital in nearby Douglas. The Health Campus opened on 21 June 2006 at the former Kirwan Hospital for Women.

Kirwan Health Campus cost $20 million to redevelop, and is staffed by 230 health care professionals that can provide treatment and medical services to more than 150 families each day. This is the largest community health facility in Australia and was officially opened by Health Minister, Stephen Robertson.

Kirwan Health Campus Layout

== Services ==
- Aboriginal and Torres Strait Islander Health Program
- Mental health (including the Child and Youth Mental Health Service)
- Forensic mental health services
- Oral health services, including school-based services
- Rehabilitation and extended treatment
- Aged care
- Home care
- Artificial Limb and Appliance Service
- Home and Community Care Allied Health Outreach team
- Pathology Specimen Collection

== History ==
What is today The Kirwan Health Campus started out as the Kirwan Hospital for woman & children and was the only hospital in what was Thuringowa city. When the government built the New Townsville hospital, the Kirwan Hospital was closed and incorporated into the new Hospital.
Kirwan Woman's & Children's Hospital closed in 2002, to allow the $20 million redevelopment into the Kirwan Health Campus.
