= List of heritage sites in Townsville City, Queensland =

Townsville CBD has many heritage-listed sites, including:

- Castle Hill Road: Castle Hill
- 2–4 Cleveland Terrace: Drystone Wall, Melton Hill
- 20 Cleveland Terrace: The Rocks Guesthouse
- 26 Cleveland Terrace: Warringa
- 36 Cleveland Terrace: St James Cathedral
- 36 Cleveland Terrace: Synod Hall
- Clifton Street: Australian Institute of Tropical Medicine Building
- 87 Flinders Street: Tattersalls Hotel
- 101–111 Flinders Street: Bank of New South Wales
- 104–106 Flinders Street: Queensland Building
- 108–124 Flinders Street: Burns Philp Building
- 143–149 Flinders Street East: First AMP Building (later Magnetic House)
- 173 Flinders Street: Australian Joint Stock Bank Building
- 175 Flinders Street: Queens Building
- 181–183 Flinders Street: Atkinson & Powell Building
- 193 Flinders Street: T. Willmetts & Sons Printery
- 197–203 Flinders Street: Stanton House
- 205–207 Flinders Street: former Commercial Bank of Australia Building (Atinee Building)
- 212–260 Stanley Street: Block A, Townsville Technical College
- 221–223 Flinders Street: Clayton's Apothecaries' Hall
- 224 Flinders Street: Howard Smith Company Building (later Agora House)
- 232–234 Flinders Street: Aplin Brown & Company Building
- 241–245 Flinders Street: Rooney Building
- 247 Flinders Street: Samuel Allen & Sons Building
- 252–270 Flinders Street: former Townsville Post Office (now The Brewery)
- 253–259 Flinders Street: Perc Tucker Regional Gallery
- 272–278 Flinders Street: Commonwealth Bank Building
- 295–303 Flinders Street: Queensland National Bank
- 337–343 Flinders Street: Westpac Bank
- 408–410 Flinders Street: Henlein & Co Building
- 416–418 Flinders Street: Second AMP Building
- 419 Flinders Street: State Government Offices (Flinders Street)
- 500 Flinders Street: Great Northern Hotel
- 502 & 792 Flinders Street: Old Townsville railway station
- 719–741 Flinders Street: Lion Brewery
- 799 Flinders Street: Saints Theodores Greek Orthodox Church
- 21 Lawson Street: Rosebank House
- Stanley Street: Townsville School of Arts
- 266 Stanley Street: Sacred Heart Cathedral
- Stokes Street: Victoria Bridge
- The Strand: Anzac Memorial Park
- The Strand: Queen's Hotel
- The Strand: Tobruk Memorial Baths
- 1–13 Sturt Street: Dalgety Offices
- 35 Sturt Street: Osler House
- 42 Sturt Street: Commonwealth Offices
- 81 Sturt Street: former Townsville Magistrates Court
- 485 Sturt Street: Townsville Masonic Hall
- 513 Sturt Street: Townsville Baptist Church
- Wickham Street: Townsville Customs House
- 12–14 Wickham Street: State Government Offices (Wickham Street)
