= The Rocks Guesthouse =

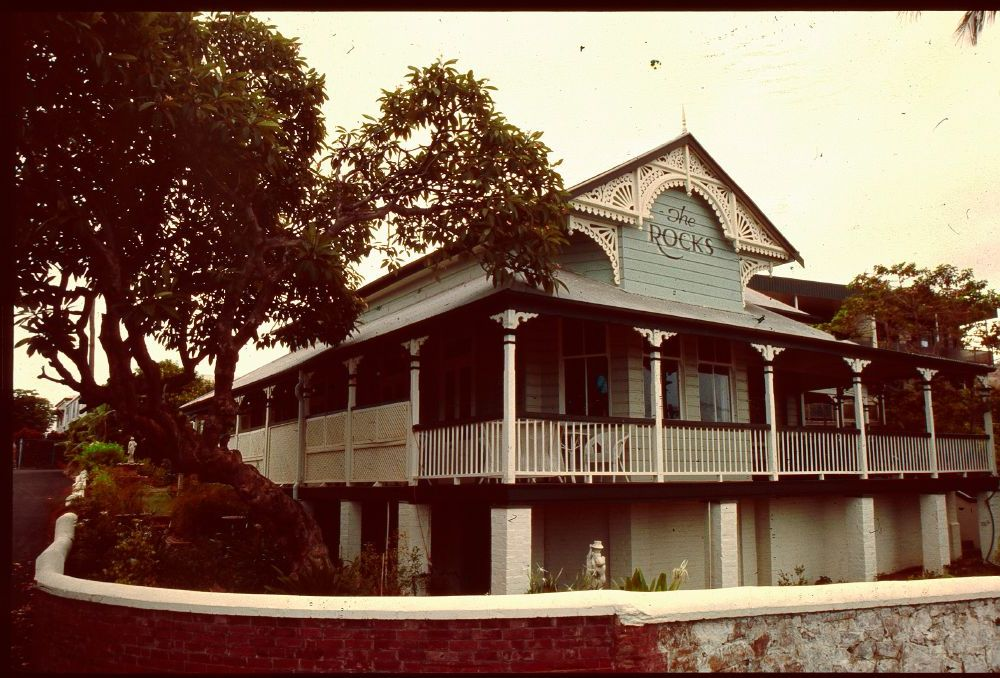
- The Rocks Guesthouse, 2004

- Location within Queensland Location within Australia
- 19.2553°S 146.819°E
- Location: 20 Cleveland Terrace, Townsville CBD, City of Townsville, Queensland, Australia

History
- Design period: 1870s–1890s (late 19th century)
- Built: c. 1897–c. 1934

Site notes
- Architectural style: Classicism

Queensland Heritage Register
- Official name: The Rocks Guesthouse
- Type: state heritage (landscape, built)
- Designated: 10 April 2006
- Reference no.: 602384
- Significant period: 1890s, 1910s, 1930s–1940s (historical)
- Significant components: air raid shelter, views from, guest house, fence/wall – perimeter, residential accommodation – housing, garden/grounds, views to, trees/plantings, theatre – operating, bunker – concrete

The Rocks Guesthouse is a heritage-listed detached house at 20 Cleveland Terrace, Townsville CBD, City of Townsville, Queensland, Australia. It was built from c. 1897 to c. 1934. It was added to the Queensland Heritage Register on 10 April 2006.

== History ==
The Rocks Guesthouse was constructed c. 1897–1900 as a private residence, on land held by Elizabeth Hamilton, wife of pastoralist and prominent publican Frederic Hamilton. Built as an investment, the house was leased to middle class tenants. In 1909 Dr Ernest Humphrey converted it into a private hospital, which it remained until a further conversion in the mid-1930s into a guesthouse. The Rocks continued as "gents only" accommodation throughout World War II, during which it was made safe with the addition of an above-ground air raid shelter. While it has changed hands several times since, it has remained a guesthouse.

The Rocks Guesthouse, is situated in the former grounds of John Melton Black's c. 1864 residence (since demolished), one of the first houses built in Townsville. JM Black arrived in Cleveland Bay in 1864, where he established at Ross Creek a small port to service the inland pastoral run he had taken up in partnership with Robert Towns. Townsville, as it became known, rapidly became one of the most successful ports in north Queensland. By late 1866 it was described as a thriving seaport with considerable trade and commerce facilities such as banks, hotels, stores, businesses and a post office, servicing the burgeoning pastoral properties in the Burdekin and North Kennedy districts. In the 1870s mining to the west provided a major impetus for the rapid growth of Townsville. As sugar growers moved into the coastal plains, a large fleet of vessels, providing export facilities for the sugar industry, was established at Townsville.

In 1882 the Great Northern railway to Charters Towers was opened, with an extension to Ravenswood in 1884. The telegraph line from Townsville to Charters Towers was completed in July 1883 and the first telephone exchange was opened at Townsville during November 1883. By 1900, the economy of the city was soundly based on the mining, pastoral, sugar and transport industries.

About 1864 JM Black had erected his private residence on a prominent hill overlooking the emerging port. In these establishment years Black controlled the affairs of Townsville and when the town became a municipality in early 1866 he was elected as the first Mayor. A year later he resigned and left for Scotland to take up business affairs associated with an inheritance.

Title to his Melton Hill property (allotment 5 of section 3A, containing 6 acres), was held jointly by Towns and Black, but was transferred to Robert Towns in 1867 following Black's departure. In 1870 title was transferred to Shepherd Smith of Sydney, Manager of the Bank of New South Wales. Three years later Smith sub-divided the land into 24 lots. The site containing Black's former house and remaining grounds was situated on subdivisions 5–7 of allotment 5 of section 3a.

The Melton Hill subdivisions attracted the business elite of Townsville. On 25 August 1877, well known squatter, wool provedore, businessman and separationist, Enoch Price Walter Hays, purchased Black's former house and remaining grounds. He leased the house to bank manager H Echlin, until the end of 1884. One year later Hays and his wife moved into Black's former house and they continued to reside there until Hays' death in 1893. Mrs Hays remained here until the property was transferred in 1895 to Elizabeth Hamilton, wife of Frederick Hamilton, pastoralist and publican.

The Hamiltons resided nearly diagonally opposite Mrs Hays, and acquired at least two other properties on Melton Hill in Elizabeth Hamilton's name, and on which they erected investment houses. During the time that the Hamilton family owned the former JM Black residence, it was leased to middle-class tenants.

A second house (later "The Rocks Guesthouse") was constructed in the grounds of JM Black's former residence between c. 1897 and 1900., It was a combined gabled and hipped roof structure consisting of four to five rooms with a central hallway, front verandah covered by a curved corrugated iron awning and a skillion verandah at the rear. The rooms were large and airy with 13-foot-6-inch (4.11 m) high ceilings, picture rails, timber fretwork ceiling roses and interior partitions of tongue-in-groove boards. The main drawing room had a large bay window framed by an arch. The windows were large double-hung timber sashes with two panes per sash. A brick wall along the laneway was also constructed at this time and consists of bricks of similar make and type to the piers of the house. The new house was leased first to George Frazer, manager of the shipping firm Howard Smith and Sons, for two years and then to William Montgomerie.

In 1903 Townsville was hit by Cyclone Leonta, which caused damage to most of the houses on Melton Hill, including the complete destruction of the residence of long term Townsville medical practitioner, Dr Ernest Humphrey.

In 1905 Elizabeth Hamilton died and the property containing Black's former house and the 1897–1900 residence was transferred to Frederic Hamilton. A year later Hamilton sold the whole of the property (both houses) to Dr Ernest Humphrey and his wife, who moved into the c. 1864 residence and continued to let the new house to Montgomerie, who remained there until 1909.

In late 1909 Dr Humphrey converted the c. 1897-1900 residence into a private hospital. Alterations included substantial additions. A corridor led to new rooms at the rear of the building, which included a kitchen, common bathroom and laundry, sterilizing room, operating room and servants' quarters. The operating room and sterilizing room were adjoining and were accessed from the house but the operating room was also accessible externally. This room had three ceiling window lights to allow natural light for operations, Inside, fixed timber vents were situated on the lower third of the room on two sides and closable timber vents were located on the upper level. The lower vents were needed to dissipate the heavy ether used in operations. The front entrance to the hospital was accessed from imposing rendered brick stairs.

The plans for the hospital conversion were approved in August and work was complete by November 1909. Miss I Campbell, Matron of the Townsville General Hospital, was employed to manage the hospital, which was called "The Rocks Private Hospital." It was a modern and well-equipped hospital with a staff of one matron and seven nurses and aides. The nurses were housed in a building constructed at the rear of the block along Herbert Street. This burnt down in the 1970s.

After 15 years operating his hospital and 30 years practicing medicine in Townsville, Dr Humphrey unexpectedly died on 16 September 1925 during a sea voyage south. Mrs Humphrey continued to reside in the family home (the former Black house) until at least 1938, but title to the whole of the Melton Hill property passed to their son Jack on Dr Humphrey's death. In 1926 Jack had subdivisions 5, 6 and 7 re-surveyed to clarify the unusual angle of the allotments resulting from JM Black's former house being built prior to the 1873 subdivisional survey. Notings on the 1926 survey plan indicate a "wood building" and "brick wall" on the hospital site.

It appears that The Rocks continued to operate as a private hospital, managed by Matron M Williams, into the mid-1930s, despite title to the hospital site being transferred in 1929 from Jack Humphrey to Walter Bartlett Chapman.

In 1934 the property was transferred to Frank Edward Payne, who converted it into a boarding house. The conversion may have reflected the impact of the Hospitals Act of 1923, which introduced a system of partly government-funded district hospitals, transforming public hospitals from charitable institutions for the poor to essential community services and a government responsibility. This system was enhanced under the Hospitals Act of 1936 and from 1 January 1946 access to public hospital treatment was made free for all Queenslanders. Between 1920 and 1940 the number of beds in Queensland's public hospitals rose from 3,700 to 7,606, increasing at a greater rate than population growth. In addition, the government- run hospitals tended to be better equipped than the small local private hospitals.

In the 1930s the rooms in The Rocks Private Hospital were converted into guestrooms and are still used as such. The previously spacious recovery rooms were divided by 8-foot (2.4 m) high timber partitions while in other areas internal walls were removed. The western side of the house was extended with four new bedrooms under a skillion roof. As a large, airy and ornate building with panoramic views of Cleveland Bay and Townsville, it quickly became popular with affluent holiday-makers and visiting professionals. Utilising the former name, Payne advertised the place under the name "The Rocks Guest House". By 1939 a male clientele was targeted, offering services such as free lunch and a taxi service.

The Rocks Guest House continued to advertise throughout World War II and while little information regarding the use of the building at this period survives, anecdotal evidence suggests that it may have been used as a convalescent home for returning servicemen. An above ground air-raid shelter was constructed at the rear of the house during the war.

In 1962 George and Sophie Gray purchased The Rocks Guest House. A world champion billiardist, George Gray had been a master cue-man during the 1920s. In 1936 Gray retired with his family to Townsville, running a billiard hall in Flinders Street. A large billiard table was the focal point of The Rocks during the 1960s, which continued to operate as a boarding house for young men. After this period the property deteriorated and functioned as budget lodging.

An August 1966 plan detailing proposed alterations to the boarding house indicated that by that date a separate wooden structure had been erected toward the rear of the allotment. It consisted of four rooms plus a verandah built against the drystone wall of Herbert Street. This building was largely destroyed by fire in June 1977 and what remained was demolished in August that year.

The Rocks Guesthouse changed hands in 1995 and extensive renovations were made. Partitions to the front rooms introduced as in the 1930s were removed and the large decorative arch, which announced the bay window, was reinstated as a key element to the main drawing room. Electrical re-wiring was undertaken and repairs were carried out to walls, floors and ceilings damaged by water and termite infestation. During the renovations one of the walls introduced in the 1909 additions was removed. Other elements were either revealed or rediscovered by the removal of introduced cladding, including original timber ceiling roses and stairs of brick rendered in stucco, left in situ under the extended front verandah.

The ornate fretwork under the gable was restored as well as the gable finial and painted property sign. A new verandah balustrade was installed and the curved brick wall at the front of the property was reconstructed.

In 1996 The Rocks was reopened as up-market Bed & Breakfast accommodation. During the course of renovations made in 1997, a concrete pit or bunker was discovered beneath the floorboards. It was concealed in one of the bedrooms, accessible by a small timber hatch in the bedroom floor. Its original use or date of construction is unknown.

In 2016, the Rocks is a private residence.

== Description ==
The Rocks Guesthouse is situated high on Melton Hill at 20 Cleveland Terrace, with panoramic views of the Coral Sea, Magnetic Island and Cleveland Bay. It is accessed from Cleveland Terrace. There is an unnamed laneway on the eastern side of the property and Herbert Street flanks the southern boundary. The place is an asymmetrical timber structure with readily discernable stages of metamorphous from private residence to hospital and later to guesthouse.

The Rocks Guesthouse consists of a combination of gabled and hipped roof structures, each timber framed and timber clad, with roofs of corrugated iron.

The original portion of the house (c. 1897) has a hipped roof with a projecting front gable and a half front verandah with a curved iron roof. A verandah has been added at an early date in front of the projecting gable and continuing around the eastern side of the house overlooking the adjacent laneway. A further skillion-roofed addition to the original front verandah extends over early brick and rendered stucco stairs, which remain in situ under the boards. The verandahs have a recent dowelling balustrade between timber columns, which have decorative timber brackets. The handrail is an angular shape. Flooring to the verandahs is of 4in wide hardwood.

Modern replica work includes the fretwork under the gable, the gable finial and the property name sign. The large front entrance door is early as are the door fittings.

The exterior walls of the original house are exposed stud frame lined internally with 8in deep chamfer boards. The piers for the original house are of brick (commons) similar to the ones used to construct the side wall. The piers (13?in x 13?in) are supporting bearers and in turn are supported by a layer of small rocks in a mud mixture. The brick piers extend partway to the middle of the house; beyond this, concrete piers are continued to the end of the operating theatre.

Internally the rooms of the original house have 13-foot-6-inch (4.11 m) high ceilings, picture rails, timber fretwork ceiling roses and timber partitioning in 5in wide tongue-and-groove boards. The main drawing room has a large bay window framed by an arch. The windows are large double-hung timber sashes with two panes per sash. While the side windows have long been removed and replaced by French windows and fanlights, evidence of their existence remains behind the door-jambs on the verandah, above the fan light and from the part removal of diagonal bracing. Original timber ceiling roses have been uncovered throughout the house and replicas have replaced those that were missing. Electric fans have been installed in some of the rooms and wired up through the ceiling roses. Above the internal doors are decorative timber fretwork panels. The pattern is very similar to the fretwork in Osler House and similar to fretwork attributed to Benjamin Toll that is found also in Charters Towers. Floors throughout are 6in wide hoop pine.

The principal additions associated with the conversion of the residence into a hospital in 1909, including a former operating theatre, staff quarters and kitchen, are largely confined to the rear of the residence. Of particular note is an attached hipped roof structure, which formerly contained an operating room and sterilizing room. The former operating room (now a guestroom) is still accessible from outside. This room has three lights in the roof, covered with corrugated iron. Fixed timber vents are located on the lower third of the room on two sides and closable timber vents are located on the upper level. There is an ornate ceiling rose of pressed metal.

The remainder of the rear rooms have been converted into guest rooms and some doors have been in-filled. Some of the smaller rooms have been converted into en-suites to service adjoining rooms. In the roof space above the hall in the rear section, is a large early water tank.

Four rooms constructed on the western side of the house in the 1930s have been converted into two rooms, en-suite and porch area. These rooms are under a skillion roof and the entrance porch is concealed behind timber lattice.

An above ground air-raid shelter constructed during World War II is located at the back of the house and is currently used as a guest room. It has a modern en-suite added to the room. There is a concrete pit or bunker under the western side of the house, accessible via a small timber hatch in the floor of one of the 1930s rooms. It measures 2.7 metres (8 ft 10 in) long by 1.2 metres (3 ft 11 in) wide and is 1.5 metres (4 ft 11 in) high. It has two large vent pipes inserted in the concrete ceiling, which emerge in the space between the top of the concrete structure and the floorboards of the house.

There is a timber and iron garage in the back yard, next to the former operating theatre, which is a later addition.

=== Gardens ===
The Rocks Guesthouse occupies most of the 811-square-metre (8,730 sq ft) allotment with two small landscaped garden areas at the front of the house and along the eastern side, dominated by a meandering brick pavement. At the rear of the house the garden is less defined and there is a paved car parking area. Two of the three flora identified in the 1997 Melton Hill Workshop Report as significant, remain. The frangipani (Plumeria) in particular, located on the eastern side of the house, has grown into a sizable and noteworthy tree as has the coconut palm (Cocos nucifera) that is located on the front western side to the building.

=== Stone and brick wall ===
The front of the property has a very impressive entrance stairway and rock wall, which was built in either the first or second stage of construction (c. 1897 or 1909). The return section of the stairs leading up to the house survives under the present verandah. The front stone wall joins onto the side brick wall which curves around the corner of the property and is situated over the boundary line on an unnamed laneway which runs between Herbert Street and Cleveland Terrace. The brick wall and the stone wall are noted in the 1926 and later surveys. The bright red bricks are laid in a variation of Flemish bond and indicate signs of early brick making techniques with characteristic folding of the pug, lack of consistency in sizing and imperfections. The rendered capping course is painted white.

== Heritage listing ==
The Rocks Guesthouse was listed on the Queensland Heritage Register on 10 April 2006 having satisfied the following criteria.

The place is important in demonstrating the evolution or pattern of Queensland's history.

The Rocks Guesthouse, constructed c. 1897-1900 as a private residence and converted in 1909 into a private hospital, is important in demonstrating part of the pattern of Queensland's history, in particular the construction of middle-class urban housing in areas with desirable amenity values; and the establishment of private hospitals in urban centres in the late 19th and early 20th centuries. A concrete air-raid shelter in the back yard remains as evidence of the impact of World War II on the civilian population of Townsville.

The place demonstrates rare, uncommon or endangered aspects of Queensland's cultural heritage.

The Rocks Guesthouse demonstrates rare surviving evidence of early 20th century private hospitals in Queensland, which are no longer common. The former operating room in particular is now rare in Queensland.

The place is important in demonstrating the principal characteristics of a particular class of cultural places.

The Rocks Guesthouse is important in demonstrating the principal characteristics of a late 19th-century middle-class North Queensland timber residence converted into a private hospital in the early 20th century: The core includes spacious, high-ceilinged rooms; a large bay window to the principal public room; and decorative elements such as fretwork ceiling vents. Its grounds retain an early brick and stone retaining wall and front garden stairs. At the rear of the original house the former operating room remains substantially intact and is important in demonstrating the principal characteristics of its type, including the need for adequate light and ventilation, demonstrated in the low fixed louvre vents, upper level movable louvres, overhead skylights and both internal and external entry.

The place is important because of its aesthetic significance.

The Rocks Guesthouse makes an important aesthetic contribution to the Melton Hill historical precinct. Situated in Cleveland Terrace between St James Cathedral and Synod Hall at one end and the remnants of JM Black's Drystone Wall on the other, it forms part of a notable group of elite residences, including Selhurst and Warringa.
