= Commercial Bank of Australia Building =

Commercial Bank of Australia Building may refer to:

- Commercial Bank of Australia Building, Armidale, New South Wales
- Commercial Bank of Australia Building, Townsville, Queensland

== See also ==
- Commercial Bank of Australia
- CBC Bank Building (disambiguation)
