= Westpac Bank Building, Townsville =

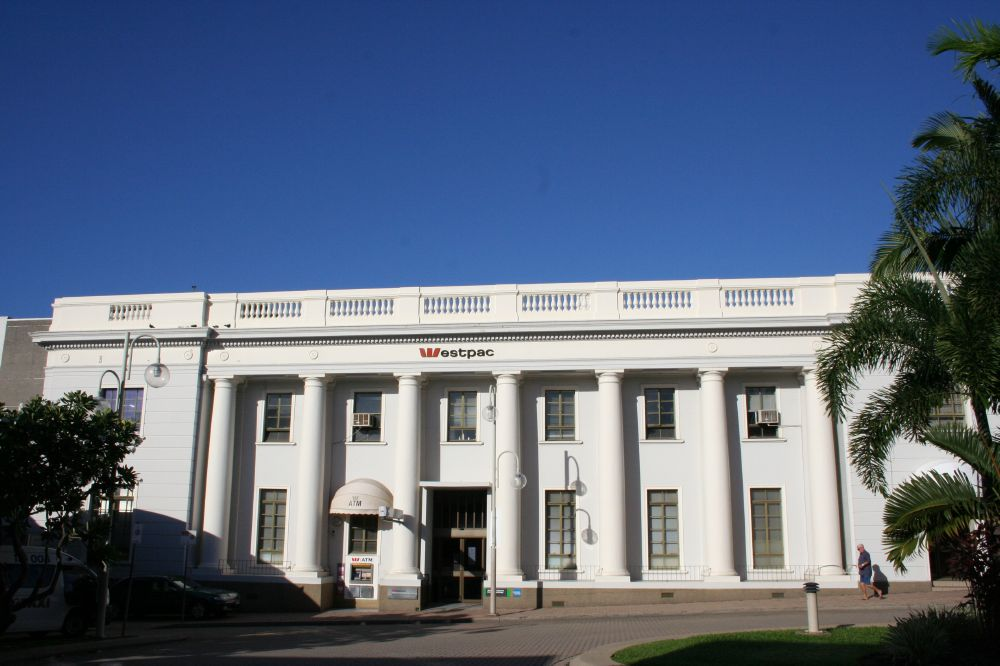
- Westpac Bank, corner of Flinders and Stokes Streets, Townsville, 2009

- Location within Queensland Location within Australia
- 19.2597°S 146.8165°E
- Location: 337–343 Flinders Street, Townsville CBD, City of Townsville, Queensland, Australia

History
- Design period: 1919–1930s (interwar period)
- Built: 1935

Site notes
- Architect: Hall and Cook
- Architectural style: Classicism

Queensland Heritage Register
- Official name: Westpac Bank
- Type: state heritage (built)
- Designated: 13 May 2004
- Reference no.: 602157
- Significant period: 1930s (fabric); 1935–ongoing (historical use as bank)
- Significant components: shop/s, banking chamber, residential accommodation – manager's house/quarters
- Builders: Stuart Brothers (Sydney)

Westpac Bank Building is a heritage-listed bank building at 337–343 Flinders Street, Townsville CBD, City of Townsville, Queensland, Australia. It was designed by Hall and Cook and built in 1935 by Stuart Brothers (Sydney). It was added to the Queensland Heritage Register on 13 May 2004.

== History ==
An imposing two-storeyed masonry building, the Westpac Bank was erected in 1935 as the Bank of New South Wales. This building was the third premises built by the bank in Townsville.

The Bank of New South Wales, founded in 1817, was intimately associated with the early development of Townsville. Robert Towns, the co-founder of Townsville, was a director of the Bank of New South Wales. Not surprisingly, he was instrumental in encouraging the bank to establish a branch at Cleveland Bay. After some delays, the Bank of New South Wales opened a branch in rented premises on 20 March 1866. The Bank of NSW was the second in the settlement, after the Australian Joint Stock Bank which had opened a month earlier.

The Bank purchased an allotment on the corner of the Strand and Wickham Street in 1867 and premises and a manager's residence were erected two years later. Anticipating the future growth of Townsville in Flinders Street East, the Bank purchased two allotments on the corner of Flinders and Wickham Streets in 1875. Two-storeyed premises were erected in 1887.

As the centre of the business district shifted westwards along Flinders Street, the bank again decided to relocate its Townsville branch. In 1915, the Bank of NSW purchased an allotment on the corner of Flinders and Stokes Streets. As with the previous relocation, the bank did not erect new premises immediately. The shops on the allotment were rented and some sold in 1922. More than fifteen years after the initial purchase of the land, Brisbane architect, Francis Richard Hall, senior partner of Hall and Cook, was commissioned to prepare plans for a new building containing offices and shops as well as facilities for the bank.

The building costing £32,345 was constructed by Stuart Brothers of Sydney and completed in 1935. It was occupied by the Bank of NSW which had amalgamated in 1931 with the Australian Bank of Commerce, formerly the Australian Joint Stock Bank. The building was considered one of Townsville's most "imposing edifices" at the time of construction. It was designed to ameliorate the hot climate through the use of cross ventilation and cavity construction. Elaborate bronze entrance doors were a feature of the elevations and cost over £1,000. The banking chamber had paneled wainscots and counters in north Queensland maple.

Renovations were carried out in 1961, 1966, 1968 and 1971. The exterior has been subject to minor alterations while the interior on the ground floor has been refurbished.

== Description ==
Located on the corner of Flinders Street Mall and Stokes Street, in the centre of Townsville, the Westpac Bank is a two storeyed masonry building with a smaller attic storey. Built up to the property alignment on the street sides, the building is roughly L-shaped in plan with a single storey service zone occupying the rear of the site. The south east frontage to Flinders Street is 62 feet (19 m) long and the north east frontage to Stokes Street is 135 feet (41 m). Constructed of reinforced concrete with an outer brick veneer, the walls are generally finished with cement render, now painted.

The street facades are designed in an imposing classical style. Giant Tuscan order colonnades are terminated in solid corners with banded rustication. The columns sit on a raised base, about a metre above the Flinders Street level, and carry a simple entablature surmounted by a more ornamental parapet with a central cartouche and panels of classical balusters. The name of the bank, flanked by circular motifs, is written in the frieze. The base of the building, which has been refinished with a pebble aggregate, diminishes on the Stokes Street side due to a gentle rise towards the north. The northernmost part of the Stokes Street elevation, originally two shops, is face brickwork with a rendered entablature matching the main part of the building. An awning projects over the footpath in front of the brick section. Most of the windows are generously proportioned steel framed casements with simple classical architraves.

The banking chamber, which occupies the corner position on the ground floor, has entrances from both Flinders Street and Stokes Street. The Flinders Street entrance is raised about five steps above the footpath level. The entrance doors are located centrally in the walls behind the colonnades. These walls are decorated with pilasters, positioned directly behind the columns. Simple ironwork panels and gates are positioned between the bases of the columns. Automatic aluminium doors have replaced the original bronze doors. The banking chamber, although much altered, is in the original location and retains some original structural walls and columns. The remainder of the ground floor is occupied by the bank and used for offices, storage and staff facilities. Due to the slope in Stokes Street the northern end of the ground floor has been built at a higher level. An additional ground floor entrance on Stokes Street opens directly into the higher level.

Entrances to the upper floors are located on both Flinders and Stokes Streets. The Flinders street entrance, located in the banded section of wall on the southern end of the colonnade, leads to an entry vestibule and dogleg staircase. The stair, which extends to the third level, has terrazzo treads and risers, a timber handrail and a decorative iron balustrade.

The Stokes Street entrance to the second level is less prominent, being positioned in a gap between the rendered and the brick sections of the building. The stair at this entrance is a single straight flight terminating in a landing located closer to the upper level. At the landing, the stair splits into two flights, which run at 90 degrees to the main flight of stairs. The second level consists of a central corridor with offices along the street side of the building and services on the opposite side. Although somewhat altered the second level retains many original details including signage, stair handrails, timber paneled doors, timber and glass partitioning and terrazzo dividers in the toilet cubicles.

The third storey, originally a residence, is a tenanted office and training rooms for the bank. It is positioned close to the Flinders Street facade occupying about a third of the area of the floor below. The remainder consists of a large flat roof deck surrounded by the building parapet. The third storey is located behind the parapet and is not very visible from the street. A water tank sits above the roof of the third storey.

== Heritage listing ==
Westpac Bank was listed on the Queensland Heritage Register on 13 May 2004 having satisfied the following criteria.

The place is important in demonstrating the evolution or pattern of Queensland's history.

The Westpac Bank, the third location of the Bank of New South Wales in Townsville and one of the largest banking buildings in north Queensland at the time of its construction, demonstrates the evolution of commerce in north Queensland and its contribution to the development of Townsville as a regional centre.

The place is important in demonstrating the principal characteristics of a particular class of cultural places.

In the choice of a classical style of architecture, central location and arrangement of spaces - a spacious banking chamber combined with shops, tenantable offices and residential accommodation on the roof level - the Westpac Bank is important in illustrating the principal characteristics of an interwar bank in a regional centre.

The place is important because of its aesthetic significance.

A fine example of the commercial architecture of Francis Richard Hall, the Westpac Bank, with its well-ordered and classically proportioned facades, contributes to the Flinders Street streetscape.

The place has a special association with the life or work of a particular person, group or organisation of importance in Queensland's history.

The place has a strong association with the work of the Bank of New South Wales in fostering the development of Townsville in the 19th and early 20th centuries as North Queensland's principal regional commercial centre.
