= George Gray (billiards player) =

Australian player of English billiards (1892–?)

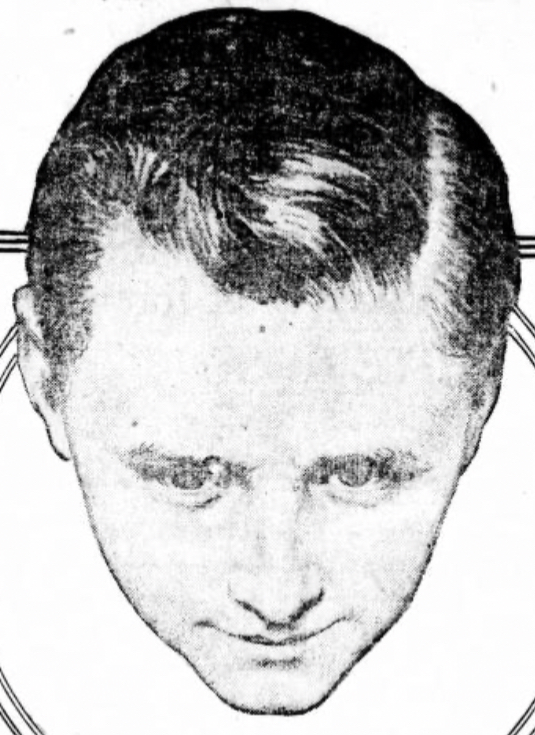
- Gray in a 1911 publication
- Born: 1892; Albert Park, Victoria, Australia
- Occupation: English billiards player
- Years active: c. 1905 – 1936

George Gray (1892 – ?) was an Australian player of English billiards.

== Biography ==
Gray was born in 1892, in Albert Park, Victoria. He first played billiards c. 1905, with Henry Upton Alcock. He first toured England in 1910 and 1911, at age 19. He practised eight hours per day in Leeds with George Nelson. During his practises, he averaged 83 breaks, scoring 345 breaks during one. During the tour, he played 23 games in which he scored over 1000 breaks, including one at 2196. In 1911, he set a world record during a game in Southampton, achieving a run of 1,576, am improvement from the previous record of 1,240, set by Roberts. He received a gold medal from the British Billiard Association presented for the achievement.

Gray was praised for his skill at his age. He often played spot stroke, which was often criticised by his viewers for being boring. He contracted with Roberts, who in 1912, sued him for breach of contract and sought £1,000 from him. On January 19, 1912, he defeated world champion H. W. Stevenson in a best two out of three game, after which he was considered one of the best billiards players in the world at the time.

He was reputedly the only player of English billiards of his time to have scored over 1,000 points with ivory billiard balls. He did so multiple times, including a score of 1,134 in a May 1915 game against Claude Falkiner. Gray attended the 1915 Pocket Billiards Championship at the New York Athletic Club, which he won.

In 1936, Gray retired and moved to City of Townsville, where he operated a billiard hall on Flinders Street. In 1962, he and his wife, Sophie, bought The Rocks Guesthouse. While living there, he ran it as a boarding house.

Gray's playing was studied by Willie Smith.
