= Commonwealth Offices, Townsville =

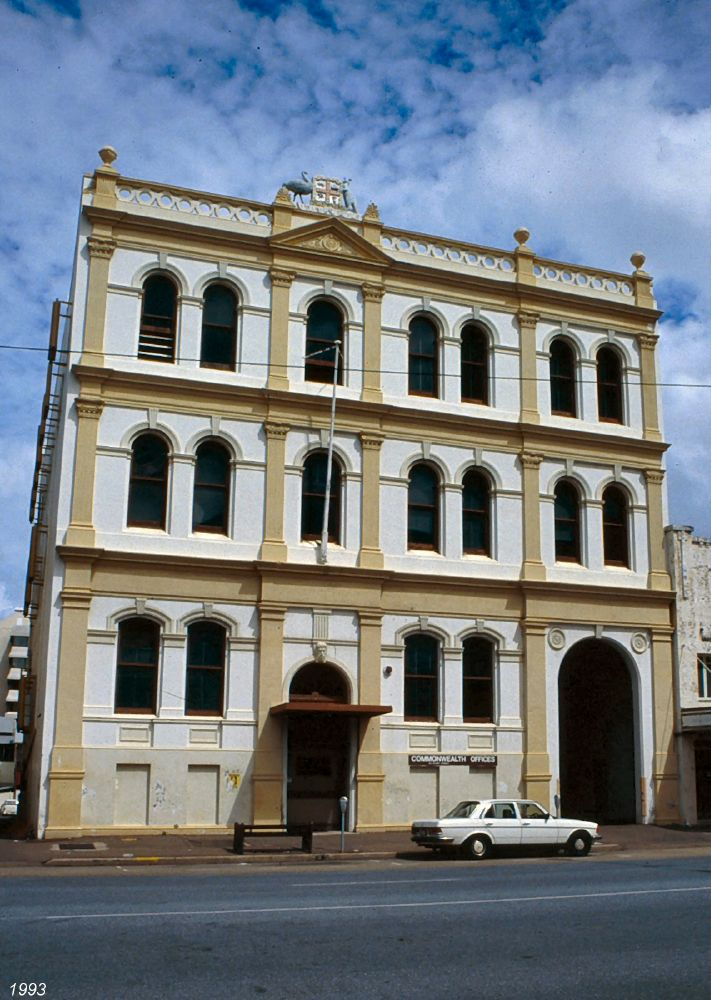
- Commonwealth Offices, 1993

- Location within Queensland Location within Australia
- 19.2583°S 146.817°E
- Location: 42 Sturt Street, Townsville CBD, City of Townsville, Queensland, Australia

History
- Design period: 1870s–1890s (late 19th century)
- Built: 1884–1889

Site notes
- Architectural style: Classicism

Queensland Heritage Register
- Official name: Commonwealth Offices, D & W Murray Ltd Building, Rooneys Ltd Building, Scott, Dawson & Stewart Building
- Type: state heritage (built)
- Designated: 15 June 1994
- Reference no.: 600932
- Significant period: 1880s (fabric); 1884–1938 (historical commercial use); 1941–1987 (Defence and Government use)
- Significant components: carriage way/drive, basement / sub-floor, gate – entrance

Commonwealth Offices is a heritage-listed commercial building at 42 Sturt Street, Townsville CBD, City of Townsville, Queensland, Australia. It was built from 1884 to 1889. It has also known as D & W Murray Ltd Building, Rooneys Ltd Building and Scott, Dawson & Stewart Building. As at March 2016, it is known as Federation Place. It was added to the Queensland Heritage Register on 15 June 1994.

== History ==
This three-storeyed masonry building with subfloor was erected in two stages, 1884 and c. 1889, as warehouse and offices for the established British drapery firm of Scott, Dawson & Stewart, who were the first to conduct a large wholesale drapery business in Townsville.

Scott, Dawson & Stewart had offices in London, Glasgow and Brisbane before establishing the Townsville branch in 1884, when the subfloor and first level of the present building were erected. At the time, it was the most substantial wholesale drapery warehouse in Townsville. The firm's closest rival, Hollis Hopkins & Co Ltd, had established a wholesale drapery business in Townsville in 1881, but their substantial brick premises, also in Sturt Street and almost opposite those of Scott, Dawson & Stewart, were not erected until 1886–87. These have since been demolished.

The establishment in Townsville of wholesale drapery firms, from which local drapers were able to buy goods in wholesale quantities at wholesale prices, revolutionised the drapery business in that town, with price reductions being passed on to consumers. Scott, Dawson & Stewart also received regular shipments direct from London, avoiding additional freight costs from Brisbane.

In 1887, the subfloor of their building consisted of display and storage space on two levels, with a large packing room at the rear of the lower flat, and a bulk store housing surplus stock. The first level contained the manager's office and a counting house, and white cedars had been planted as shade trees at the front of the building.

In August 1889, Townsville architects WG Smith & Sons called tenders for additions to the premises, and it appears that this was when the further two storeys and the dray entrance were added. The approximation of the Townsville city seal, above the pediment, appears in a photograph dated 1897. According to council records, the design was drawn between 1897 and 1899 for the Townsville Municipal Council, despite Townsville not being proclaimed a city until 1902.

D&W Murray Ltd, a wholesale importing firm based in London, leased the premises from 1899, and purchased them in 1913. In 1928, Townsville builders, timber merchants and furniture manufacturers, Rooneys Ltd, occupied the building as a store and furniture showroom, purchasing the property in 1933. Rooneys Ltd, whose business was being wound down, moved out of the building c.1938, and it remained vacant until acquired in mid-1941 by the Australian Government for defence purposes, serving as Australian Defence Headquarters, North Eastern Area, during the Second World War.

After the war the building remained Commonwealth Offices, housing the RAAF's Recruiting Offices and Air Training Corps Headquarters. More recently, it was occupied by the Department of Social Security, until sold by the Commonwealth in 1987.

As of March 2016, the building, now called Federation Place, is occupied by a number of tenants; a number of them provide legal services.

== Description ==
The Commonwealth Offices, a three-storeyed building with subfloor, is a rendered masonry structure with a triple corrugated iron hipped roof concealed behind a parapet wall. The building, located on the south side of Sturt Street, shows classical influences in its facade which consists of four bays separated by pilasters supporting a deep cornice between each floor, with a rendered parapet with open circle motifs. Each bay has two arched sash windows, except the second bay which is narrower and forms the entrance, with single arched sash windows above and is surmounted by a pediment with a plaster sculpture of the Townsville City seal. The entrance has an arched door, with a cantilevered metal awning, located midway between the ground floor and subfloor. The western bay has a large arch with iron gates which accesses a driveway to the rear of the building.

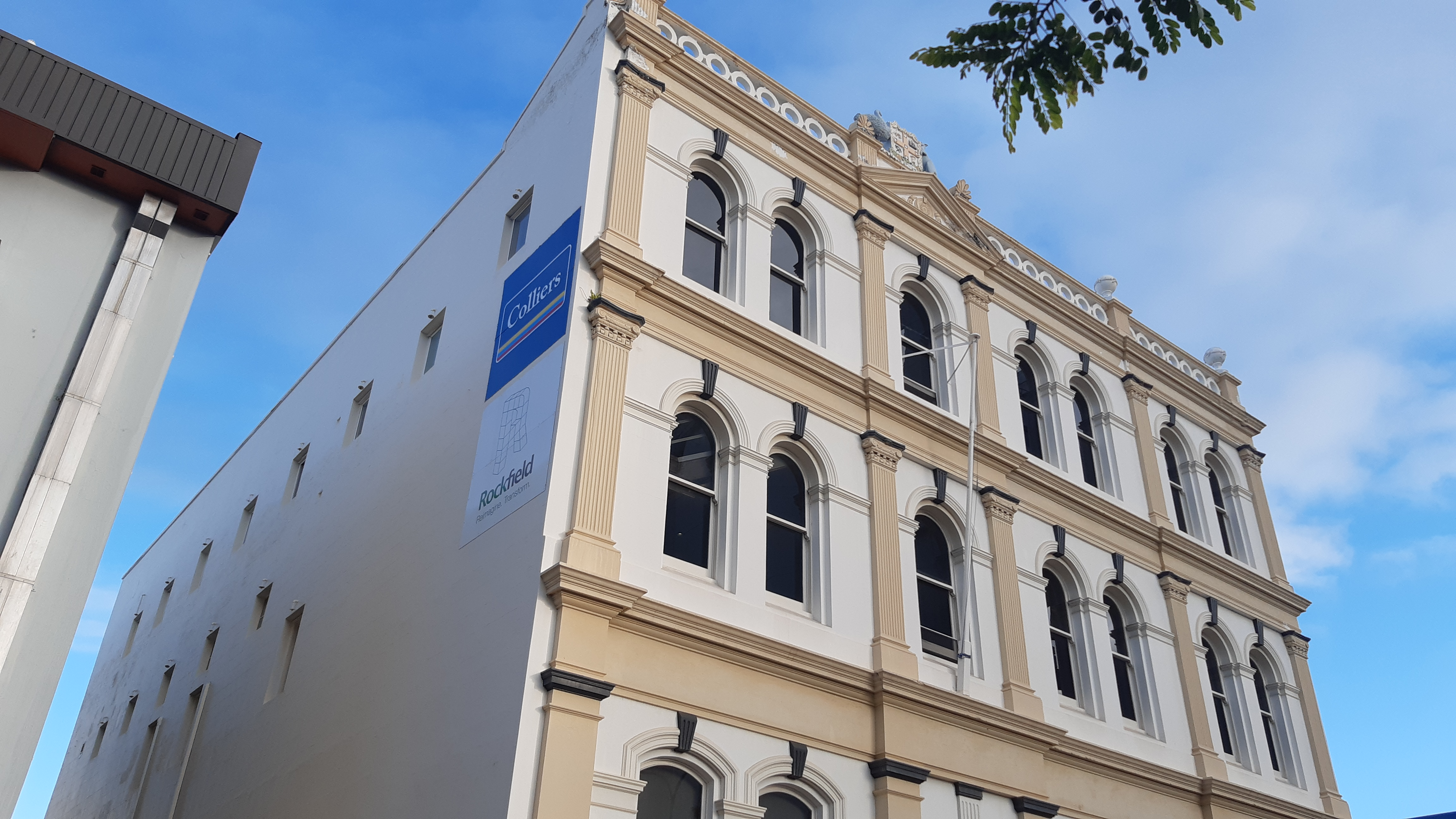
Side view of the building in 2025

The side and rear elevations have been altered, with some windows enclosed, window openings added at the southern corner, metal louvre sun-shading attached and a rear steel fire stair.

Internally, the building has been refitted several times. The split level foyer has a hydraulic lift with a staircase either side, a sloping ceiling, timber veneer wall panelling and vinyl tiles. A staircase is located in the northern corner and false ceilings with air conditioning have been installed. Each floor has cast iron columns, some concealed by partition walls creating offices and corridors.

== Heritage listing ==
Commonwealth Offices was listed on the Queensland Heritage Register on 15 June 1994 having satisfied the following criteria.

The place is important in demonstrating the evolution or pattern of Queensland's history.

It is important in demonstrating the evolution and pattern of Queensland's history, illustrating the growth of mercantilism in Townsville in the 1880s, and of the town's development as the principal commercial centre of North Queensland in the late 19th century. The Commonwealth Offices also illustrated the role played by Townsville in the defence of Australia during the Second World War.

The place demonstrates rare, uncommon or endangered aspects of Queensland's cultural heritage.

The Commonwealth Offices demonstrate a rare aspect of Queensland's cultural heritage, being one of the few substantial, masonry warehouses erected in Townsville in the late 19th century.

The place is important in demonstrating the principal characteristics of a particular class of cultural places.

The Commonwealth Offices are important in demonstrating the principal characteristics of a large and substantially intact, masonry warehouse of the 1880s, in Townsville.

The place is important because of its aesthetic significance.

The Commonwealth Offices are important in exhibiting a range of aesthetic characteristics valued by the Townsville community, in particular their scale, form and materials, their composition of classical elements and their contribution to the Sturt Street streetscape and Townsville townscape.
