= Clayton's Apothecaries' Hall =

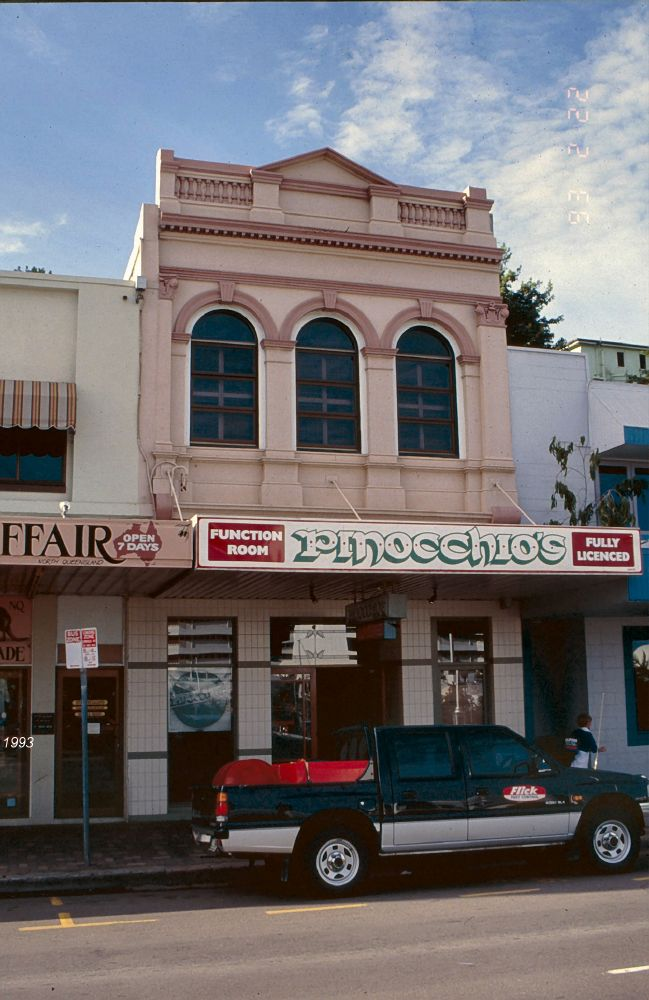
- Former Clayton's Apothecaries' Hall, 1993

- Location within Queensland Location within Australia
- 19.2576°S 146.819°E
- Location: 221–223 Flinders Street, Townsville CBD, City of Townsville, Queensland, Australia

History
- Design period: 1870s–1890s (late 19th century)
- Built: 1885

Queensland Heritage Register
- Official name: 223 Flinders Street, Townsville, Bamboo Inn, Clayton's Apothecaries' Hall, Pinocchio's Restaurant
- Type: state heritage (built)
- Designated: 21 October 1992
- Reference no.: 600902
- Significant period: 1880s (fabric); 1885–1909 (historical use by Chemist)

Clayton's Apothecaries' Hall is a heritage-listed pharmacy at 221–223 Flinders Street, Townsville CBD, City of Townsville, Queensland, Australia. It was built in 1885. It is also known as Bamboo Inn and Pinocchio's Restaurant. It was added to the Queensland Heritage Register on 21 October 1992.

== History ==
This two-storeyed masonry building was erected in 1885 for Townsville chemist William Clayton, who acquired the site early in 1885.

Clayton, an English pharmaceutical chemist, arrived in Townsville in the early 1870s, and purchased John E Rutherford's chemist business, the Apothecaries' Hall, established in Townsville in 1866 by AH Cooper. In less than 15 years he developed the business into a prominent enterprise, as evidenced in the 1880s construction of his new building. William Clayton was an active community member: alderman on the Townsville Municipal Council for many years; Mayor of Townsville in 1890; member of the Thuringowa Divisional Board; member of the Hospital and School of Arts Committees; Master Freemason; and magistrate.

Clayton sold the Flinders Street East building in 1890, but then leased it until about 1909. The business then was then moved further west in the street to premises adjacent to Brodziak & Rodgers, in what by the early 1900s had become a more central location. William Clayton died in 1920, but his business was carried on by his son, Victor Osborne Clayton.

Since 1909, the Flinders Street East building has housed general offices, small business, shops and at least two restaurants.

As at March 2016, the building is occupied by a pie shop.

== Description ==
Clayton's Apothecaries' Hall is a two-storeyed rendered masonry building, with a corrugated iron gable roof concealed behind a parapet wall, located on the northern side of Flinders Street at the base of Melton Hill.

The ground floor facade has a recessed central entry with anodised aluminium framed windows on each side and glazing and glazed tiles to the walls. A metal awning is supported by the first floor facade, which consists of three arched windows with aluminium framed hoppers, framed by pilasters and cornice, surmounted by a central pediment with rendered balustrade.

The first floor is at ground level at the rear, with a concreted courtyard, containing air conditioning equipment, and separating it from a single-storeyed residence fronting Melton Terrace.

Internally, the restaurant has original stairs on the eastern side linking the ground and first floor, false ceilings, partition walls and recent fixtures and finishes.

There are dining rooms to both floors, and a kitchen is located on the ground floor at the rear with a concrete stair, built against excavated rock face, accessing the rear courtyard above. A third staircase has been inserted in the centre of the building to conform to fire regulations.

== Heritage listing ==
Clayton's Apothecaries' Hall was listed on the Queensland Heritage Register on 21 October 1992 having satisfied the following criteria.

The place is important in demonstrating the evolution or pattern of Queensland's history.

The building, erected in 1885, is important in exhibiting a range of aesthetic characteristics valued by the Townsville community, in particular its contribution in scale, form and materials to the streetscape of Flinders Street and to the Townsville townscape. It has a special association with early and prominent Townsville resident William Clayton, and his contribution to the development of Townsville in the late 19th century.

The place is important because of its aesthetic significance.

The building is important in exhibiting a range of aesthetic characteristics valued by the Townsville community, in particular its contribution in scale, form and materials to the streetscape of Flinders Street and to the Townsville townscape.

The place has a special association with the life or work of a particular person, group or organisation of importance in Queensland's history.

It has a special association with early and prominent Townsville resident William Clayton, and his contribution to the development of Townsville in the late 19th century.
