= Howard Smith Company Building, Townsville =

Howard Smith Company Building
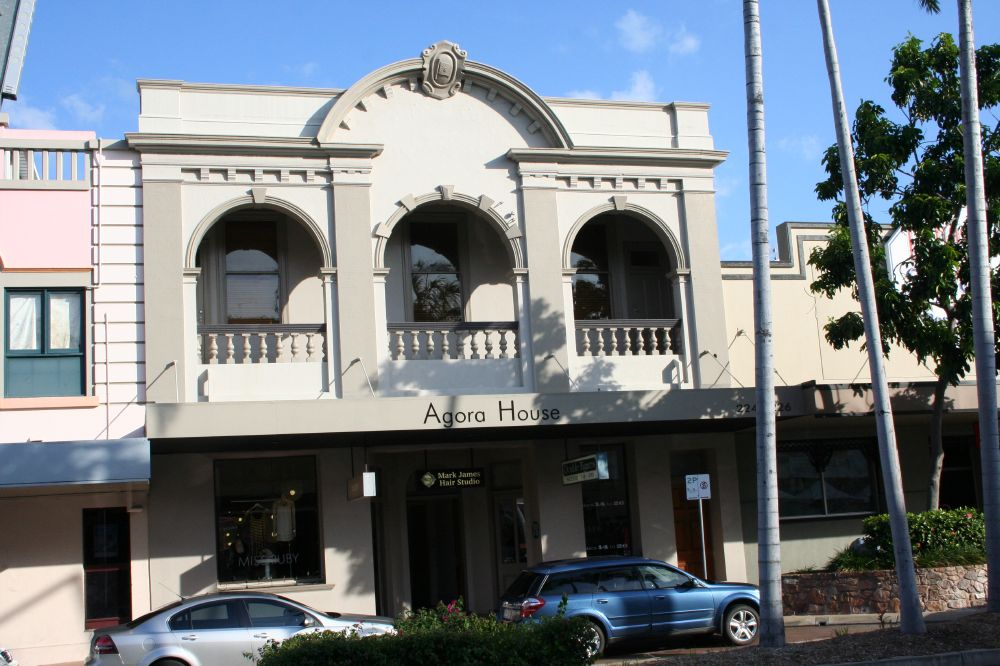
- Howard Smith Company Building (now Agora House), 2009

- Location within Queensland Location within Australia
- 19.2582°S 146.8188°E
- Location: 224 Flinders Street, Townsville CBD, City of Townsville, Queensland, Australia

History
- Design period: 1900–1914 (early 20th century)
- Built: 1910–1911

Site notes
- Architect(s): Charles Dalton Lynch and Walter Hunt
- Architectural style: Classicism

Queensland Heritage Register
- Official name: Agora House, Howard Smith Company Building, Patterson, Reid & Bruce Ltd Building
- Type: state heritage (built)
- Designated: 21 October 1992
- Reference no.: 600913
- Significant period: 1910s, 1920s (fabric); 1911–1969 (historical, ownership)
- Significant components: loggia/s, strong room
- Builders: Hanson & Sons

Howard Smith Company Building is a heritage-listed office building at 224 Flinders Street, Townsville CBD, City of Townsville, Queensland, Australia. It was designed by Charles Dalton Lynch and Walter Hunt and built from 1910 to 1911 by Hanson & Sons. It is also known as Patterson, and Reid & Bruce Ltd Building and Agora House. It was added to the Queensland Heritage Register on 21 October 1992.

== History ==
This two-storeyed commercial building was erected in 1910–11 as new offices for the Townsville branch of the Howard Smith Company Ltd, a substantial Australian coastal shipping company.

The firm was established in Melbourne in the early 1850s by Captain William Howard Smith. Its operations were extended to Central Queensland in 1870, and to Townsville in 1882, in the form of an agency. The firm, by then known as Howard Smith & Sons Ltd, made an important economic contribution to the development of North Queensland through its trading ventures and shipping network.

By the 1890s a Townsville branch had been established at Queen's Wharf. About 1900 the firm leased a single-storeyed brick building in Flinders Street, erected for them by shipping and commercial agents Aplin, Brown & Crawshay, who occupied the adjacent building at the corner of Flinders and Denham Streets. Shortly after this, in 1901, the business was reconstructed as the Howard Smith Company Ltd. In 1909 Harry Bellingham Howard Smith (managing director of the company and son of the founder of the firm) purchased two allotments on the other side of the leased premises in Flinders Street. On these, Howard Smith Company's own building was erected in 1910–11, and occupied in March 1911.

The new building was designed by Townsville architects Charles Dalton Lynch and Walter Hunt, and was erected by contractors Hanson & Sons. It was considered to be of progressive construction at the time. The front section of the building was two-storeyed, and contained offices for lease. The rear was single-storeyed, and contained a single large chamber which accommodated the company's own offices. Part of this space was enclosed by a counter, which was flanked by offices of the manager, accountant, correspondence clerks and engineer. These were divided by low partitions in silky oak and oriental glass. Above was a flat roof of reinforced concrete and a large skylight, with windows operated by continuous rod-gearing. The architects invented their own formula for waterproofing the concrete roof. A second storey, with a clerestory, had been added to this rear section in 1920.

Howard Smith sold the building in 1969 to Paterson Reid & Bruce Ltd. In 1979 the building was sold again and its ground floor interior was altered to accommodate three shops, and it is understood the name was changed to Agora House at this time. In 1991 the first floor was converted to residential accommodation.

As at March 2016, the ground floor is occupied by a number of shops, while the upper floor is a 3-bedroom apartment.

== Description ==
The Howard Smith Company Building is a two-storeyed concrete building fronting Flinders Street to the northwest, with Denham Lane to the rear.

The ground floor has a central recessed entry, with double doors and fanlights into a shop either side and a central foyer. Each shop has a large display window, and a recessed entrance door, leading to a staircase to the first floor, is situated on the western side. A metal awning is slung from the first floor, which has a recessed loggia and a parapet concealing the roof form, which is possibly shallow, hipped corrugated iron with ridge ventilation.

The first floor loggia consists of three arched bays with rendered balustrade, separated by pilasters supporting deep cornices on either side of a raised central rounded pediment surmounted by a shield. Sash windows open onto the loggia, with a door at the eastern end.

The rear of the building has metal framed hopper windows with a two-storeyed, skillion roofed amenities addition on the western side, and a single-storeyed carport/loading area with roller doors beside.

Internally, the central foyer splays open off a short hall and has a shop at the rear. The foyer space has a row of original cast iron columns along the eastern side and a recessed lighting grid to the ceiling. The eastern shop has a section of pressed metal ceiling at the front, and enclosed window openings can be seen along the eastern wall. The rear shop has a strongroom and a large sliding door to the rear carport/loading area.

The first floor possibly has rooms at the front, a large open space behind with a kitchenette and bathroom along the rear wall, and sections of raised timber floor.

== Heritage listing ==
The Howard Smith Company Building was listed on the Queensland Heritage Register on 21 October 1992 having satisfied the following criteria.

The place is important in demonstrating the evolution or pattern of Queensland's history.

Erected in 1910–11, the building is important in demonstrating the pattern of Queensland's history, being surviving evidence in Townsville of the important Queensland economic recovery of the early 20th century; an early use of concrete construction in a Townsville commercial building; and evidence of the continued development of Townsville as the principal port of North Queensland in the early 20th century.

The place is important in demonstrating the principal characteristics of a particular class of cultural places.

It is important in demonstrating the principal characteristics of an early 20th century, two-storeyed commercial building in Townsville.

The place is important because of its aesthetic significance.

It is important in exhibiting a range of aesthetic characteristics valued by the Townsville community, in particular the contribution of the building, through its composition of classical elements, to the streetscape of Flinders Street and to the Townsville townscape; and the quality of design of the building and surviving original interior elements.

The place has a special association with the life or work of a particular person, group or organisation of importance in Queensland's history.

It has a special association with the important Australian coastal shipping firm Howard Smith Company Ltd, and its contribution to the economic development of Townsville and North Queensland.
