= Synod Hall, Townsville =

Synod Hall
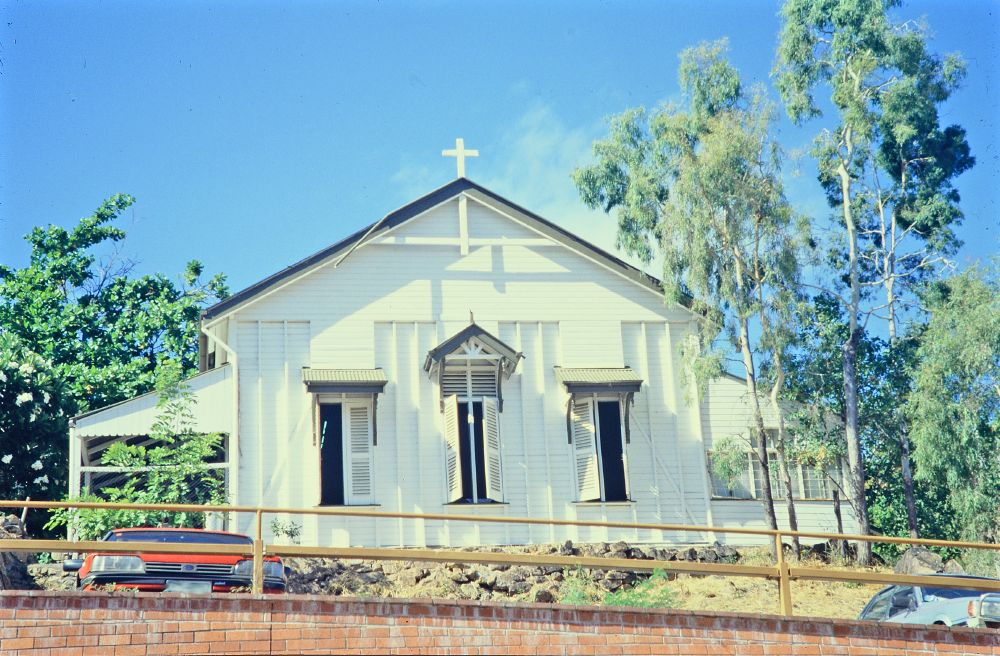
- Synod Hall, 1996

- Location within Queensland Location within Australia
- 19.256°S 146.8175°E
- Location: 36 Cleveland Terrace, Townsville CBD, City of Townsville, Queensland, Australia

History
- Design period: 1870s–1890s (late 19th century)
- Built: 1897–1898

Queensland Heritage Register
- Official name: Synod Hall, Jubilee Hall, Parish Room
- Type: state heritage (built)
- Designated: 21 October 1992
- Reference no.: 600888
- Significant period: 1890s (historical); 1890s–1980s (social)
- Significant components: church hall/sunday school hall, views to

Synod Hall is a heritage-listed Anglican church hall at 36 Cleveland Terrace, Townsville CBD, City of Townsville, Queensland, Australia. It was built from 1897 to 1898. It is also known as Jubilee Hall and Parish Room. It was added to the Queensland Heritage Register on 21 October 1992.

== History ==
Synod Hall was opened during the first week of January 1898.

Townsville was founded in November 1864. Although it is not known when the first Church of England services were held in the township it is known that the first services were conducted in the Court House, which was built by March 1866. These services were conducted by local lay preachers or itinerant ministers. In February 1866 Rev Mr Searle, visiting minister from Bowen, requested the appointment of an incumbent to the parish of Townsville with Rev James Adams accepting the position by mid 1866.

On 24 December 1872 land for a church was purchased on Melton Hill by trustees James Gordon, Frederick Walker and William Aplin. In February, 1884 control of the land passed to the Corporation of the Diocesan Synod of North Queensland.

On 18 November 1887 tenders were called for the construction of a "Parish Room", to be built to a design prepared by Townsville architectural firm Eyre and Munro. The building does not appear to have been constructed at that time because the Mayor and Alderman of the Townsville Town Council received a letter, dated Thursday 30 December 1897, from St James Parochial Council inviting them to the official opening of the Jubilee Hall on the following Wednesday 5 January 1898.

The new hall, constructed in 1897, the Diamond Jubilee Year of Queen Victoria, was given the name Jubilee Hall. 1887, the year tenders were first called for a "Parish Room", was the Golden Jubilee of Queen Victoria.

The 1897 hall may have been constructed to a design by Townsville architect Walter Morris Eyre, a member of the Cathedral Committee and supervising architect for the Sydney firm of Blacket and Sons, designers of St James Cathedral. Eyre took over the supervision of the construction of the cathedral after the diocese dispensed with the services of Arthur Blacket on 5 March 1890. By 1897, Eyre who was no longer in partnership with Munro, was practicing as an architect, civil engineer and building inspector. He was also still on the Cathedral Committee and it seems probable that he designed the Jubilee Hall.

After it was constructed the hall became a focus for parish and diocesan activities including the gathering of the Ninth Synod of the Anglican Diocese of North Queensland who met in 1898 soon after the building was opened. The name was later changed to Synod Hall, probably because the Synod of the Anglican Diocese of North Queensland continued to hold their meetings in the building.

In 1899 Miss Florence Buchanan of Thursday Island, was invited by Bishop Christopher Barlow to work among Chinese and Japanese children in Townsville. A Japanese school was opened in Synod Hall by Miss Buchanan and a school for Chinese children was opened in the Mission Hall, constructed below Synod Hall. The Japanese school continued at least until 1902 when Miss Buchanan returned to Thursday Island. The mission hall was destroyed in Cyclone Leonta in 1902 and does not appear to have been rebuilt.

At one time the Anglican High School for Girls (later St Ann's School) held classes in the hall and in 1903, while repairs were being carried out after St James Cathedral was damaged during Cyclone Leonta, Synod Hall was used for church services.

Several early photographs show the Synod Hall from the early 1900s. The land between the hall and the cathedral was level, with access to the hall via a driveway rising up between the buildings. The north-western verandah has changed little, but there was a handrail between the posts with blinds behind. The south-eastern verandah was similar to the other, being open at the front with some infill panels of boarding between posts towards the rear. This confirms that the present Green Room was a later addition, perhaps between the wars. At the front is a decorative fretwork panel above the gable tie. On the flat land between the two buildings, photographs from the inter-war period show a structure which appears to be a tennis court.

The hall, used as a parish centre for one hundred years, lost this central role after a new parish building was constructed on a nearby site in the 1980s. In keeping with its past role as a social and administrative centre, the building was leased to the Townsville Little Theatre in October 1994 and was used as a rehearsal studio, performance venue and headquarters for the theatre company. In December 1998, the Townsville Little Theatre moved to other premises.

== Description ==
Synod Hall is nestled into the south-western side of Melton Hill, which separates Townsville's central business district from Cleveland Bay, and is part of the foothills to the east of Castle Hill. The hall is sited to the east of St James Cathedral on a small terrace, with thicket behind and the stony hillside falling away from the front of the building. The principle facade overlooks the city centre to the south, and is prominent from Denham Street, a major thoroughfare.

The hall is a rectangular timber building on a near north–south axis, with verandahs along both sides. The gabled roof is painted corrugated iron, with a gabled ridge vent running most of its length, and a lean-to roof to each verandah. At each end of the ridge is a finial-like timber cross.

The building is set close to ground level on a concrete slab, with the timber framing mounted on hobs. The walls are lined with chamferboards and the timber framing exposed externally. Above the windows and within the gables the walls are sheeted with chamferboards externally also.

The southern facade facing the city has three tall narrow openings, symmetrically arranged. The outer two are a pair of timber louvre shutters, with corrugated iron hoods over. The central opening has similar shutters and a fixed panel of louvres above, plus a more ornate gabled hood.

The building is approached from the elevated carpark to the west. The western verandah is open, apart from a small store to the rear also of exposed framing. The verandah is framed in stop-chamfered posts and rafters. Opening onto the verandah are two substantial sliding doors clad in beaded boards, with panels of open timber battening above. Other doors are also boarded.

The eastern verandah is enclosed as a kitchen, clad with external chamferboards and glass louvres, and lined with fibrous cement sheet. Towards the rear, the Green Room projects past the line of the verandah, and is clad in chamferboards with panels of fixed timber louvres.

The internal walls of the hall are the beaded face of the horizontal cladding boards. There is a timber floor to the hall, and a timber stage to the northern end.

The ceiling is divided into six bays by curved and moulded timber brackets, joined by tie rods across the room. A pressed metal ceiling rose is centred within each bay. The ceiling also is lined with beaded boards, running diagonally where the ceiling rakes up to the collar tie.

Behind the stage are two windows of adjustable timber louvres, trimmed with moulded architraves and with triangular pediments over.

== Heritage listing ==
Synod Hall was listed on the Queensland Heritage Register on 21 October 1992 having satisfied the following criteria.

The place is important in demonstrating the evolution or pattern of Queensland's history.

Synod Hall demonstrates the early development of Townsville and the growth of the Anglican Church in North Queensland. It housed the meetings of the Synod, church services during repairs to the cathedral, school classes and social and community functions. It is one of a group of buildings, including St James Cathedral, which still form the focus of the Anglican Church in Townsville.

The place demonstrates rare, uncommon or endangered aspects of Queensland's cultural heritage.

Built in 1897, it is one of few surviving examples of a timber public building constructed with an exposed timber frame, a technique important in the development of North Queensland. It is also one of few surviving timber public buildings in Townsville from that period.

The place is important in demonstrating the principal characteristics of a particular class of cultural places.

Its design demonstrates a response to the tropical climate with the use of a substantial roof vent, side verandahs and sliding doors, and timber shutters and window hoods. These hoods, shutters and other ornamentation of the primary facade combine to form a composition of architectural competence.

The place is important because of its aesthetic significance.

The hall, whilst not imposing, is a landmark on the city side of Melton Hill. It overlooks the Central Business District of Townsville, and is readily appreciated from Denham Street, a major thoroughfare.

The place has a strong or special association with a particular community or cultural group for social, cultural or spiritual reasons.

The hall has had a long association with the Anglican community, functioning as a parish centre for almost a century.
