= Drystone Wall, Melton Hill =

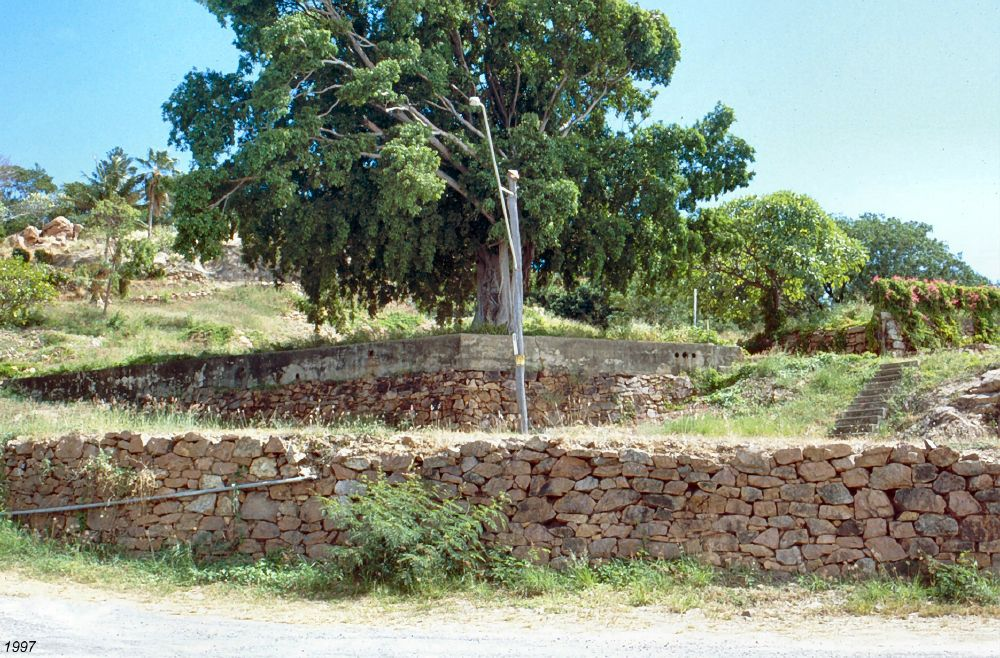
- Drystone Wall, Melton Hill, Townsville, 1997

- Location within Queensland Location within Australia
- 19.2555°S 146.8207°E
- Location: 2–4 Cleveland Terrace, Townsville CBD, City of Townsville, Queensland, Australia

History
- Design period: 1870s–1890s (late 19th century)
- Built: 1877

Queensland Heritage Register
- Official name: Drystone Wall, Melton Hill, Townsville, Queensland Transport, Townsville Library and School of Arts/Licence Testing Centre, Townsville Supreme Court
- Type: state heritage (archaeological)
- Designated: 7 February 2005
- Reference no.: 600885
- Significant period: 1870s (historical)
- Significant components: wall/s – retaining

Drystone Wall is a heritage-listed drystone wall at 2–4 Cleveland Terrace, Townsville CBD, City of Townsville, Queensland, Australia. It was built in 1877. It is also known as Queensland Transport, Townsville Library and School of Arts/Licence Testing Centre, and Townsville Supreme Court. It was added to the Queensland Heritage Register on 7 February 2005.

== History ==
The Drystone Wall, Melton Hill, Townsville is the only remaining physical evidence on the site of the former Townsville Supreme Court, which was constructed as the Townsville Library and School of Arts building. The building opened in September, 1877 and was designed and constructed by Townsville architect and building contractor Charles Alexander Ward, who "won a premium" of £10 for the design. In 1889 the Supreme Court Bill provided for the relocation of Queensland's Northern Supreme Court from Bowen to Townsville. By the end of that year plans were underway to convert the School of Arts to house the Northern Supreme Court. The alterations were carried out by Townsville building firm Rooney Brothers.

The School of Arts Reserve on Melton Hill was proclaimed in 1872, close to the site of the first court and customs houses which were constructed by 1872 and the first Town Hall. Also nearby were private residences, most notably that of FA Fryer and John Melton Black, founder of Townsville. The earliest survey plan for Melton Hill dated 26 June 1865 shows John Melton Black as the owner of three acres of the top of the hill. There is also a sketch plan made in around 1867–1868 for the Queensland Department of Public Works records shows John Melton Black's property extending down the hill as far as the north- eastern boundary of the School of Arts site. The main house, known as "Bachelor's Hall", was a four roomed building surrounded by verandahs with a detached kitchen. The main house was surrounded by four other buildings, an observatory and several structures downhill towards the original School of Arts site. It has been suggested that the drystone wall is the remains of the boundary walls of the property of James Melton Black, which if correct, would make them the oldest surviving structure in Townsville.

Planning for the School of Arts building began in January 1877 when the Committee sought government funding for the project. The government offered a thousand-pound if the local community raised five hundred pound. Difficulties arose over the location of the School of Arts on Melton Hill. Heated discussion took place within the Committee and in the community over whether the reserved land was too far from the business centre of the town, which, by 1877 was already moving westward along Flinders St. Argument revolved around a site in Sturt St, one in Flinders St near Denham St, and the Melton Hill site. Finally, at a meeting of the committee on 11 January 1877, the motion to build the new School of Arts on Melton Hill was carried 14 votes to 12.

On 3 February 1877 the School of Arts Committee resolved to call tenders for plans and specifications for the new building which was to have a large hall, reading room, a library and a room for a museum. The committee offered "a premium of ten pound" for the best plan. In March, 1877 the committee considered the five plans submitted and by an almost unanimous vote chose the design prepared by Charles Alexander Ward, of Townsville. Charles Ward worked in various capacities, as a contractor, joiner and cabinet maker. He operated a workshop which made furniture to order, as well as selling bedsteads and sewing machines. Besides the School of Arts he was architect and builder of a number of public and commercial buildings in Townsville including the (now demolished) Queensland Hotel.

Ward's tender for the construction of the School of Arts was accepted with the building completed by September 1877. The building was designed with a double storeyed section at the front and a hall behind. On the ground floor a central passageway led to the hall with a committee room and library on either side above the two front rooms was a reading room. The hall was 80 by 35 feet (24 m × 11 m), with a deep stage and a gallery at the upper level. The building had a corrugated iron roof and was constructed of timber imported from Maryborough.

On the 18 September 1877 a concert was given by the Orpheus Glee Club, which is believed to have marked the opening of the new School of Arts.

The new building became the focus of social and cultural life in Townsville. The School of Arts, which had the largest hall in the town, became the entertainment centre for the community. Concerts both by local amateurs and visiting theatrical troupes were staged regularly. It housed the first presentations of both full operas and oratorios in the town. It was also used as the first skating rink; it housed the exhibits of the early Townsville Shows and provided a venue for lectures on a variety of topics. Balls, fancy dress balls and banquets such as the one staged to greet the Premier in 1885, were also held in the building. The first evening classes in the town were held there. French, popular physiology, natural history, botany, photography, German, bookkeeping, architectural drawing and freehand drawing were some of the subjects taught.

Once the building was officially opened and operating, the Committee carried out a series of modifications. It appears that the installation of ceilings was not part of the original contract because the Committee "... decided to invite estimates for ceiling the hall, library and committee rooms of the building" in July 1875. Between 1877 and 1889, a skillion extension to the south was constructed and in 1878 a handsome proscenium was built especially for an amateur performance.

In 1874, as a result of the rapid development of North Queensland, the Queensland Government decided to appoint a Supreme Court judge to serve the northern part of the colony from Bowen. However, as Townsville's importance in the region grew there was a move to relocate the court. In September 1887 the issue was debated in parliament and a decision was made to relocate Queensland's Northern Supreme Court to Townsville. However, no action was taken at the time. In May, 1888 there was a change of government and two members for Townsville were elected. In March, 1889 a delegation of nine northern members requested the Premier implement the 1887 resolution, with the result that in September, 1889 the Supreme Court Bill was introduced which provided for the appointment of a second northern judge and for the removal of the court to Townsville.

While it appeared that the government first planned to construct a new court building, by December, 1889 plans were underway to convert the School of Arts for use as the Northern Supreme Court. No information has been found on the purchase of the School of Arts, however, a new theatre and library on the corner of Stanley and Walker Streets, were opened 27 May 1891 by the School of Arts Committee, using funds from the sale of the Melton Hill building.

The conversion of the building for use by the Supreme Court was dogged with difficulties. Well known North Queensland building and timber merchant firm Rooney Brothers, were selected by the Justice Department to do the work at a cost of between £950 and £1000. This quote covered the cost of the removal of skillion rooms and extension of the main building 20 feet (6.1 m) to the rear. The two storey portion of the building was to be extended 30 feet (9.1 m) over the hall and the stage was to be removed. Furniture for the Court Room was to be provided as well.

Rooney Brothers do not appear to have signed a contract nor were drawings prepared. Matthew Rooney was seen as a practical man who had particular expertise in solving problems using his skill with design and it is possible that he was chosen to carry out the alterations to the building because he was seen to have the required skills. During construction Rooney made design suggestions i.e. the extension of the western verandah and a flight of stairs to give the judge easy access to his rooms. Matthew Rooney also suggested that the windows be enlarged with circular heads and a lantern light be installed in the upper corridor to increase light in the building. The alterations cost £2703 and were the cause of some dispute with the Department of Works despite the fact that the extra work was authorised during construction.

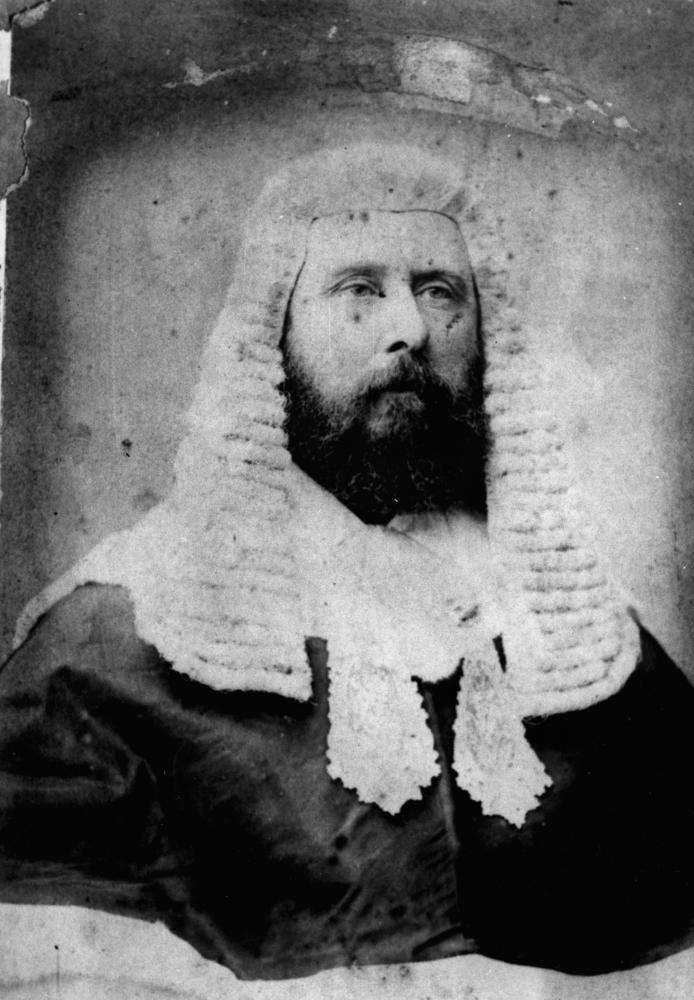
Justice Charles E. Chubb

Mr Justice Charles Edward Chubb, newly appointed Northern Judge is believed to have been involved in design changes to the building as well. The extent of his involvement is not known and, indeed, when the cost of alterations became an issue, he denied any substantial interference. It is known, however, that he did order the installation of venetian shutters.

During the subsequent one hundred years the building was altered in minor ways and severely damaged by cyclones on several occasions. In 1896 Cyclone Sigma caused damage to the roof, broke the lantern light to the upper hall, the roof of the strong room was blown off and the walls of the building damaged with water. In 1903 Cyclone Leonta damaged the roof, and destroyed the jury room. Roof damage occurred in 1940 and major damage to the whole building, including the roof, occurred in 1971 during Cyclone Althea. On New Year's Eve, 1965 an explosion, at the entrance to the building, destroyed the front doors. In 1961, a cell block was moved to the site from Railway Estate Police Station after the old cell block was demolished.

In 1970 the Supreme Court moved to new premises and the Vehicle Licensing Division of Department of Transport occupied the front section of the building. The building became vacant after the Department of Transport moved to new premises in the mid 1980s. In 1972 the caretaker's residence was sold for removal. In 1994 the roof was reinstated using Federal "One Nation" funding. The building was also painted around this time. However, on 14 April 1998, before the conservations works could be finished the former Townsville Supreme Court building was destroyed by fire. What little of the timber building that remained after the fire was later removed from the site due to safety concerns. The remains of the late nineteenth-century drystone wall is the only remaining physical evidence on the site. At the time the building was destroyed it was described as:

The axis of the building is north-south, with the main entry at the northern end facing Cleveland Terrace. The north facade has a two- storeyed verandah with crossed timber balustrades and curved boarded valances to both levels, and a central projecting portico with paired timber posts topped with a pediment and a flagpole as finial. The double entry doors have an arched fanlight, and large single pane double-hung windows with arched heads to either side. Behind are two levels of offices and chambers each side of a central corridor.

This northern section of the building has hipped roofs in a U-shaped configuration. There is a glazed lantern with curved domed roof on one of the ridges. The double-hung windows, smaller than those of the front, have two panes per sash and are shaded by continuous curved corrugated iron hoods. The walls are clad in weatherboards.

The interior of this section has walls lined with wide horizontal beaded boards, and high ceilings of double beaded boards. The entry has the remnant of a gold painted sign beside the arched opening. The room beside the entry retains its moulded timber counter. In the cupboard under the stair are small remnants of theatrical posters dating from 1879–1880. Doors here are typically low-waisted four panel, some with fanlights. The floors are timber boards.

In the upper level, the lantern provides a boarded rooflight to the central corridor. At the end of the corridor, an arched opening and timber balustrade form a balcony which overlooks the courtroom. To the very upper portion of the walls is a panel of perforated zinc ventilation grilles. The former Judges chambers retain their cedar bookshelves. From this level, the northern verandah has views over Cleveland Bay.

Detached to the west of this section is the strongroom of painted brick. It has a curved corrugated iron roof, iron door and small barred window.

The central part of the building is the single-storeyed Courtroom. The gabled roof has dormer windows and ventilators along its ridge. On the east side is the Courtroom's gabled entry porch, which has a scalloped bargeboard, boarded valance and timber posts with capitals. A verandah with similar valance runs the length of the western side. From this verandah, an external timber stair leads to the Judges' chambers.

The Courtroom has exposed scissor trusses with stop-chamfered members, and raked ceilings lined in diagonal boarding above. There is a dormer window to each side of the ridge. The large double-hung windows, two to each side, have single pane sashes and arched heads, and are similar to those beside the main entry. Again, the walls are lined in horizontal beaded boards and the floors timber.

To the southern end of the Courtroom is an elevated timber stage, with stairs to either side. Court furniture retained in place includes the cedar judges' bench with screen behind, the stand for the witness box, the defendant's dock, the jury stand, and a timber rail and tiered benches for the public at the rear.

To the rear of the Courtroom are three small offices at the level of the stage. From here, a link of latticed walls and curved corrugated iron roof connects to the Jury Room to the east. The Jury Room is a single timber room, with toilets added to the north. Its subfloor construction includes brickwork of an earlier building in this position. It has a pyramid roof and ventilator at its apex, and timber hoods to its windows.

Behind this block is a small brick shower room, with lean-to roof and boarded shutter. Behind the shower and of similar height, is a stone pitched retaining wall marking the rear of the site.

Along the western side of the main building runs a graded brick retaining wall, forming the terrace of the remainder of the site. Further to the west, is a timber cell block and a timber toilet block.

== Description ==
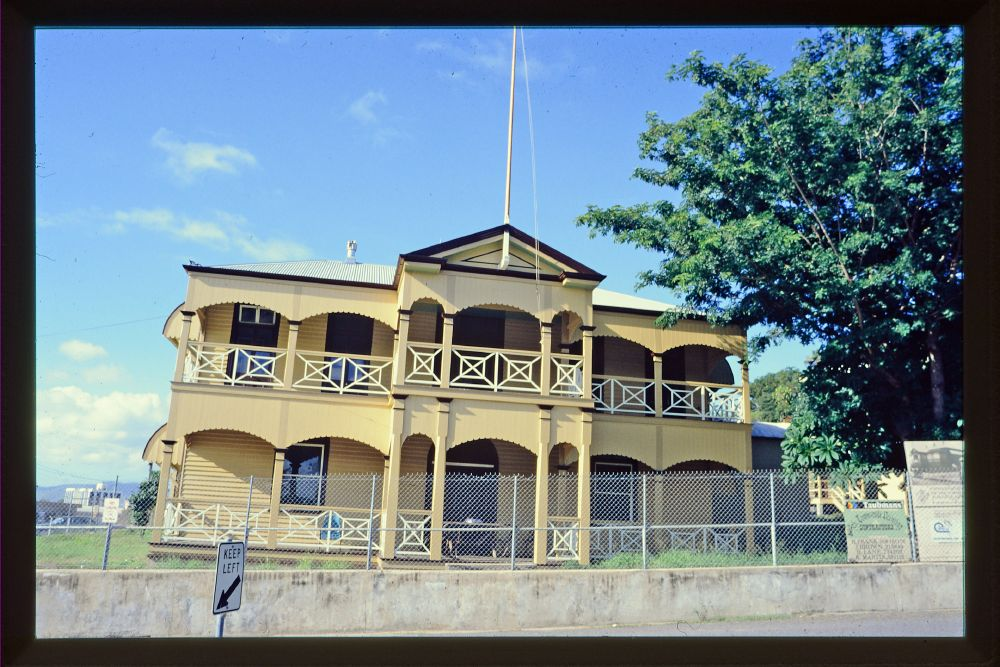
Former Townsville Supreme Court, 1994

The former Townsville Supreme Court was an imposing one and two- storeyed timber building with a corrugated iron roof. It was located on the north-eastern side of Melton Hill, part of the foothills of Castle Hill, and faced north over the Strand and Cleveland Bay. The platforms of the site are part of a series of terraces formed in the rocky hillside.

The site is on the corner of Melton and Cleveland Terraces. It sits between a group of public and government buildings (which includes the Townsville Customs House and the Townsville State Government Offices on the lower side of the hill), and a group of substantial early residences higher on the hill to the west.

The condition of the drystone wall varies from sound to areas of partial collapse or missing stones. The wall is situated on the boundary of Lot 3 on EP2361 and Lot 6 on T118300. The site is generally rocky and granite ridges run through the base of the wall continuing down the slope. The approximate 800 millimetres (31 in) width of the stone wall is neither straight nor parallel with the title boundary.

The wall is approximately 1.5 metres (4 ft 11 in) high however, it is thought to have been substantially higher, possibly as high as 1.8 metres (5 ft 11 in). Extensive fallen rock is visible on the ground within Lot 3 on EP2361. The rocks used to construct the wall are of random size, with some as large as 400 by 300 by 500 millimetres (16 in × 12 in × 20 in), and smaller fragments scattered among them.

There is a 100-millimetre (3.9 in) Metters cast iron pipe line running up the hill, approximately north-south, within Lot 6 on T118300. This descends into Cleveland Terrace where it enters an underground drain near a manhole manufactured by Northern Iron and Brass Foundry. Following the wet season the drystone wall is mostly covered with creeper vine, which restricts visual reference and additional research into the feature.

== Heritage listing ==
Drystone Wall, Melton Hill was listed on the Queensland Heritage Register on 7 February 2005 having satisfied the following criteria.

The place is important in demonstrating the evolution or pattern of Queensland's history.

The Drystone Wall, Melton Hill is important in demonstrating the evolution of Queensland's history. The drystone wall is all that remains on the site of the Former Townsville Supreme Court building. Initially constructed as a Library and School of Arts in 1877, the building was one of the largest timber School of Arts buildings in Queensland. It played an important part in the social life of Townsville in the late 1870s and through the 1880s. When it was completed the hall was the premier entertainment venue in Townsville. For 86 years the building served as the only timber supreme court building in Queensland. It is also distinguished by the fact that it was a converted building, which differed from the usual practice of purpose built court houses.

The place has potential to yield information that will contribute to an understanding of Queensland's history.

The Drystone Wall, Melton Hill, has potential to yield information that will contribute to an understanding of Queensland's history. In particular, the drystone pitched wall on Lot 3 on EP2361 and Lot 6 on T118300, have the potential to yield information on the early government and residential area of Townsville. The wall is believed to have been constructed in the late 19th century and has characteristic British origins, with its approximate 800 millimetres (31 in) width consistent with English walls. There is the possibility that the drystone wall may be associated with John Melton Black's private residence on Melton Hill c. 1867; it has the potential to extend the current body of knowledge about this early civic leader.
