= Warringa, Townsville =

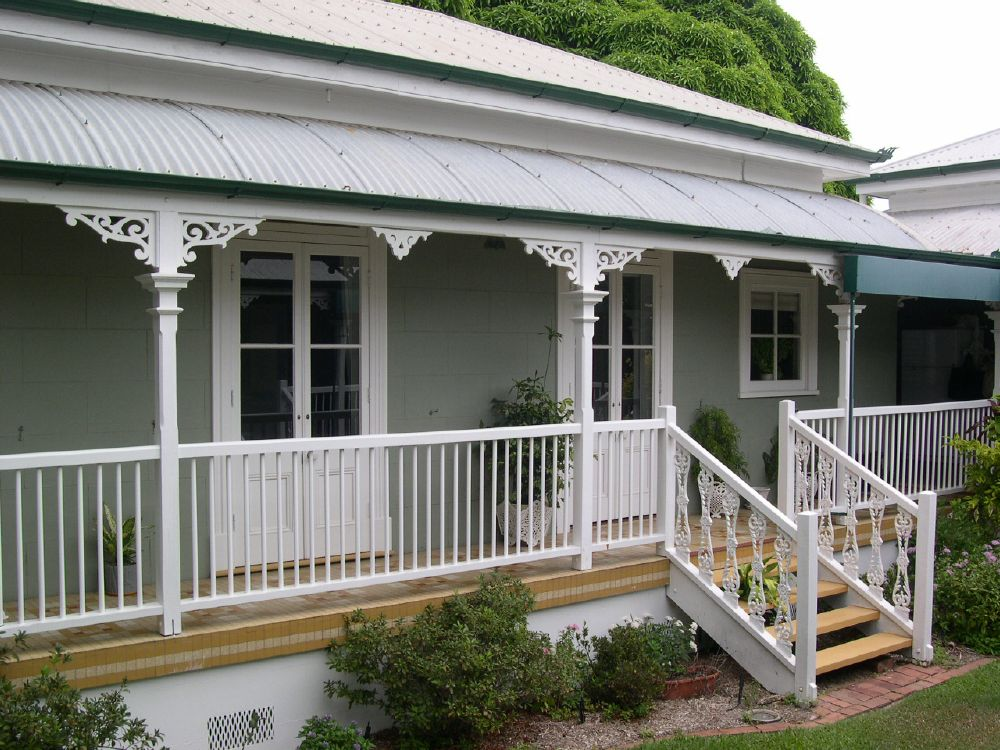
- Warringa, 2005

- Location within Queensland Location within Australia
- 19.2551°S 146.818°E
- Location: 26 Cleveland Terrace, Townsville CBD, City of Townsville, Queensland, Australia

History
- Design period: 1900–1914 (early 20th century)
- Built: 1912

Queensland Heritage Register
- Official name: Warringa
- Type: state heritage (landscape, built)
- Designated: 21 October 1992
- Reference no.: 600886
- Significant period: 1912 (fabric); 1912–1920s (historical)
- Significant components: garden/grounds, service wing, views to, residential accommodation – main house, views from
- Builders: Edward Crowder

Warringa is a heritage-listed villa at 26 Cleveland Terrace, Townsville CBD, City of Townsville, Queensland, Australia. It was built in 1912 by Edward Crowder. It was added to the Queensland Heritage Register on 21 October 1992.

== History ==
Warringa was erected in 1912 for Swiss-born Jacob Leu, a partner in the prominent Townsville law firm of Roberts and Leu, and his wife Susan. The builder was Edward Crowder of Townsville. Leu's parents had emigrated to Queensland in 1871, when Jacob was a child. He completed his education in Brisbane and in 1876 commenced his articles with Brisbane solicitor Daniel Foley Roberts. In 1881, Roberts' son George Alexander Roberts established a practice in Townsville, and Leu went with him as an articled clerk. After qualifying as a solicitor in 1884, Leu joined GA Roberts as a partner, the firm of Roberts and Leu developing into North Queensland's most prominent law practice. In 1886, Leu married Susan Hansen Overland. Following Jacob Leu's death in 1921, Susan Leu left Warringa. George Vivian Roberts (jnr), grandson of George Alexander Roberts, purchased the house in 1981.

== Description ==
Warringa is a large, single-storeyed brick residence located on a prominent site on Melton Hill, overlooking Cleveland Bay. The house is situated in a suburban environment among dwellings of a similar or earlier period, most of which are set amid tropical gardens. The house has a traditional plan form: a square core with pyramid-shaped roof of corrugated galvanised iron, and wide encircling verandahs with roofs separate from the main roof and decorated with cast-iron balustrading, fretwork brackets and double timber posts. A highly decorated portico projects over front steps centrally positioned. Two wings at the back of the house create a u-shaped courtyard, in which a small garden has been established. One is the original kitchen wing, now modified as two guest rooms; the other wing is a recent addition, comprising kitchen and sitting-room above a 3-car garage. Internally the building has high ceilings [some with pressed metal], large rooms, walls of rendered brick, and substantial silky oak joinery, including a large archway between lounge and dining rooms.

== Heritage listing ==
Warringa was listed on the Queensland Heritage Register on 21 October 1992 having satisfied the following criteria.

The place is important in demonstrating the evolution or pattern of Queensland's history.

Warringa, erected in 1912, is of cultural heritage significance for its class, aesthetic character and historical associations. It is an exceptional example of a large and elegant house of the late Federation era which is quite rare in the Townsville region, and even rarer for its use of brick at this period. It makes a prominent aesthetic contribution to the Cleveland Terrace streetscape and to the Townsville townscape. The place is also significant for its close associations with Jacob Leu and GV Roberts [jnr], both of whom were/are principal partners in the longstanding and influential North Queensland legal firm of Roberts, Leu and North.

The place demonstrates rare, uncommon or endangered aspects of Queensland's cultural heritage.

It is an exceptional example of a large and elegant house of the late Federation era which is quite rare in the Townsville region, and even rarer for its use of brick at this period.

The place is important in demonstrating the principal characteristics of a particular class of cultural places.

Warringa, erected in 1912, is of cultural heritage significance for its class, aesthetic character and historical associations.

The place is important because of its aesthetic significance.

It makes a prominent aesthetic contribution to the Cleveland Terrace streetscape and to the Townsville townscape.

The place has a special association with the life or work of a particular person, group or organisation of importance in Queensland's history.

The place is also significant for its close associations with Jacob Leu and GV Roberts [jnr], both of whom were/are principal partners in the longstanding and influential North Queensland legal firm of Roberts, Leu and North.
