= Townsville Baptist Church =

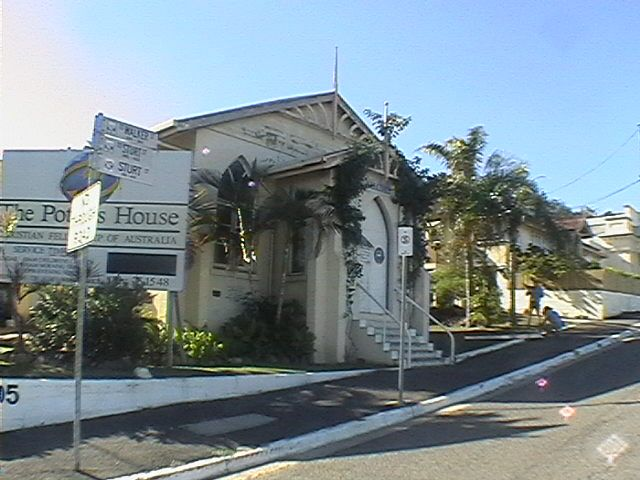
- Former Townsville Baptist Church, 2003

- Location within Queensland Location within Australia
- 19.265°S 146.8099°E
- Location: 513 Sturt Street, Townsville CBD, City of Townsville, Queensland, Australia

History
- Design period: 1919–1930s (interwar period)
- Built: 1922

Queensland Heritage Register
- Official name: Potters House, Townsville Baptist Church
- Type: state heritage (landscape, built)
- Designated: 27 February 2004
- Reference no.: 602253
- Significant period: 1920s (historical) ongoing (social)
- Significant components: church, views to, trees/plantings, church hall/Sunday school hall

Townsville Baptist Church is a former heritage-listed church building at 513 Sturt Street, Townsville CBD, City of Townsville, Queensland, Australia. It was built in 1922. Since 1985, it has been occupied by the Potter's House Christian Fellowship. It was added to the Queensland Heritage Register on 27 February 2004.

== History ==
The former Townsville Baptist Church is a rendered masonry church with attached timber hall. It was built in 1922 using secondhand bricks from another building and salvaged timber from a previous church on the site that was damaged by Cyclone Leonta in 1903. The church was sold by the Baptist Church in 1981, but its use as a place of worship and meeting has continued.

Services of worship for members of the Baptist Church commenced in Townsville in January 1888 in rented premises. In 1891 the Townsville Baptist Church bought the land and two cottages (at the rear of the allotment) from the original landholder, Duncan McVean, for £500. At the time the allotment took up one half of the length of Fletcher Street between Sturt and Walker streets. This block has been subdivided, re-subdivided and amalgamated but the front portion facing Sturt Street was in continuous use by the Baptist Church from its purchase until its sale in 1981 when the Church moved to Kirwan.

In 1893, a vacant Congregationalist church building and contents were purchased and re-erected on the Sturt Street site. The first service was held in November 1893. In January 1903 the building was damaged by Cyclone Leonta. A church hall was erected using the remains that was salvaged. However, Church records from 1912 reveal that this structure was intended to be temporary. A building fund was set up for a new church and hall, but it was not until 1922 that a replacement church was built. Lack of funds precluded a completely new building. Therefore a second hand one was found in the form of a disused powder magazine, eight miles from Townsville at Brookhill and purchased. The congregation dismantled and cleaned around 30,000 bricks. The building contract was signed for £832/6/- and the foundation stone was laid on 8 July 1922. It is highly likely that at this time the old timber church hall was attached to the rear of the new church. The new church opened on Saturday 23 September 1922.

Church records reveal that work to the hall was carried out in 1949. In 1957–58 steps were constructed to the rear and the guttering and downpipes were replaced. In 1959–60, the Townsville City Council resumed eight feet of the property at the front of the church for road purposes, which brought the front steps to the edge of the footpath. The front stone retaining wall was built by the council in 1962. The concrete toilet block was added to the church hall in 1969–70 and the Church was repaired in 1971–2 following damage sustained during Cyclone Althea.

In 1981, the land and buildings were sold because the Townsville City Church and the Currajong Baptist Church were both too small. The congregations decided to combine and bought a new property at Kirwan. The Sturt Street property was onsold four additional times until the present owners purchased the property in 1994. It has been occupied and used as a place of worship by the Potter's House Christian Fellowship since approximately 1985.

== Description ==
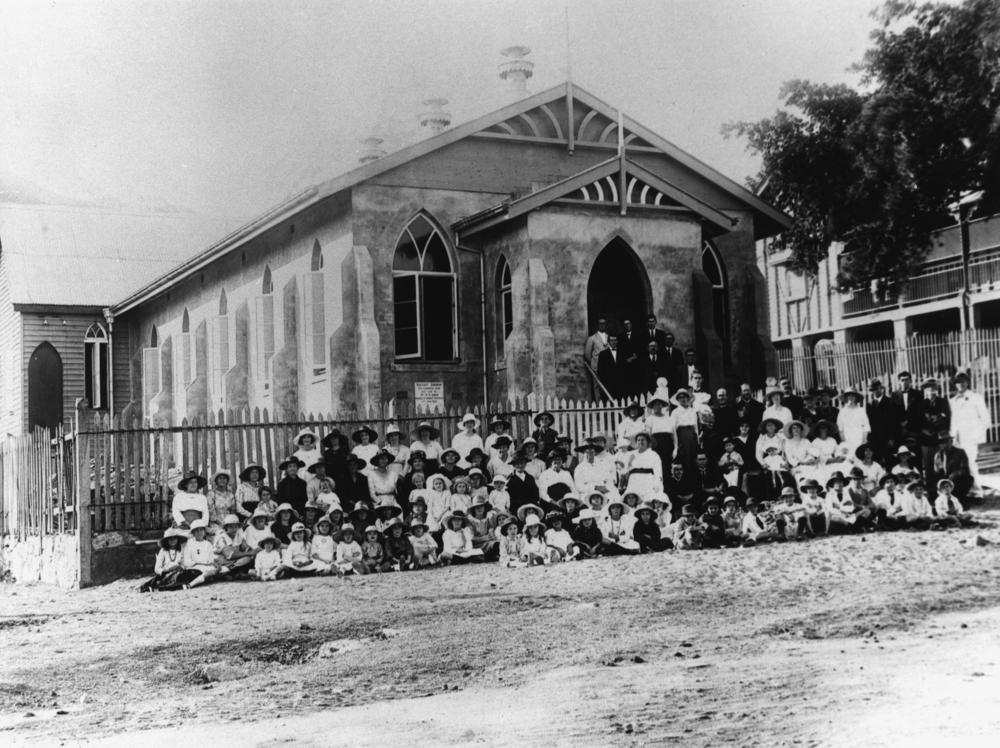
Townsville Baptist Church, 1923

The Townsville Baptist Church is prominently located on the corner of Sturt and Fletcher Streets, Townsville. The site is 521 square metres (5,610 sq ft) in area and is located on a side road on the northern side of Sturt Street overlooking Ross Creek. Plantings on the site include palms and frangipani with recent garden beds.

The church is a single storey rendered brick building with buttressed walls built directly onto the exposed granite surface of the site. The natural contours of the granite are readily visible within the grounds and along the length of the building. The church has a timber floor, a corrugated iron roof and a simple rectangular form with a small front entrance porch facing Sturt Street. The porch and church proper have gable ends lined with boards and decorated with timber battens and finial. The northern end of the church roof is hipped.

Stairs leading from the entrance porch meet the footpath. There are five pointed arch windows along each side wall of the church, with one either side of the front entrance in the southern wall. The windows have pairs of 3 light sashes and comprise an irregular mix of coloured and plain glass panes. The entrance porch houses a pointed arch double door to the southern elevation and single pointed arch window with 2-light sashes to its side walls.

The hall is attached at right angles to the rear of the church and is a single storey timber framed and lined and clad building raised on stumps with a gabled corrugated iron roof and boarded ceiling. Timber battens are located around the understorey. The exterior weatherboard cladding has been lined with plastic moulded weatherboard sheeting. There are two pointed arch windows with single 6 light sashes to the western wall and 7 pointed arch windows in the northern wall which also contain a mix of coloured and plain glass panes. At the eastern end, toilets have been constructed of concrete block with a corrugated iron skillion roof. The hall and toilets are not considered to be of cultural heritage significance.

The interior of the church is a simple open space with decorative embellishment. A platform is located across the northern end of the church from which a pair of doors lead into the hall. A pointed arch in the southern end provides access to the entrance porch. The walls are rendered and the coffered ceiling is lined with beaded boards. The ceiling houses 5 fretwork ceiling roses positioned between the tie rods which brace the building.

== Heritage listing ==
The former Townsville Baptist Church was listed on the Queensland Heritage Register on 27 February 2004 having satisfied the following criteria.

The place is important in demonstrating the evolution or pattern of Queensland's history.

The Townsville Baptist Church site demonstrates part of the pattern of Queensland's history through its continued use as a place of Christian worship since 1893, and particularly in its association with the Baptist Church from 1893 until 1981.

The place is important in demonstrating the principal characteristics of a particular class of cultural places.

The principal structure on the site comprises a substantially intact early 20th Century Baptist church (1922) which is important in illustrating the principal characteristics of its type, reflecting in the lack of ornate decorative detailing and plain interiors, the essence of Protestant worship.

The place is important because of its aesthetic significance.

Located on a rise on the northern side of Sturt Street, the Townsville Baptist Church makes a contribution to the streetscape at the intersection of the residential and commercial areas.

The place has a strong or special association with a particular community or cultural group for social, cultural or spiritual reasons.

The church, valued by the community as a meeting place for the Baptist Church community, demonstrates the commitment and resourcefulness of that community, which, with limited funds, was able to erect the present building, by the salvaging and recycling of other buildings and materials, both on and off site.
