= Stanton House, Townsville =

Stanton House
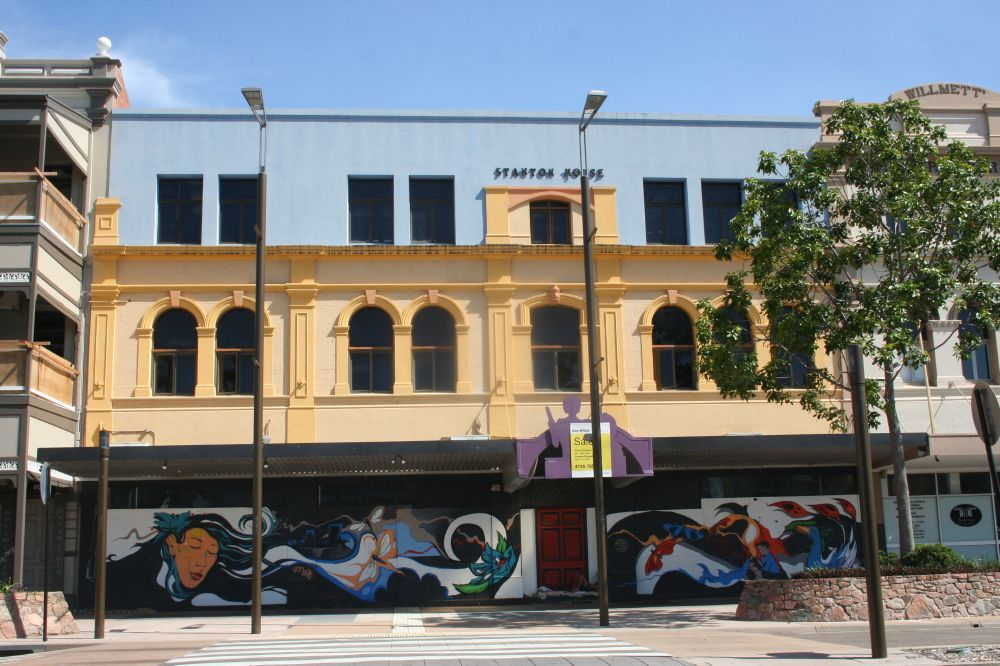
- Stanton House, 2012

- Location within Queensland Location within Australia
- 19.2574°S 146.8194°E
- Location: 197–203 Flinders Street, Townsville CBD, City of Townsville, Queensland, Australia

History
- Design period: 1870s–1890s (late 19th century)
- Built: 1885–1930s

Site notes
- Architectural style: Classicism

Queensland Heritage Register
- Official name: Stanton House, Hof's Building
- Type: state heritage (built)
- Designated: 21 October 1992
- Reference no.: 600899
- Significant period: 1880s, 1930s (historical); 1933–1978 (social)
- Significant components: registry, views to, shop/s, office/s

Stanton House is a heritage-listed office building at 197–203 Flinders Street, Townsville CBD, City of Townsville, Queensland, Australia. It was built from 1885 to 1930s. It is also known as Hof's Building. It was added to the Queensland Heritage Register on 21 October 1992.

== History ==
Stanton House was constructed in 1885 for John Frederick Hof, who had owned the land since 1867, and replaced two timber shops on the same block.

Townsville was established in 1864 by partners John Melton Black and Robert Towns and was gazetted as a port of entry in 1865. It grew quickly as a supply centre and by 1873 the port was receiving international as well as coastal traffic. Improvements were carried out to improve port facilities and to allow larger ships to anchor. By 1880 Townsville was the port for several major goldfields and had opened the first stage of the railway line westwards through Charters Towers and beyond, consolidating its importance as a port and mercantile centre. Retail business was an important part of this development. John Frederick Hof arrived in Victoria from Germany in 1856 and worked on a number of goldfields in that colony as a carrier. Moving to Queensland in 1861, he followed a variety of occupations before working again as a carrier at the Cape River diggings in North Queensland. He also took up speculative ventures in mining, acquiring a crushing plant at Georgetown in partnership with Willmett. In 1882 this was sold to the Papa Company and Hof moved to Townsville at the beginning of 1883 with a view to building a set of shops on his Flinders Street block.

Recent fires had destroyed a number of buildings in Flinders Street and it was declared a first class area, where only building in stone, masonry or metal was permitted. This meant that timber buildings from the first stage of settlement were being replaced with substantial masonry ones, an encouragement to do likewise even for those whose property had escaped fire damage. Because of the subsequent building boom, labour and materials were scarce and some buildings remained at the planning stage for extended periods. Presumably in response to this, Hof set up the Brunswick Brick and Tile Works and is said to have used bricks produced by himself for "Hof's Buildings" completed in 1885. This and other buildings effected a redevelopment of the street which reflected the success of the town as a commercial centre. By 1900 there was a line of handsome and fashionable buildings down both sides of Flinders Street.

Hof's new premises were 2 storeys high and comprised 3 shops with an entrance hall and stairway leading to offices on the upper floor. Leases were immediately taken out by Otto Geburek and Michael Sandstein and Philip Harris. The Beale & Co. Ltd piano and musical instrument showroom, who occupied the largest of the premises, held a special event with demonstrations of piano playing in late May to mark their opening. Willmett's printery business next door responded to a perceived need by offering sheet music for sale.

A number of tenants leased space in the building for many years. The New Zealand Insurance Company's initial lease began in 1906 and they did not move out until 1935, the Mains Roads Commissioner had offices in the building throughout the 1930s and by 1944 were occupying space on the top floor extension added in the late 1930s. When this occurred the original decorated parapet was not reinstated.

In 1933 the building was purchased by the Corporation of the Diocesan Synod of North Queensland, although it was already used as the Diocesan Registry. The building was named "Stanton House" in honour of George Henry Stanton who became the first Bishop of North Queensland in 1878.

The Diocese sold the building in 1978. It has changed hands several times since and continues to be leased for various commercial purposes. Although renovations have taken place, the layout and functioning of the 3 original shops and offices are still discernible.

At the time of heritage listing, Timezone, an amusement centre, occupied most of the ground and first floors. They no longer operate in Townsville; by May 2015, the building was vacant, boarded up at ground floor, and advertised for sale. In January 2016, the building was still being advertised for sale.

== Description ==
Stanton House is one of a group of nineteenth century commercial buildings situated at the eastern end of Flinders Street, the major commercial street of Townsville.

The building backs on to Melton Hill and the top storey does not run for the full depth of the building. The two lower storeys are of brick rendered at the front and the later section to the top is of concrete and is much plainer in form. The street elevation is asymmetrical and has two pairs of windows on one side of the entrance and stairwell and three windows on the other, indicating the position and size of the original shop space. The fenestration on both upper floors demonstrates this arrangement of space. The ground floor has modern shop fronts with aluminium framed windows sheltered by a modern cantilevered awning. The front door is flanked by glass panels and has glass transoms. The timber staircase to the first floor remains, as do most internal walls.

The first floor has rounded headed windows separated by decorated pilasters and a smaller central window at the head of the staircase. The top storey has similarly spaced rectangular windows and is very plain. The parapet is severely plain and conceals the metal clad roof.

== Heritage listing ==
Stanton House was listed on the Queensland Heritage Register on 21 October 1992 having satisfied the following criteria.

The place is important in demonstrating the evolution or pattern of Queensland's history.

The rapid growth of Townsville in the late 19th century occurred because of the way in which North Queensland was developed by the establishment of key ports as commercial and administrative centres. Stanton House, as a substantial masonry commercial building of the 1880s, demonstrates the prosperity of Townsville in that period when considerable redevelopment was taking place in the city centre.

The place is important in demonstrating the principal characteristics of a particular class of cultural places.

Stanton House, in spite of alterations, is a good example of a commercial building of its era, being a set of substantial masonry shops with offices above.

The place is important because of its aesthetic significance.

In form, scale and detail, Stanton House makes a major visual contribution to the streetscape of Flinders Street. It forms part of an important group of nineteenth century commercial buildings at the eastern end of the street.

The place has a strong or special association with a particular community or cultural group for social, cultural or spiritual reasons.

As the Anglican Diocesan Registry for many years it has an association with the development of the church in North Queensland.
