= Samuel Allen & Sons Building =

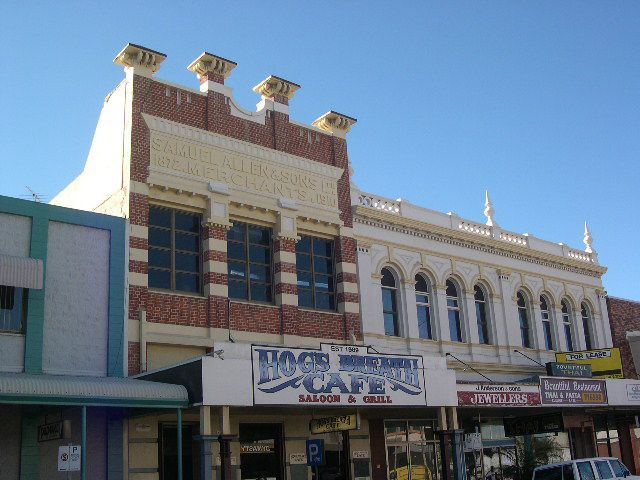
- Samuel Allen & Sons Building, 2002

- Location within Queensland Location within Australia
- 19.2578°S 146.8184°E
- Location: 247 Flinders Street, Townsville CBD, City of Townsville, Queensland, Australia

History
- Design period: 1870s–1890s (late 19th century)
- Built: 1881–1910

Queensland Heritage Register
- Official name: Hogs Breath Cafe, Samuel Allen & Sons
- Type: state heritage (built)
- Designated: 21 October 1992
- Reference no.: 600903
- Significant period: 1880s, 1910s (fabric); 1881–c. 1991 (historical use as shop)

Samuel Allen & Sons Building is a heritage-listed commercial building at 247 Flinders Street, Townsville CBD, City of Townsville, Queensland, Australia. It was built from 1881 to 1910. It was also known as Hogs Breath Cafe. It was added to the Queensland Heritage Register on 21 October 1992.

== History ==
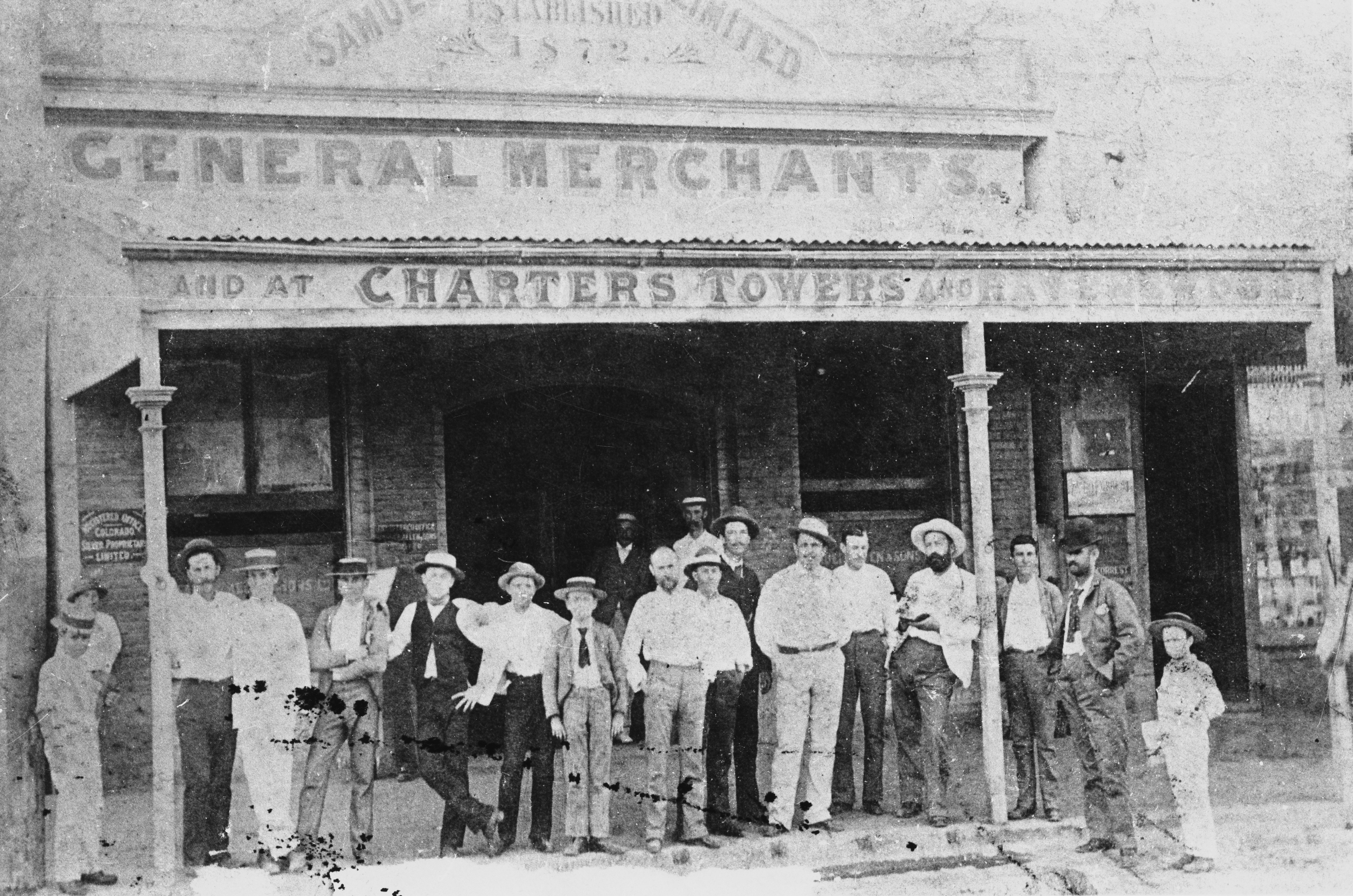
Samuel Allen building before the 1st floor extensions, ca. 1898

This building was constructed in 1881 as a single-storeyed produce store for Samuel Allen & Company (later Samuel Allen & Sons). The company had been established in Townsville since 1872 and became an Australia-wide mercantile firm.

With the expansion of the firm, a second floor was added in 1910 and the facade was altered with the addition of a heavily decorated parapet.

After the building was sold in 1979 the ground floor facade was renovated.

In 1991 the structure was converted to a cafe/nightclub. It later became a branch of the Hog's Breath Cafe restaurant chain. As at March 2016, the building was for sale subject to the existing tenancy of a Brazilian churrascarria restaurant.

== Description ==
The building is constructed of brick with contrasting bands of stucco on the facade. It is surmounted by a parapet with heavy decorative accents, which conceals the corrugated iron roof.

The window frames have been replaced with aluminium and the ground floor facade has been painted cream.

The 1910 street awning, with timber supports, remains intact although a large sign has been added.

Most of the interior has been altered, but the original ceiling of the upper floor remains.

The building, although altered internally, survives among a group of colonial to federation period structures in a commercial streetscape.

== Heritage listing ==
The Samuel Allen & Sons Building was listed on the Queensland Heritage Register on 21 October 1992 having satisfied the following criteria.

The place is important in demonstrating the evolution or pattern of Queensland's history.

The place is important in demonstrating the principal characteristics of a particular class of cultural places.

The place has a special association with the life or work of a particular person, group or organisation of importance in Queensland's history.

The building, constructed in two stages (1881 and 1910), is significant historically as the Townsville headquarters of the important trading firm of Samuel Allen & Sons, and is a surviving example of a late 19th century commercial building.

The place is important because of its aesthetic significance.

It contributes to a distinctive historical commercial streetscape at the western end of Flinders Street East.
