= Commercial Bank of Australia Building, Townsville =

Commercial Bank of Australia Building
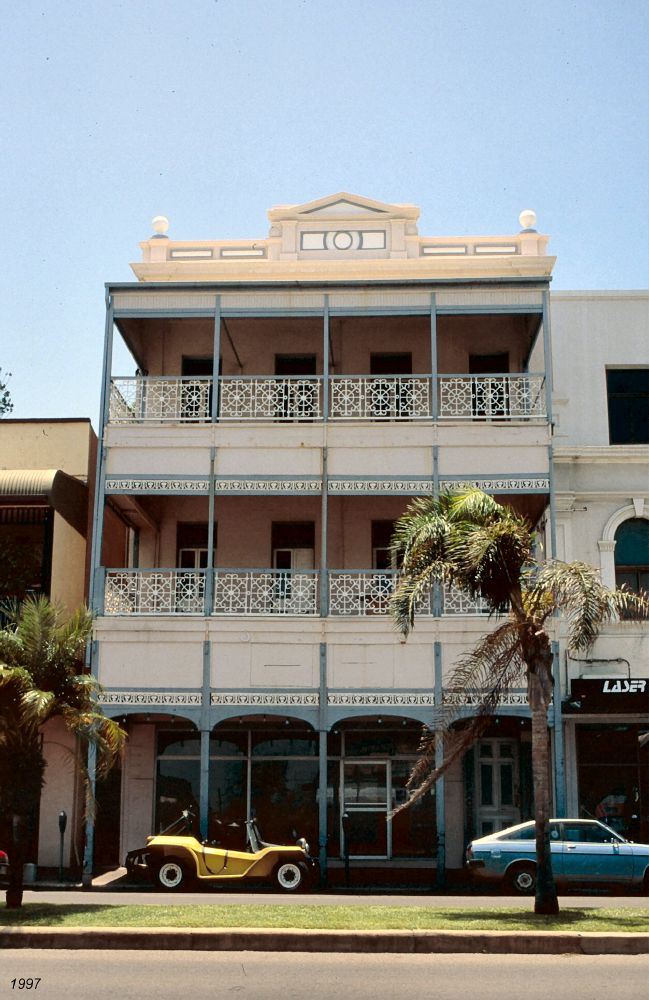
- Commercial Bank of Australia Building, 1997

- Location within Queensland Location within Australia
- 19.2575°S 146.8193°E
- Location: 205–207 Flinders Street, Townsville CBD, City of Townsville, Queensland, Australia

History
- Design period: 1870s–1890s (late 19th century)
- Built: c. 1897

Site notes
- Architect: James Percy Owen Cowlishaw

Queensland Heritage Register
- Official name: Atinee Building
- Type: state heritage (built)
- Designated: 21 October 1992
- Reference no.: 600900
- Significant period: 1890s (fabric) c. 1897–c. 1938 (historical use by CBC)
- Builders: J C Harrison & Sons

The Commercial Bank of Australia Building is a heritage-listed former bank building at 205–207 Flinders Street, Townsville CBD, City of Townsville, Queensland, Australia. It was designed by James Percy Owen Cowlishaw and built c. 1897 by J C Harrison & Sons. It is also known as the Atinee Building. It was added to the Queensland Heritage Register on 21 October 1992.

== History ==
The building was erected in c. 1897 and was the second premises of the Commercial Bank of Australia. The Bank operated from this building for forty-one years and the Relatino Restaurant for twenty-three years from 1955. Recently the building has become well known as the Back Packers Hostel.

In March 2016, it was occupied by Zambrero, a Mexican fast food restaurant, and a Latin dancing studio.

== Description ==
This symmetrical three-storeyed building of the Federation period has deep shady verandahs on the upper two levels. These verandahs, which extend over the footpath, are decorated with cast-iron balustrades and friezes, together with timber fretwork.

The ground floor shop front and interior have been modernised while the upper floors remain basically intact. The brick building, which is well designed for the tropics, is surmounted by a parapet and centrally placed pediment. While the structure is in need of maintenance, it is still in reasonable condition and its integrity is basically intact.

== Heritage listing ==
The building was listed on the Queensland Heritage Register on 21 October 1992 having satisfied the following criteria.

The place is important in demonstrating the evolution or pattern of Queensland's history.

The impressive style of the structure emphasises the role the Commercial Bank of Australia played in the economic growth of the region during the early twentieth century.

The place demonstrates rare, uncommon or endangered aspects of Queensland's cultural heritage.

The building is commercial structure of unusual design in the Townsville region and as such it is a feature of the streetscape in Flinders Street.

The place is important in demonstrating the principal characteristics of a particular class of cultural places.

It is a good example of a commercial building constructed with wide verandahs and decorated with timber and cast iron.

The place is important because of its aesthetic significance.

The building is commercial structure of unusual design in the Townsville region and as such it is a feature of the streetscape in Flinders Street.
