= Cleveland Bay (Queensland) =

Bay in Queensland, Australia

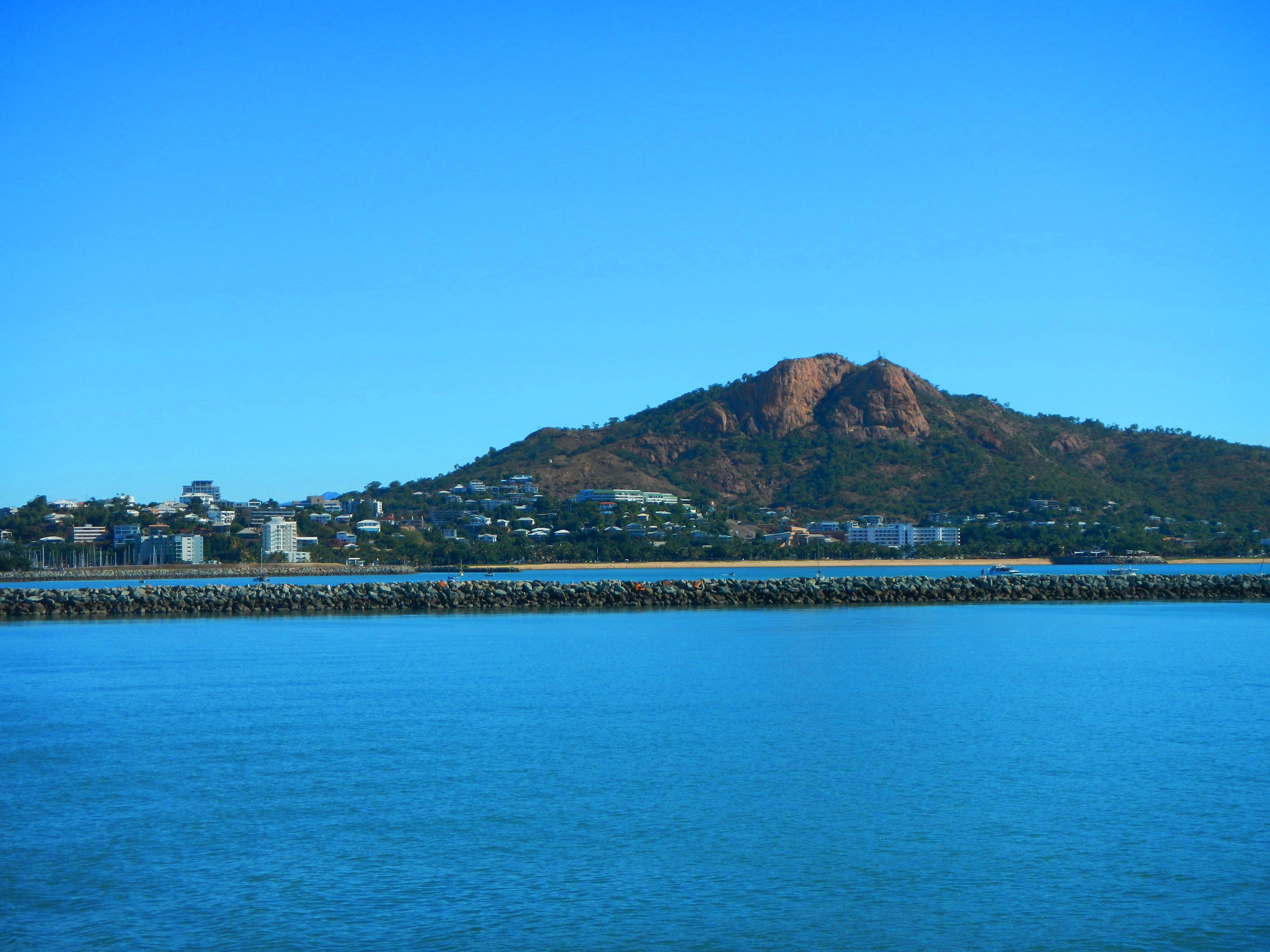
- Townsville seen from Cleveland Bay

- Location within Queensland
- Location: North Queensland
- Coordinates: 19°13′05″S 146°55′19″E
- Part of: Coral Sea
- Islands: Magnetic Island

Cleveland Bay is a bay on the north-eastern coast of Queensland, Australia. It is part of the Coral Sea and, administratively, is within the City of Townsville.

Entrance to the bay is marked by the Cape Cleveland Light and in earlier years by the Bay Rock Light on Magnetic Island.

== History ==
Cleveland Bay was named by Lieutenant (later Captain) James Cook on HM Bark Endeavour on 6 June 1770, probably in honour of John Clevland, Secretary to the Admiralty 1751–1763. However, Cook may have named the bay after the Cleveland Hills near his birthplace of Marton in Yorkshire, England.

The Alligator Creek meatworks was built on the Bay, employing 1500 people at its peak and was a landmark in the area until 1966. The Creek that lead into the Bay had blood rich effluent from the meatworks pumped into it, which may have changed the natural ecosystem and fish stock in the Bay.
