= Laidley Pioneer Village and Museum =

Open-air museum in Laidley, Queensland, Australia

Laidley Pioneer Village & Museum
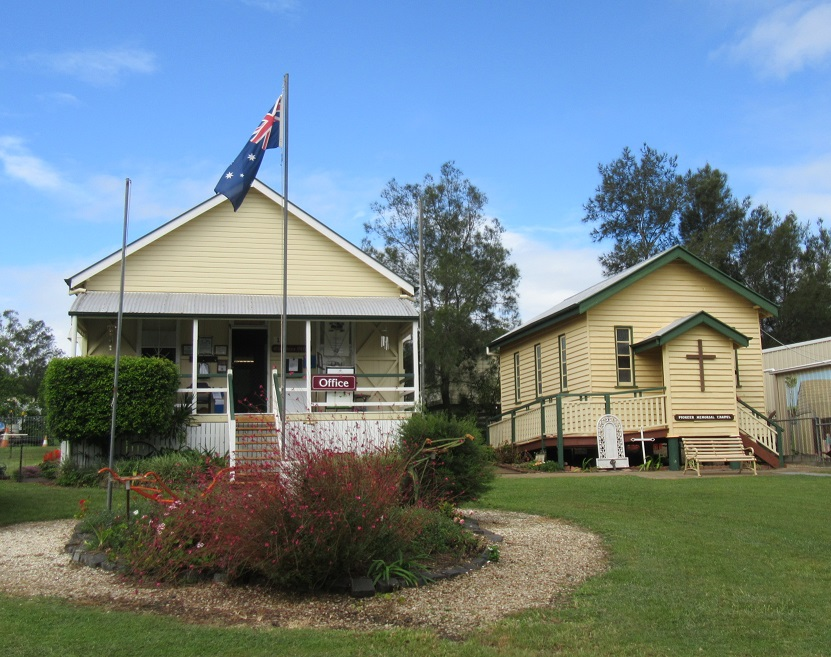
- Laidley Pioneer Village council chamber and chapel
- Established: 1972
- Location: Australia, 92 Drayton Street, Laidley, Lockyer Valley Area, Queensland 4341
- Coordinates: 27°39′00″S 152°23′29″E
- Type: historic open-air museum
- Owner: Laidley District Historical Society Incorporated
- Employees: volunteers
- Public transit access: Mondays to Sundays; 9am to 3pm
- Website: https://www.laidleypioneervillage.org.au/

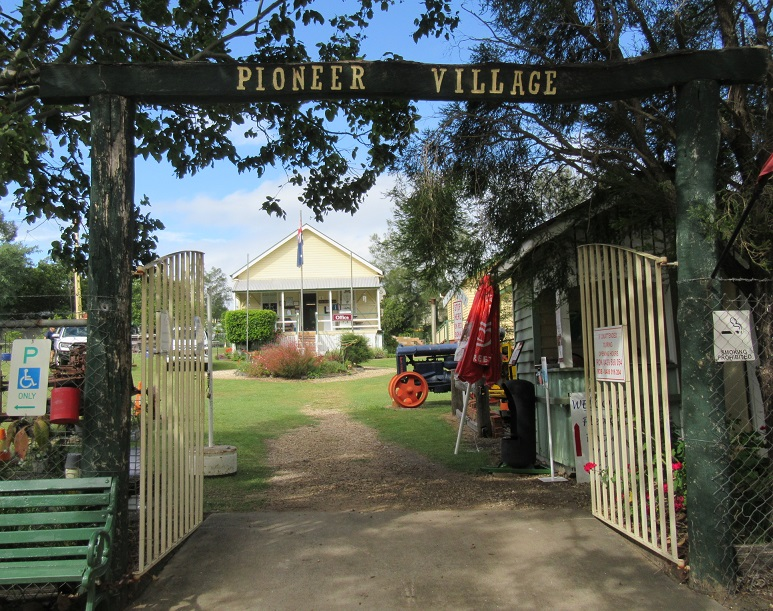
Laidley Pioneer Village entry

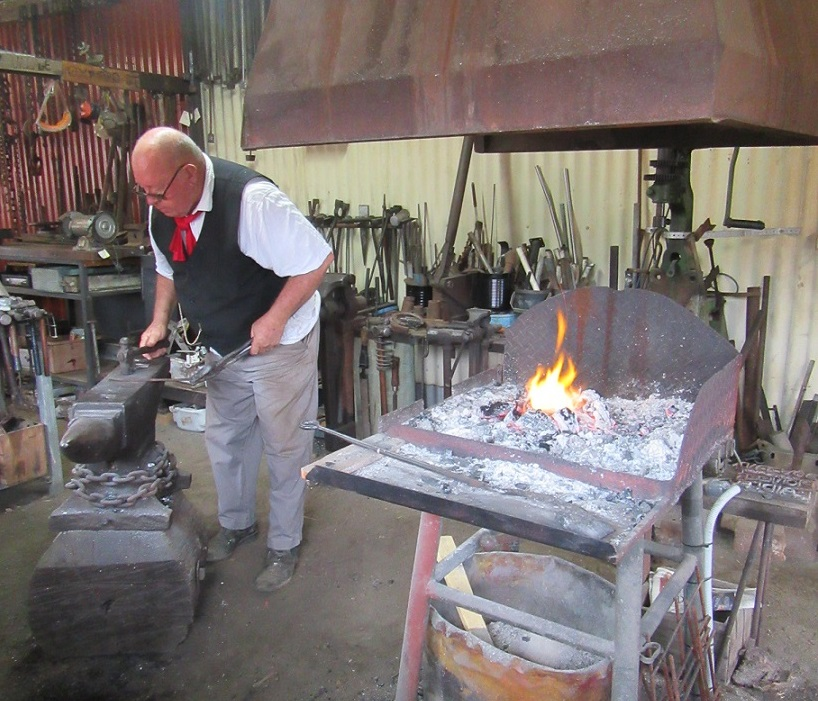
Laidley Pioneer Village blacksmith demonstration

The Laidley Pioneer Village & Museum is an historic open-air museum located in the town of Laidley, Lockyer Valley Region, Queensland, Australia, on the corner of Drayton Street and Pioneer Street. It portraits rural life in Queensland from the early 19th century.

== History ==
The Laidley region was once the home of the "Kitabul People" before the arrival of Europeans in the early 19th century. Today, the Ugarapul People are the traditional owners of the Lockyer Valley region.

The Laidley Pioneer Village was the first museum of the heritage village type in Queensland when it was established in 1972. It is located on the site of a former resting paddock used for the horses of the Cobb & Co coaching business along the original transport route from Ipswich to Toowoomba.

The museum is run by volunteers and members of the non-profit organisation Laidley District Historical Society Incorporated.

== Display ==
The village displays the lifestyle of the early pioneers in the area and the history of the timber and farming industries from the early 19th century. Displays include restored buildings, such as a tractor shed and the old shire office, post office and general store, the old police cells from the Laidley Police Complex, an old butcher shop and a fully furnished 110 year old year school (the former Blantyre State School). The buildings contain common items of use of the era, including household items, telephone exchanges, police handcuffs, butcher's and blacksmith's tools, furniture, vehicles and machinery. Buildings and items were collected from a wider area in South East Queensland.

The old Laidley Council Chamber building is now the entry to the museum. It was originally the administration office for local Government at the turn of the 20th century.

The Pioneer Memorial Chapel can still be used for Weddings and other functions. The chapel was once the Blenheim Methodist Chapel, then the Berryman Baptist Church after being moved to Mount Berryman in 1942. It was moved to the Pioneer Village in 2009 when it was 124 years old. The church was restored and pews were received from the Mt. Sylvia Catholic Church and other furniture from St George's Anglican Church at Thornton. On display in the chapel are old religious books and a bible written in German.

A cottage that was the home of the DesJardins family, pioneers who lived in Gehrkevale (now Mount Mort), was built in a way common at the time using ironbark for slab walls and a shingle roof. The outside walls were lined for warmth with hessian and then newspapers and journals glued on with flour and water paste. For preservation purposes, the roof has been covered with tin, but the shingles are still visible from inside.

The agricultural collection displays vintage machinery and equipment, including a Linn Tractor (ca. 1928).

The wagon display exhibits examples of German horse-drawn farm carts and wagons, as well as items of rural farming and industrial machinery.

The carriage display shows examples of the early buggy and sulky era and tools used in their manufacture and maintenance.

Other buildings and exhibitions include a pre-Medicare hospital, a dairy and bails, early 1900s fashion and accessories, war memorabilia, children's toys, photography equipment and portraits, and stationary engines and pumps.

On Wednesdays, special occasions or upon request, visitors can see blacksmith demonstrations.

The museum takes part in annual festivities, such as the Lockyer Valley Heritage Festival in autumn, the Laidley Spring Festival in September and Australia Day celebrations.

It also has a school education program which invites school groups to participate in guided tours and creating project books.

== Gallery ==
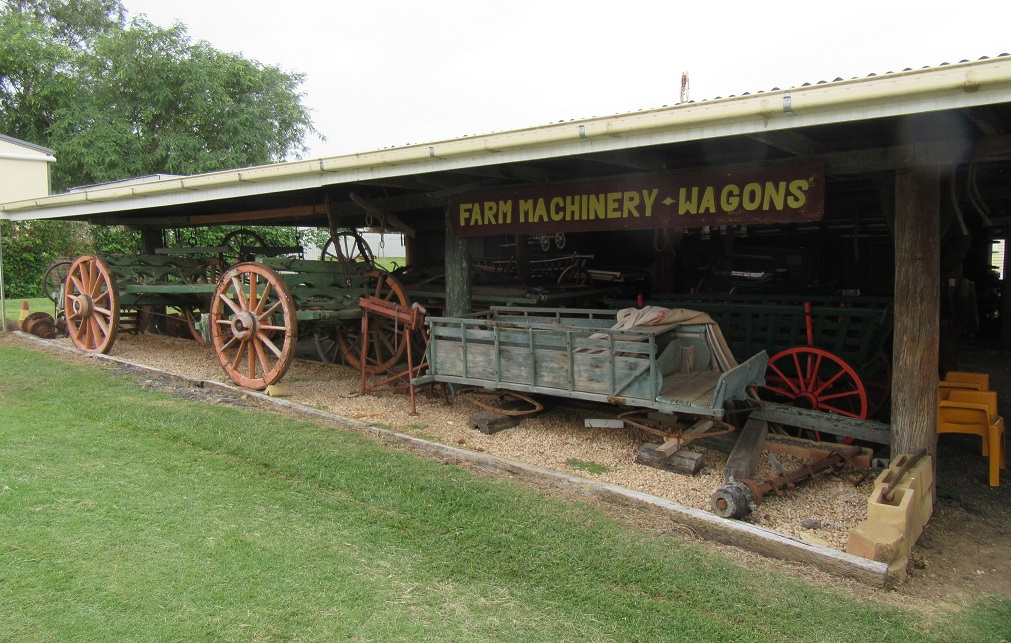
Farm machinery and wagons

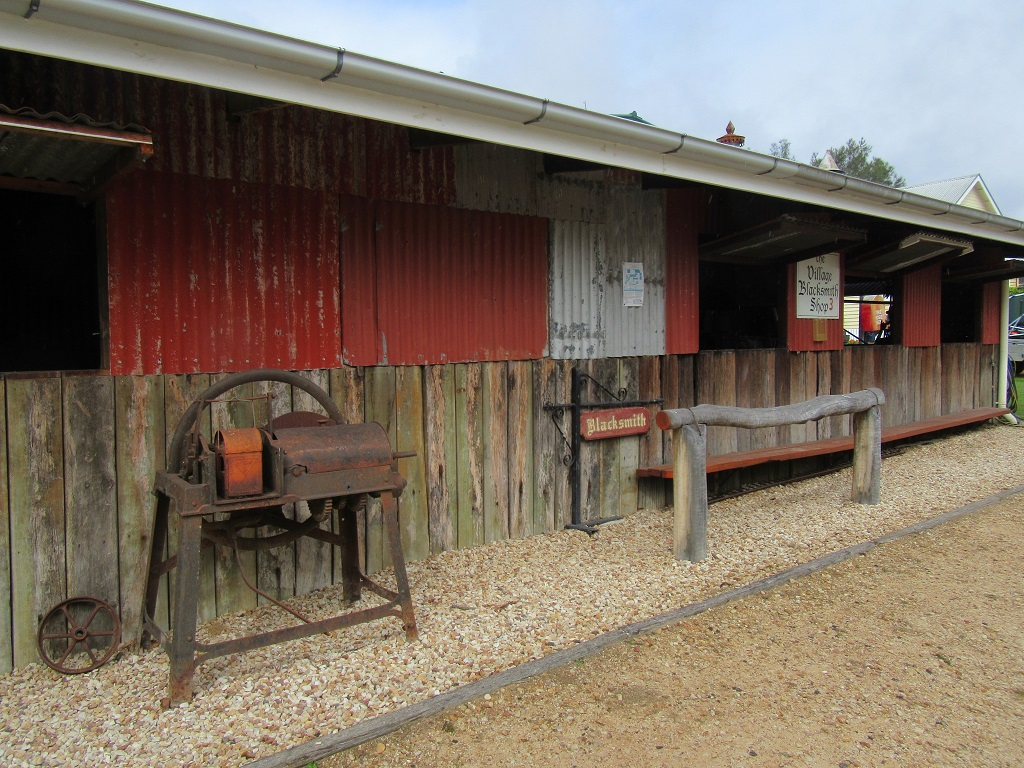
Blacksmith shed

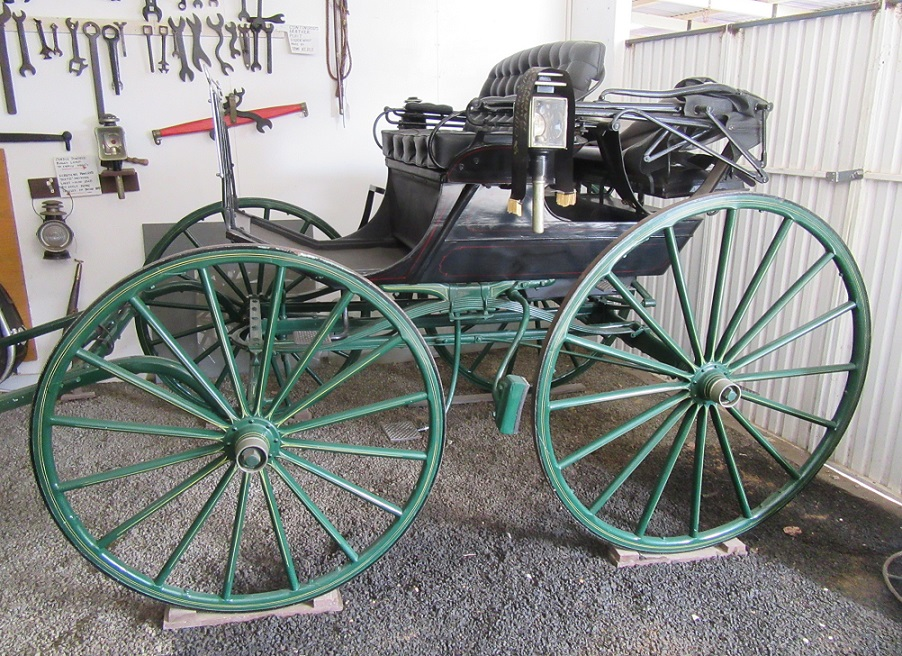
Buggy

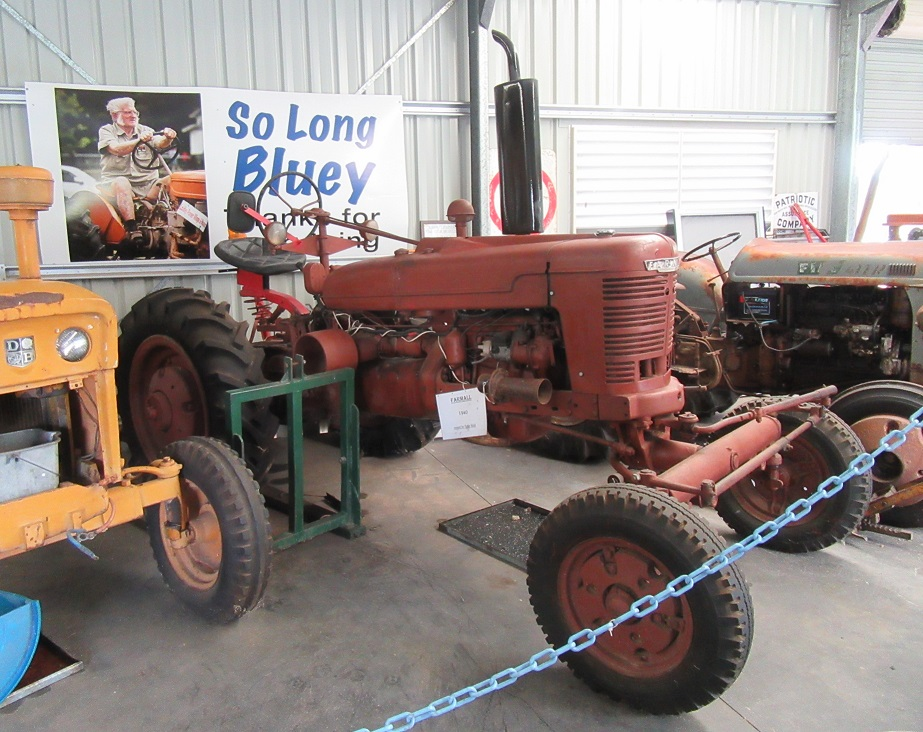
Tractor

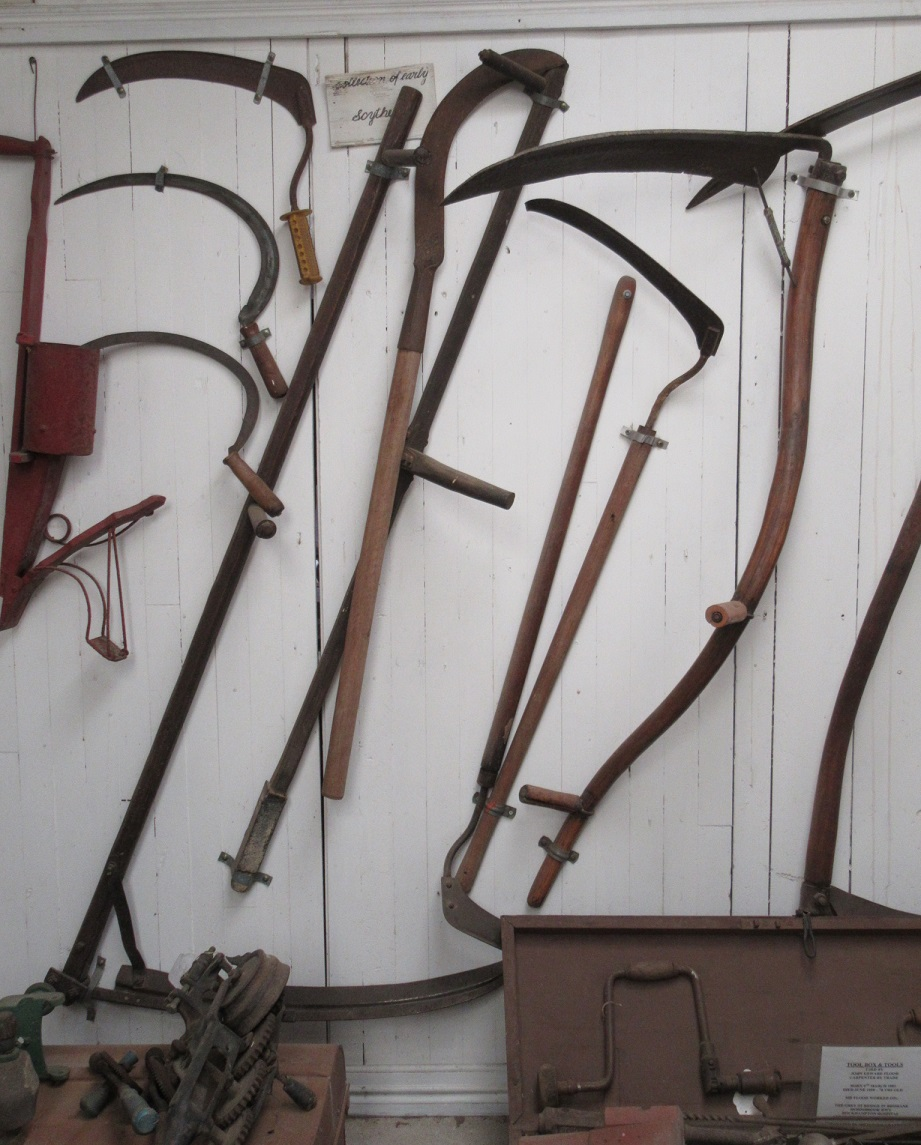
Farm hand tools

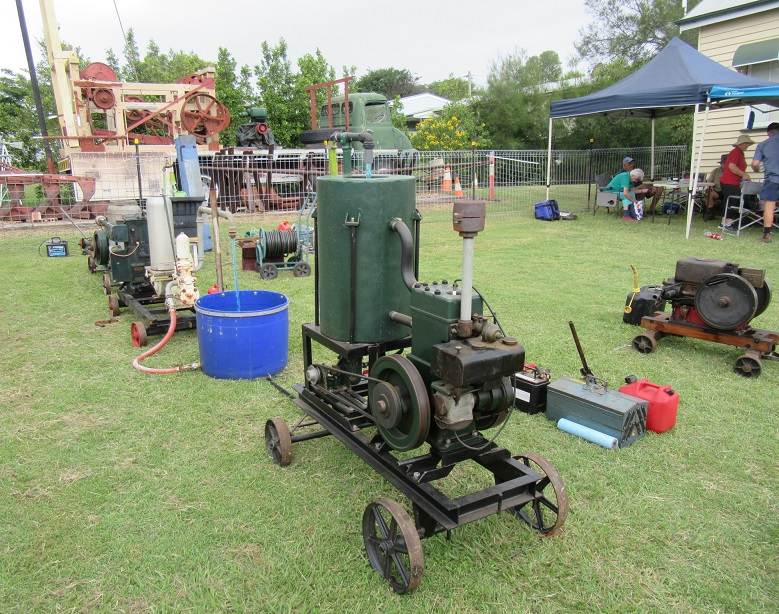
Engine display

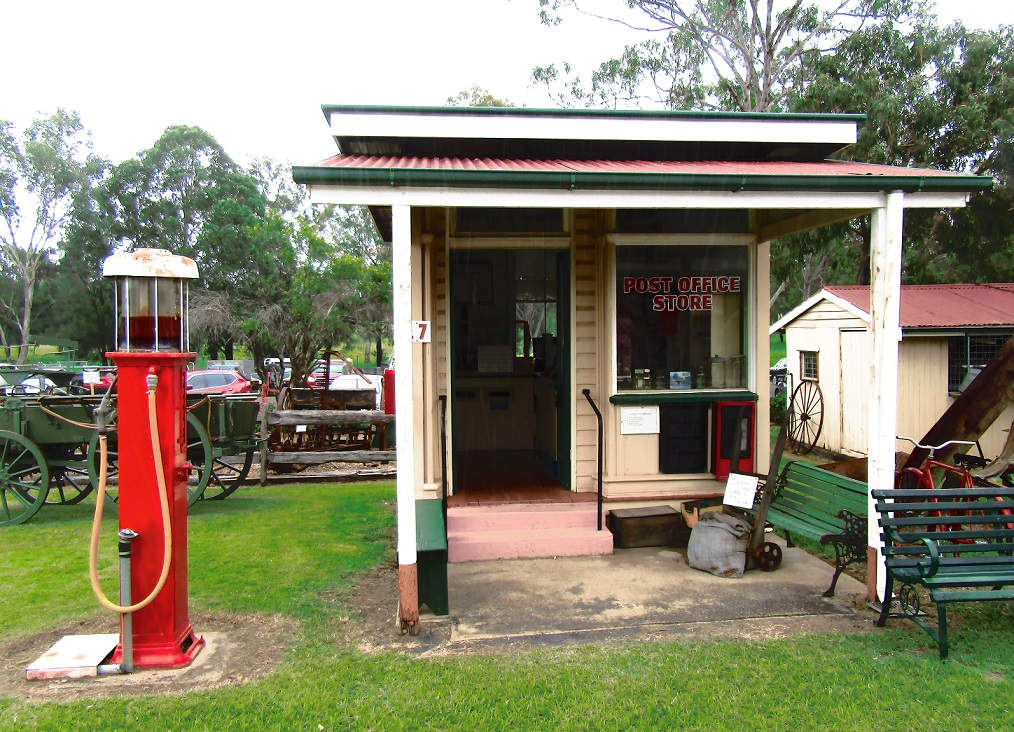
Post office and general store

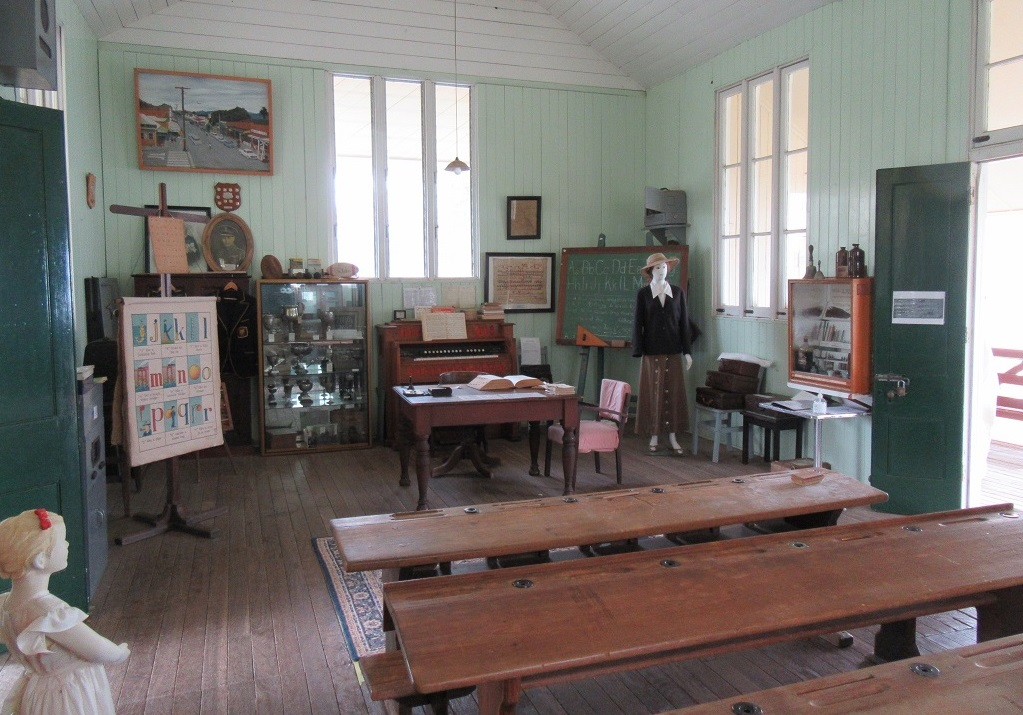
School

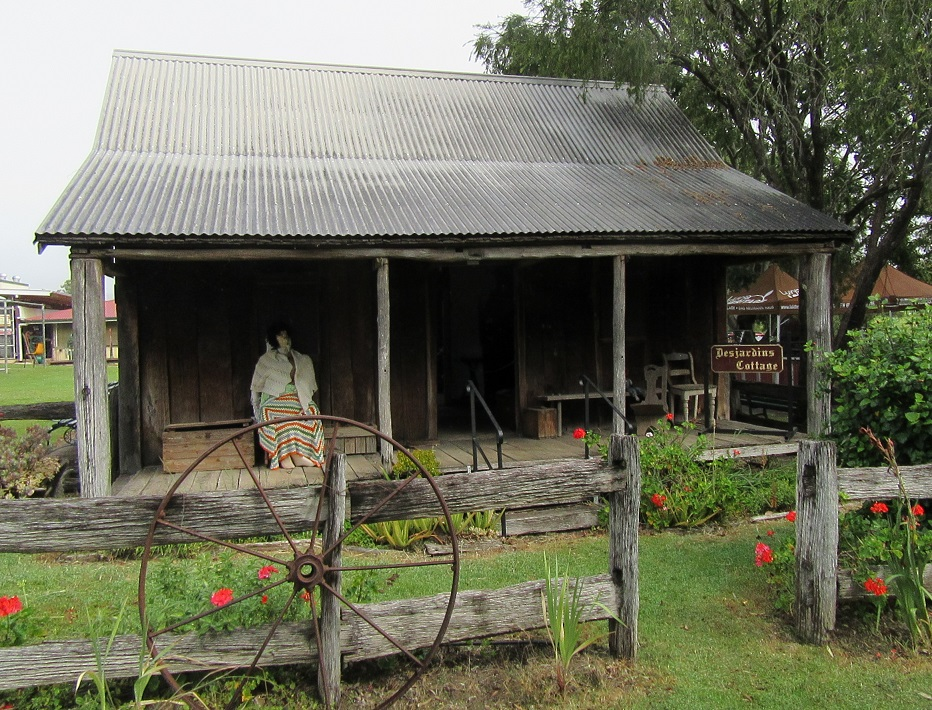
DesJardins cottage

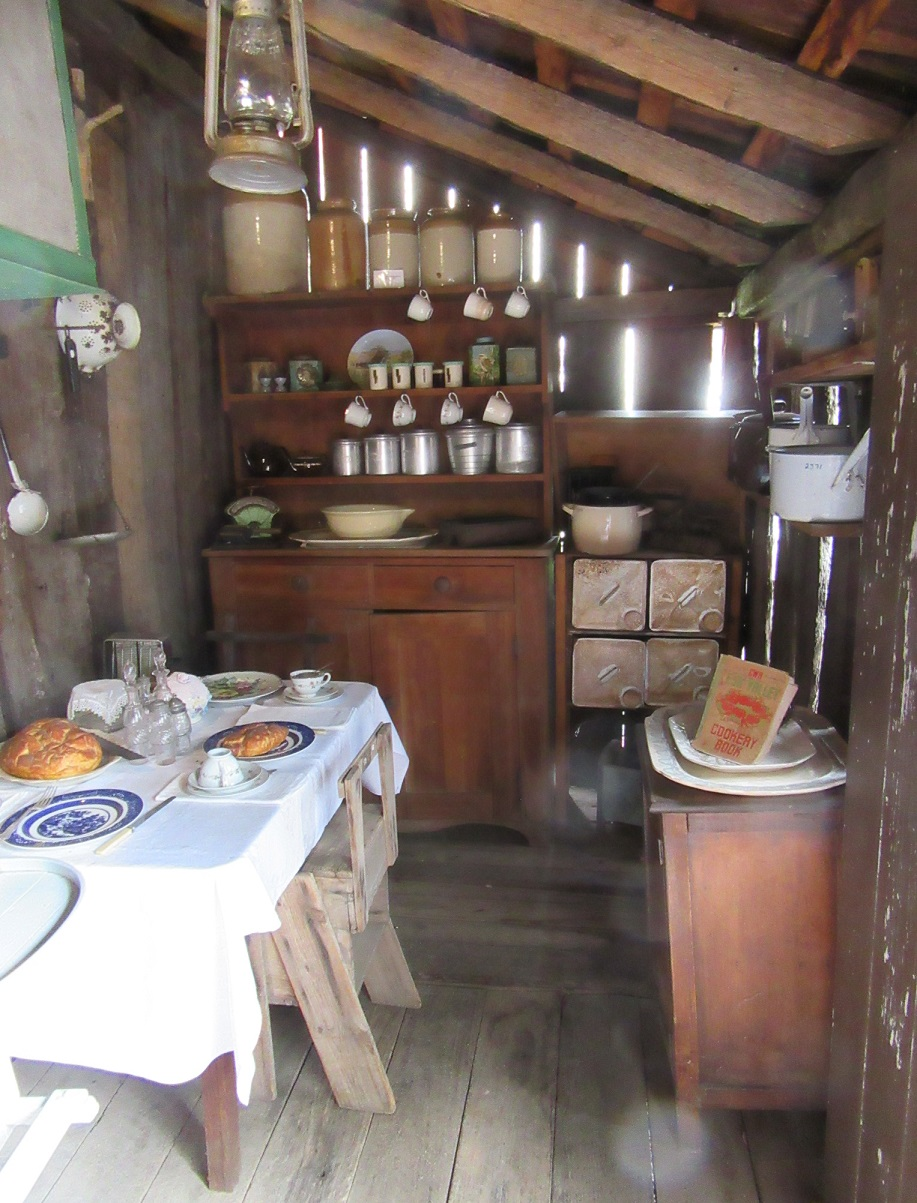
Inside DesJardins cottage

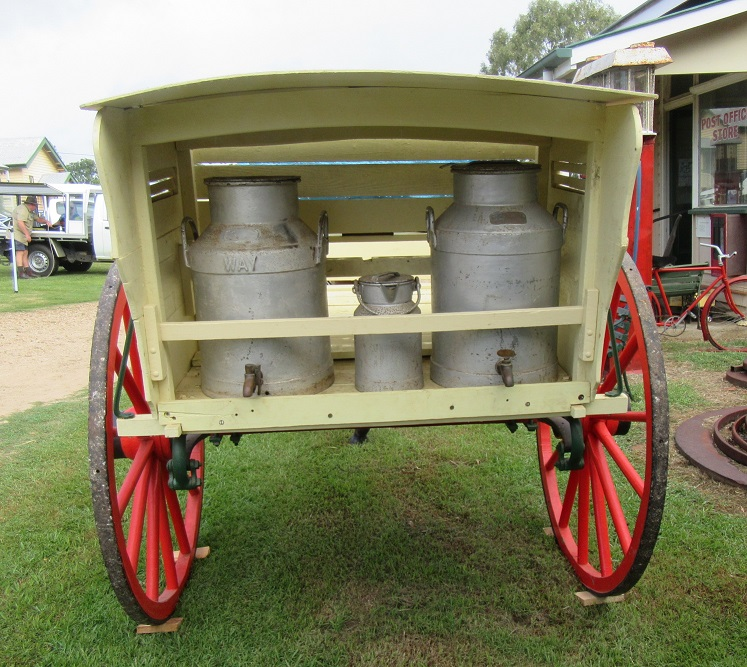
Milk cart

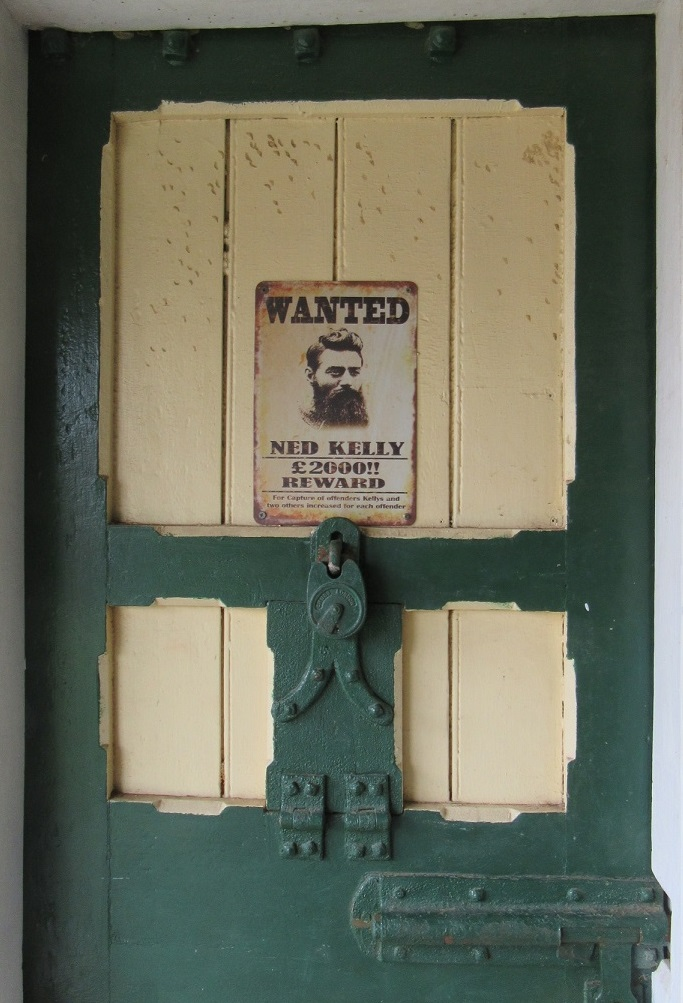
Old police cell door

== See also ==
- List of museums in Queensland
