= Corduroy Road Remains =

Archaeological site at Toowoomba-Ipswich Road, Laidley, Queensland, Australia

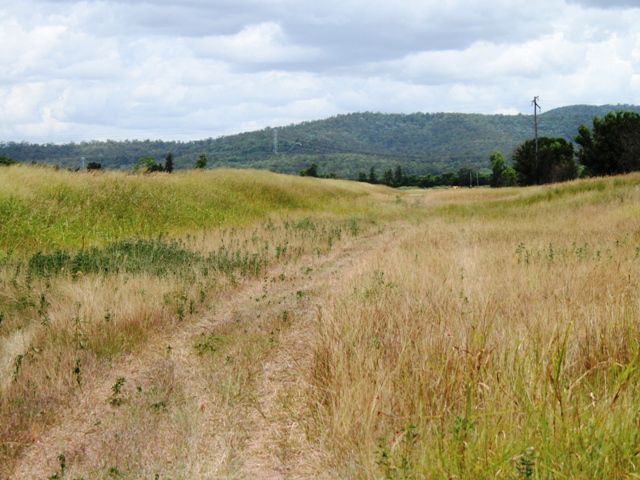
- Corduroy Road Remains, Laidley, 2009

- Location within Queensland Location within Australia
- 27.6466°S 152.3773°E
- Location: Toowoomba-Ipswich Road, Laidley, Lockyer Valley Region, Queensland, Australia

Queensland Heritage Register
- Official name: Corduroy Road Remains, Laidley
- Type: state heritage (archaeological)
- Designated: 21 October 1992
- Reference no.: 600657
- Significant period: 1850s, 1860s (fabric)

Corduroy Road Remains is a heritage-listed archaeological site at Toowoomba-Ipswich Road, Laidley, Lockyer Valley Region, Queensland, Australia. The site contains the remnants of the former main dray road between Ipswich and Drayton, which had been upgraded from a track to a corduroy (sand-covered log) road between the 1850s and 1860s, using grey ironbark logs (Eucalyptus drepanophylla).

The road improved access to the Darling Downs, and was one of a number of works during that era aimed at creating a more trafficable route to the area. However, complaints about poor road conditions continued until the roads were sealed decades later. The remnants are buried below 100–200 millimetres (3.9–7.9 in) of soil, which has limited attempts to assess the condition or surviving length of the road. In the 1970s, the former Shire of Laidley proposed having the road surveyed and researched with a view to exposing a small section for public viewing; however, no action was taken. The site was added to the Queensland Heritage Register on 21 October 1992.

== History ==
In the 19th century, the road between Ipswich and Drayton was one of the main roads of the Moreton Bay district. It was established in the 1840s as a bridle track between head stations, but soon became the principal route for wool drays and supplies, and by 1852 was listed by the New South Wales government as the only first-class road in the Moreton Bay area. Just four years earlier, however, it was described as being in a "wretched condition' and by 1859 very little had changed with the Darling Downs Gazette pointing out that "the road of Christian in Bunyan's Pilgrim's Progress was a bowling green" in comparison to the Ipswich to Drayton route. This was not a unique circumstance, with Queensland road networks in general described as "always bad and often impassable" in the Statistical Register of 1860. With a constant lack of money and a decentralized system of road administration it would be some time before conditions improved. Road construction was expensive and labour-intensive with no local authority to pay for or facilitate road building.

As settlement spread, the development and maintenance of roads became essential for a burgeoning rural economy. During the 1850s efforts were made to improve the passage to the Darling Downs. At Laidley Creek the banks were graded and a low wooden bridge was erected in 1850 at the instigation of the Downs squatters. The following year, the Colonial government spent £300 in the Moreton Bay district, including £170 on road improvements on the Darling Downs route. In 1854, Phillip D. Vigors was appointed by the New South Wales government as Surveyor of Moreton Bay Roads and instructed to oversee the construction of a trafficable road from Brisbane through Ipswich to Drayton. The work was painstakingly slow and when Vigors resigned in 1856 he reported 'there is abundant work for the next year at least for two surveyors to do nothing but survey and mark the roads in the district". More money was injected into road development in the Laidley area in May 1857 when the Brisbane Board of Works allocated £500 to build a bridge over Laidley Creek – a project completed 6 years later. It seems most likely that it was during this period of development in the 1850s and 1860s that the corduroy road was constructed.

The practice of building corduroy roads was common in Europe by the 18th century and was also a common form of construction in America during the post-colonial period. It involved overlapping full or half rounds of logs together transversely and was used in swampy areas as a cheap and simple method of stabilizing road foundations. With the scarcity of labour and financial resources in colonial Queensland, corduroy roads became an important and viable means of dealing with poor road conditions. Moreover, their simple method of construction meant that the employment of an engineer was not required as was the case with the more advanced and more expensive practice of building plank roads, as delineated in 1852 by Captain Payne, a former Royal Engineer, and as tabled in the New South Wales Legislative Council the following year.

In the Laidley region, bad road conditions remained a continuing problem until surfaced roads were laid. In 1893 a report in The Queensland Times outlined the frustration of Laidley farmers who "were prevented from conveying [their crops] ... to market on account of the heavy and boggy nature of the roads, caused by the excessive rainfalls". As early as 1859 the area where the remains of the corduroy road are located was described by a surveyor as "lightly inundated" owing to its flatness. With a plentiful supply of gum and ironbark nearby, it was an ideal and necessary location for a corduroy road.

While corduroy roads were an effective means of traversing a quagmire, they were far from perfect. With rudimentary suspension systems in coaches of the day, travellers found corduroy sections to be far from comfortable. They were also subject to the kind of disrepair that made travel more precarious, as Nehemiah Bartley noted in his reminiscences of his business trips of 1854–55 to the Darling Downs in Opals and Agates: "The next day I had to tackle the scrub on the 'Spicer's Peak' Gap. This road ... had been at one time paved with thick pine logs – a 'corduroy' road, in fact – and, while it lasted, all was well. But, the place was naturally almost a bottomless morass, full of springs; the logs had rotted in the middle, and the sound ends titled up in all directions; a lovely chevaux de frise. It was an awful place for horse, bullock, or vehicle of any kind, to face, the tilted logs adding to the pitfalls of the boggy ground".

While the corduroy road at Laidley remains unexposed it is not possible to determine the condition in which it now exists. A proposal to have the road surveyed and researched with a view to exposing a small section for public viewing was discussed by the Laidley Shire Council in the 1970s, but to date no further action has been taken.

== Description ==
The corduroy road remnants are located on the Old Toowoomba Road between Head Road and Mulgowie Road, 1 kilometre (0.62 mi) southwest of Laidley. While the exact extent of the corduroy road cannot be determined, it is possible that it originally extended across current freehold properties adjacent to the Old Toowoomba Road.

Corduroy roads in general were constructed by overlapping full or half rounds of logs transversely and commonly used in swampy areas to stabilize road foundations. Gravel was sometimes used to seal the surface and due to the surrounding conditions corduroy roads were often covered by mud. The corduroy road at Laidley remains buried below 100–200 millimetres (3.9–7.9 in) of soil, making an assessment of its current physical condition impossible. In 1976, a section of wood from this road was forwarded to the Department of Forestry for investigation. It was revealed that the logs used were grey ironbark (Eucalyptus drepanophylla), a species in plentiful supply nearby, and that some deterioration of the wood had occurred owing to wet rot and termite attack.

== Heritage listing ==
The Corduroy Road remains at Laidley was listed on the Queensland Heritage Register on 21 October 1992 having satisfied the following criteria.

The place is important in demonstrating the evolution or pattern of Queensland's history.

The place is important in demonstrating the evolution or pattern of Queensland's history insofar as it provides evidence of the earliest development of road networks in the Moreton Bay district during the 19th century and the means used by early settlers to cope with the poor condition of roads during this period. With the growth of the Darling Downs from the 1850s onwards there was a necessity to improve communication between communities and market access for farmers. The corduroy road is an example of the practical and inexpensive method employed to ameliorate road conditions in a period when funding for road improvements in the northern districts of New South Wales was limited to occasional government votes.

The place demonstrates rare, uncommon or endangered aspects of Queensland's cultural heritage.

The corduroy road demonstrates rare, uncommon or endangered aspects of Queensland's cultural heritage and is important in demonstrating the principal characteristics of a particular class of cultural places, being a representative example of a once common technique of road building which did not require specific engineering skills and was readily employed by local farmers and residents to overcome difficult conditions along supply and communication routes.

The place is important in demonstrating the principal characteristics of a particular class of cultural places.

The corduroy road demonstrates rare, uncommon or endangered aspects of Queensland's cultural heritage and is important in demonstrating the principal characteristics of a particular class of cultural places, being a representative example of a once common technique of road building which did not require specific engineering skills and was readily employed by local farmers and residents to overcome difficult conditions along supply and communication routes.
