= Das Neumann Haus Museum (Laidley, Queensland) =

Das Neumann Haus Museum in Laidley Queensland Australia

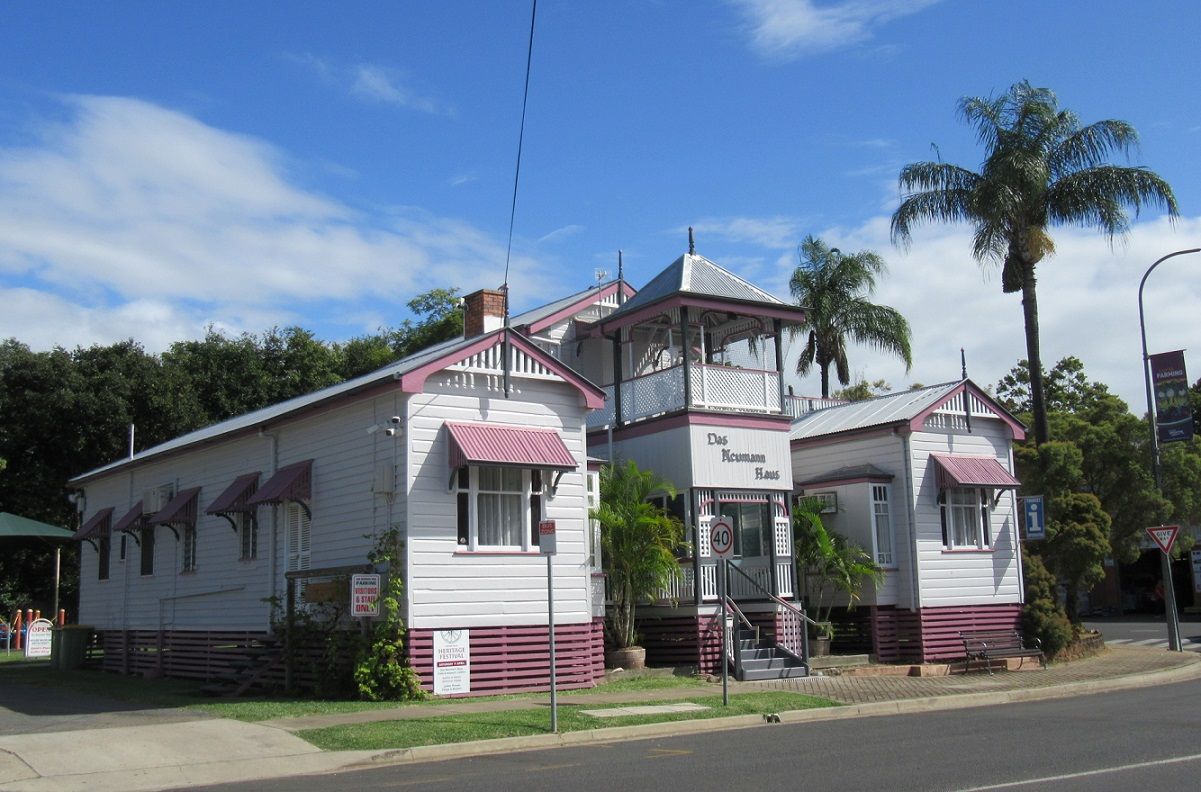
- Das Neumann Haus Museum
- Established: 1998
- Location: Australia, 100 Patrick Street, Laidley, Lockyer Valley Area, Queensland 4341
- Coordinates: 27°37′53″S 152°23′39″E
- Type: historic house museum
- Owner: Lockyer Valley Regional Council
- Public transit access: Friday to Sunday; 10 am to 2.30pm Phone: (07) 5465 3241
- Website: https://www.luvyalockyer.com.au

Das Neumann Haus Museum is an historic house museum located in the town of Laidley, Queensland, Australia, on the corner of Patrick Street and William Street.

The house, a colonial style weatherboard building, was built by German immigrant Hermann Neumann in 1893 as his private residence. The house has been restored to its former condition and refurnished in the style of the 1930s. It opened in 1998 to the public as a house museum. A visitor information centre, a café and a gift shop are also operated within the building.

== History ==
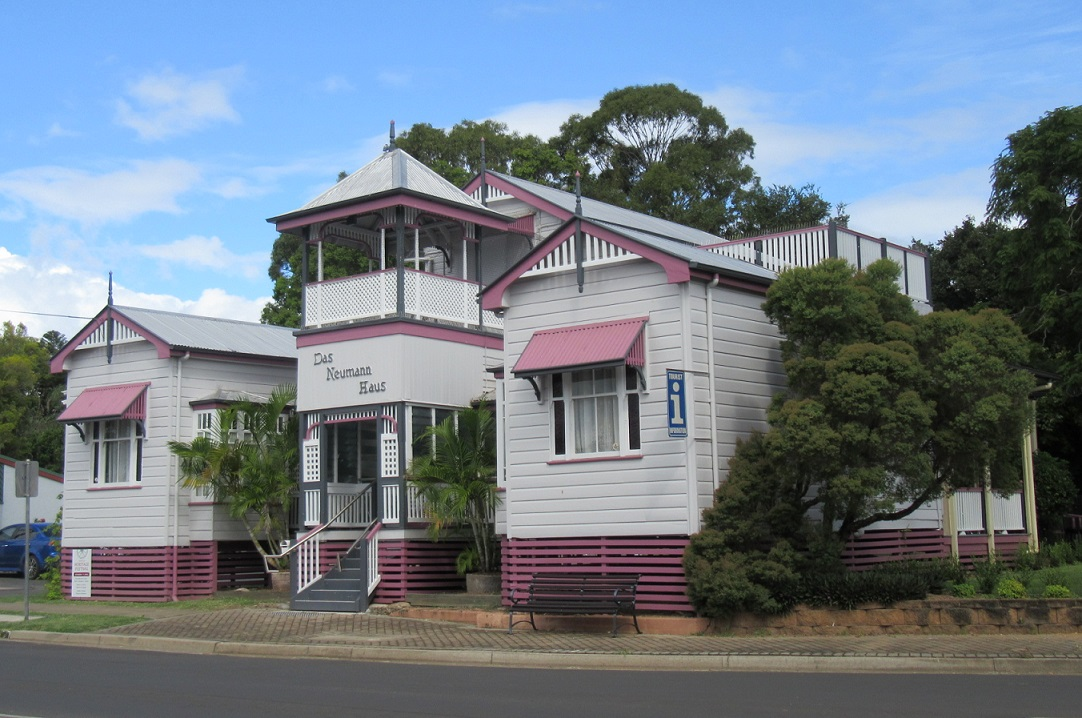
Das Neumann Haus Museum, view from William Street, April 2022

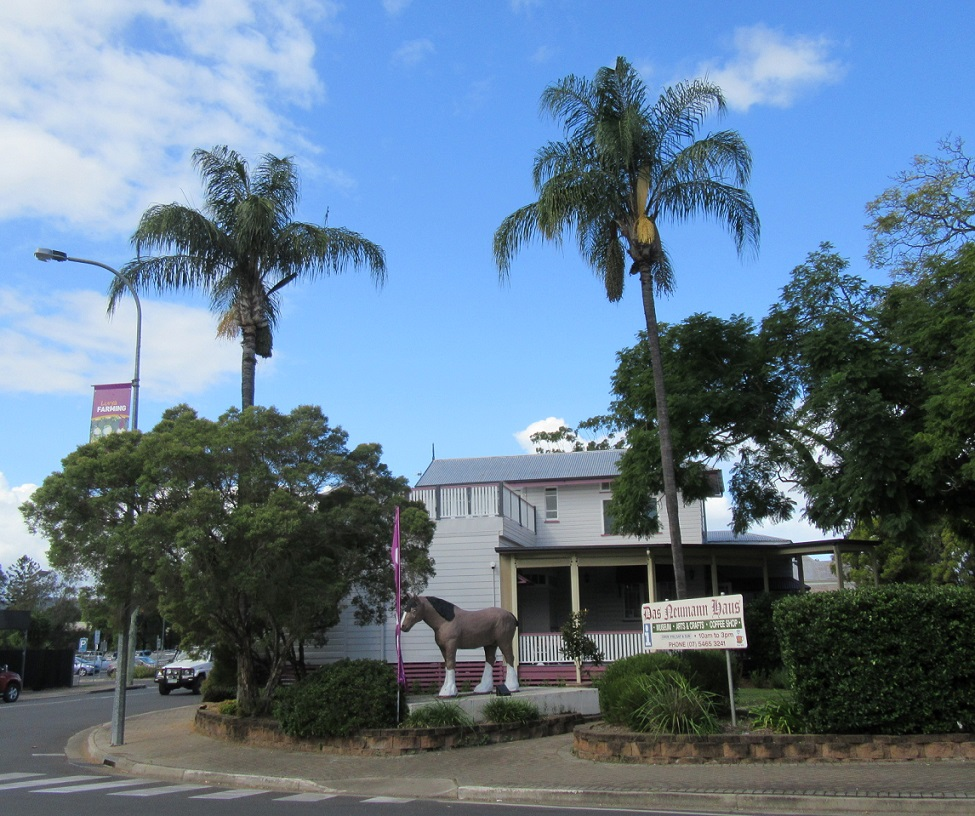
Das Neumann Haus Museum, view from Patrick Street, April 2022

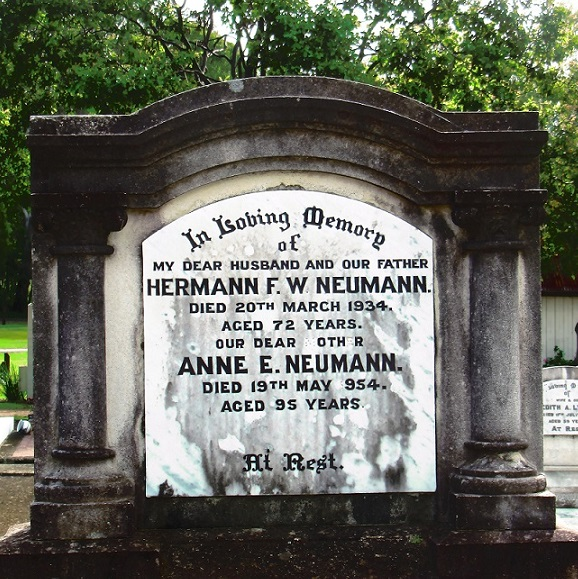
Neumann headstone Laidley Cemetery 2022

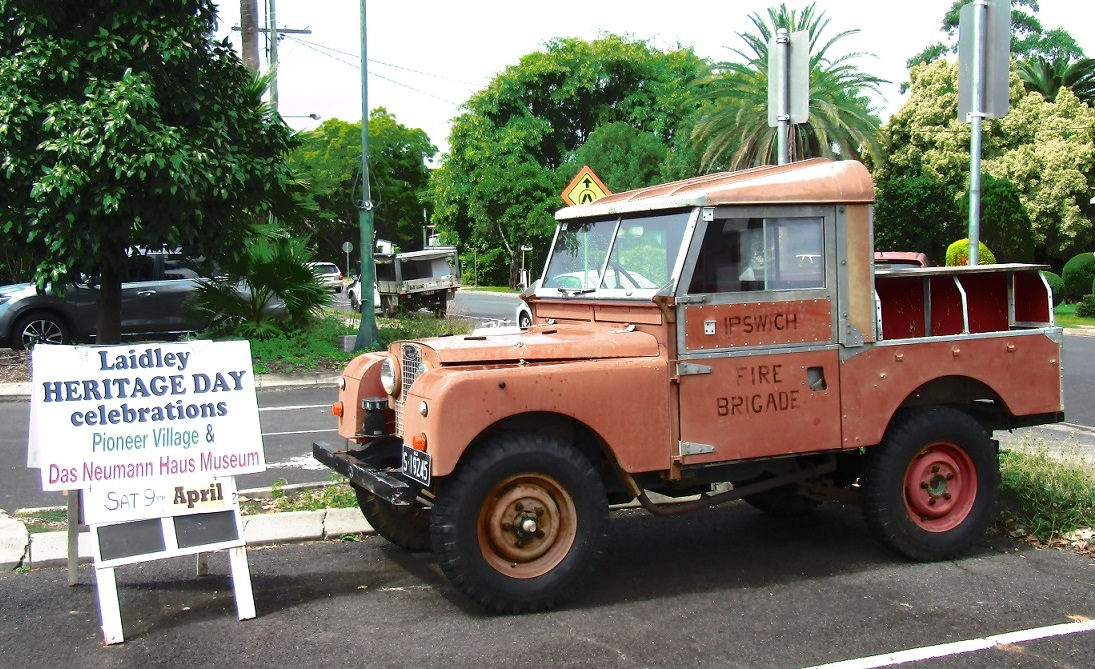
Lockyer Valley Heritage Festival April 2022

Hermann Friedrich Wilhelm Neumann was born in 1861 in Herrenstein near Gerswalde, Uckermark, Eastern Prussia (now Germany), to parents Carl Neumann and Caroline Neumann (née Wilhelm).

In 1884, Hermann Neumann migrated to Australia with his parents and two brothers. He and his brother Carl established a furniture business in Brisbane Street, Ipswich, Queensland.

Annie Elizabeth Neumann (née Schermuly), born on April 8, 1859, in London, was the well-educated daughter of Eliza Schermuly (née Cross), an English aristocratic woman, and Conrad Schermuly, a German musician. She left England to visit relatives in Ipswich, traveling as an interpreter on the ship.

On December 12, 1885, Hermann married Annie in Ipswich - she had been instructing him in the English language.

In 1893, Hermann, Annie and their three sons moved to Laidley where Hermann expanded the family furniture business.

The Laidley region was once the home of the "Kitabul People" before the arrival of Europeans in the early 19th century. Today, the Jagera people are the traditional owners of the Lockyer Valley region.

When Hermann Neumann started to build the family residence, showroom and two-storey workshop, the main emphasis initially was on the business, so the house was developed over the following years.

The furniture manufacturing business was at the rear of the house and a showroom located out the front. The showroom was accessible through folding french doors - open during the day, so Annie could keep an eye on the shop whilst tending to the needs of her five children (two daughters were born after moving to Laidley), and closed at night for privacy. In the workshop Hermann built furniture for private households as well as for churches, for example the local St Saviours Anglican Church, where such furniture can still be found today. As a hobby he also built grandfather clocks and violins.

The family was involved in musical and other cultural pursuits, and local children were taught violin and piano by family members. Violins made by Hermann Neumann are still owned privately. On special occasions, the family provided musical entertainment on their balcony for the benefit of the community. One of the sons, Alfred, had a club - the "Keep on Aiming Higher Club" - where young men gathered to play instruments and talk about literature.

In around 1905, Annie asked for additions to the house, and Hermann added a second storey, which included a music room, sunroom and balconies. Annie would entertain her friends with music and tea on the “Tiffin” balcony, tiffin being afternoon tea in aristocrat circles.

The house is situated in the heart of the township of Laidley, which in the early part of the 20th century was considered the cultural hub of the community. Settlers, coming into Laidley to do their shopping or bring their produce and wares to market, often called into the Neumann's for a tea or coffee, a sample of Annie's cooking and a chat.

On March 20, 1934, Hermann Neumann died aged 72–73. Their son, Carl, and his wife carried on the business.

In 1980, the house was gifted by the family to the Laidley Shire (now incorporated in the Lockyer Valley Regional Council). Council had the adjoining showroom demolished and purposed the house for office space and meeting rooms. The manufacturing building made way to gardens.

In 1998, the house was restored and opened to the public as a museum and coffee house. The café was called Annie's Place in remembrance of Annie Neumann's hospitality. The museum is run by the volunteers of Friends of Das Neumann Haus.

== Display ==
The museum documents family and social history. Family treasures were donated to the museum by the family who also assisted with the cost of furniture restoration. Furniture, photos and other items, relevant to either the Neumann family or the lifestyle of the community at the time, were donated by the community. The museum portrays the lifestyle, hobbies and business interests of the family during the 1930s.

A Stradivarius-style violin, built by Hermann Neumann, is on display.

Next to the museum, on Patrick St, stands a statue of a Clydesdale horse, reminding of the times when Clydesdales were essential to the economic prosperity of the district. The museum takes part and hosts events in the annual Lockyer Valley Heritage Festival in April and the Laidley Spring Festival in September.

== Gallery ==
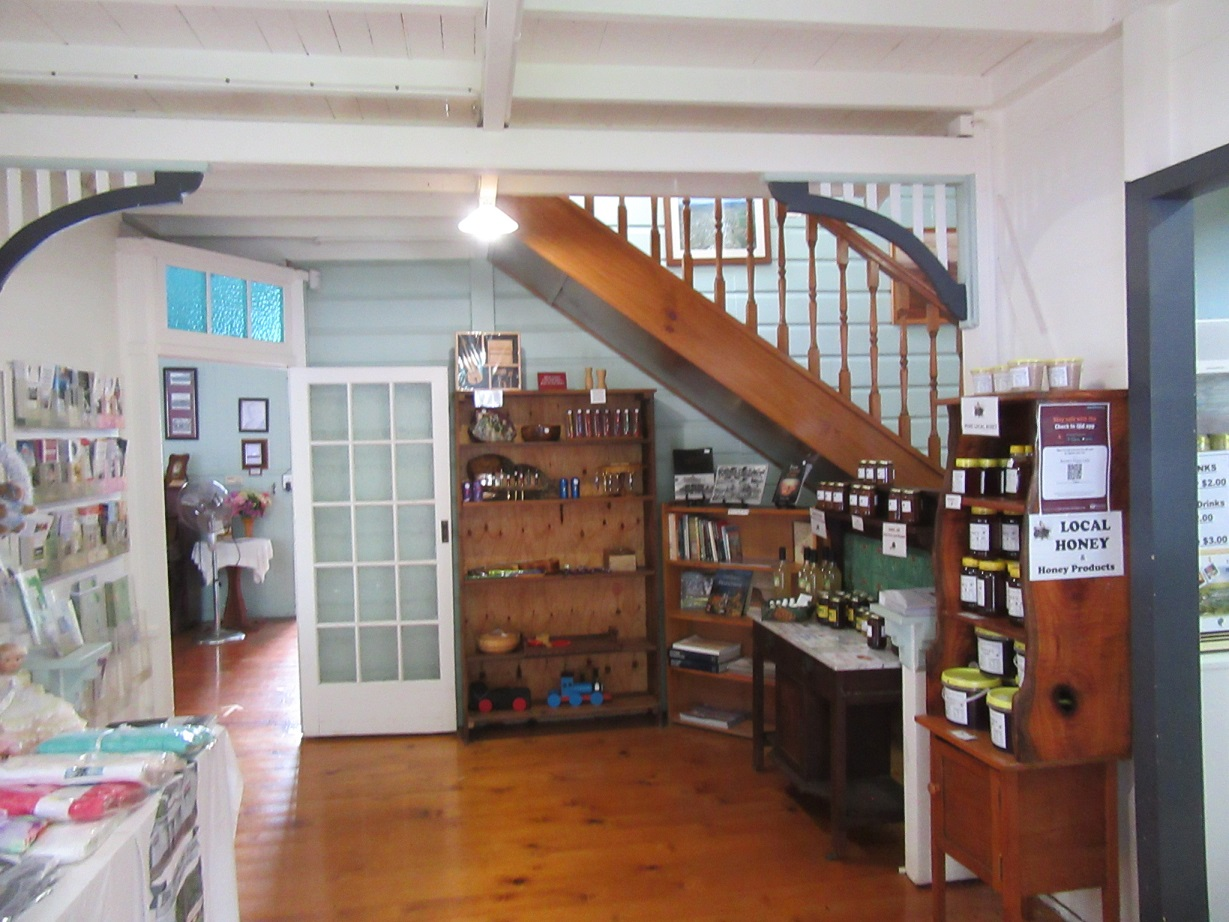
Das Neumann Haus Museum April 2022 entry hall

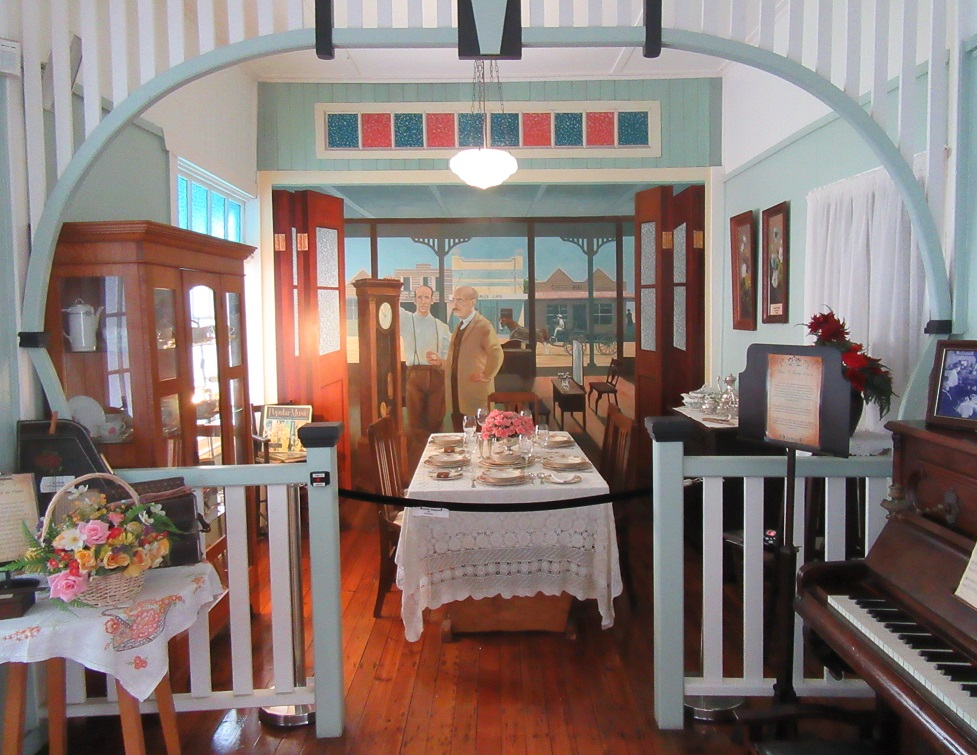
Das Neumann Haus Museum April 2022 dining room

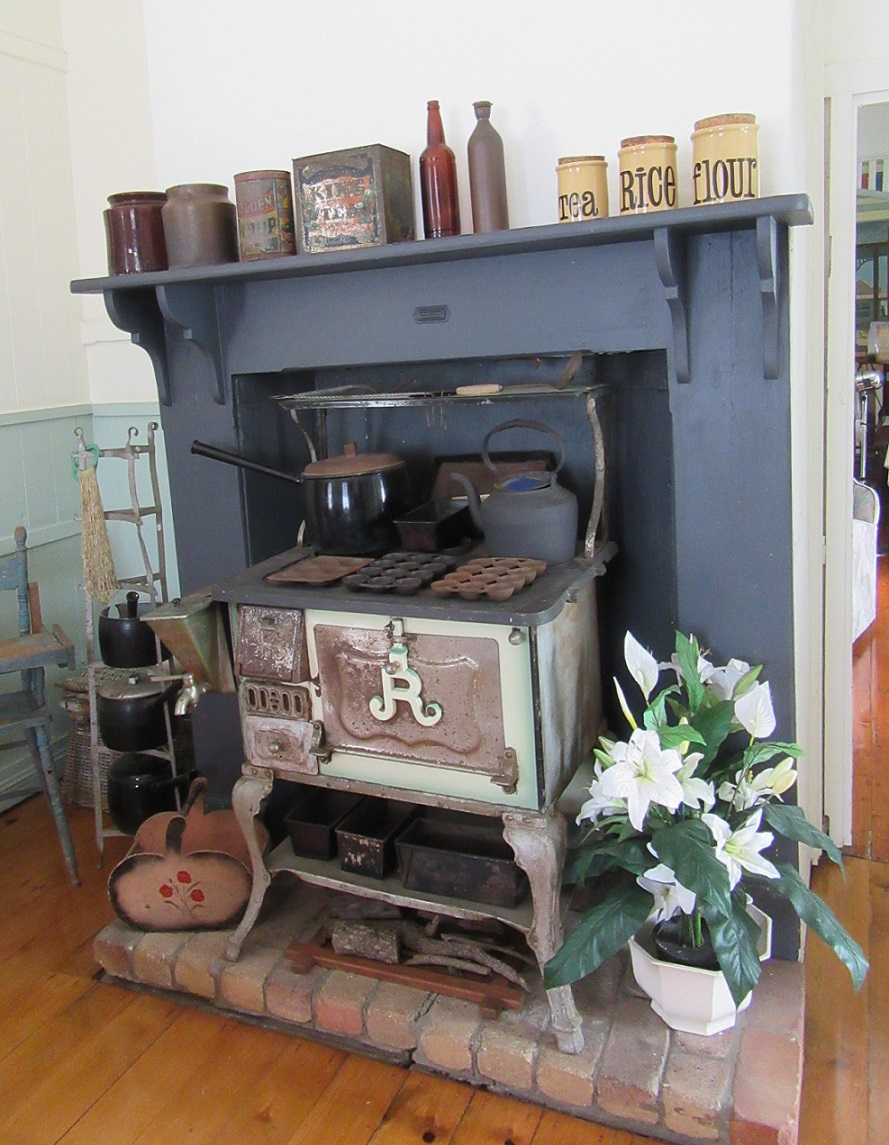
Das Neumann Haus Museum April 2022 kitchen

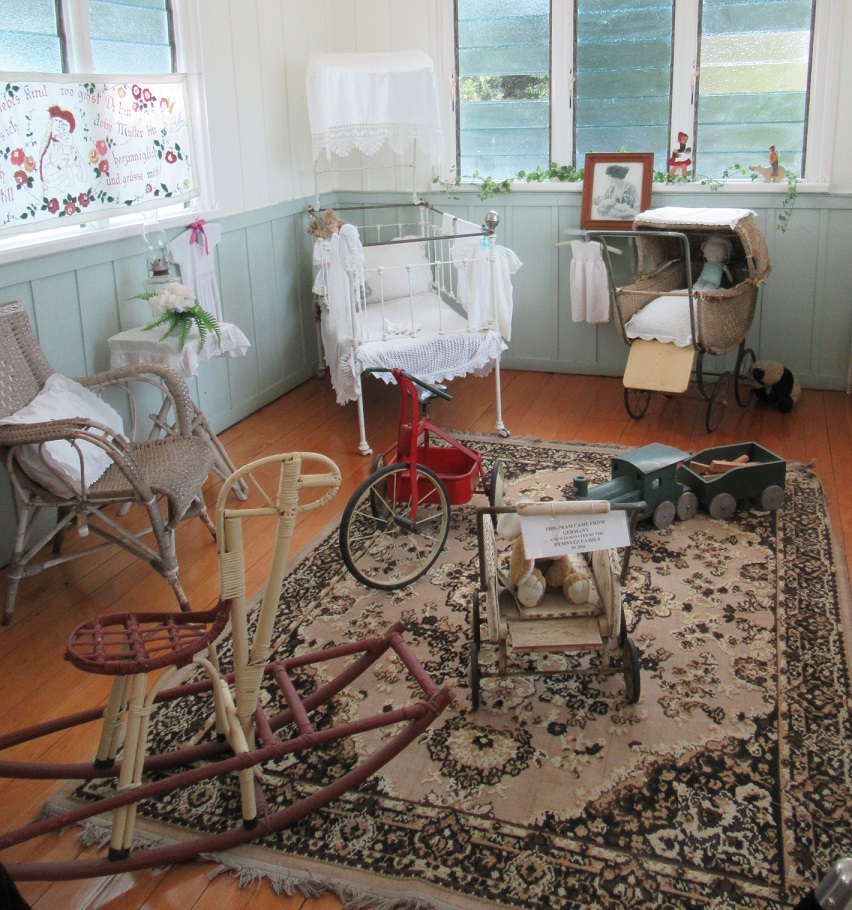
Das Neumann Haus Museum April 2022 nursery

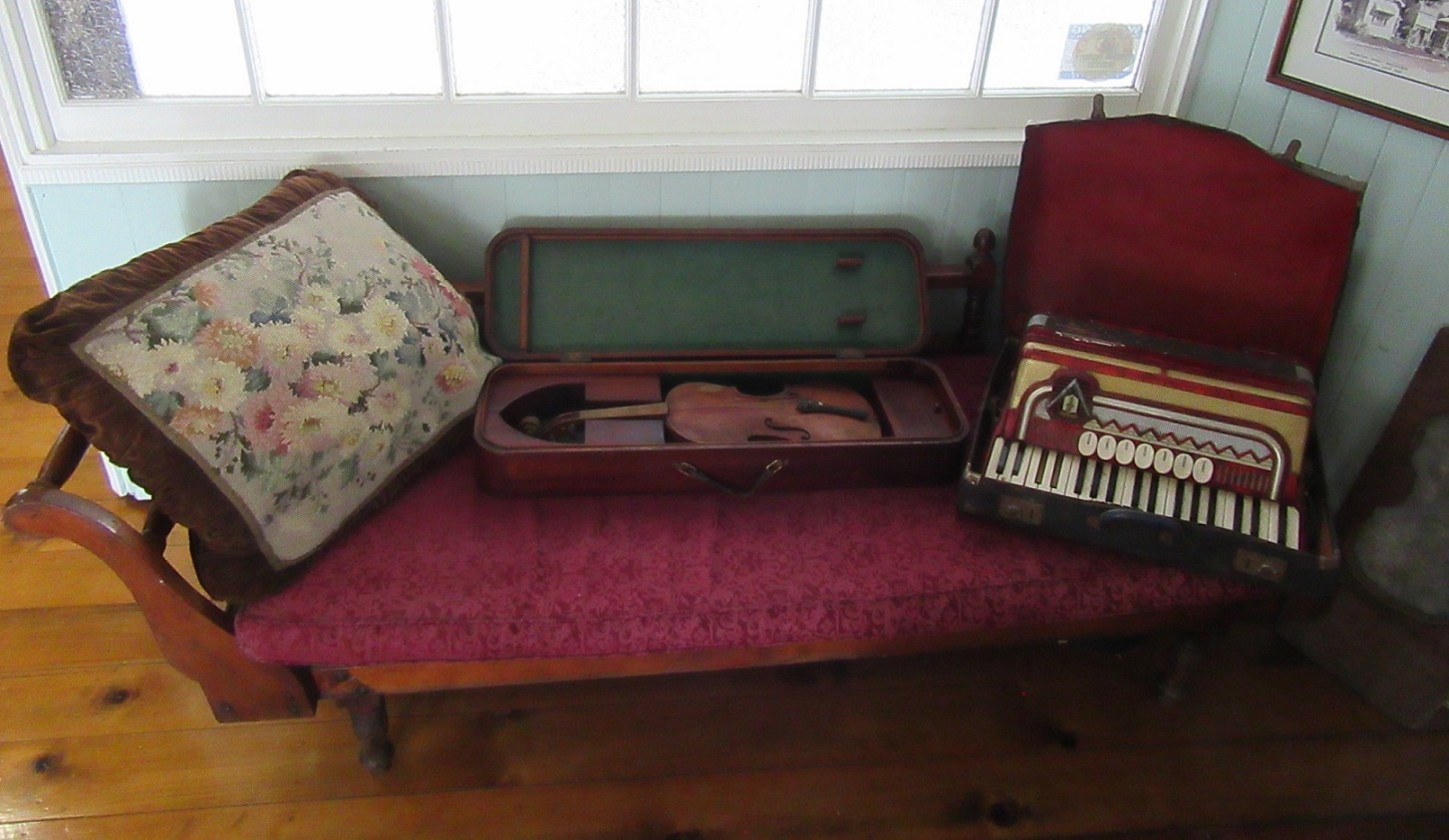
Das Neumann Haus Museum April 2022 sofa with violin and accordion

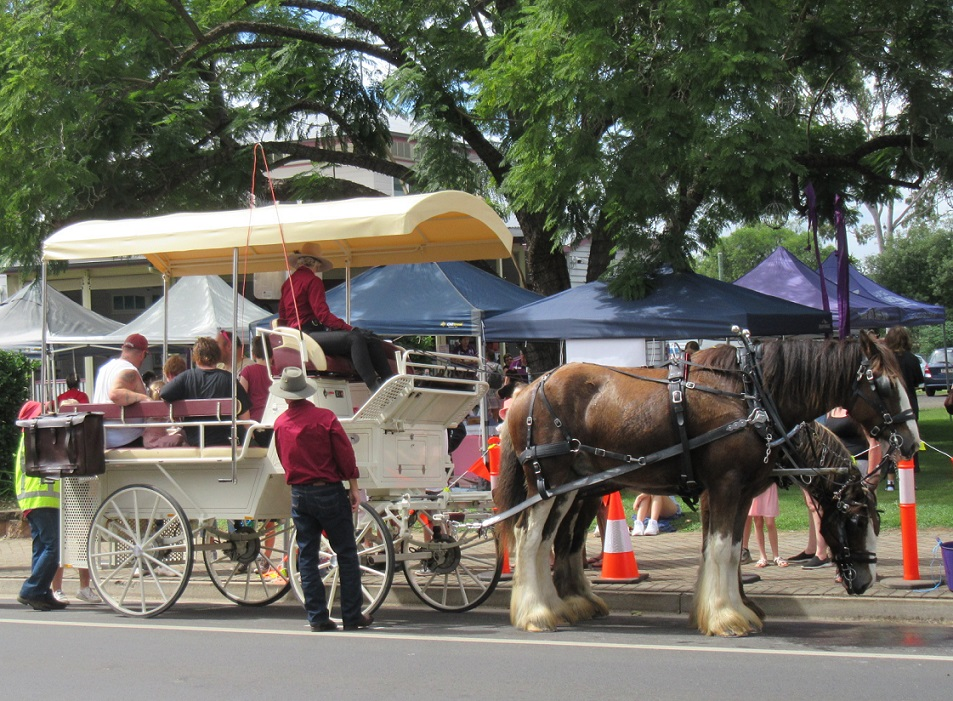
Lockyer Valley Heritage Festival 2022, horse cart before Neumann Haus

== Heritage ==
In 1989, the museum received grant funding of $20,000 through the National Estate Grants Program 1988–1989 for conservation efforts through local government.

In 2001, the Laidley Shire Council placed Das Neumann Haus on the list of Places of High Potential Cultural Heritage Significance. The museum was also listed in the Register of the National Estate as an indicative-historic place, ID 17182, and in the EPA Research Inventory of Historical Places (QCHIP), ID 4003.

== See also ==
List of museums in Queensland
