= Laidley, Queensland =

Laidley
- Town
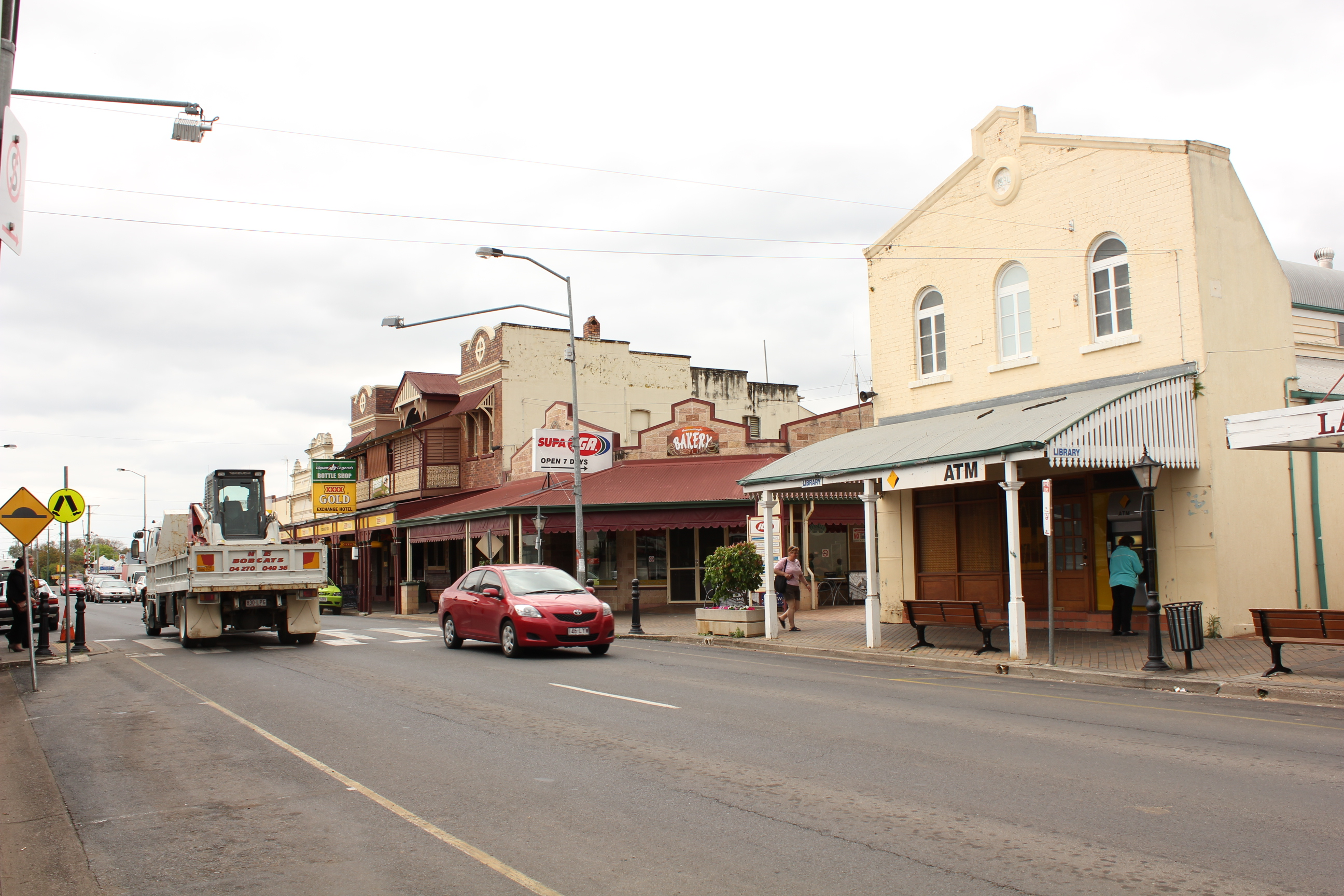
- Main Street of Laidley, 2011

- Interactive map of Laidley
- Coordinates: 27.6313°S 152.3938°E
- Country: Australia
- State: Queensland
- LGA: Lockyer Valley Region
- Location: 18.2 km (11.3 mi) SE of Gatton; 44.3 km (27.5 mi) W of Ipswich; 57.9 km (36.0 mi) ESE of Toowoomba; 84.2 km (52.3 mi) WSW of Brisbane
- Established: 1858

Government
  - State electorate: Lockyer
  - Federal division: Wright

Area
  - Total: 17.8 km^{2} (6.9 sq mi)

Population
  - Total: 3,809 (2021 census)
  - Density: 214.0/km^{2} (554.2/sq mi)
- Time zone: UTC+10:00 (AEST)
- Postcode: 4341
- County: Churchill
- Parish: Laidley
- Mean max temp: 26.9 °C (80.4 °F)
- Mean min temp: 13.1 °C (55.6 °F)
- Annual rainfall: 765.6 mm (30.14 in)
Localities around Laidley
| Laidley North | Laidley North | Summerholm |
| Laidley Heights | Laidley | Summerholm |
| Laidley South | Laidley South | Grandchester |

Laidley is a rural town and locality in the Lockyer Valley Region, Queensland, Australia. In the 2021 census, the locality of Laidley had a population of 3,809 people.

== Geography ==
Laidley is situated within the Lockyer Valley of South East Queensland east of the Great Dividing Range and close to the northern foothills of the Main Range. The town is located 84.2 kilometres (52.3 mi) west of Brisbane, the state capital, and 57 kilometres (35 mi) east of Toowoomba. The Warrego Highway (A2) is around 10 kilometres (6.2 mi) to the north, and the town sits on the Brisbane–Charleville railway line. Laidley–Plainland Road exits to the north.

Laidley lies within the Lockyer Creek catchment, with the creek rising at the eastern slopes of the Great Dividing Range and flowing east. The catchment has an area of approximately 3,000 square kilometres (1,200 sq mi) and elevations range from 1,100m AHD on the Great Dividing Range to 24m AHD at the confluence with the Brisbane River.

The relatively flat topography of the valley, its rich alluvial soils and warm climate are the basis for the Lockyer Valley to have become a major supplier of vegetables, horticulture and grains. The local industry has been dominated by agriculture since the end of the 19th century, producing 35% of Queensland's vegetable supply, and Laidley has long regarded itself as "Queensland's Country Garden". Fruit and vegetable production features prominently, the most commonly grown vegetable crops being carrots, potatoes, the brassica vegetables (e.g. cabbage, broccoli, cauliflower), pumpkins, corns and beans. Much of the beetroot grown in Australia comes from the Laidley district.

== History ==
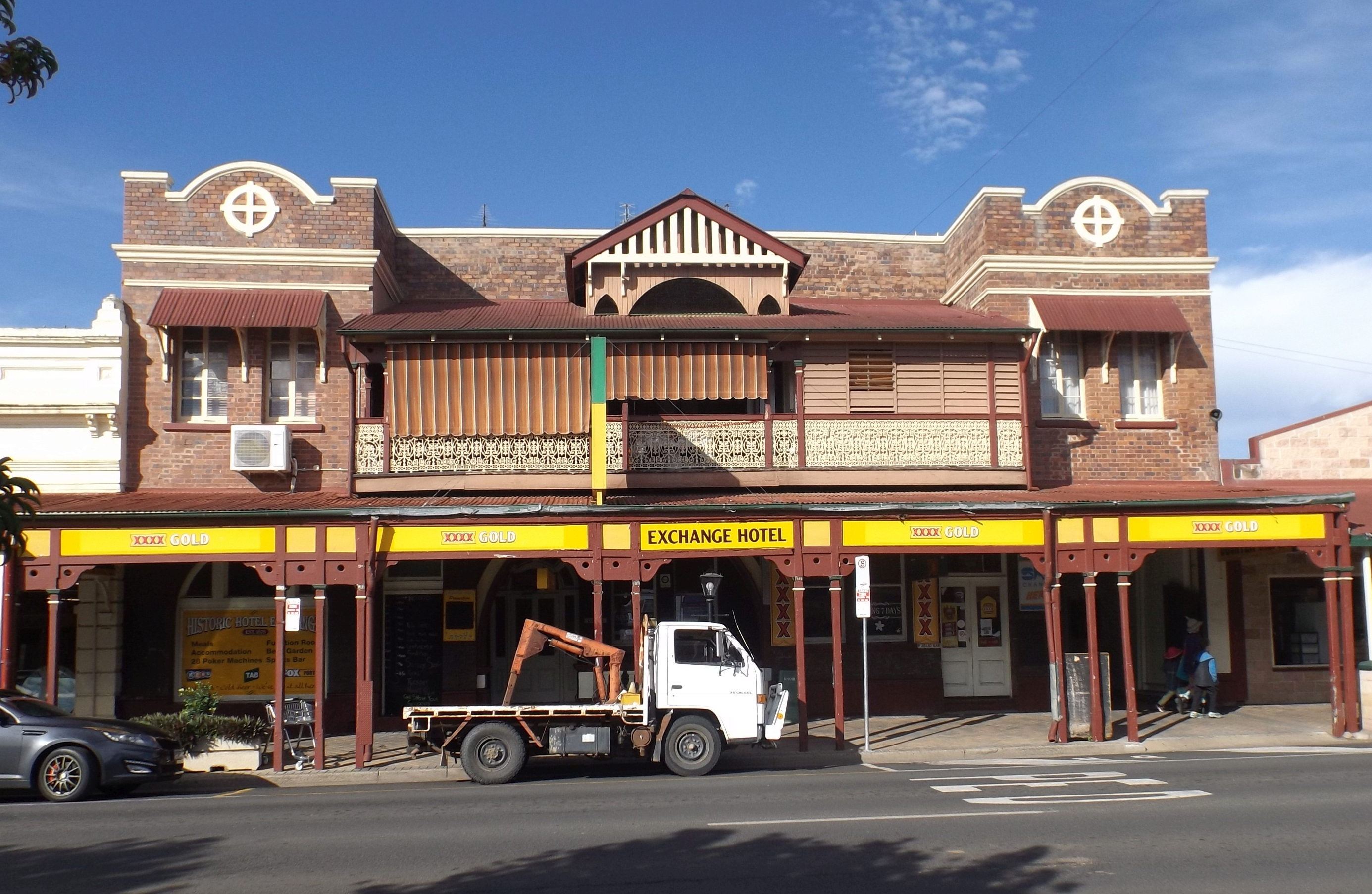
Exchange Hotel, Laidley, 2015

The Laidley region was once home to the "Kitabul People" before the arrival of Europeans in the early 19th century. Today, the Ugarapul People are the traditional owners of the Lockyer Valley region.

In 1829, Allan Cunningham explored the area and named it Laidley Plains on 22 June 1829, after James Laidley, the Deputy Commissary General of the colony of New South Wales.

The town developed around a wagon stop on the main road route between Ipswich and Toowoomba. A stop was needed after the climb over the small Little Liverpool Range west of Marburg.

By the 1850s, the area was being cleared for sheep grazing. A survey for the growing village was conducted in 1858.

Laidley Post Office opened on 1 February 1861. Laidley Creek West Receiving Office operated from 1899 to 1927, Laidley Creek West Post Office was open from 1927 to 1953, and a telephone office from 1953 to 1956. Laidley Rail Post Office opened in 1915 and closed in 1925. A Travelling Post Office service ran on the Main Line between Brisbane and Toowoomba between 1877 and 1932.

Since 1863, police officers have been stationed in Laidley. The first two police officers who served at Laidley are believed to have been Acting Sergeant William Gunn from 1863 to 1868 and Constable Thomas Raleigh from 1863 to 1865. Since 2015, the Police Station is housed in a refurbished building on Spicer Street. The building was originally the Laidley Courthouse and Public Offices, opened in 1964, housing the Courthouse, State Government offices and the Police.

The first Presbyterian service were held in Laidley in 1864 by William Lambie Nelson.

In the mid-1860s, the railway line from Grandchester stopped at a railway station 1.5 kilometres (0.93 mi) north of the town. Between 1911 and 1955, a branch railway line ran from Laidley along the Laidley Creek to the settlement at Mulgowie.

On 28 April 1886 St Saviour's Anglican church was opened in Laidley. It was designed by architect FDG Stanley. By 1888 there were a number of additions including a parsonage, a tower and a bell. In May 1909 it was announced that a new church would be built from reinforced concrete at an estimated cost of £800 and would be designed by Messers James Marks and Co, architects in Toowoomba. A call for tenders to construct the church was made in September 1909. The foundation stone was laid on 15 November 1909 by Archdeacon Arthur Rivers. The new St Saviour's Anglican church was consecrated by Archbishop St Clair Donaldson on 21 June 1910. The centenary of the church was celebrated in 2010.

Laidley Old Township Provisional School opened on 9 March 1908. On 1 January 1909, it became Laidley Central State School. The school closed on 12 December 1998, when it was replaced by Laidley District State School at a new location. It was at 21-23 Hope Street (27.6477°S 152.3929°E). The school buildings are now used as a childcare centre, while the school grounds are now Narda Cricket Oval operated by the Lockyer Valley Regional Council.

St Mary's Catholic Primary School was established by the Sisters of Mercy and was officially opened on 14 July 1912 by Archbishop James Duhig. The Sisters operated the school until 1988, when the first lay principal was appointed.

On 6 March 1915, the hospital officially opened in Laidley, known as "Lockyer General Hospital". It was moved in 1922 to its current site between Spicer Street and William Street where it reopened on 23 June 1923. Old meeting minutes tell that a committee had started talks for a local hospital in 1898. An official book of minutes had been kept since June 1912. In 2001, certain parts of the building complex were listed by Council in the EPA's Research Inventory of Historical Places (QCHIP).

In 1930, the Redeemer Lutheran Church was established at 7 MacGregor Street. In 1938, the Lutheran church at Blenheim was relocated to Laidley to be the Laidley Lutheran church hall.

Initially, Laidley was served by the Blenheim Baptist Church. In July 1949, land was purchased near the Laidley Hospital for use by the Baptist church. In June 1952 the Blenheim Baptist Church was given permission to erect a Sunday School hall. The stump-capping ceremony for the hall was held on 5 July 1952, officiated by the President of the Queensland Baptist Union, Reverend R.O. Lockhart. On 7 September 1952, the hall (a combined church and hall) was officially opened. It was erected in 23 days using only volunteer labour. In February 1954, the hall was decided to be too small and that a separate church should be erected beside it, by demolishing the Blenheim Baptist Church, re-using the timber and relocating the church residence to Laidley. On 4 September 1954, the Laidley Baptist Church was officially opened by the President of the Queensland Baptist Union, Reverend F.T. Smith. The church building was at 25 Samuel Street and the hall at 27 Samuel Street. Both were sold into private ownership in August 2015 and March 2016 respectively. As at 2021, both buildings were still existing.

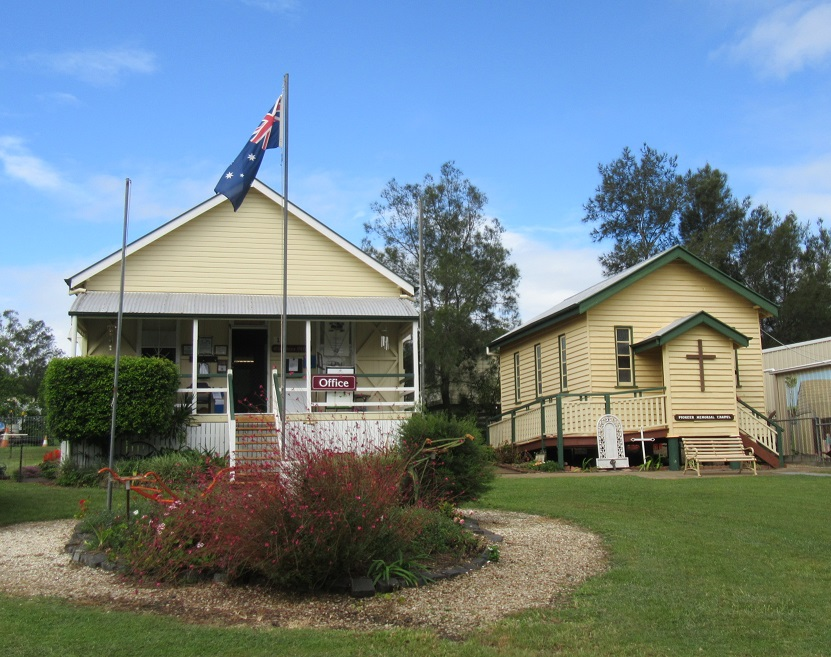
Laidley Pioneer Village, council chamber and chapel, April 2022

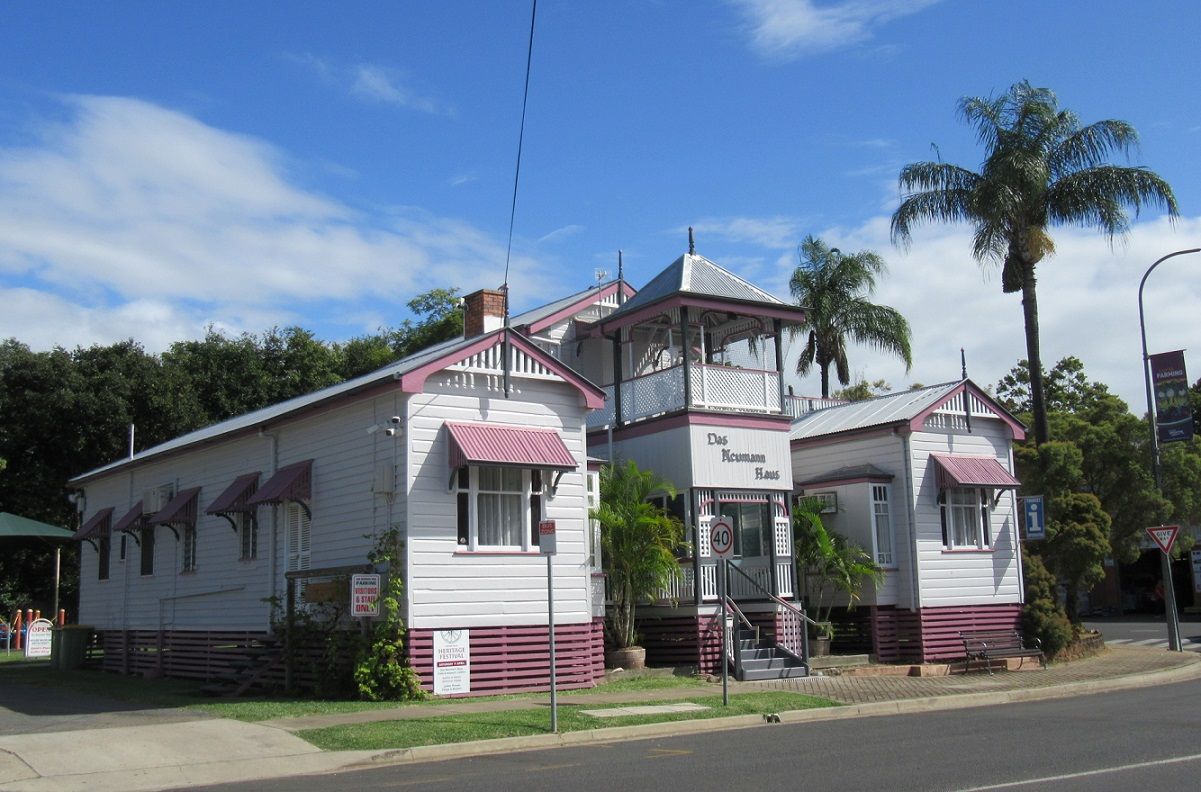
Das Neumann Haus Museum, view from William Street, April 2022

Laidley Pioneer Village and Museum was established in 1972 by the Laidley District Historical Society on the site of the original resting paddock used by horses of the Cobb & Co stagecoaches. It was the first heritage village developed in Queensland.

Laidley State High School opened on 29 January 1985; this effectively replaced the secondary department that operated at Laidley North State School from 1864 to 1984.

In 1998, Das Neumann Haus Museum opened to the public as an historic house museum. A visitor information centre, a cafe and a gift shop are also operated within the building.

The town was the centre of the Shire of Laidley until 2008, when the shire was incorporated into the new Lockyer Valley Region local government area.

The Laidley public library opened in 2017.

On 30 January 2024, Laidley was flooded following 300 millimetres (12 in) of rain the previous night.

== Demographics ==
In the 2016 census, the locality of Laidley had a population of 3,808 people, of which 47.1% identified as male and 52.9% as female. The median age was 42. 4.8% identified as Aboriginal or Torres Strait Islander (184 people). 79.6% were born in Australia. The next most common countries of birth were England 3.2% and New Zealand 1.5%. 87.3% spoke only English at home. Other languages spoken at home included Japanese 0.4%, German 0.3% and Mandarin 0.3%. The most common responses for religion were No Religion 26.5%, Catholic 20.8% and Anglican 15.3%. 49% were full-time employed, with 47.9% of employees working either as labourers, technicians and trades workers or community and personal service workers. Median rent paid for any type of dwelling was $270 per week, while median mortgage payments were $1,300 per month.

In the 2021 census, the locality of Laidley had a population of 3,809 people.

== Heritage listings ==
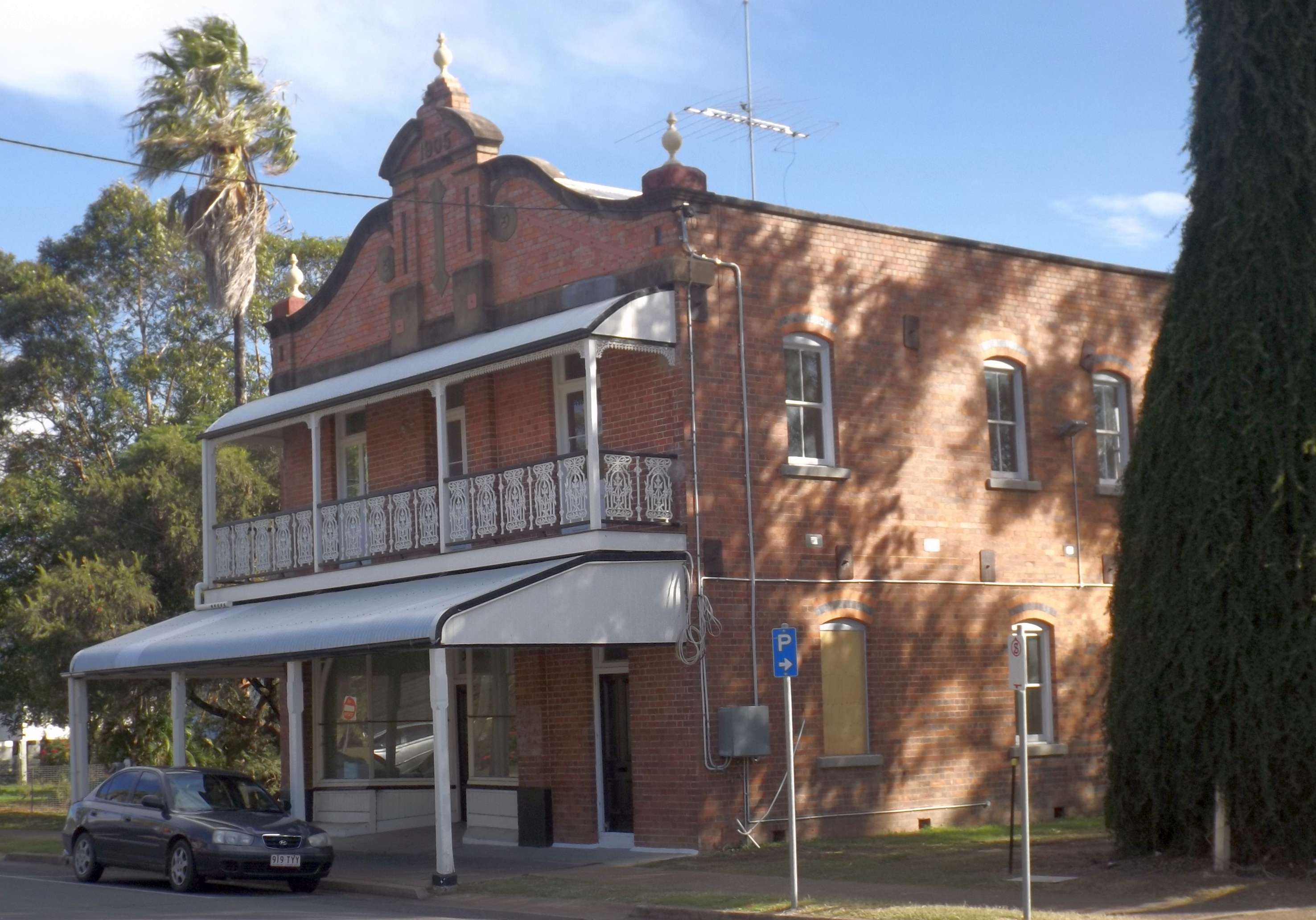
Whitehouse's Bakery, 2015

Laidley has a number of heritage-listed sites, including:

- Corduroy Road Remains, Toowoomba–Ipswich Road
- Whitehouse's Bakery, 91 Patrick Street
- Exchange Hotel, 134–138 Patrick Street
- G Wyman Building, 140–142 Patrick Street
- Das Neumann Haus Museum, corner of William Street and Patrick Street

== Attractions ==
- Laidley Pioneer Village and Museum, 92 Drayton Street (27.6499°S 152.3915°E).
- Das Neumann Haus Museum, corner William Street and Patrick Street.
- Queensland National Hotel, 90 Patrick St, Laidley QLD 4341

== Climate ==
The Lockyer Valley is the driest part of the South East Queensland region. The area has a humid subtropical climate, with relatively long, hot and rainy summers and mild, sunny winters. Although rainfall is variable, thunderstorms are a frequent occurrence during summer, while winter brings the occasional frost.

Climate data for nearest weather station – University of QLD Gatton
| Month | Jan | Feb | Mar | Apr | May | Jun | Jul | Aug | Sep | Oct | Nov | Dec | Year |
|---|---|---|---|---|---|---|---|---|---|---|---|---|---|
| Record high °C (°F) | 44.5 (112.1) | 45.7 (114.3) | 41.1 (106.0) | 37.4 (99.3) | 33.7 (92.7) | 31.5 (88.7) | 29.0 (84.2) | 37.9 (100.2) | 39.5 (103.1) | 41.6 (106.9) | 42.8 (109.0) | 43.5 (110.3) | 45.7 (114.3) |
| Mean daily maximum °C (°F) | 31.6 (88.9) | 30.8 (87.4) | 29.6 (85.3) | 27.2 (81.0) | 23.8 (74.8) | 21.1 (70.0) | 20.8 (69.4) | 22.5 (72.5) | 25.6 (78.1) | 28.2 (82.8) | 30.2 (86.4) | 31.4 (88.5) | 26.9 (80.4) |
| Mean daily minimum °C (°F) | 19.1 (66.4) | 19.0 (66.2) | 17.4 (63.3) | 13.7 (56.7) | 10.2 (50.4) | 7.6 (45.7) | 6.3 (43.3) | 6.7 (44.1) | 9.5 (49.1) | 13.2 (55.8) | 16.0 (60.8) | 18.1 (64.6) | 13.1 (55.6) |
| Record low °C (°F) | 11.9 (53.4) | 8.3 (46.9) | 6.7 (44.1) | 3.2 (37.8) | −0.2 (31.6) | −2.4 (27.7) | −5.6 (21.9) | −1.9 (28.6) | 0.0 (32.0) | 4.3 (39.7) | 6.3 (43.3) | 8.8 (47.8) | −5.6 (21.9) |
| Average precipitation mm (inches) | 109.4 (4.31) | 99.5 (3.92) | 79.2 (3.12) | 48.0 (1.89) | 45.3 (1.78) | 41.2 (1.62) | 36.4 (1.43) | 26.4 (1.04) | 34.4 (1.35) | 65.2 (2.57) | 77.3 (3.04) | 98.2 (3.87) | 765.6 (30.14) |
| Average precipitation days | 10.1 | 9.9 | 10.0 | 6.7 | 6.5 | 5.8 | 5.6 | 5.1 | 5.4 | 7.7 | 8.3 | 9.6 | 90.7 |

== Sport and recreation ==
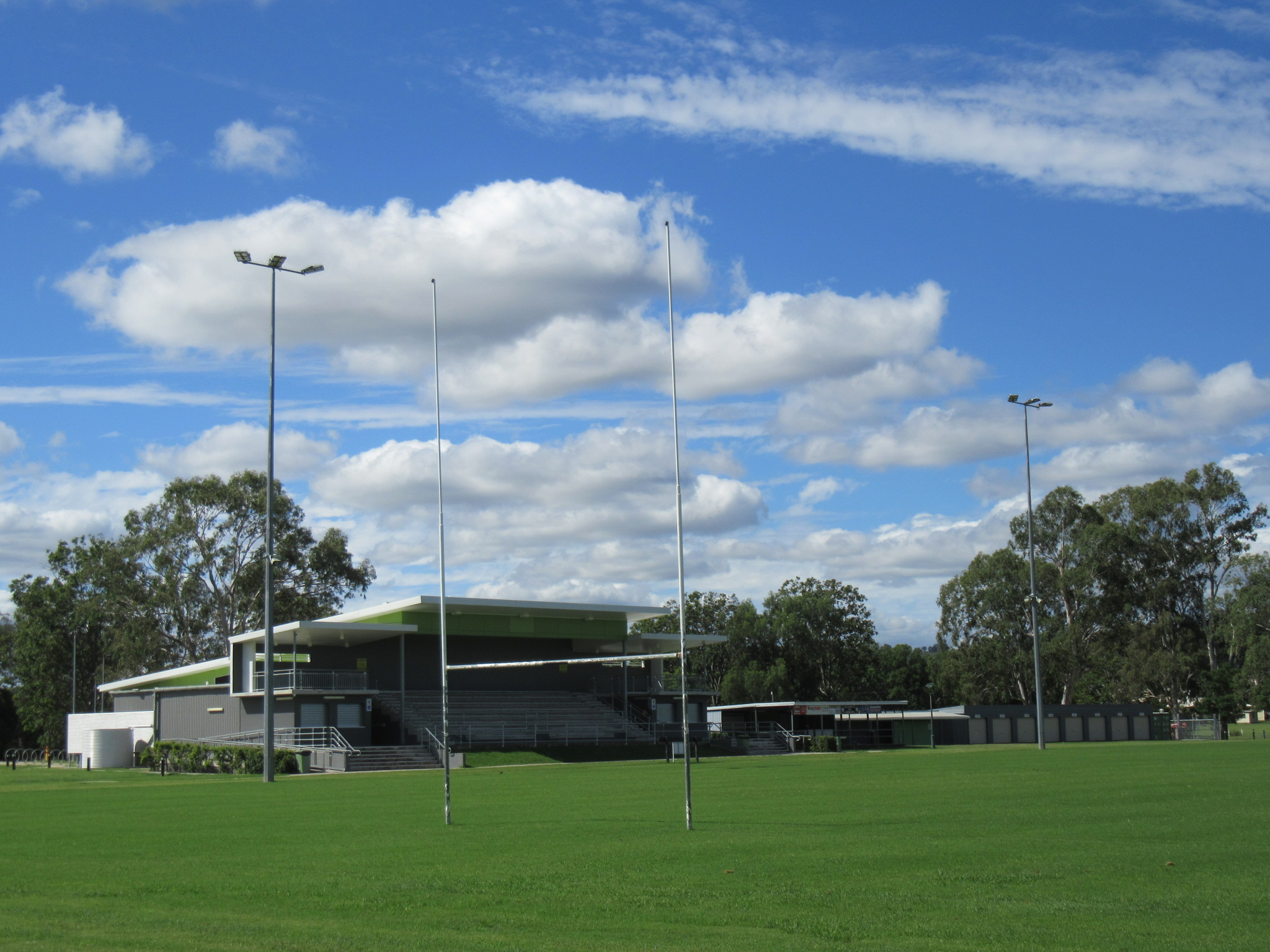
Laidley Sports and Recreation Reserve, April 2022

The Laidley Sports and Recreation Reserve is located between Ambrose Street (north) and Edward Street (south). It is the main sporting precinct in Laidley and sports homed at the facility include netball, soccer, rugby league, touch football, little athletics, a gymnasium and walking.

Swimming facilities: Dal Ryan War Memorial Pool, 44 John Street, Laidley. One pool is 25m long with six lanes, the other pool is for children. Barbecue facilities and a kiosk are on-site.

The Laidley Golf Club is a public twelve hole course adjacent to Lake Dyer, two kilometres from the township of Laidley on Wehlow Road off Gatton-Laidley Road. Established in 1951 at its present site, the original nine holes were designed by Ross Watson. A further three holes were designed by David Burrup in 2003. The competition course has thirteen different tees for the eighteen holes while the Social Course has fifteen different tees for the eighteen holes.

Lake Dyer Caravan & Camping Ground is situated on the shore of Lake Dyer between the villages of Laidley and Forest Hill. The lake is directly accessible from the caravan park and open to the public for recreational use.

== Education ==
Laidley District State School is a government primary (Early Childhood–Year 6) school for boys and girls at 232 Patrick Street (27.6236°S 152.3953°E). In 2017, the school had an enrolment of 375 students with 27 teachers and 20 non-teaching staff (14 full-time equivalent). In 2018, the school had an enrolment of 379 students with 30 teachers (28 full-time equivalent) and 22 non-teaching staff (15 full-time equivalent). It includes a special education program.

St Mary's School is a Catholic primary (Prep–6) school for boys and girls at 37 John Street South (27.6341°S 152.3916°E). In 2017, the school had an enrolment of 267 students with 23 teachers (20 full-time equivalent) and 15 non-teaching staff (10 full-time equivalent).

Laidley State High School is a government secondary (7–12) school for boys and girls at 98 Alfred Street (27.6362°S 152.4044°E). In 2017, the school had an enrolment of 694 students with 65 teachers (63 full-time equivalent) and 33 non-teaching staff (23 full-time equivalent). In 2018, the school had an enrolment of 699 students with 67 teachers (64 full-time equivalent) and 34 non-teaching staff (24 full-time equivalent). tt includes a special education program.

== Amenities ==
The Lockyer Valley Regional Council operates a customer service centre and a public library in Spicer Street.

Laidley Hospital and Community Health Services, located at 75 William Street, provides for a range of general care and emergency services as well as allied health, clinics and community health, and is part of the West Moreton Health network. The office of the Meals on Wheels services is also housed on the premises.

The Laidley show grounds are run by the Laidley Show Society (Laidley Agricultural and Industrial Society). The annual show is held there over two days in July. The grounds are available for hire and are open for camping. The Society also organises several events throughout the year, including the Laidley Christmas Street Carnival and the annual Show Ball.

There area a number of churches in Laidley:

- St Saviour's Anglican Church, 28 Ambrose Street (27.6310°S 152.3968°E).
- St Patrick's Catholic Church, 1–3 John Street South (27.6356°S 152.3911°E).
- Laidley Uniting Church, 45 Patrick Street (27.6357°S 152.3930°E).
- Redeemer Lutheran Church Laidley, 21 Patrick St (27.6380°S 152.3924°E)

== Gallery ==
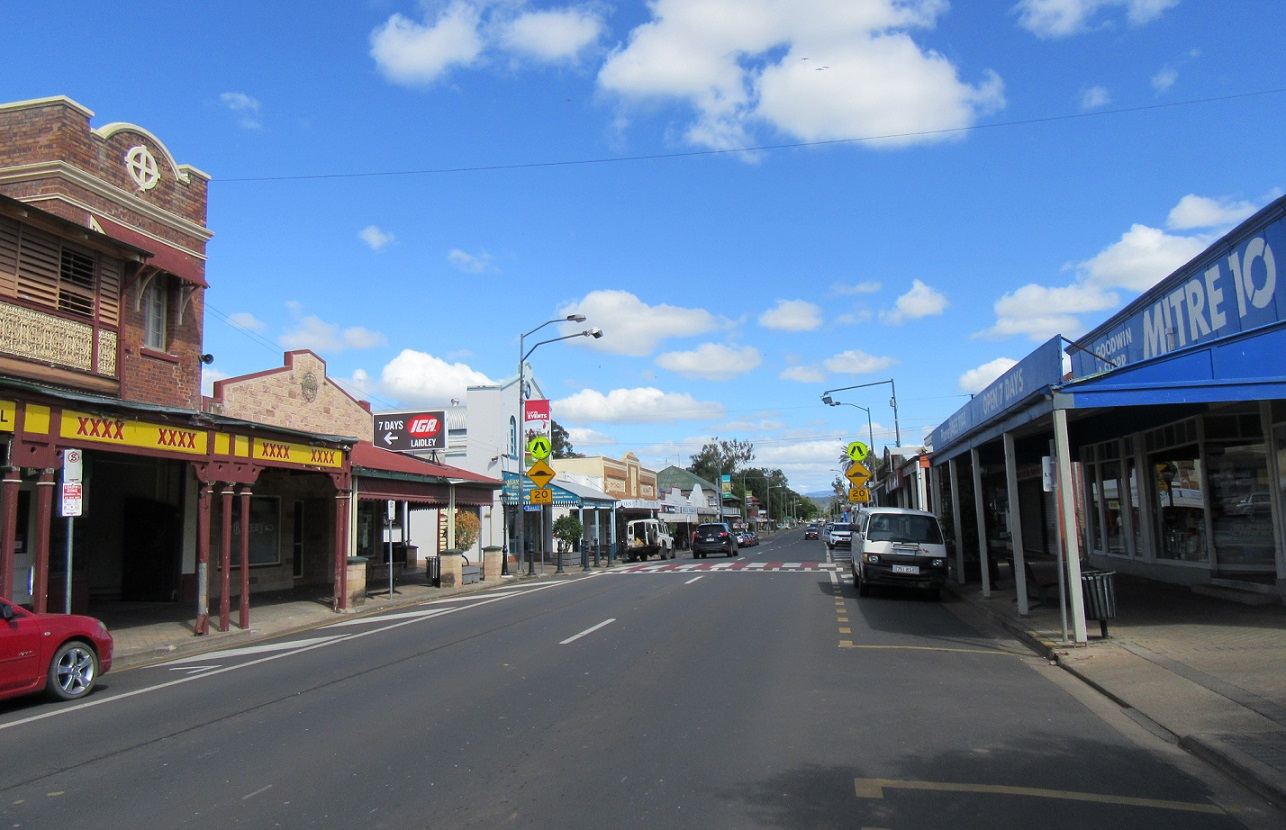
Laidley main street, Patrick Street, April 2022

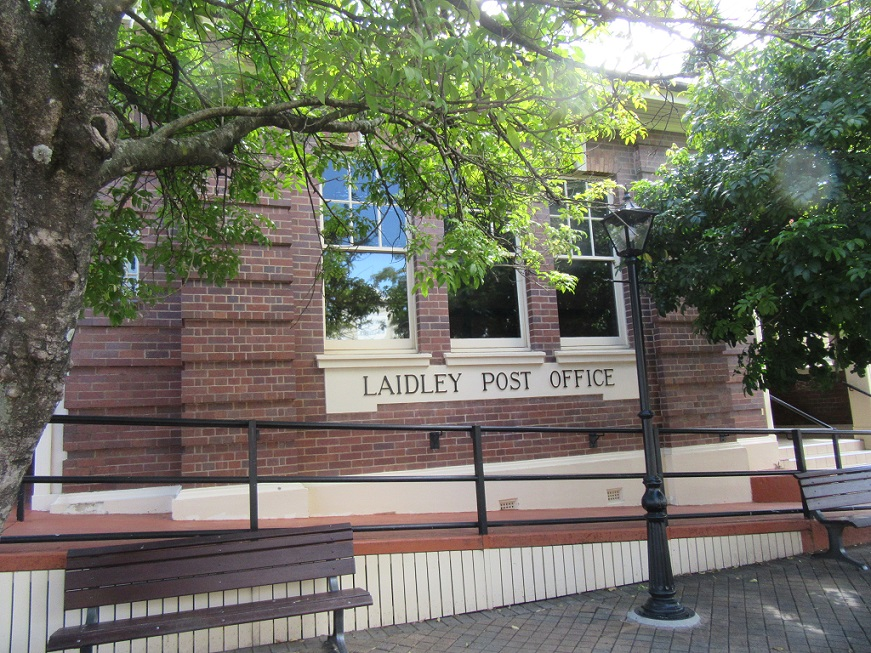
Laidley Post Office, April 2022

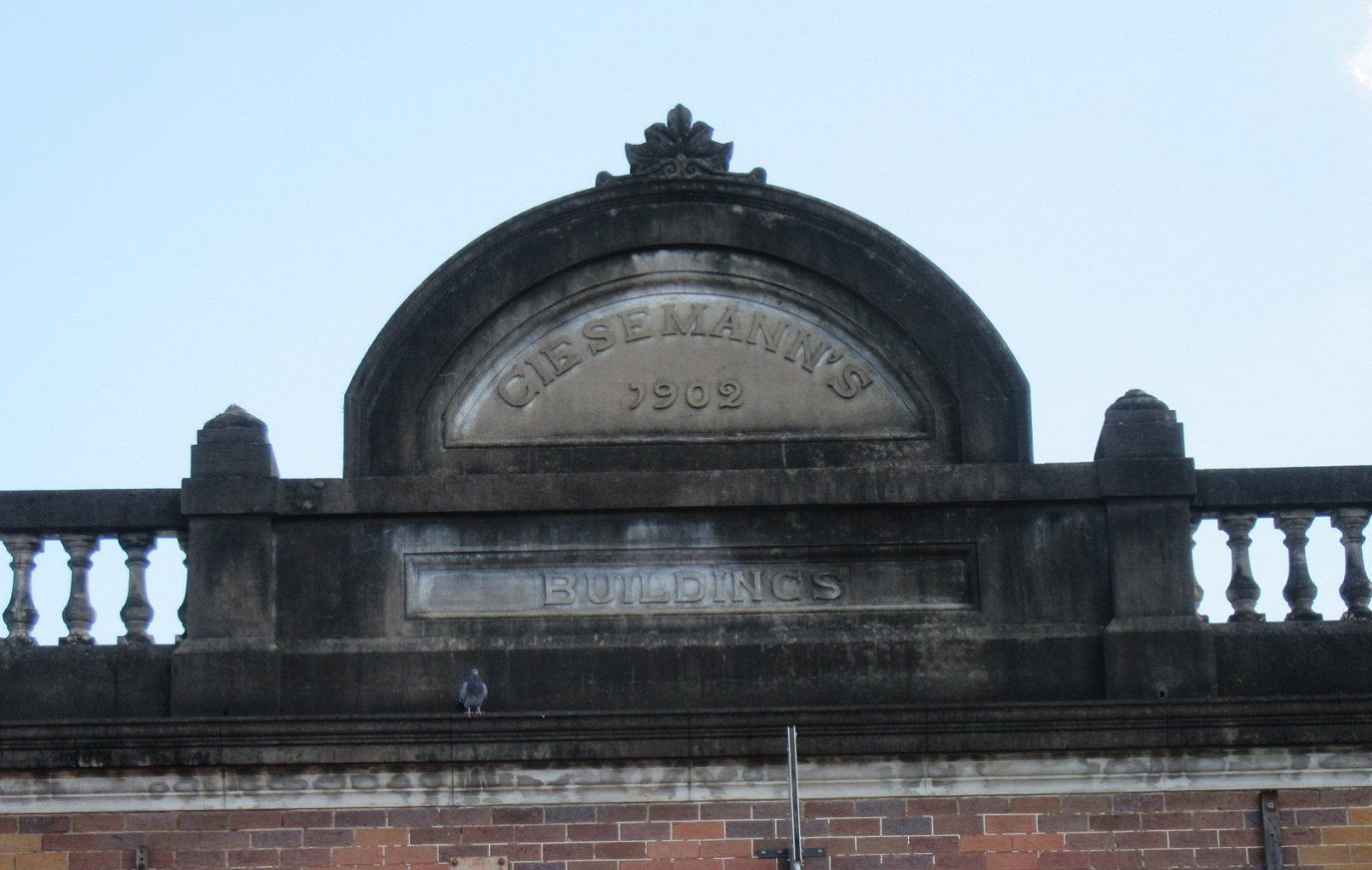
Giesemann's Buildings 1902, Patrick St, April 2022

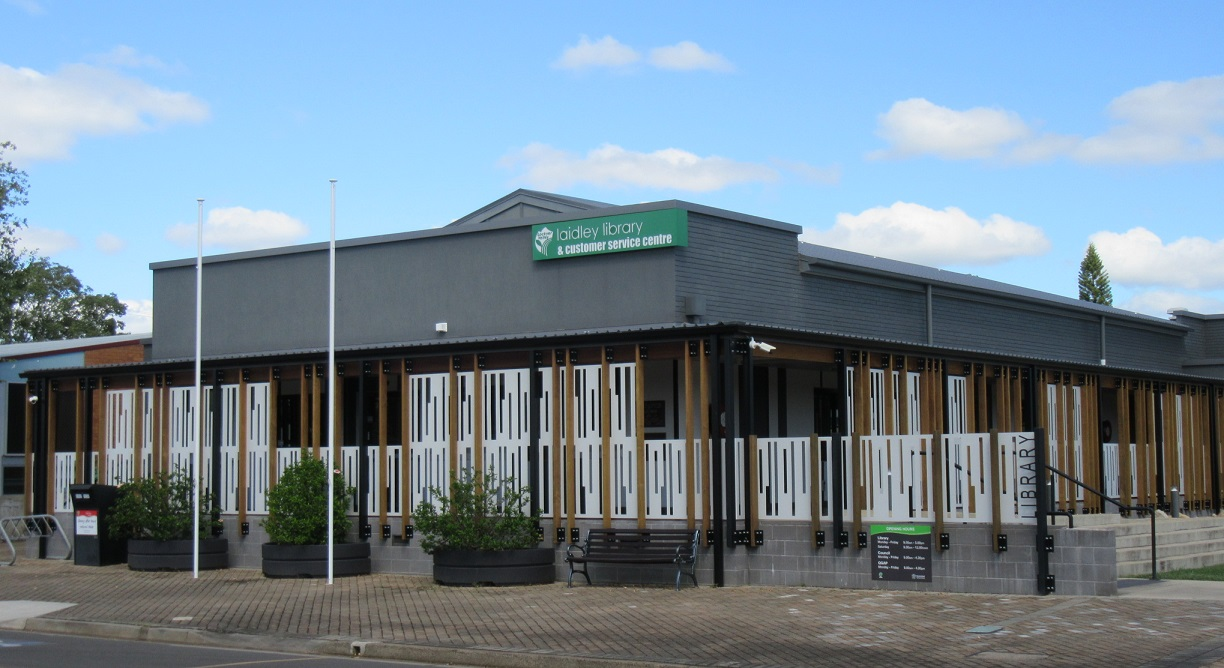
Lockyer Valley Regional Council customer service centre and library, April 2022

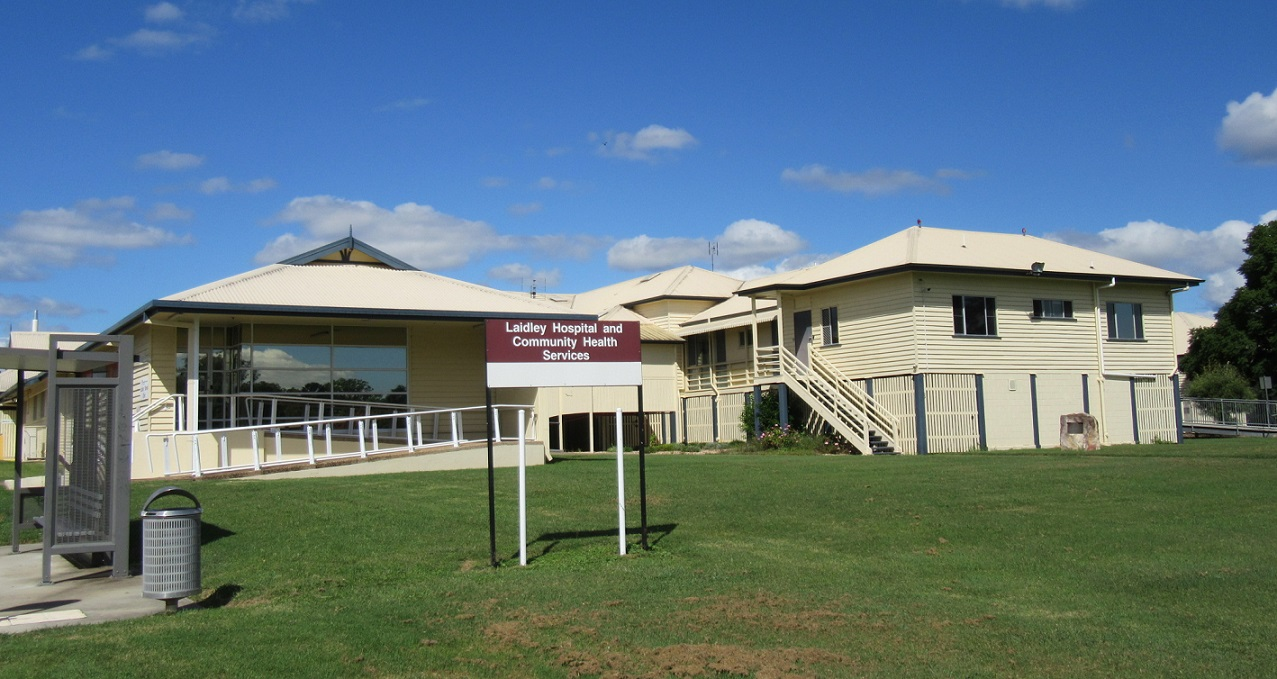
Laidley Hospital, April 2022

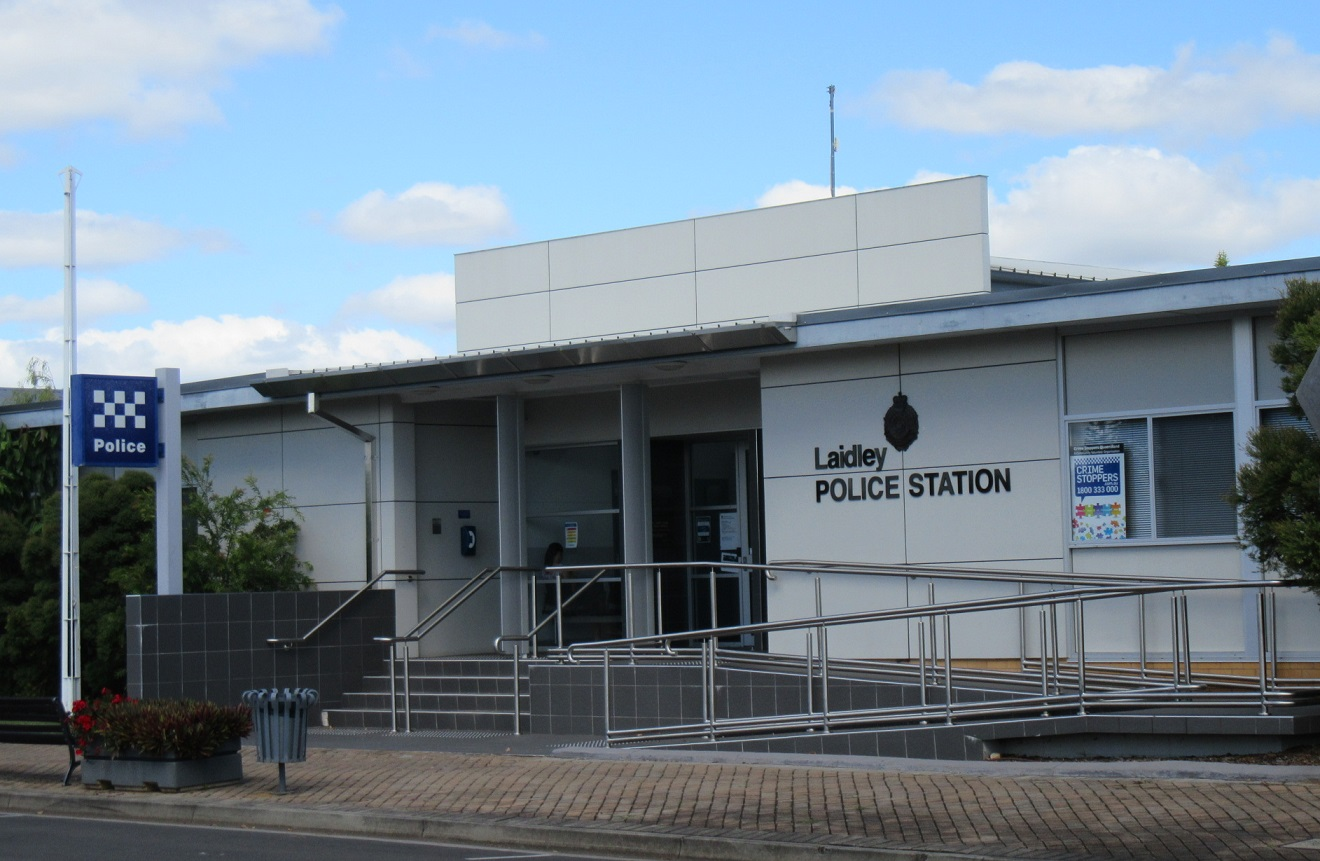
Laidley Police Station, April 2022

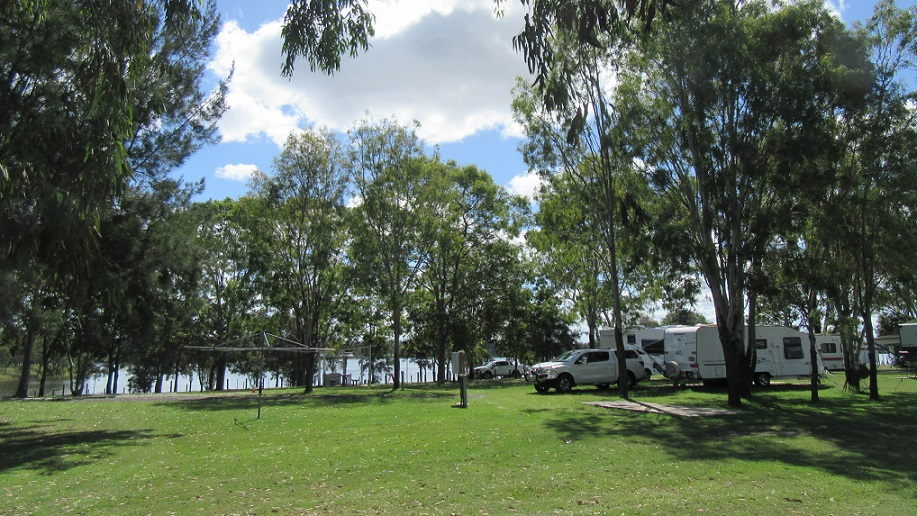
Lake Dyer camping ground, April 2022

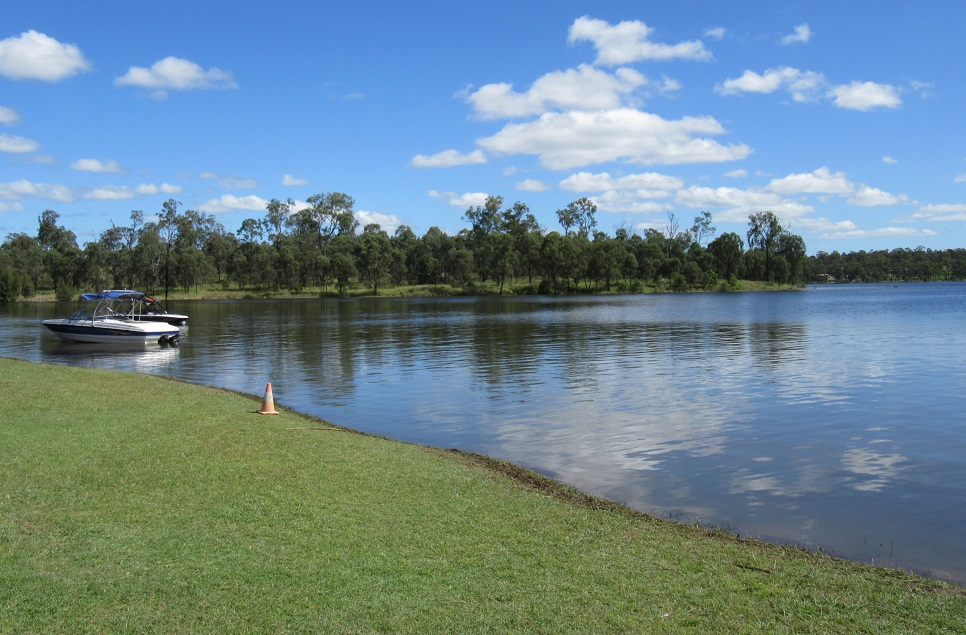
Lake Dyer, April 2022

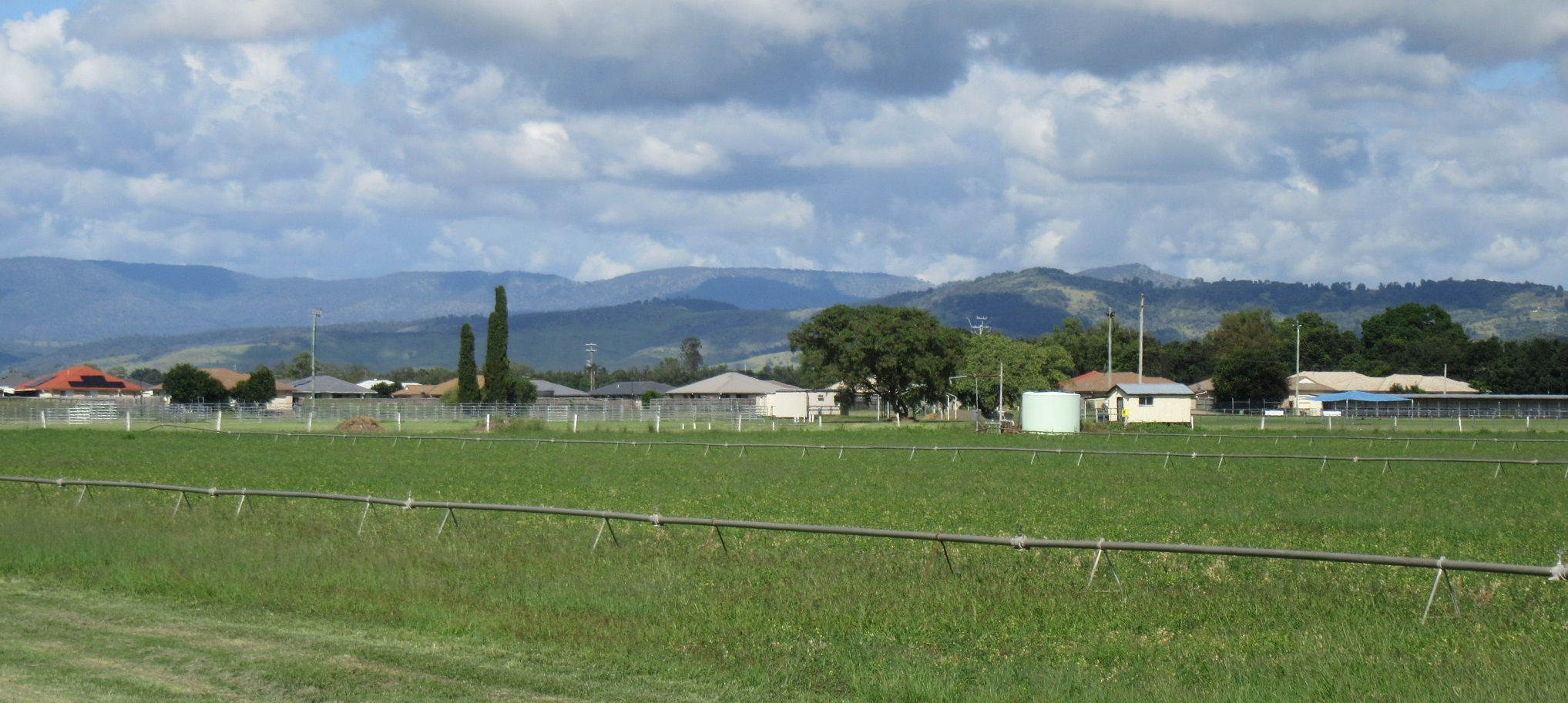
Laidley QLD rural landscape, April 2022

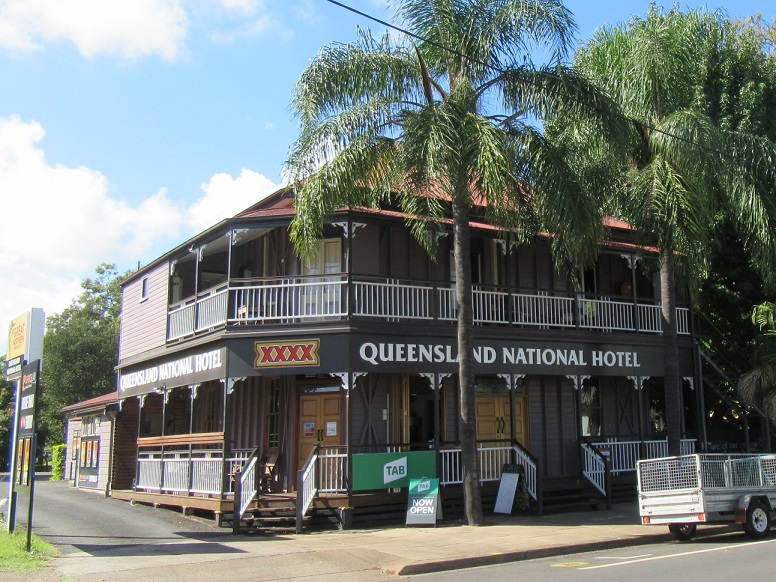
Laidley Queensland National Hotel, April 2022

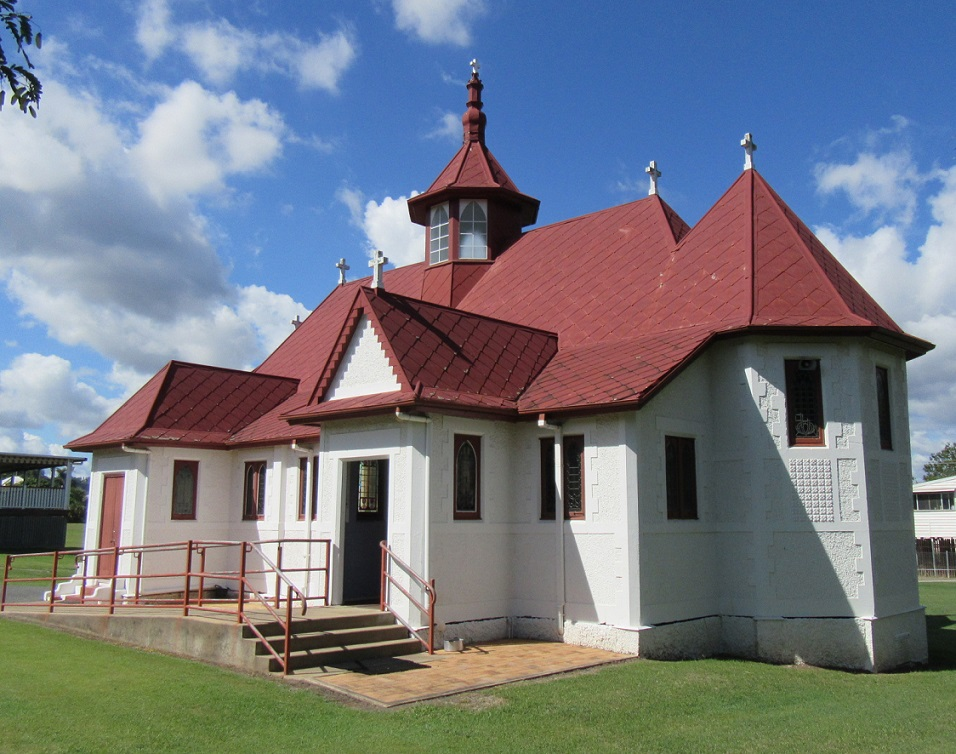
St Saviour's Anglican Church, April 2022

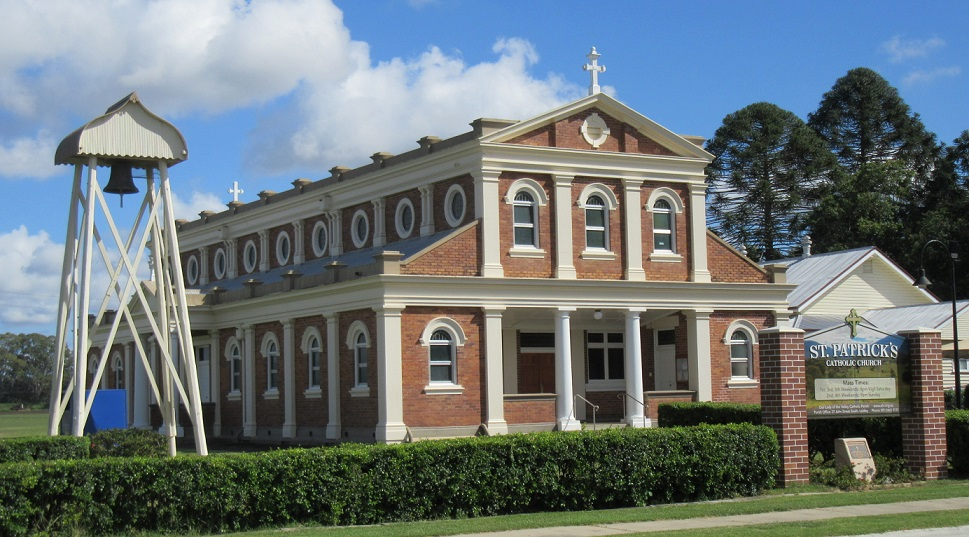
St Patrick's Catholic Church, April 2022

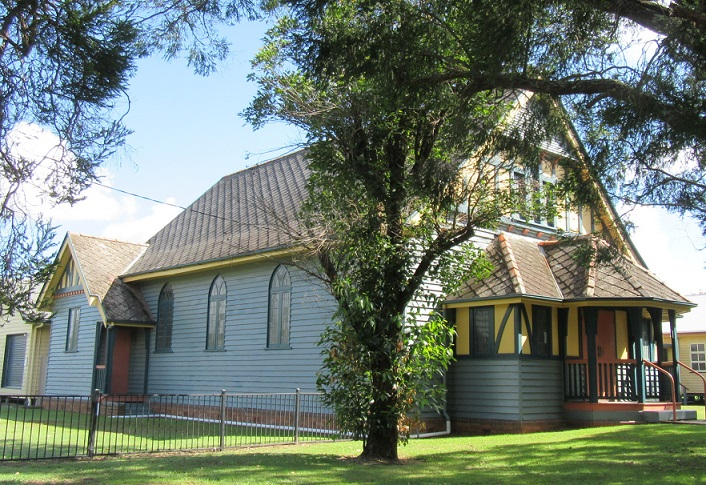
Uniting Church, April 2022
