= Rockhampton Masonic Hall =

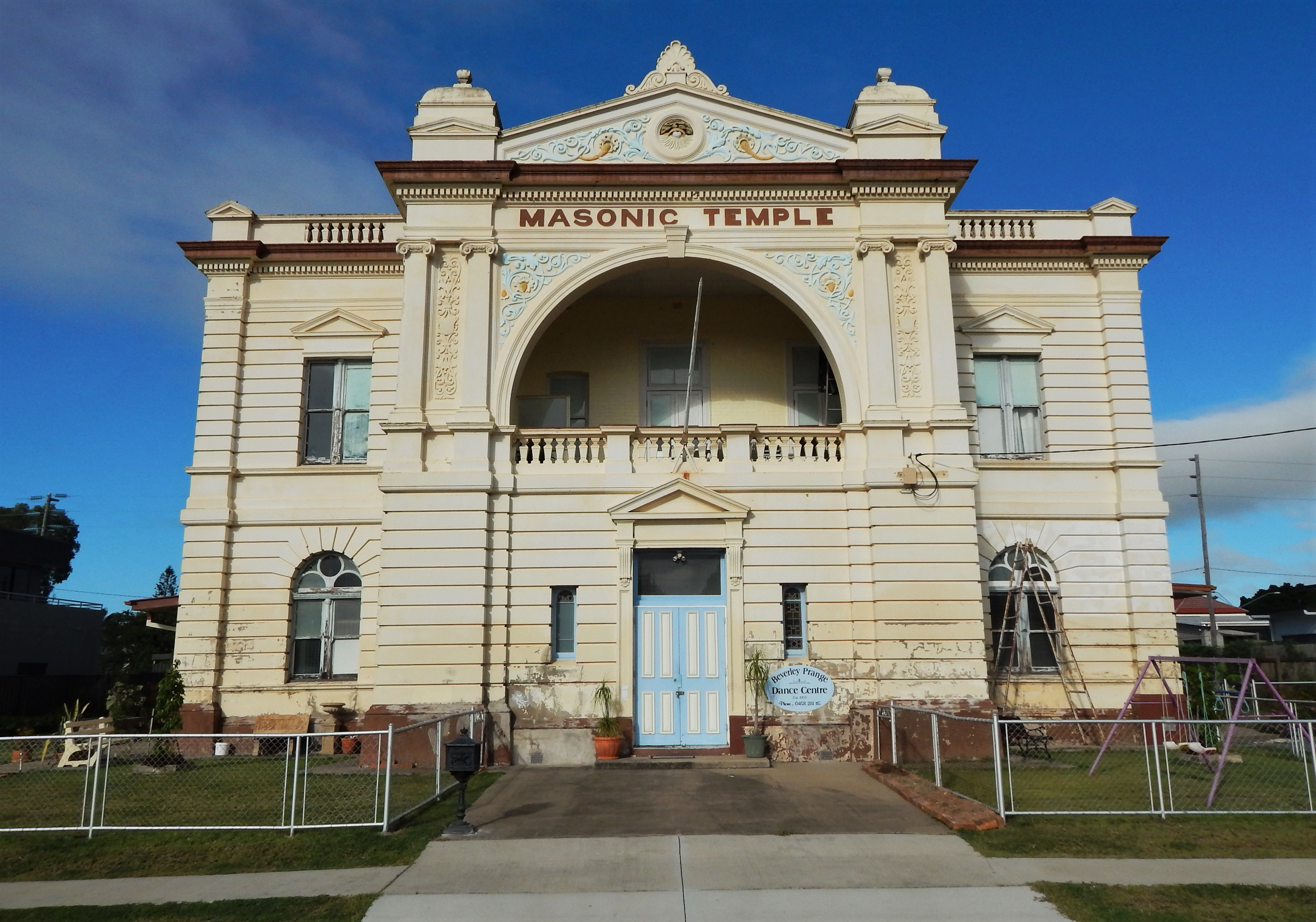
- Rockhampton Masonic Hall, 2020

- Location within Queensland Location within Australia
- 23.3783°S 150.5066°E
- Location: 112–114 Kent Street, Rockhampton, Rockhampton Region, Queensland, Australia

History
- Design period: 1900–1914 (early 20th century)
- Built: 1900–1901

Site notes
- Architect: Eaton & Bates
- Architectural style: Classicism

Queensland Heritage Register
- Official name: Masonic Hall, Kent Street, Rockhampton, Masonic Lodge, Masonic Temple
- Type: state heritage (built)
- Designated: 23 June 2000
- Reference no.: 601488
- Significant period: 1900–1901, 1950s (fabric); 1901–ongoing (social)
- Builders: Bradshaw & Ricketts

Rockhampton Masonic Hall is a heritage-listed masonic hall at 112–114 Kent Street, Rockhampton, Rockhampton Region, Queensland, Australia. It was designed by Eaton & Bates and built from 1900 to 1901 by Bradshaw & Ricketts. It is also known as Masonic Lodge and Masonic Temple. It was added to the Queensland Heritage Register on 23 June 2000.

== History ==
Freemasonry was first established in Queensland in 1859 when dispensation was granted by the Provincial Grand Lodge of New South Wales (English Constitution, hereafter abbreviated as E.C.), authorising what was then the most northerly lodge in Australia, the "North Australian Lodge" of Brisbane. Masonry continued its northward progress, when in 1862 the first lodge in Rockhampton, named Leichhardt No.932 E.C. in honour of the explorer Ludwig Leichhardt, was consecrated:

The Leichhardt Masonic Lodge (English Constitution) was opened in Rockhampton on Tuesday, the 23rd September, 1862, at high noon, in the new Masonic Hall. There were upwards of forty brethren present. Sixteen new members joined, and twenty-two were proposed for initiation. Mr. W.J. Brown was duly installed as Worshipful Master by Past Master Marks and Past Master Charet. The complete list of officers was as follows :- Brother W.J. Brown, W.M.; Brother J. Bennett, S.W.; Brother A.F. Wood, J.W.; Brother J.A. Watts, S.D.; Brother J.E. Rutherford, J.D.; Brother J. Hunter, I.G.; Brother E. Kilner, Hon. Secretary and Treasurer.

Rockhampton township was initially laid out by survey in 1857 and the first town allotments were sold by auction in 1858. The Canoona goldrush of 1858 gave impetus to the early development of the township of Rockhampton as both a river port and trading centre, resulting in Rockhampton becoming the administrative centre for Central Queensland.

The first Masonic Hall in Rockhampton was built c. 1862 and was situated on Quay Lane (adjoined Skardon's Hotel), between Denham and Fitzroy Streets. This building was later destroyed by fire in 1866.

In 1869 a second Masonic Hall was built, situated on East Street (approximately No.31 East Street), between Fitzroy and Archer Streets, Rockhampton. The First Masonic Lodge meeting at these East Street premises was held in January 1870. An 1878 reference to this East Street premises, stated:

"The Masonic fraternity own a brick building in East-street, dreary looking from the outside; but the initiated know best its internal excellencies."

Rockhampton experienced a period of steady growth during 1858 through to 1882. With the discovery of the vast mining potential at Mount Morgan in 1882, Rockhampton benefited from the generated wealth and rapidly expanded. This led to a period of major building in the heart of the city particularly evident along Quay Street besides the wharves, as well as amongst the array of affluent residences erected on "The Range".

At a Masonic meeting in Rockhampton on 14 April 1882, various resolutions were passed including that a "Masonic Lodge be formed under the Scottish Constitution" and that this Lodge "be called Douglas in honour of the District Grand Master of Queensland, Scottish Constitution, The Hon. John Douglas". The Douglas No.677 Scottish Constitution (hereafter abbreviated as S.C.) was subsequently consecrated on 23 May 1882 at the East Street Masonic Hall.

John Douglas (1824–1904) was a New South Wales and Queensland politician and administrator. He was Queensland Premier from 1877 to 1879, and during 1885–1904 was Government Resident at Thursday Island, Torres Strait. Douglas was also noted as a Freemason and grand master, who represented Rockhampton in the Queensland Legislative Assembly during 1863–1865.

In 1889 certain members of the Douglas Lodge No.677 S.C. expressed their dissatisfaction at the communication delays with the Grand Lodge of Scotland. Spirited discussions arose as to whether Douglas Lodge should remain with the Grand Lodge of Scotland, or join the proposed Grand Lodge of Queensland. On 1 October 1889 a motion was passed that Douglas Lodge "gives its hearty support and assistance in the formation of a Grand Lodge of Queensland. This caused quite an upheaval in the Lodge but the motion remained on the minute book and when the Grand Lodge of Free and Accepted Masons of Queensland was formed on the 25th June, 1904, Douglas 677 affiliated with it and became No.13 Queensland Constitution."

During this period the premises at East Street were not considered suitable for lodge meetings because of the proximity of the public and the horse stables situated next door. In 1889 as a result, the Masonic Hall Company was formed by the Leichhardt and Douglas Lodges and the Rockhampton Chapter. This was a Public Company in which many Rockhampton citizens who were not masons are said to have bought shares.

The Masonic Hall Company was later able to purchase land at 110 Kent Street, Rockhampton. Construction of a new Masonic Hall, Rockhampton's third, at this new site was commenced in 1900. The consecration ceremony for these premises took place on 27 February 1901. Rockhampton's Morning Bulletin reported:

The ceremony of the consecration of the new Masonic Hall in Kent-street, near Archer-street, took place yesterday. For some time past the old Masonic Hall in East-street has proved to be inadequate, and this led to the erection of a more suitable building. Messrs. Eaton and Bates were the architects... and the contractors were Messrs. Bradshaw and Ricketts. The hall cost £2500, and it was constructed with credit to both the architects and contractors. The visitors from Brisbane and other parts of Queensland who took part in the consecration ceremony... speak in the highest terms of the new hall and pronounce it the finest Masonic Hall in Queensland. The conveniences are all that could be desired, while the acoustic properties are simply perfect... The hall was consecrated in the afternoon, and the ceremony was followed by a dinner in the evening... [attended by some 200 quests].

Shortly after the consecration the first Masonic meeting at the Kent Street premises took place on 6 March 1901.

The architectural partnership of George Thomas Eaton and Albert Edmund Bates, which first opened an office in Rockhampton c. 1894, were responsible for the design of an array of prominent residences and other public and private buildings in Rockhampton, Mount Morgan, and other Central Queensland locations. In 1901, Arthur Beckford Polin joined the partnership, and in 1902 the firm's main office moved to Brisbane, though branch offices were retained in Rockhampton and Townsville.

The Kent Street Masonic Lodge is a purpose-built extant stone and brick, two storey building, consisting of an upper storey (lodge room, refreshment hall, and dressing rooms), and a lower level which has been utilised for banquets, balls and other public purposes. A history of Douglas Lodge No.677 S.C. states:

"The ground floor was used for many years as a dance hall, and in the 1950s an extension was made to the building. Later the Hall Board turned the ground floor into a second lodge room, air-conditioned the building, and today we have a Temple of which all masons may be justly proud."

With the formation of the Grand Lodge of Free and Accepted Masons of Queensland in 1904, Rockhampton's Douglas Lodge No.677 S.C. became affiliated and thereafter became known as Douglas No.13 Queensland Constitution (hereafter abbreviated as Q.C.). The first meeting of Douglas No.13 Q.C. was held on 17 August 1904, during which the oath of allegiance to the Grand Lodge of Queensland was administered. In 1904 this Lodge was stated as having "69 Brethren" on its roll, but dwindled to forty by 1906. In 1908 the original Scottish Charter was returned to those members who had withdrawn from the Lodge in 1904. This situation saw the revival of Douglas Lodge No.677 S.C., which in a history of the Athelstane Masonic Lodge recounted as a unique situation of twin lodges (Douglas No.13 Q.C., and Douglas 677 S.C.), both of which are "direct descendants of the one parent lodge - Douglas 677 S.C. of 1882".

Masonic activity also took place outside of Rockhampton in surrounding areas. At Mount Chalmers township a new Lodge (Mount Chalmers Lodge) commenced regular meetings on 29 September 1908. At a meeting of this Lodge on 29 February 1916, "the matter of removing the Charter to some more populous centre" was brought up for discussion though no decision was made at this time. It wasn't till 23 May 1916 before the decision was finally made to move to North Rockhampton. The final meeting at Mount Chalmers took place on 12 September 1916, after which "Dispensation to hold the Installation Meeting in the North Rockhampton Council Chambers" was approved and took place on 7 October 1916, thus severing this Lodge's ties with the community of Mount Chalmers.

In late January 1918 a record flood of the Fitzroy River flooded the Lodge Room of the North Rockhampton Lodge (formally Mount Chalmers Lodge). Permission was sought to hold meetings at the Kent Street Temple until the end of May 1918 when this Lodge was able to return to its North Rockhampton premises. On 14 August 1918 the North Rockhampton Lodge agreed to purchase a building site in Musgrave Street, North Rockhampton. This site was held by this Lodge for many years until the building project was finally shelved. On 15 December 1921 the North Rockhampton Lodge decided that the inadequacies of the Council Chambers as a suitable Masonic venue necessitated the permanent change of venue to the Kent Street premises. The final meeting of the North Rockhampton Lodge at the Council Chambers took place on 7 January 1922.

The formation of the United Grand Lodge of Queensland in 1921 saw Douglas Lodge No.677 S.C. change to the Constitution of the Queensland Grand Lodge, as well as renumbered and becoming Douglas Lodge No.23 Q.C. As both Lodges (Douglas Lodge No.13 Q.C. and Douglas Lodge No.23 Q.C.) had now joined the United Grand Lodge of Queensland, Douglas Lodge No.13 Q.C. changed its name to "Athelstane", taking its name from the Athelstane Range on which much of Rockhampton is situated.

At this time Athelstane Lodge was stated as having eighty members on its roll. With these changes Athelstane Lodge was also given a new charter and by-laws and then renumbered, becoming 35 U.G.L.Q.. Douglas Lodge No.23 Q.C. retained its name "Douglas" and its strong Scottish influence, but was similarly renumbered, becoming No.36 U.G.L.Q.. A history of the Athelstane Lodge noted that the change over to the United Grand Lodge of Queensland was carried out smoothly, with each Lodge taking the oath of allegiance and thereafter simply carrying on under their respective Constitutions. The Kent Street premises are currently still utilised by Rockhampton's Masons.

== Description ==
The Masonic Hall is a two-storey masonry building addressing Kent Street. It is an imposing building within the streetscape, on a level grassed site which runs through to the street at the rear.

The front north-eastern facade, addressing Kent Street, is articulated with decoration and classical ornamentation. It features strong indented horizontal coursing, string courses dividing the upper and lower levels, a cornice with dentils and a balustraded parapet. It has triangular pediments to the upper windows and entrance door, and arched heads to the windows of the lower level.

The projecting central bay of this facade has an arched opening and masonry balustrade to the upper level balcony, Ionic pilasters topped with domed turrets and ball finials at the corners, and a pedimented parapet.

Perpendicular to the front section of the building is the two-storey wing of the Lodge Room and meeting halls. It has arched headed windows and a gable roof, but little decoration in comparison to the front facade. Abutting both sides of this wing on the lower level are skillion-roofed extensions.

== Heritage listing ==
The Masonic Hall was listed on the Queensland Heritage Register on 23 June 2000 having satisfied the following criteria.

The place is important in demonstrating the evolution or pattern of Queensland's history.

The Kent Street Masonic Hall is important in illustrating the evolution of Queensland's history having been purpose-built for the needs and use of freemasonry in and around Rockhampton. This place is the third and only extant Masonic premises in Rockhampton, constructed during the boom building period of the late 19th century that followed the discovery of the mineral wealth at Mount Morgan.

The place is important in demonstrating the principal characteristics of a particular class of cultural places.

This Masonic Hall is important in exhibiting aesthetic characteristics valued by the community, being a prominent feature in the local streetscape and a grand example of regional design for the requirements and symbolism associated with freemasonry. This place is also a significant example of architectural design undertaken by the partnership of Eaton and Bates who were particularly prominent in Rockhampton from 1894 to the 1900s.

The place is important because of its aesthetic significance.

This Masonic Hall is important in exhibiting aesthetic characteristics valued by the community, being a prominent feature in the local streetscape and a grand example of regional design for the requirements and symbolism associated with freemasonry.

The place has a strong or special association with a particular community or cultural group for social, cultural or spiritual reasons.

The Kent Street Masonic Hall also has a strong association with the Rockhampton community, particularly for local Freemasons and their families, as the principal and symbolic place for the practice of freemasonry in the city. These premises have been an important centre for cultural and social activities at this site since 1901, and are integral to the history of several Masonic lodges in and around Rockhampton whose origins stem back to the lodge established in 1862.
