= Anzac Memorial Park, Townsville =

Anzac Memorial Park
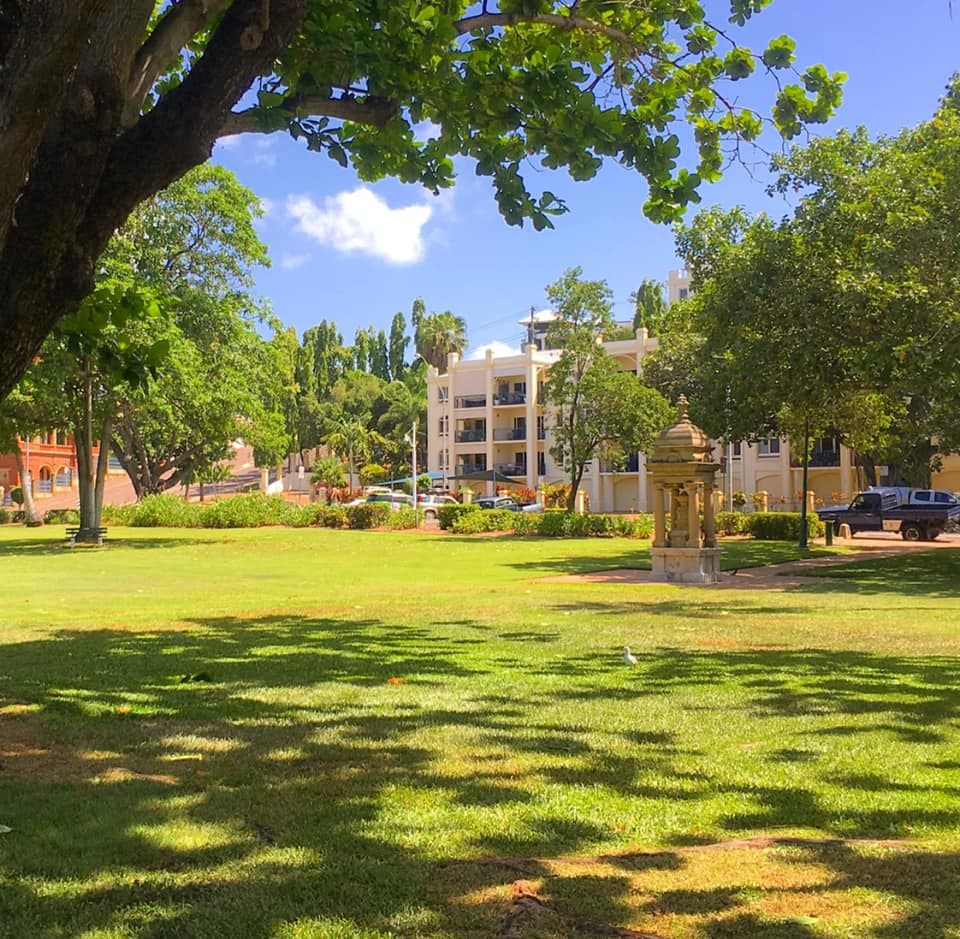
- Anzac Memorial Park in 2019 & The W.J. Castling Memorial on right (1908)

- Location within Queensland
- 19.255°S 146.8225°E
- Location: The Strand, Townsville CBD, City of Townsville, Queensland, Australia

History
- Design period: 1900–1914 (early 20th century)
- Built: 1912–

Queensland Heritage Register
- Official name: Anzac Memorial Park and adjacent Banyan trees, The Strand Park, Townsville War Memorial
- Type: state heritage (landscape, built)
- Designated: 21 October 1992
- Reference no.: 600934
- Significant period: 1912– (social, historical); 1908, 1913, 1923–24, 1959, 1992 (fabric)
- Significant components: memorial – fountain, commemorative plaque, bandstand/rotunda, memorial – other, park / green space, memorial – drinking fountain, memorial – clock tower, memorial – gate/s, garden – bed/s, trees/plantings

Anzac Memorial Park is a heritage-listed memorial and park at The Strand, Townsville CBD, City of Townsville, Queensland, Australia. It was first built in 1912. It is also known as The Strand Park and Townsville War Memorial. It was added to the Queensland Heritage Register on 21 October 1992.

== History ==
Anzac Memorial Park was established as The Strand Park in the 1910s, but the foreshore along The Strand (Townsville's main frontage to Cleveland Bay) had developed as a recreation area from the 1860s, the earliest days of settlement. The whole of the foreshore between King and Howitt Streets was gazetted a temporary reserve for public purposes in February 1901, and a section of this, between the Customs House and King Street, was proclaimed a permanent reserve for park purposes in June 1912.

As early as 1866, Townsville's more affluent residents were constructing homes along the beachfront, and by 1872, three hotels had been erected opposite the present Anzac Memorial Park. The Strand was unformed at this time, being little more than a track along the foreshore, and there were no shade trees, but the beach was popular with bathers (mainly male) from at least the late 1870s. In 1881 the town council planted 30 cedar trees along the foreshore, and added cocoa and betel nut trees in early 1882. In 1883, following strong public demand, a road was made along the beach front to Kissing Point. By 1889, The Strand, between King Street and Kissing Point, made a glorious promenade on a moonlight night when the breeze blew straight and cool from Magnetic Island. Photographs of The Strand in 1888 show banyan trees several years old, as well as more recent plantings, and a reserve for public baths (opposite the then quarry site on The Strand) was gazetted in 1889.

One of the earliest structures erected along the foreshore was an ornamental fountain/bird-bath, extant by 1905, which remained in the park reserve to the 1950s at least. In 1908 a drinking fountain was constructed opposite Queen's Hotel, near the corner of Wickham Street and The Strand. It was located outside the park proper, on the road verge, and was erected as a memorial to William Joseph Castling, a butcher and former Mayor of Townsville. This drinking fountain was moved to the western end of the park, probably during road works after 1924.

One of the principal instigators of the establishment of a formal park along The Strand was John Henry Tyack, owner of Queen's Hotel 1899–1913, alderman in the Townsville City Council 1906–13, and mayor of Townsville in 1912. He had commissioned the elaborate re-building of Queen's Hotel, one of the few grand hotels of Northern Queensland, starting in 1902–04, and took an interest in beautifying the foreshore opposite. In April 1912, during Tyack's term as mayor, Townsville City Council applied to have the foreshore along The Strand, from the sea baths to King Street, gazetted as The Strand Park. The Council had already spent a considerable amount of money on foreshore improvements, and intended to spend more. In June, about 4.5 acres (1.8 ha) were proclaimed a permanent reserve for park purposes, extending from King Street to Cleveland Street.

As early as 1901, Council had considered erecting a new bandstand on the beach, but this project did not eventuate until 1913. Through Henry Tyack's efforts, a public subscription was raised for the construction of a small, ornate bandstand in the park. The structure was designed by Sydney architect Arthur Beckford Polin, who had designed the new Queen's Hotel for Tyack c. 1902, when resident in Townsville as the North Queensland representative of the architectural firm of Eaton, Bates and Polin. J Crase & Co., ironworkers and brass founders of Brisbane, supplied the cast iron scroll work and pillars for the bandstand, in the same design as that used on the Queen's Hotel, and construction was carried out by municipal employees. The bandstand was nearing completion when Tyack died on 28 July 1913, and it was dedicated in Tyack's memory on 27 September, by Alderman Robert Wilson McClelland, Mayor of Townsville. The stand was intended to cater for both band and vocal concerts, mainly during the summer months.

Initially, the bandstand was located opposite the main entrance gates to the park. It was relocated to the eastern end of the park when the Queensland Centenary Fountain was constructed on the same site in 1959.

In 1914–15, a bowling green and clubhouse were constructed on land at the southern end of The Strand Park, the land being leased by the newly established Townsville Bowls Club from the City Council. The first clubhouse was destroyed during Cyclone Althea in December 1971, the grass was replaced with an artificial green in 1992, and in 1994 the land occupied by the bowls club was excised from the park (and does not form part of the park's heritage listing).

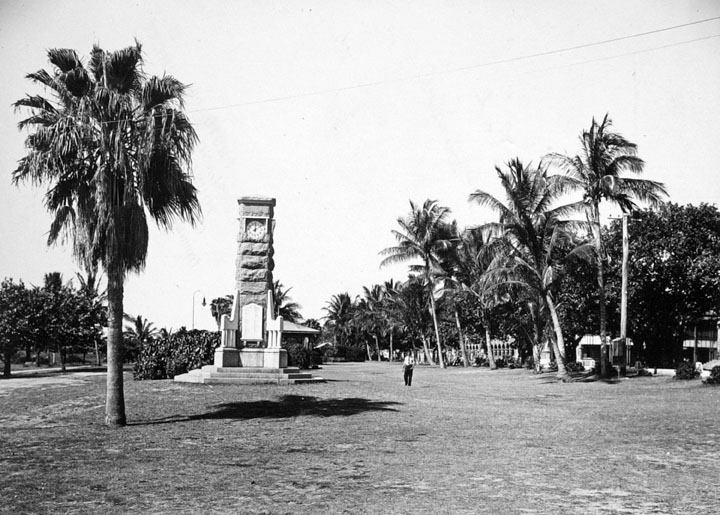
Anzac Memorial Park and Esplanade, Townsville, circa 1935

From at least the 1920s, The Strand Park was a focus for Anzac Day ceremonies. In 1923–24 a memorial clocktower was erected in the park, to the west of the bandstand. The memorial was financed by public subscription, and was designed and constructed by monumental masons Melrose and Fenwick of Townsville. The design had been finalised by September 1923, and the monument was completed by Anzac Day 1924, when it was unveiled and dedicated by the Governor of Queensland, Sir Matthew Nathan.

When first established, a picket fence divided the park from the roadway. By 1924, that section of the timber fence opposite Queen's Hotel, near the intersection of Wickham Street and The Strand, had been replaced with park entrance gates and fencing of wrought-iron panels set between masonry pillars. Also by 1924, several canon, probably trophies from the 1914–18 war, were located east and west of the bandstand; the park was lit by gas lamps; and a children's playground had been constructed at the western end of the park, near the sea baths. No evidence of this early playground survives.

In October 1925, the park was described as being tastefully laid out and planted with ornamental trees, shrubs with foliage of variegated colours, and lawns of couch grass, and attracted hundreds of people to the Sunday evening band and orchestral concerts. In the 1920s, the park was considered a tourist attraction, and was extended to over 6 acres (2.4 ha) in July 1926, by including the land up to the sea baths reserve.

Early in 1934, the name was changed to Anzac Memorial Park, and a metal arch bearing the new name was erected above the entrance gates, in time for the April 25 Anzac Day commemorations.

In April 1953, Anzac Memorial Park was extended to 9 acres (3.6 ha), and in 1959 the bandstand was relocated within the park to permit construction in its place of a fountain to commemorate the centenary of Queensland's separation from New South Wales.

In December 1971, Cyclone Althea caused substantial damage to the park. Many of the 1880s trees were destroyed and others stripped of their leaves. Subsequently, the Townsville City Council erected a plaque in the park, to commemorate the role of the Australian Army in the restoration of Townsville after the cyclone.

Prior to the Battle of the Coral Sea Commemorations in 1992, the gardens in Anzac memorial Park were replanted and most of the memorial structures were cleaned and/or repainted. A large Coral Sea Battle Memorial was built to the north of the Centenary Fountain. The memorial commemorates the role of Australian and American servicemen in the Battle of the Coral Sea in 1942. About the same period, a new children's play area was created between the bandstand and the Centenary Fountain.

== Description ==
Anzac Memorial Park extends along the foreshore overlooking Cleveland Bay, with views to Magnetic Island. It is bordered to the west by Tobruk Memorial Baths, to the south by The Strand, to the east by the Townsville Bowls Club, and to the north by reclaimed land forming part of a recent marina development. The park is surrounded by a low concrete edging with obelisk-like pillars at regular intervals. Steel chains stretch between the pillars along the sea front (to the north) only.

There are mature Banyan trees along The Strand boundary, just outside the park reserve, and early garden beds along the street and throughout the park. More recently planted palm trees are scattered throughout the park.

Anzac Memorial Park forms a garden setting for a number of adjacent buildings of cultural heritage significance, including the former Queen's Hotel and former Customs House along The Strand, further up on Wickham Street, the State Government Offices and at the corner of Cleveland Terrace and Melton Terrace, the former Supreme Court Building.

Anzac Memorial Park contains a number of memorial structures. The memorial Bandstand is centrally placed at the eastern end of the park. West of this are newly established gardens and a recent children's playground. In the centre of the park, opposite the main entrance gates to The Strand and Wickham Street, is the 1959 Queensland Centenary Fountain. To the north of the Fountain is a 1992 memorial to the Battle of the Coral Sea. The entrance gates, Fountain and Coral Sea Memorial form a north-south axis which bisects the park. West of the fountain is the First World War Memorial, also centrally located. At the western end of the park is the WJ Castling Memorial, again, centrally positioned. The WJ Castling Memorial, First World War Memorial, Queensland Centenary Fountain, and the Bandstand, form an axis east-west, and each is set in a paved surround within the grassed area of the park's centre.

=== W J Castling Memorial, 1908 ===
The W J Castling memorial drinking fountain is an exercise in the use of classical elements, based on a simple square form plan with an attic storey raised on Ionic columns.

The structure derives from the Roman triumphal arch, with its four columns standing on pedestals and rising to an entablature, above which is the attic storey with a semicircular decorative motif. The arches have been displaced by the capitals, and occur within the structure as a shallow dome above the central urn on its octagonal base.

The curves of a basilica roof are reduced to a convex pyramidal form, topped with a decorative carved finial.

Carved of yellow sandstone, the columns, roof and urn are supported on a plinth and attached column bases of white marble. A basin has been formed in marble on each side of the drinking fountain.

=== Bandstand, 1913 ===
The bandstand is also an exercise in the language of classical architecture, using a simple square form plan with a pyramidal roof raised on composite order columns. The Mannerist composition of the screen derives from the Renaissance illustrations of the classical orders, in which the elements of the entablature surmounting the capital are interpreted as panels of open space between flat pilasters.

The frieze band of the entablature is infilled with decorative cast iron panels, framed between chamfered square section timber posts and visually supported on corner brackets to the underside of the taenia, or plate that separates the frieze from the architrave below.

Panels of decorative cast iron are fixed between columns to form a continuous balustrade, broken only at the top of the steps where it meets round iron posts with ball finials. Paired columns at each corner are infilled with frieze panels above and balustrading below, with curved corner brackets at each junction to form an egg-shaped opening in the screen.

Columns are set on a base of rendered brickwork, set one metre above the surrounding garden beds with rendered steps and curved strings.

Within the bandstand is a recent hardwood boarded floor, and a flat VJ lined ceiling extending beyond the screen of the walls to form boxed eaves stopped at a deep timber fascia.

The roof is sheeted in corrugated galvanised iron, and has a turned timber finial. The structure is finished in a green plastic paint except for the floorboards which are unpainted and the ceiling and finial which are painted off-white. There is no guttering nor rainwater goods, and the original interior light fitting is missing.

=== First World War Memorial, 1923–24 ===
This memorial is a column of rough cut, rusticated grey granite supported on a red-white marble plinth and bracketed by three white marble fins each supported by triple columns on attached bases. The column is finished with a projecting abacus of granite, and is supported on a concrete stylobate of two steps, surfaced in red granite chips.

White marble tablets are fixed to the column between the fins, and high on the column's four faces are inset circular bronze plaques, each sheltered by a narrow bracketed shelf of white marble. The four plaques depict an eagle, crossed swords, anchor, and the seal of the City of Townsville, and replace four clock faces.

=== Queensland Centenary Fountain, 1959 ===
This is a circular fountain approximately 1 metre (3 ft 3 in) high with central sprays. It sits in a shallow pool fed by perimeter sprays set in a low masonry ring.

=== Battle of the Coral Sea Memorial, 1992 ===
Earth is banked in a glacis against two low, outward-sloping walls that form two facing quadrants around a circular paved area.

The walls rise in an arc to a height of about one metre in their centre, and are finished in red granite. The lettering and illustrations that tell the story of the Battle of the Coral Sea are picked out in contrasting rough and smooth finishes on the surfaces of the walls.

Within the paved area are two truncated columns, bearing bronze information plaques.

== Heritage listing ==
Anzac Memorial Park was listed on the Queensland Heritage Register on 21 October 1992 having satisfied the following criteria.

The place is important in demonstrating the evolution or pattern of Queensland's history.

Since the early 20th century, the park has provided a community focus for commemorative activities, and contains a number of memorials to events or persons of significance in Townsville's history, including the WJ Castling Memorial (1908), the Bandstand (1913), the First World War Memorial (1923–24), the Queensland Centenary Fountain (1959) and the Battle of the Coral Sea Memorial (1992).

The First World War Memorial is a member of a class of commemorative structures erected as a record of the local impact of a major historical event and intended to endure, and along with the renaming of the park as Anzac Memorial Park, survives as evidence of a widespread social movement expressing Australian patriotism and nationalism in the interwar period.

The Queensland Centenary Fountain is significant as Townsville City Council's major contribution to the celebration of the centenary of Queensland's separation from New South Wales in 1859.

The adjacent mature Banyan trees are significant as some of the earliest surviving street plantings in Townsville.

The place is important in demonstrating the principal characteristics of a particular class of cultural places.

The WJ Castling Memorial and the Bandstand are finely detailed, classically derived structures that reflect the Mannerism of the Victorian and Edwardian Periods and the tradition of constructing public buildings in a classical style.

The place is important because of its aesthetic significance.

The bandstand in particular is an aesthetically pleasing and skilfully executed composition based on the language of classical architecture. Furthermore, the principal original elements of the composition are intact. The WJ Castling Memorial is significant for its craftsmanship and intactness.

The First World War Memorial is a dominant structure in Anzac Park, and in its aesthetic quality and craftsmanship, makes a significant contribution to the townscape quality of the park.

The place has a strong or special association with a particular community or cultural group for social, cultural or spiritual reasons.

The establishment of the park was closely connected with civic leader and publican John Henry Tyack and the re-development of the Queens Hotel opposite, and for the first half of the 20th century, remained one of Townsville's principal tourist attractions.

The place has a special association with the life or work of a particular person, group or organisation of importance in Queensland's history.

Anzac Memorial Park are important for their association with The Strand and Cleveland Bay foreshore as one of the earliest recreation venues in Townsville.

Since the early 20th century, the park has provided a community focus for commemorative activities, and contains a number of memorials to events or persons of significance in Townsville's history, including the WJ Castling Memorial (1908), the Bandstand (1913), the First World War Memorial (1923–24), the Queensland Centenary Fountain (1959) and the Battle of the Coral Sea Memorial (1992).
