= Albert Edmund Bates =

Albert Edmund Bates (1862—1929) was an Australian architect. Many of his works are notable; some are heritage-listed.

== Early life ==
Albert Bates was born on 30 May 1862 in New Zealand, the son of John Edmund and Mary Bates.

== Architectural career ==
Albert Bates formed a partnership with George Thomas Eaton in Rockhampton c. 1894 and developed a successful Central Queensland practice in the late 19th century, with branch offices established at Mount Morgan and Longreach by 1898, Clermont in 1900, Gladstone in 1901, Maryborough in 1902, and Townsville by 1902. Arthur Beckford Polin of Sydney joined the partnership in Townsville c. 1901, as Eaton, Bates & Polin. After 1902 their head office was moved to Brisbane, with branches retained at Rockhampton and Townsville. A branch operated briefly at Toowoomba in the early 1900s. They undertook a wide variety of architectural work, from hotels and commercial buildings to residences, hospitals and masonic halls, and received a number of commissions from the Catholic Church – churches, schools, convents and presbyteries. One of their most glamorous commissions was for the new Queen's Hotel in Townsville (1901–04). Cremorne at Hamilton in Brisbane (1905–06) was one of their larger residential designs. Their style was eclectic, drawing upon both eastern and western classical traditions, with a particular emphasis on verandahs and pavilions – both as a decorative device and as appropriate to the warm Queensland climate.

Bates came to Sydney in 1905 and practised regularly up to the time of his final illness. He was a member of the Institute of Architects.

== Works ==
Works attributed to Eaton & Bates include:

- Queen's Hotel, Townsville (1901–1904)
- Exchange Hotel, Laidley
- Cremorne, a villa at Hamilton (1905–1906)

Works attributed to Eaton, Bates & Polin include:

- Henlein & Co, commercial premises in Townsville (1901–1902)
- Imperial Hotel in Ravenswood (1900–1901)

Among his New South Wales works were:

- Somerset House, Martin-place, Sydney
- St Augustine's Church, Balmain
- St Mary's Church, Grafton,
- Council Chambers, North Sydney
- Hughes Motor Service building, Phillip-street, Sydney
- Checker Cab building
- St Brigid's Church, Coogee
- St Mary's church, Concord

== Later life ==
Albert Bates died in Sydney on Wednesday 24 July 1929 aged 62 years. His funeral took place in the Church of England section of the Northern Suburbs Cemetery on Friday 26 July 1929.
