= The Strand, Townsville =

Seaside foreshore in Townsville, Australia

Coordinates: 19°14′45″S 146°48′40″E

The Strand
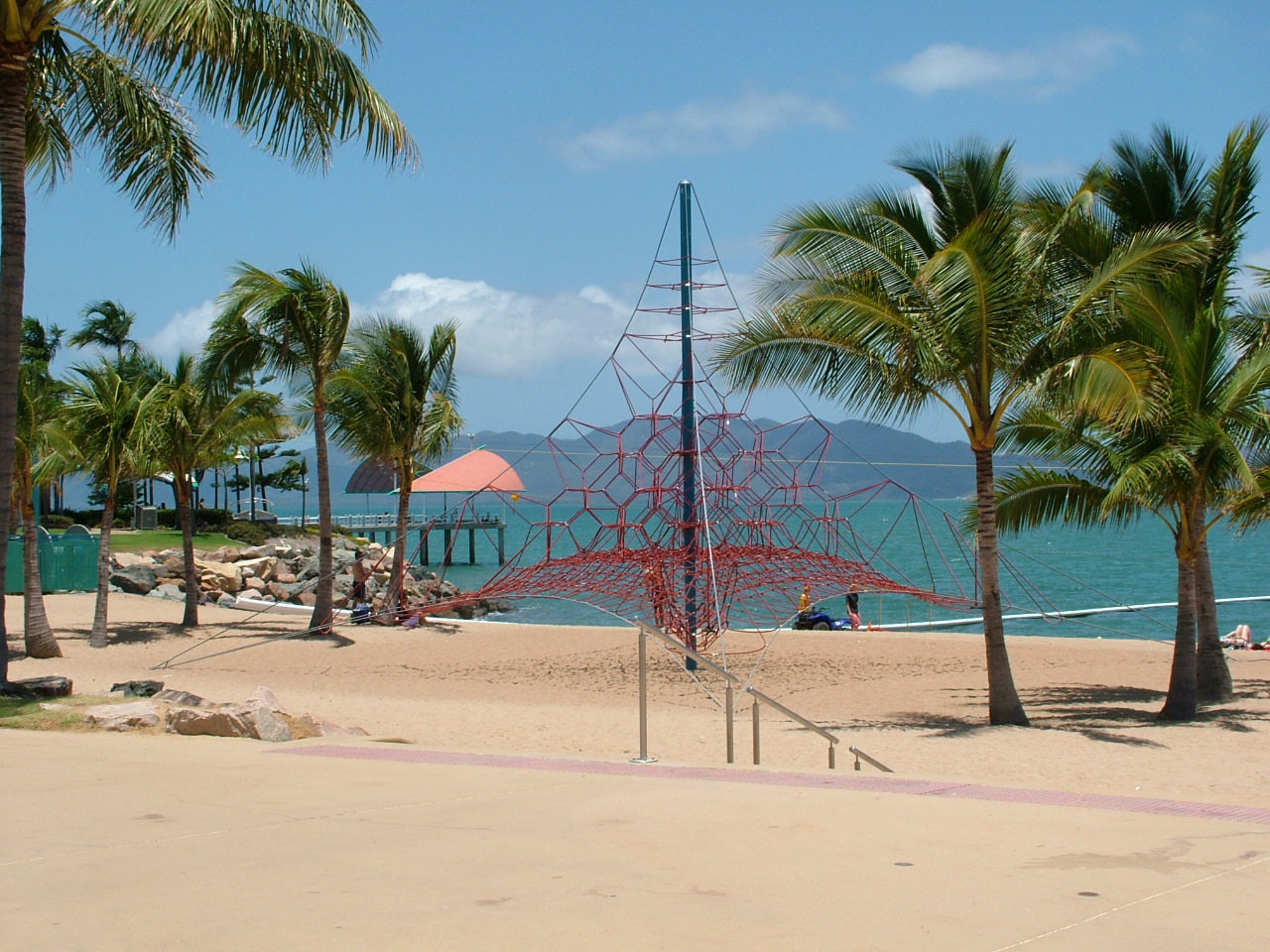
- The Strand Seaside
- Interactive map of The Strand
- Location: Queensland, Australia
- Nearest city: Townsville
- Opened: October 1999
- Operator: Townsville City Council
- Open: 24 hours
- Status: Open all year
- Public transit: Bus and ferry

The Strand is a seaside foreshore located in Townsville, Australia. It is located in the suburb of North Ward. The Strand has a view of the Port of Townsville and Magnetic Island, as well as to Cape Cleveland. Features in the area include a jetty, a recreational park, restaurants, cafes and pools.

== History ==
The Strand has been a part of Townsville's history since the city was founded in the mid-19th century.

A public outdoor swimming baths were first constructed between 1886 and 1889. About 6–8 feet (1.8–2.4 m) deep, it was filled daily by tidal actions. The later 'City Baths' were established on the site. New baths were built between 1941 and 1950. These were named the 'Tobruk Memorial Baths' in memory of those at the 1941 Siege of Tobruk.

In 1891, military fortifications were established at Kissing Point, a rocky headland at the north-west end of the Strand. Jezzine Barracks was closed in 2007, to become the home of the Army Museum of North Queensland.

By 1929, a branch of the Queensland Country Women's Association built the Pioneer Women's Memorial Building with five seaside huts on Mitchell Street, Kissing Point. This included a 'sharkproof' enclosure for swimming, which required repair from time to time.

A number of persons were killed by sharks over the years on The Strand. The first recorded fatality was on 9 November 1916 at Kissing Point, and another followed the next morning nearby. September 1918 saw another fatal attack near the Sea View Hotel, in 30 inches (760 mm) of water. A fourth fatality was about 200 yards (180 m) from Kissing Point in January 1933. Another reported fatal mauling was located beside the Kissing Point Baths swimming enclosure on 22 October 1951.

In July 1935 it was believed a forty-three-year-old woman with a child walked off the Melton Hill cliff, over 81 feet (25 m) high, opposite the City Baths. (Even then, the cliff had Bougainvillea creepers.)

By 1951, the Kissing Point swimming enclosure was also known as the RAAF Pool when netting was erected during World War II when the Royal Australian Air Force station was a naval area.

Jellyfish stings have also been present along the beach over time.

In January 1956, a twenty-seven-year-old stockman pleaded guilty for the murder of a twelve-year-old female school student. She had been attacked and strangled at Kissing Point in December 1955. The offender died in prison in April 2010, and considered to have spent more time in custody than anyone else in Queensland.

The current foreshore was opened in 1999 after the old foreshore was severely damaged and eroded after heavy rainfall and wind from Tropical Cyclone Sid in January 1998 and other monsoonal storms between 1997 and 1998. It was moderately damaged by Cyclone Tessi in April 2000.

The Strand was the 'cauldron stop' for Townsville, during the Australian leg of the 2000 Sydney Olympics Torch Relay.

The Strand held the 2001 Centenary of Federation events, including a fireworks display and skyshow which attracted a crowd of around 86,000.

The Strand was named Australia's cleanest Beach in 2008. This was the second time the award was given to the beach in five years.

An Anzac Day march in 2009 attracted 20,000 people to The Strand.

In 2010, A$35 million was spent on redeveloping the foreshore. An estimated 80,000 people turned out on the opening weekend, which included numerous events including a pyrotechnics and fireworks display, and a skyshow.

== Features ==
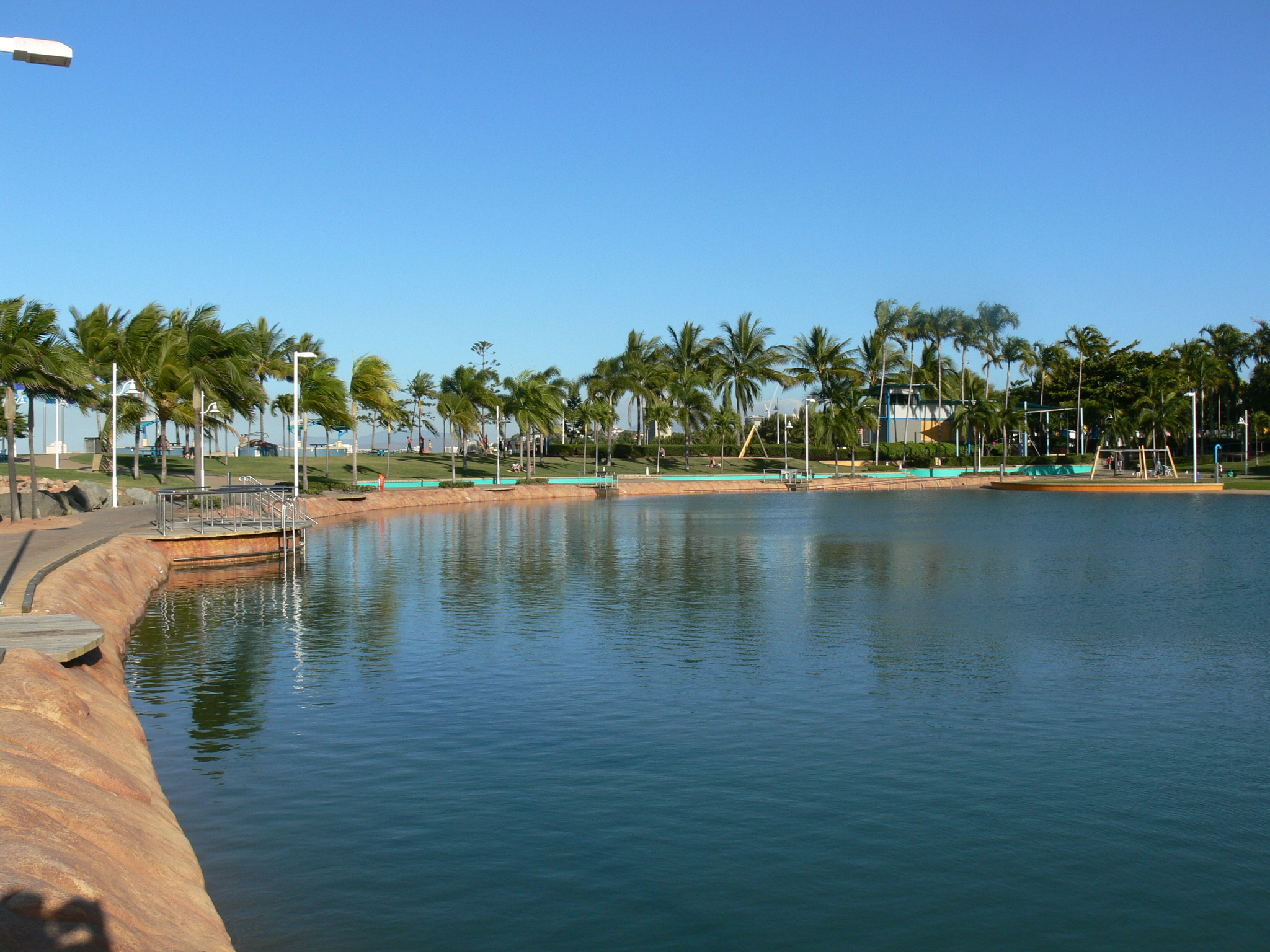
The Rockpool is a salt water lagoon at the Strand

Anzac Memorial Park began as The Strand Park in the 1910s as a place for the residents of Townsville to visit and enjoy. In September 1913, a bandstand, designed by Sydney architect A.B. Polin, was officially opened by the Mayor, Alderman R.W. McLelland, and dedicated to the memory of the late Alderman J.H. Tyack. The park was progressively expanded and developed and from the 1920s became a focus for the city's ANZAC Day activities. Reflective of this important use, the park was formally renamed the ANZAC Memorial Park in 1934.

The Telecasters North Queensland Building was previously the Queens Hotel. This building was built in stages between 1902 and the 1920s by publican John Tyack, to the design of prominent architectural firm Eaton, Bates and Polin. The hotel soon acquired a reputation as being one of the finest hotels in North Queensland.

The Tobruk Memorial Baths were built between 1941 and 1950, with early construction slowed as a result of the Second World War. The Baths were designed and built by the Townsville City Council's engineering and works department and named the Tobruk Memorial Baths in honour of the Australian servicemen who had taken part in the Siege of Tobruk.

Other recreational features include:

- Oceanway pavement
- Rockpool
- Barbecue areas
- Surf Lifesaving Club
- Strand Park
- Waterpark
- Ocean Siren, a water sculpture by Jason deCaires Taylor modelled on twelve-year-old indigenous Wulgurukaba girl Takoda Johnson, which changes colour based on the water temperature measured nearby

== Events ==
Since the opening of the Strand, the foreshore has been used for many annual or monthly events. The fourth Friday of each month sees Strand Park used for Nightmarkets, which is a popular festivity among the local residents. Other events include the annual Townsville City Council Run Christmas events, Carols by Candlelight and Stable on the Strand, as well as a fireworks display and gathering on New Year's Eve. One example of a bi-annual event is the Strand Ephemera, wherein local and regional artists display their works along the foreshore. Some works from this event have become permanent on the foreshore, including the Silver Coconuts near the Rock Pool.
