= G Wyman Building =

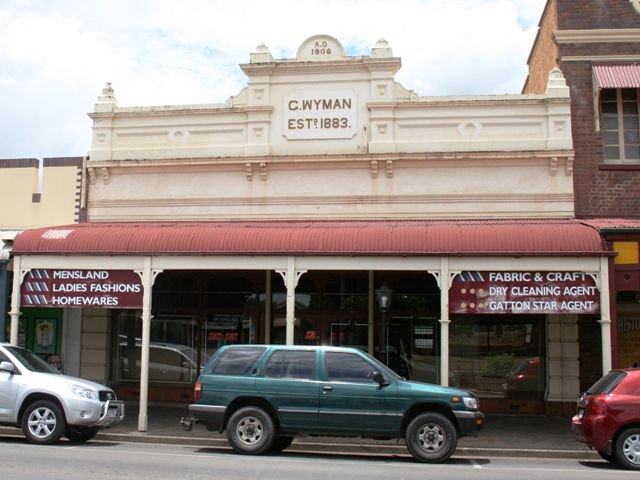
- G Wyman Building, 2009

- Location within Queensland Location within Australia
- 27.63°S 152.3944°E
- Location: 140–142 Patrick Street, Laidley, Lockyer Valley Region, Queensland, Australia

History
- Design period: 1900–1914 (early 20th century)
- Built: 1906

Queensland Heritage Register
- Official name: G Wyman Building
- Type: state heritage (built)
- Designated: 21 October 1992
- Reference no.: 600654
- Significant period: 1900s (fabric); 1906–ongoing (historical use as a shop)
- Significant components: furniture/fittings

G Wyman Building is a heritage-listed shopping centre at 140–142 Patrick Street, Laidley, Lockyer Valley Region, Queensland, Australia. It was built in 1906. It was added to the Queensland Heritage Register on 21 October 1992.

== History ==
The G Wyman Building is a two-storey brick building with an iron awning extending across the footpath, supported on timber posts. The building was constructed in 1906 during a period of economic prosperity in Laidley and it was the second building that George Wyman had constructed on the site, replacing a former timber structure established in 1883. The architect of the building is unknown.

At the turn of the century, the Lockyer Valley was one of the most prosperous agricultural districts in Queensland, and this prosperity was reflected in the flurry of building activity in Laidley which saw the town nearly double in size, and many of the earlier timber buildings were replaced with substantial brick buildings. These included the new Exchange Hotel in c. 1902, Neilson's new Central Hall (1902), the new Geismann's buildings (1902), Whitehouse's Bakery in 1904, as well as Wyman's new store in 1906. As the principal town in the Lockyer district, Laidley was granted its own town council, distinct from Laidley Shire Council, in 1902.

George Wyman was a prosperous and active member of the community at Laidley. Born in Middlesex, England, his parents emigrated to Australia while he was still an infant. He learned the grocery business while employed by Cribb & Foote at Ipswich, and owned a business there for several years. His brother, Henry, was a noted Ipswich architect who served as Mayor of Ipswich between 1894 and 1896.

George Wyman established himself at Laidley in 1883. Here he was very successful and married Ruth White, the daughter of Mr B White of Laidley, producing one son and two daughters. Ruth and George acquired adjoining blocks of land in Patrick Street, Laidley in 1884. The land was adjacent to the Exchange Hotel and handily situated in relation to the railway line. In February 1884 the previous owner of George's block, Mr R Little, had taken out a mortgage on his land for £900, possibly to develop the land for commercial purposes. There is no record of a mortgage against the property during Wyman's occupation of the site. The adjacent block appears to have been gifted to the newly-weds in Ruth's name by her father, Benjamin White.

Here George carried on his business for many years in a timber building, taking an active role in the social life of Laidley. Newspaper reports indicate he was involved in many of the activities of Laidley, and his wife acted as hostess to social evenings in their home. The 1890 Post Office Directory lists George as produce merchant, grocer, general storekeeper and draper, as well as being Hon. Secretary of the Laidley Agricultural Society and President of the Laidley Cricket Club. In addition he served his community as a justice of the peace. In 1902 George was elected Mayor of the first Laidley Town Council in which capacity he served for twelve months. In August 1906, Wyman purchased 29 hundredths of a perch from Heinrich Geismann, proprietor of the neighbouring Exchange Hotel, for the purpose of constructing a party wall. This transaction marks the construction of his new, brick store which encompassed each of the blocks owned by his wife and himself. The timber from the demolished timber structure was used in the construction of a house at 22 Railway Street, Laidley. By 1907 Wyman also had a store in nearby Forest Hill which was eventually sold to Tom Waller in 1927.

In 1911 George Wyman died and his property passed in trust to his widow and his daughter, Ada Ruth. The property remained in trust, passing in turn to other descendants until 1971 when Wyman's Pty Ltd became the owners. At the time of George Wyman's death his son Charles took over running the business. Wyman's Store had traditionally sold groceries, hardware, ironmongery, clothing and dressmaking and hat-making services and at this time it opened a petrol depot with the rise the motor cars. During the beginning of the 20th century Wyman's employed 22 shop staff including trained drapers and milliners.

In 1939 Charles Wyman died and the business was leased to Mr W Blake until Charles' son Trevor took charge of the business in 1950. At this time the sale of general goods was not economically viable and the Wyman's began to specialise more in drapery and millinery.

Another store was opened in Gatton in 1958 and Trevor's son David started in that store in 1964 and his other son Ross started in the Laidley store in 1971. David and Ross Wyman continue to run each store today.

The store remains remarkably intact. One major change which has occurred was the removal of the mezzanine floor at the rear of the store which housed the former millinery section. Along with this a large "flying-fox" winch device used to move goods around the store was also removed in the latter 20th century.

In 2009 the building was sold and became a second hand store until 2012 when the owners left the building. It remained empty until 2022 when a new store bought the building, and is now called "Toy Wiz", a hobby store.

== Description ==
Wyman's former clothing store is located on the eastern side of Patrick Street in Laidley in a precinct of late nineteenth and early twentieth century buildings in the centre of Laidley. It is a single storey, brick building with a decorative rendered, masonry parapet and an iron bullnosed awning extending over the footpath supported by timber posts with decorative capitals and brackets. Below the awning, the front elevation has large glass display windows framed in timber which flank a central entrance way from the footpath.

Above the awning a rendered parapet rises above the roof line displaying the inscription in relief, "G. Wyman Estd. 1883", and above on a semi-circular pediment, "A.D. 1906". The parapet is part of a continuous line of masonry facades which run along this part of Patrick Street presenting a coherent streetscape.

The interior of the store displays many of the original features in a large open-planned space. These include high coffered ceilings with diagonal boarding and ceiling roses, numerous chamfered timber columns with capitals and decorative cast iron vents in the walls. Most notable is the original timber service counter which stands free in the centre of the store. The counter is a large square with space in the middle for attendants. The counter features diagonal boarding and decorative pilasters and wide bench space.

There is a small partitioned office in the north-east corner of the store and some fitting rooms on the south east corner. The floor is covered with linoleum and the walls are still face brick painted white. There is evidence of former window openings on the northern wall which have been enclosed.

== Heritage listing ==
G Wyman Building was listed on the Queensland Heritage Register on 21 October 1992 having satisfied the following criteria.

The place is important in demonstrating the evolution or pattern of Queensland's history.

Wymans Store is important in demonstrating the pattern of Queensland's history as it is a good representative of the important role of the country general store in providing services in rural communities. Its construction around 1906 also reflects a period of renewed building activity and economic solidification in the town of Laidley, a trend common in many rural towns in Queensland at the time.

The place is important in demonstrating the principal characteristics of a particular class of cultural places.

The place is a good and intact example of a large country general store providing necessary services to a rural community. Its open plan design, large shop front windows and original central service counter all contribute highly to its identity as an early-20th-century store.

The place is important because of its aesthetic significance.

The place has high aesthetic value as it contributes strongly to the streetscape of Patrick Street in Laidley. It displays typical design and decorative features of its type which add to the aesthetic significance of the building.

The place has a strong or special association with a particular community or cultural group for social, cultural or spiritual reasons.

It also has special association with the community of Laidley as a local landmark which contributes greatly to their townscape and as a continuing place of service for over a century.

The place has a special association with the life or work of a particular person, group or organisation of importance in Queensland's history.

The place has a special association with the life and work of Mr G Wyman, Mayor of the first Laidley Town Council when Laidley became a separate local government area, as well as three subsequent generations of his family who continue to run the store today.
