= Stable on the Strand =

Nativity play in Australia

Coordinates: 19°14′45″S 146°48′40″E

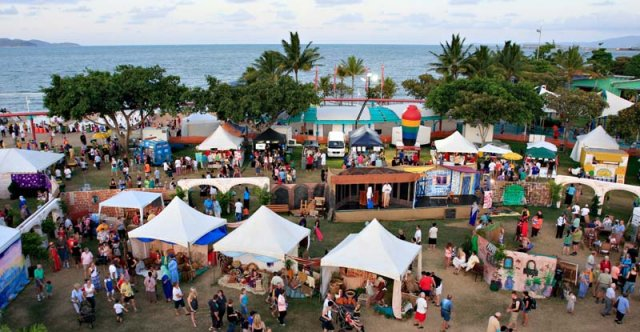
Stable Village - Elevated view

The Stable (formerly known as Stable on the Strand) is an annual nativity play in Townsville, Queensland, Australia. It has been described as "part installation, part fun fair and part theatrical performance".

The play is staged from 18 to 22 December on The Strand in Townsville. The festivities also include a mock Bethlehem with actors playing soldier, shepherds and the Holy Family The event attracts up to 40,000 visitors a year.

== History ==
=== 1999 ===
The Stable was created in the Mount Louisa youth center in 1999 by Jay Goodwin and Anne Harley, and was attended by 120 people on the opening night.

=== 2002 ===
The Stable moved to the Strand and acquired the name 'The Stable on the Strand'. The original baby Jesus was played by Lachlan Crossan.

=== 2020 ===
During the COVID-19 pandemic, Stable on the Stand changed to incorporate 'stations' around Townsville that people would drive past. This was also helped by the creation of the event-specific Star Chase app, which showcased the locations of the Stable on the Strand 'station' displays and local light displays for people to create their own driving tours of the attractions.

=== 2021 ===
Stable on the Strand relocated to Riverway to explore the opportunity a different location provides when reaching their audience.

=== 2022 ===
The Stable on the Strand changed its name to The Stable. The Stable organized a hybrid event in Townsville featuring "Stable on the Streets" displays, where community members registered Christmas displays shown on an interactive map. The event included "Stable at Riverway" from 18–22 December, featuring live actors, scenes, costumes, animals, family activities, entertainment, food options, and a youth area.

== The story ==
The play is an interactive re-creation of the traditional Christmas story, and it involves up to 1,000 volunteers per year. In 2002, it was awarded the honour of Townsville's Event of the Year.

== Features ==
Live At The Strand right on the beach

- The Stable Village - vendors and actors in costume
- Hospitality Areas - food and beverages
- Stable on the Streets - Christmas lights displays around Townsville
- Stable at Riverway - The story of Christmas with live actors, realistic scenes, costumes, animals and activities.
