= Exchange Hotel, Laidley =

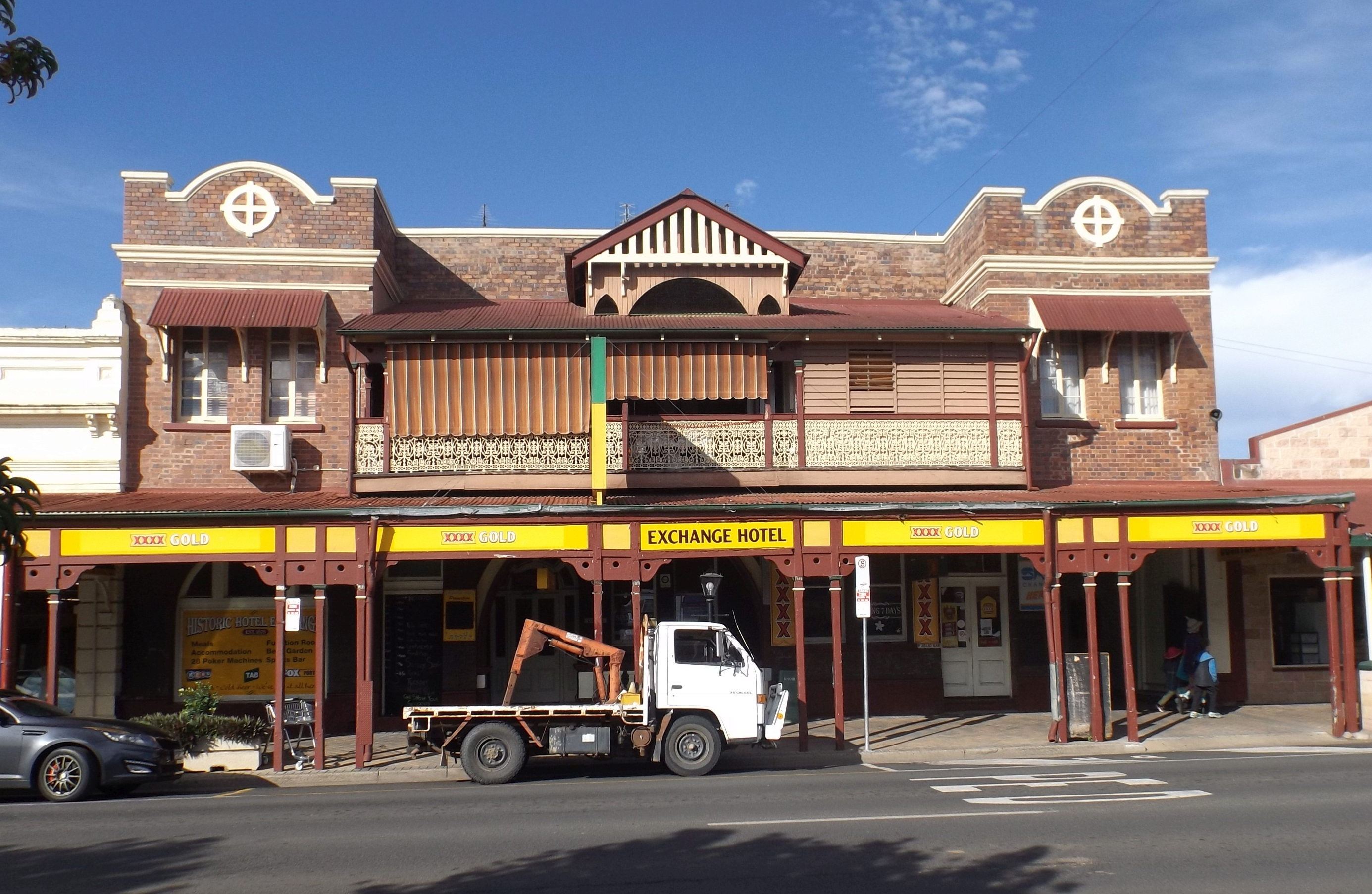
- Front, 2015

- Location within Queensland Location within Australia
- 27.6303°S 152.3944°E
- Location: 134–138 Patrick Street, Laidley, Lockyer Valley Region, Queensland, Australia

History
- Design period: 1900–1914 (early 20th century)
- Built: 1902

Site notes
- Architect: Eaton & Bates

Queensland Heritage Register
- Official name: Exchange Hotel
- Type: state heritage (built)
- Designated: 21 October 1992
- Reference no.: 600653
- Significant period: 1900s (fabric); 1902–ongoing (historical use as hotel); 1902–1956 (historical use as bank office)

Exchange Hotel is a heritage-listed hotel at 134–138 Patrick Street, Laidley, Lockyer Valley Region, Queensland, Australia. It was designed by Eaton & Bates and built in 1902. It was added to the Queensland Heritage Register on 21 October 1992.

== History ==
The Exchange Hotel at Laidley, a two-storeyed brick building, was constructed in 1902 for publicans Julius and Hansine Jocumsen, and replaced an earlier hotel of the same name on the site. It was erected during one of the most significant growth periods in Laidley's history, and although modest in size and scale, reflects in style and materials the confidence and optimism of a small, prosperous, turn-of-the-century country town.

Laidley was established in the 1850s as a transport stop along the main dray route from Brisbane and Ipswich to Toowoomba and the Darling Downs, and following the late 1850s subdivision of the Lockyer Creek floodplains, developed as the centre of a small agricultural district. A village of Laidley, located on the rise just south of the present town, was surveyed in 1858. In the mid-1860s the Southern and Western Railway was constructed about a mile to the north of the village, at which time a second survey of Laidley town blocks, this time near the proposed railway station, was undertaken in 1865. A small township developed around Laidley station during the construction of the railway, but after the gangers moved on or took up farms in the district in the late 1860s, this township consisted of little but the two-storeyed iron station building, and Laidley village to the south remained the principal town.

From the mid-1870s, however, the area around the Laidley railway station gradually became the focus of an expanding and increasingly prosperous agricultural district, and by the early 1890s had a population of over 600. The first Exchange Hotel, a single-storeyed timber building erected c.1876 for local farmer and storekeeper Frederick Chambers, was one of the earliest buildings in the relocated town. Chambers acquired title to the site in October 1877, and the property was retained by him, and later his wife Mary, until it was transferred to the Royal Bank of Queensland Ltd in 1895. In February 1896, title passed to Laidley storekeeper, produce merchant and publican August Giesemann, and then in early 1900 to Hansine Jocumsen, who had acquired the license in 1898.

From 1 December 1901, publican William Bergland, formerly a supervisor at Peter Murphy's Transcontinental Hotel in Brisbane, took out a 10 year lease of the Exchange, Laidley's oldest hotel, and paid £1,100 for the goodwill and furniture. When reporting this on 28 November 1901, the Queensland Times also commented that: "It is Mr Jocumsen's intention to erect a large brick building in the near future, the present structure being decidedly out of keeping with the increase of business".

At the turn of the century, the Lockyer Valley was one of the most prosperous agricultural districts in Queensland, and this prosperity was reflected in a flurry of building activity in Laidley, which saw the town nearly double in size, and many of the earlier timber structures replaced with substantial brick buildings. These included the new Exchange Hotel (1902), Nielson's new Central Hall (1902), the new Giesemann's buildings (1902), Whitehouse's Bakery (c. 1904), and Wyman's new store (1906). As the principal town in the Lockyer district, Laidley was granted its own town council, distinct from Laidley Shire Council, in 1902.

In March–April 1902, architects Eaton & Bates, with offices in Brisbane, Rockhampton, Mount Morgan, Longreach, Clermont, Gladstone, Maryborough and Townsville, called tenders for the erection of a two-storeyed brick hotel at Laidley for Mrs Hansen (sic) Jocumsen. Eaton and Bates were experienced designers of rural hotels, including the Normanby at Rockhampton (1890s), the Great Western and Imperial hotels at Longreach (both erected 1898–99), the Royal Hotel at Maryborough (1901), and the famous Queen's Hotel at Townsville, the first two stages of which were erected 1902–04.

In May 1902 Mrs Jocumsen raised a £2,000 mortgage on the property, and it is likely that this financed the construction of the new Exchange Hotel. The building was close to completion by late September 1902, and was finished by late November that year, when Bergland re-negotiated his lease on the new building.

When completed, the Royal Bank of Queensland, which had opened a Laidley branch north of the railway line c. 1890, occupied premises on the ground floor of the new hotel. The Royal Bank had been established in Brisbane in 1885 as a competitor to the enormously successful Queensland National Bank, and was the second bank to open an office in Laidley, the first being the QNB on 16 July 1886. These were still the only banking institutions in Laidley in 1902 when the new Exchange Hotel was erected. The branch office in the Exchange Hotel became an office of the Bank of Queensland following the merger of the Royal Bank and the Bank of North Queensland (established in Townsville in 1888) in 1917. In 1922, the Bank of Queensland was taken over by the National Bank of Australasia, and the Exchange Hotel office again changed name. The National Bank maintained its Laidley branch office in this building until 1956.

Between 1904 and 1924 the hotel was owned by the Giesemann family, who let the business to a number of lessees. In August 1924, the property was transferred to James King of Laidley, who bought the Exchange following the destruction by fire of his own Laidley hotel, the Empire, that year. The Empire was almost opposite the Exchange, and the latter received some fire damage to the front facade. Until 1950, the Exchange remained the property of the King family, who also ran the hotel until 1949, but there have been a number of owners and even more lessees since.

== Description ==
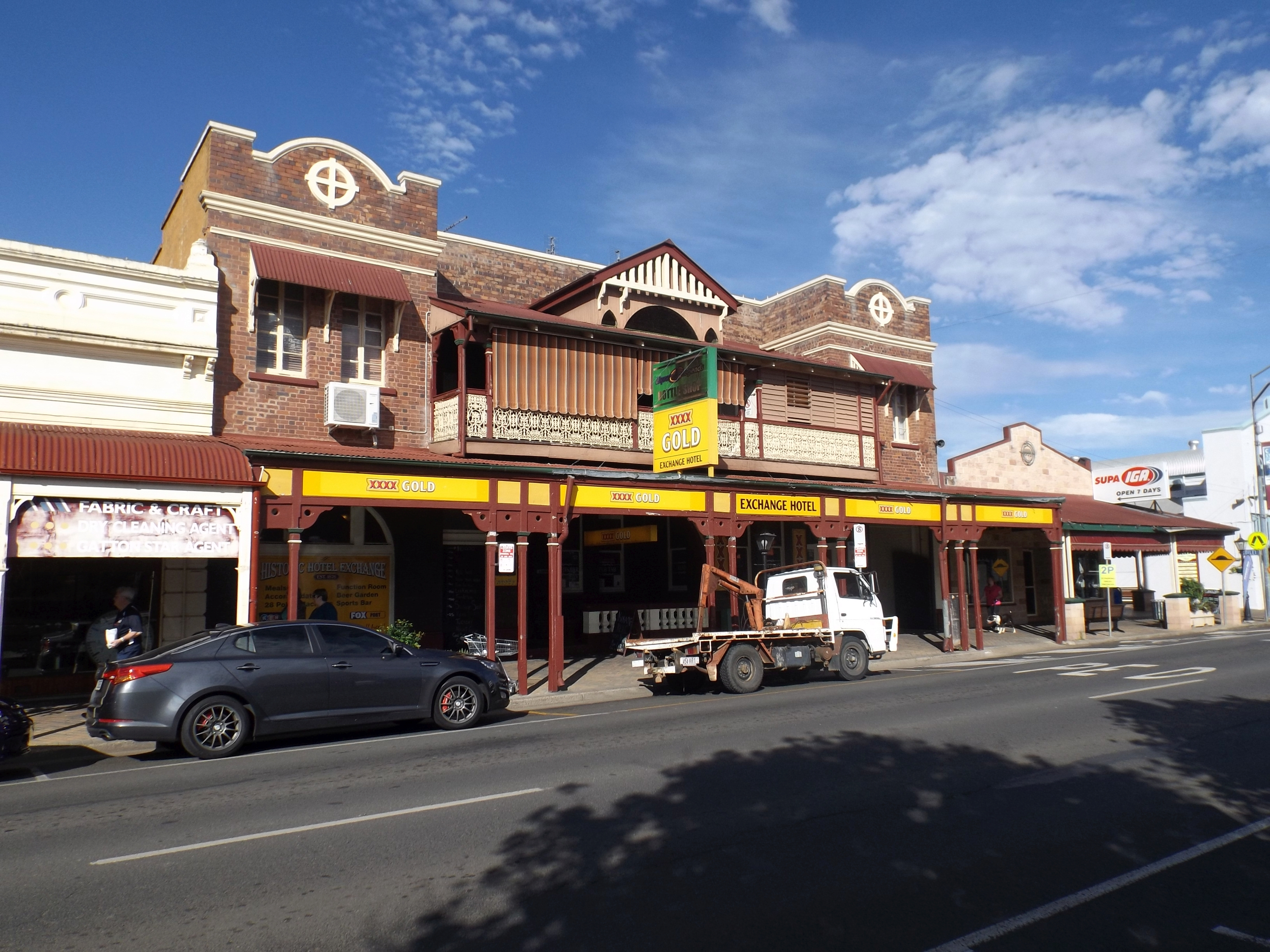
Hotel and Patrick Street in 2015

The Exchange Hotel, a two-storeyed brick building with corrugated iron skillion roofs concealed behind parapet walls, is located fronting Patrick Street, the main street of Laidley, to the west. The building has been built to the property alignment on the north, west and south, and has a T-shaped plan with a long projecting central wing to the rear.

The street elevation is constructed of Flemish bond brickwork and has a wide awning to the ground floor and a semi-recessed verandah to the mid-section of the first floor. The verandah has a raised central gable section, with timber battens to the gable and arched timber valance, over a corrugated iron skillion awning. The verandah has paired timber posts with curved timber brackets, timber louvres enclosing the southern end, and cast iron balustrades. Opening onto this verandah are french doors with fanlights from bedrooms, and a central arched timber door, sidelights and fanlight assembly from a main hall. Either side of the semi-recessed verandah are projecting brick bays housing paired casement windows with timber and iron hoods, and surmounted by arched parapets with rendered cornice details and circle motif.

The corrugated iron skillion awning to the ground floor has paired timber posts to the central section, with triple timber posts either side, curved timber brackets and a solid valance for signage. The main entry is via a large arch to the north side of centre which accesses a recessed entry porch with a tiled floor, concrete balustrade and arched timber door, sidelights and fanlight assembly. The public bar is accessed via a timber and glass door with fanlight at the south, and a separate entrance to the lounge area is located to the north. The building has sash windows with arched headers, and the street facade has rendered details including sills, main entry arch and balustrade, and a deep skirting base. The first floor bridges a driveway on the south side of the building which services the rear of the property. The brick wall facing the driveway is painted, as is the single-storeyed brick annex containing toilets and storage areas at the rear.

The central rear wing, constructed of english garden wall bond brickwork, has had a number of alterations including bricked-in openings and exhaust ducting. Small verandahs are located at the rear of the front section on the north and south. The south verandah has been enclosed, and the north has a timber stair and french doors with fanlights opening from bedrooms.

Internally, the ground floor has a central hall leading to the rear dining and kitchen area, a public bar on the south and a lounge on the north. The building has rendered walls, boarded ceilings, and a timber staircase with turned balustrade and newel posts. The public bar and kitchen have been recently refitted, and the lounge and dining area have undergone earlier alterations.

The first floor has a wide central hall leading to the west verandah, and accommodates bedrooms to the front section of the building and a private residence in the rear central wing. Walls are of single-skin vertically jointed boards, ceilings are boarded and doors are panelled with fanlights.

The northern boundary wall is reported to have been over the southern wall of the adjoining property, which had been built slightly over the property boundary.

== Heritage listing ==
Exchange Hotel was listed on the Queensland Heritage Register on 21 October 1992 having satisfied the following criteria.

The place is important in demonstrating the evolution or pattern of Queensland's history.

The Exchange Hotel was constructed in 1902 during one of the most significant growth periods in Laidley's history, and reflects in style and materials the confidence and optimism of one of Queensland's most prosperous, turn-of-the-century country towns.

The place is important in demonstrating the principal characteristics of a particular class of cultural places.

It survives as a substantially intact example of the work of respected Queensland architects Eaton & Bates, in rural hotel design. The building is significant also for the retention of evidence of the former banking office located within the hotel.

The place is important because of its aesthetic significance.

The Exchange Hotel, possessing a finely articulated street elevation consisting of recessed and projecting awnings, bays, entrances and verandah, is the dominant member of a group of masonry commercial buildings constructed in Laidley at the turn of the century.
