= Henlein & Co Building =

Henlein & Co building
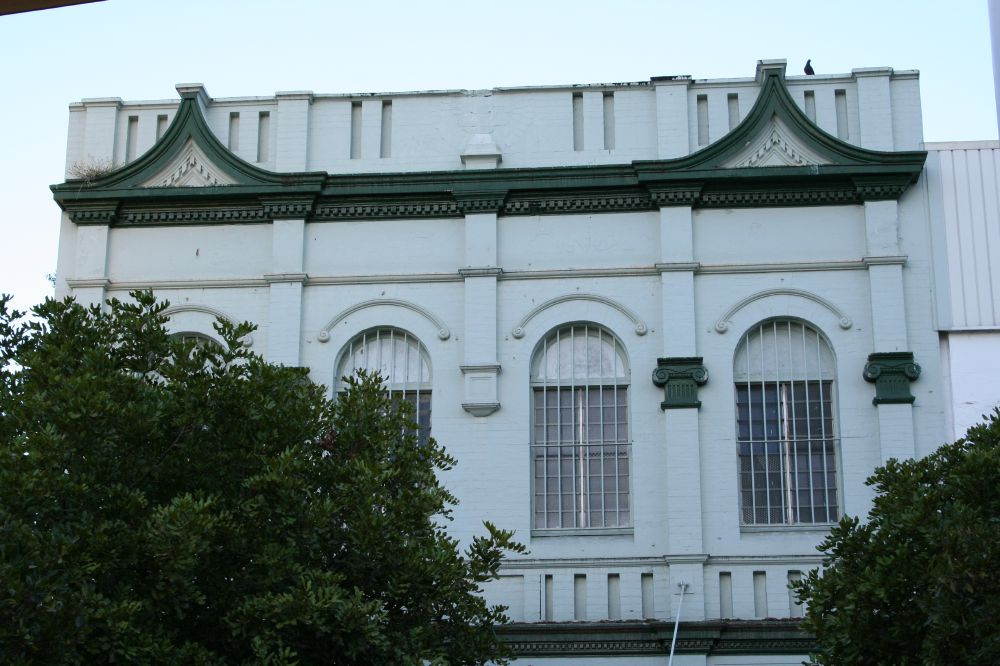
- Henlein & Co Building, 2006

- Location within Queensland Location within Australia
- 19.2613°S 146.8161°E
- Location: 408–410 Flinders Street, Townsville CBD, City of Townsville, Queensland, Australia

History
- Design period: 1900–1914 (early 20th century)
- Built: 1901–1902

Site notes
- Architect: Eaton, Bates & Polin

Queensland Heritage Register
- Official name: Henlein & Co (Best & Less)
- Type: state heritage (built)
- Designated: 21 October 1992
- Reference no.: 600907
- Significant period: 1900s (fabric); 1902–ongoing (historical commercial use); 1925–1930s (bank use)
- Significant components: basement / sub-floor
- Builders: Thomas Page

Henlein & Co is a heritage-listed commercial building at 408–410 Flinders Street, Townsville CBD, City of Townsville, Queensland, Australia. It was designed by Eaton, Bates & Polin and built from 1901 to 1902 by Thomas Page. It was also known as Best & Less. It was added to the Queensland Heritage Register on 21 October 1992.

== History ==
By 1901 the commercial section of Townsville had spread along Flinders Street to the west past the old railway station. Commercial developers such as Henry Abbott were taking advantage of this growth. In September of that year he commissioned Queensland architects Eaton, Bates & Polin to design a combined commercial and warehouse facility which was built by Townsville builder Thomas Page.

Henlein & Co, well established local wine and spirits merchants and Townsville representatives for West End Beer (Brisbane), were the first tenants. They commenced business in 1902 and traded there for thirty one years. The English, Scottish and Australian Bank bought the premises in 1925 and were joint tenants with Henlein & Co for at least six years, but were no longer trading there in 1933.

The Bank sold the building to Carfoots Pty Ltd in 1954, who became Townsville's leading retailer of household furnishings, such as carpet, linen and curtaining. In 1976 Best & Less purchased the building and traded from there for some years. In 2016, it is occupied by a discount store.

== Description ==
This two storey commercial building with a basement was built during the Federation period with load-bearing brick external walls and timber internal columns. The Flinders Street facade was dressed with cement and decorated with arched windows, pilasters, string courses, pediments and cornices. The building was surrounded by a decorative slit parapet on all external walls. The centrally placed entrance was emphasised by an arched opening. Modern aluminium windows and a cantilevered awning are now dominant features of the lower level facade.

== Heritage listing ==
The former Henlein & Company Building was listed on the Queensland Heritage Register on 21 October 1992 having satisfied the following criteria.

The place is important in demonstrating the evolution or pattern of Queensland's history.

Henlein & Co, a commercial building of the Federation era, was a simply designed structure which incorporated the use of traditional materials in a different together with some conventional decorative motifs. The Townsville railway station and the Customs House, are other local buildings which exhibit some of these features. However, few examples of privately owned commercial buildings of this type are left in the city.

While the Henlein building has lost much of its distinctive decoration, it contributes significantly and attractively to the streetscape, together with the nearby Australian Mutual Provident Society Building.

The place demonstrates rare, uncommon or endangered aspects of Queensland's cultural heritage.

Henlein & Co, a commercial building of the Federation era, was a simply designed structure which incorporated the use of traditional materials in a different together with some conventional decorative motifs. The Railway Station and the Customs House, are other local buildings which exhibit some of these features. However, few examples of privately owned commercial buildings of this type are left in the city.

The place is important because of its aesthetic significance.

While the Henlein building has lost much of its distinctive decoration, it contributes significantly and attractively to the streetscape, together with the nearby Australian Mutual Provident Society Building.
