= Arthur Beckford Polin =

Australian architect

Arthur Polin
- Born: Arthur Beckford Polin; 30 April 1872; Newcastle, New South Wales
- Died: 21 September 1961; Randwick, New South Wales
- Occupation: Architect
- Parent(s): Elizabeth Rook and Peter Aloysius Polin

Arthur Beckford Polin (23 April 1872 - 21 September 1961) was an Australian architect who practiced in New South Wales and Queensland.

== Birth and education ==
Polin was born in Newcastle, New South Wales the first son of Elizabeth Rook and Peter Aloysius Polin. He grew up in Coonamble and was educated at Saint Ignatius' College, Riverview, in Sydney. Following school he served his articles with Messrs Tappin and Dennehy, well known ecclesiastical architects. Following study at Sydney Technical College he was employed by John Kirkpatrick, eminent city architect.

== Architectural career ==
Early in his career Polin entered into partnership with Thomas Tidswell (1870–1950). One of the firm's early works was the design of the Mechanics Institute in Coonamble in rural NSW. Another was the enlargement of the Right Rev Dr Higgins, Roman Catholic Auxiliary-Bishop of Sydney’s residence Mount Eagle in Forbes Street Darlington.

In 1901 Polin joined Townsville architects Albert Edmund Bates (1862—1929) and George Thomas Eaton in a partnership known as Eaton, Bates & Polin. After 1902 their head office was moved to Brisbane, with branches retained at Rockhampton and Townsville. A branch operated briefly at Toowoomba in the early 1900s. They undertook a wide variety of architectural work, from hotels and commercial buildings to residences, hospitals and masonic halls, and received a number of commissions from the Catholic Church – churches, schools, convents and presbyteries. One of their most glamorous commissions was for the new Queen's Hotel in Townsville (1901–04). Cremorne at Hamilton in Brisbane (1905–06) was one of their larger residential designs. Their style was eclectic, drawing upon both eastern and western classical traditions, with a particular emphasis on verandahs and pavilions – both as a decorative device and as appropriate to the warm Queensland climate.

== Death ==
Polin died in Sydney in 1961.
