= Town of Laidley =

Local government area of Queensland, Australia

Coordinates: 27.640°S 152.397°E

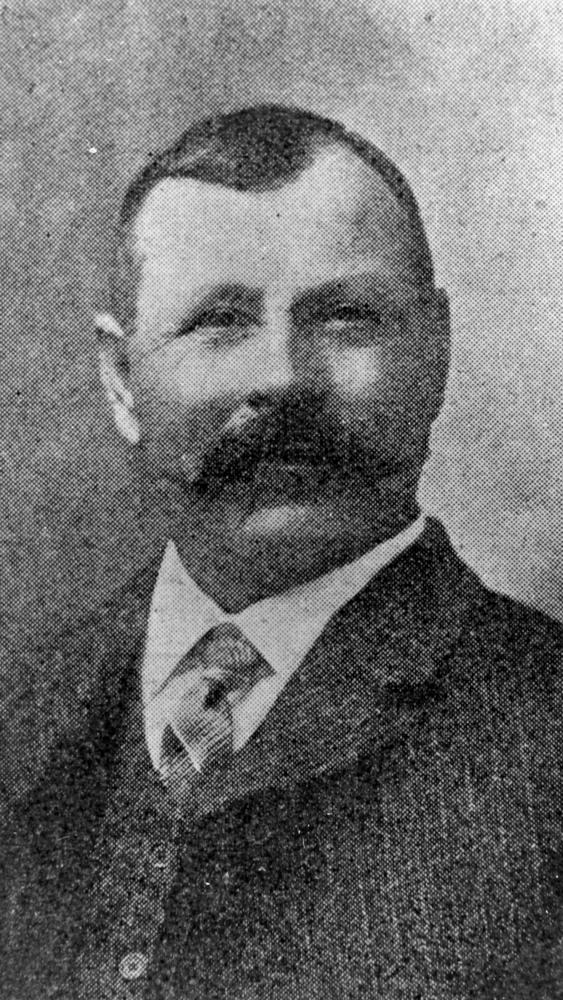
H. Daniel, Mayor of Laidley, circa 1905

The Town of Laidley is a former local government area comprising the town of Laidley in the Lockyer Valley area between the cities Ipswich and Toowoomba in Queensland, Australia. It existed between 1902 and 1917.

== History ==
The Tarampa Division was established on 15 January 1880 under the Divisional Boards Act 1879. On 25 April 1888, part of the Tarampa Division was separated to create the Laidley Division.

On 1 July 1902, the Borough of Laidley was established as a municipality for the town of Laidley from part of Subdivision 1 of the Division of Laidley and part of Subdivision 3 of the Division of Tarampa.

With the passage of the Local Authorities Act 1902, on 31 March 1903, the Borough of Laidley and the urban parts of the Division of Laidley became the Town of Laidley, while the rural parts of the Division of Laidley became the Shire of Laidley.

On 8 February 1917, the Town of Laidley was abolished and absorbed into the Shire of Laidley.

== Mayors ==
The mayors of the Town of Laidley include:

- 1905: H. Daniel
