= Cremorne, Hamilton =

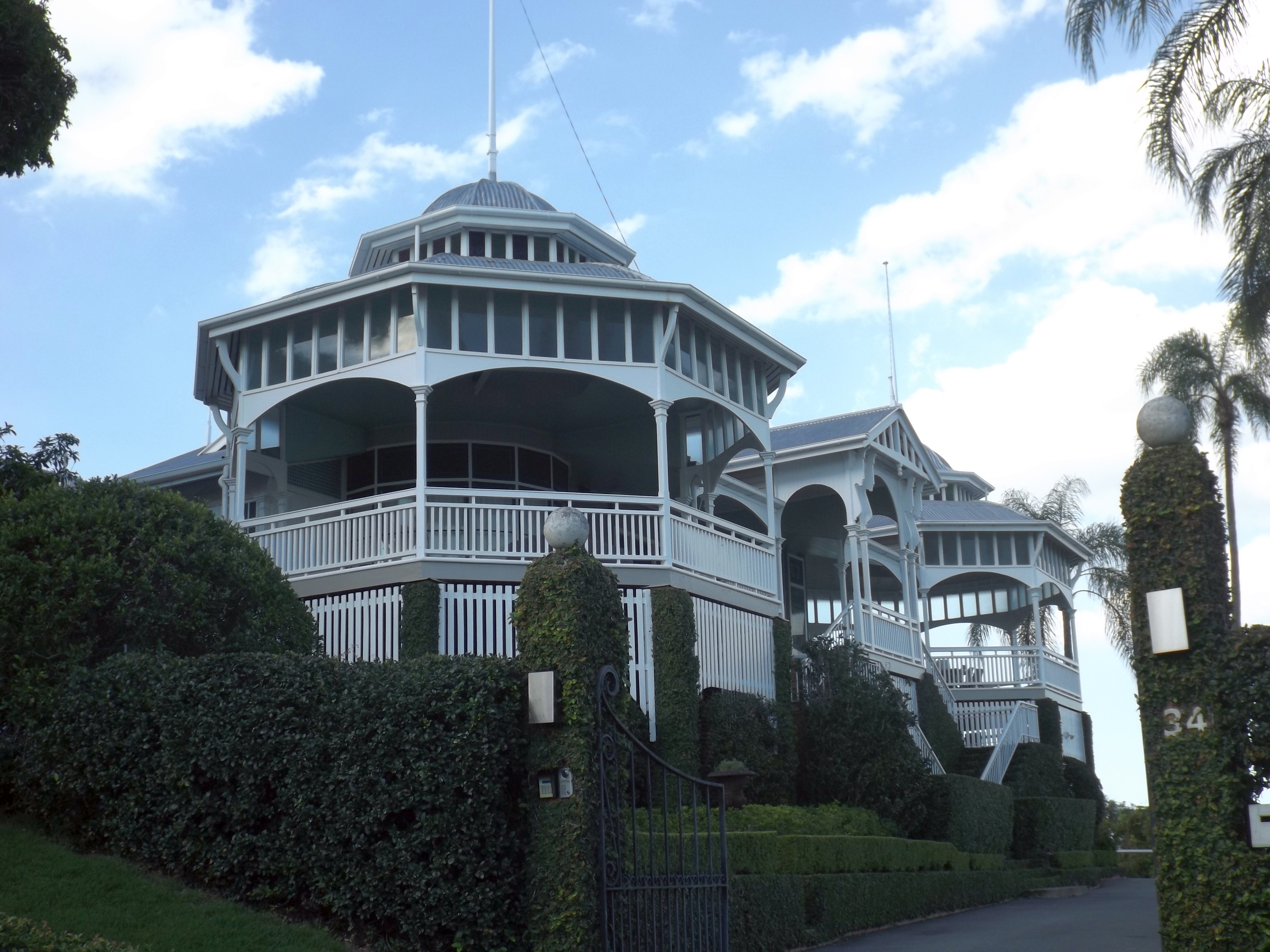
- Building in 2015

- Location within Queensland Location within Australia
- 27.439°S 153.0595°E
- Location: 34 Mullens Street, Hamilton, City of Brisbane, Queensland, Australia

History
- Design period: 1900–1914 (early 20th century)
- Built: 1905–1906
- Built for: James Denis O'Connor

Site notes
- Architect: Eaton & Bates
- Architectural style: Federation Filigree

Queensland Heritage Register
- Official name: Cremorne
- Type: state heritage (landscape, built)
- Designated: 21 October 1992
- Reference no.: 600218
- Significant period: 1900s–1910s (fabric, historical); 1930s? (stone cutting – fabric & historical)
- Significant components: garden/grounds, terracing, lead light/s, driveway, trellis, gate – entrance, residential accommodation – main house, embankment – road, views to, service wing, steps/stairway, trees/plantings, views from

Cremorne is a heritage-listed villa at 34 Mullens Street, Hamilton, City of Brisbane, Queensland, Australia. It was designed by Eaton & Bates and built from 1905 to 1906. It was added to the Queensland Heritage Register on 21 October 1992.

== History ==
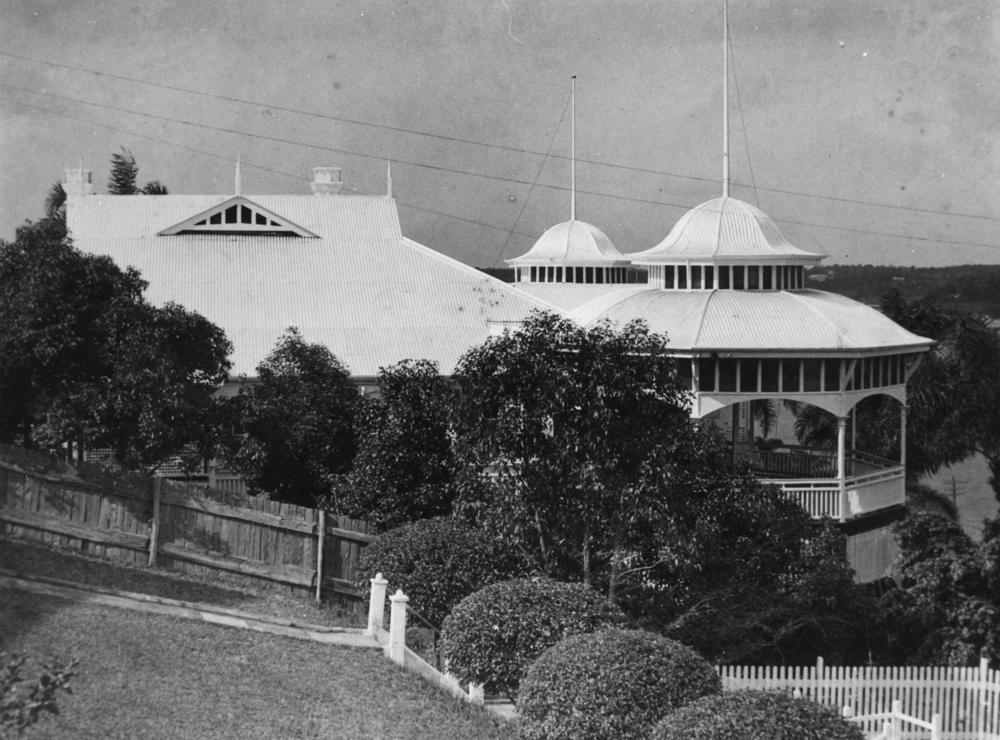
Side view of the distinctive, pavilion verandahs of Cremorne, circa 1935

Cremorne is a substantial, single-storeyed, high-set timber residence erected c. 1905 – c. 1906 for Brisbane publican James Denis O'Connor. It was designed by the firm of Eaton & Bates, Sydney-trained architects who built up a substantial Queensland practice from c. 1894–c. 1908.

JD O'Connor, born in Ireland c. 1860, had emigrated to South Australia in 1878, and was in business in Adelaide before moving north to Queensland, reputedly for health reasons, in 1889. His brother, Denis O'Connor, was already a well-known Brisbane publican, connected from at least 1884 with a number of Brisbane hotels, including the Globe Hotel, Dunmore Arms Hotel, O'Connor's Family Hotel (at Stones Corner), Oriental House (later the Wickham) from 1890, and later with the Prince Consort Hotel in Fortitude Valley. JD O'Connor held the licence to the Stanley Hotel at the corner of Stanley Street and Boggo Road, Woolloongabba, 1890–96.

In Brisbane in 1895, JD O'Connor married Catherine Julia Graham, whose father, John Graham, was one of the earliest land holders at Moreton Bay, having purchased land at South Brisbane in 1842. Johnny Graham was a well-known Brisbane identity and property owner, and a keen sportsman. For 30 years, from 1866 to 1896, he held the licences to several South Brisbane hotels. He established Graham's Family Hotel in Stanley Street, South Brisbane in 1888, and held the licence until 1896, when it was transferred to his son-in-law, who changed the name to O'Connor's Hotel.

Around 1902, a garden theatre, called Cremorne Gardens was operating at O’Connor’s Hotel, loosely based on the concept of the larger and more famous “pleasure gardens” of that name in London, Melbourne, Sydney and elsewhere around Australia. These gardens were later developed into the Cremorne Theatre and live on in the current Cremorne Theatre, within a few hundred metres of O’Connor’s original site, as part of the Queensland Performing Arts Centre, South Bank. This JD O'Connor is understood to have sold O'Connor's Hotel c. 1909, and retired from the hotel business altogether c. 1913.

Cremorne Hamilton is not the only notable Brisbane home named after this venue. Cremorne Sandgate, was built by John Neil McCallum, the manager and later owner of the Cremorne Theatre from 1911 to 1954. It was the childhood home of John McCallum, well known actor and TV producer, including of the series Skippy the Bush Kangaroo.

In 1904, JD O'Connor obtained title to nearly 1.5 acres (0.61 ha) of hillside land at Hamilton, formerly part of the Eldernell Estate and first subdivided in 1890. Here he erected a very fine timber residence which he named Cremorne. Although the JD O'Connor's had only one child, a daughter born in 1896, they erected a large house designed for entertaining, with generously proportioned rooms, and wide verandahs and verandah pavilions which took advantage of the views of the Brisbane river, southern suburbs and city. It was designed by one of the most fashionable architectural firms of the day, Messrs Eaton & Bates of Brisbane, Rockhampton and Townsville.

Sydney-trained architects George T Eaton and Albert E Bates had formed a partnership in Rockhampton c. 1894 and developed a successful Central Queensland practice in the late 19th century, with branch offices established at Mount Morgan and Longreach by 1898, Clermont in 1900, Gladstone in 1901, Maryborough in 1902, and Townsville by 1902. Arthur B Polin of Sydney joined the partnership in Townsville c. 1901, as Eaton, Bates & Polin. After 1902 their head office was moved to Brisbane, with branches retained at Rockhampton and Townsville. A branch operated briefly at Toowoomba in the early 1900s. They undertook a wide variety of architectural work, from hotels and commercial buildings to residences, hospitals and masonic halls, and received a number of commissions from the Catholic Church - churches, schools, convents and presbyteries. One of their most glamorous commissions was for the new Queen's Hotel (1901–04) (Telecasters North Queensland Ltd Building) at Townsville. Cremorne (1905–06) is one of their larger residential designs. Their style was eclectic, drawing upon both eastern and western classical traditions, with a particular emphasis on verandahs and pavilions - both as a decorative device and as appropriate to the warm Queensland climate.

Eaton & Bates called tenders for a large villa residence on the Eldernell Estate, Hamilton, in June 1905, and this is thought to refer to Cremorne. The JD O'Connors were resident at Mullens Street, Hamilton, by 1907.

Three generations of the O'Connor family resided on the property for nearly 90 years, and retained ownership until the late 1990s. JD O'Connor had transferred title to his wife in 1916, prior to his death (at Cremorne) in 1919. Following Mrs O'Connor's death in 1952, Cremorne passed to their daughter, Lynette Mulcahy, who had married Thomas Edward Mulcahy in 1921. The Mulcahys had two children, a son and daughter, and Cremorne subsequently passed to their daughter, who subdivided the land, selling the house on a reduced site in 1998. Both the house site and the vacant block in front are included in the heritage listing boundary.

== Description ==
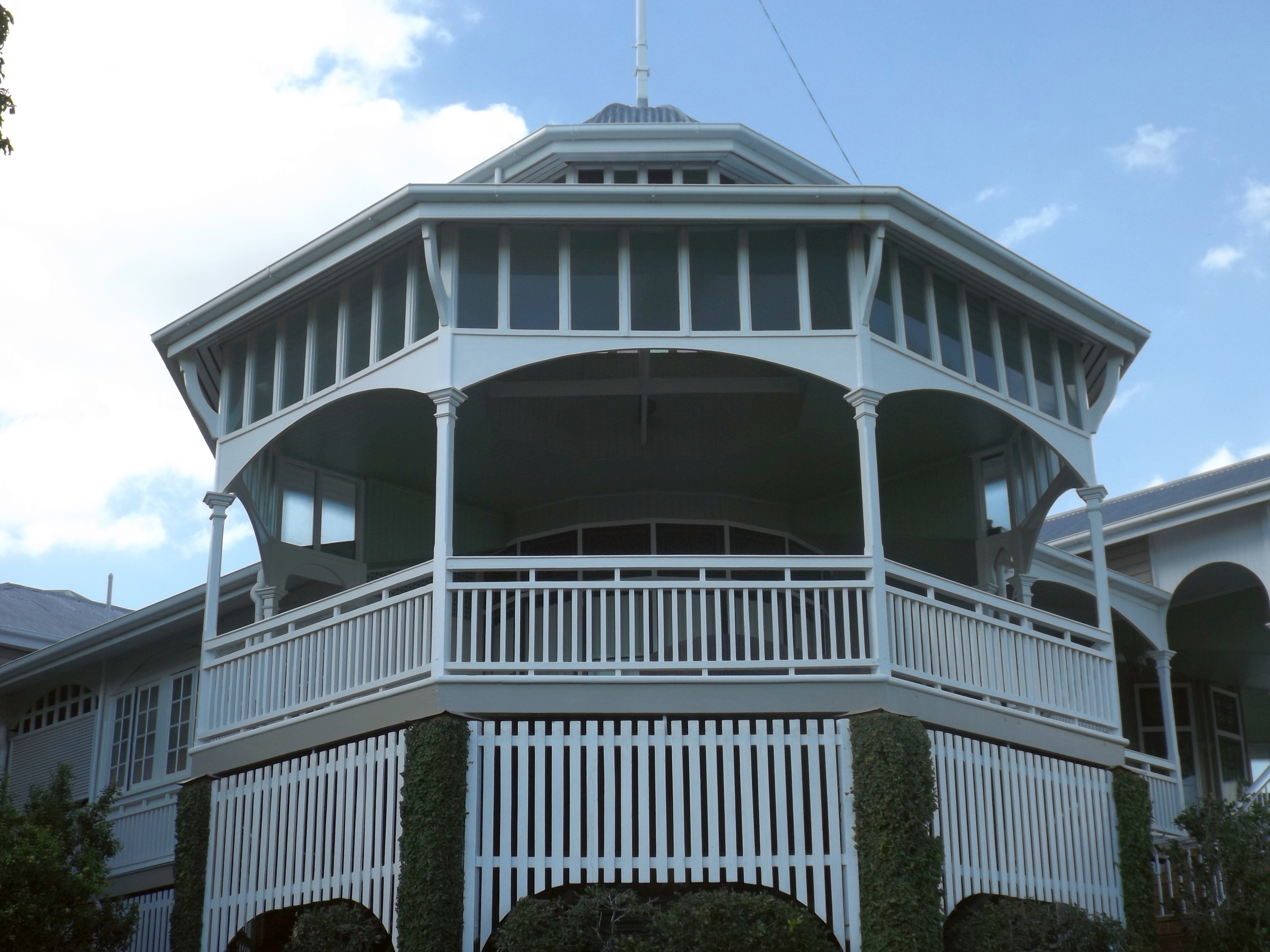
Southeast rotunda, 2015

Cremorne is a large, imposing, single-storeyed timber residence, situated halfway up the steep slope of Eldernell/Hamilton Hill in Brisbane, with expansive views of the Brisbane River and the city's southeastern suburbs. It has extensive grounds sloping down the hill to Kingsford Smith Drive, ending in a steep stone cutting, and is a prominent landmark from the southern suburbs. The higher ground has terraced lawns, with a long, central flight of concrete steps leading to the lower terrace. A bituminoid driveway, accessed from Mullens Street through brick entrance pillars and a timber trellis, sweeps in front of the house and up around the eastern side of the property to a carport at the rear. This driveway is lined by an avenue of distinctive, mature queen palms Arecastrum romanzoffianum. Further down the slope the grounds comprise mostly indigenous vegetation.

The house is almost L-shaped in plan, and has a corrugated iron roof which is a complex of hips, gables, ridges and pavilions, with decorative gablets and finials, and three brick chimneys. There are verandahs, with separate roofs, on all four sides. Several of these have been enclosed. The open verandahs all have simple timber balustrading and timber frieze, and ceilings of narrow tongue and groove timber. Most of the walls are single-skin tongue and groove timber, but where exposed to the weather, are clad externally with chamferboards.

Due to excavation and the natural falling away of the ground toward the south, the house is high-set at the front, which faces south toward the river, but low-set at the rear, where there is a small, level backyard excavated from the hillside. The house mostly sits on timber stumps with concrete footings, but the perimeter stumps have been replaced by brick piers with arched timber battening between. A centrally positioned divided brick stair, with a gabled portico above, gives access to the front verandah and front entrance.

The front elevation is dominated by a deep, open verandah with large rotundas or pavilions at the southwest and southeast corners, which take advantage of the views and river breezes. This verandah has simple timber valances, posts and balusters, and the rotundas have ogee-shaped cupolas above a frieze of pink and green glass panels. At the southwest corner of the house a large, faceted bay window projects onto the verandah from the main bedroom; this is mirrored at the southeast corner by another faceted bay from the drawing room. Both bays have very fine Art Nouveau leadlights, and there are similar leadlights around the front entrance door. The front exterior wall has later fibrous cement sheeting and timber battening, creating a vaguely Tudoresque appearance.

On the western side of the house, the verandah outside the main and second bedrooms is enclosed with casement windows and fibrous cement sheeting behind the timber balustrade, and is separated from the southwest rotunda by large folding timber doors. The narrow, western verandah passageway outside the rear bedrooms and bathroom is only partly enclosed, with a timber frieze and timber lattice infill above the timber balustrade. Part of the eastern verandah, adjacent to the drawing room, is enclosed as a sunroom, with a single door opening onto the southeast corner rotunda. The rear verandah still functions as a passage, but is enclosed with chamferboards and sliding aluminium-framed windows.

Internally, the house retains the original configuration of rooms, with the private rooms on the western side separated by an entrance vestibule and north-south central hallway from the public rooms on the eastern side, and a service wing at the rear.

The private rooms comprise a master bedroom and second bedroom opening off the central hall, and a side passage leading west from the central hallway to the dressing room, bathroom, and another bedroom. A small bedroom at the northwest corner of the house is accessed from the now enclosed rear verandah. There is another room, possibly a former bedroom, which also opens off the back verandah, but has been modified substantially.

Opening off the front vestibule to the east is the drawing room, which has a southeast bay with leadlight windows and French doors opening onto the front verandah. The dining room opens off the central hallway and has an eastern bay with leadlights and a large, step-out window opening onto the eastern verandah. Drawing and dining rooms are separated by a side passage which leads east off the central hallway to what is now the sunroom (formerly part of the eastern verandah). The door opening from this hallway to the sunroom is an external door, with leadlight surrounds.

The service wing behind the dining room comprises servery, crockery room, kitchen (with a c. 1960 fitout) and two servant's bedrooms, one of which has early linoleum flooring. A later bathroom and laundry are located on the enclosed verandah of the service wing.

The interior has early joinery throughout - including a decorative, arched timber divider between the entrance vestibule and central hallway, and timber arches to the side passageways - all of which has been painted. The drawing and dining rooms have fireplaces with early marbled timber fireplace surrounds, fireplace and hearth tiles, and metal grates and fenders. Most of the timber partition walls are clad with later fibrous cement sheeting with wallpaper and a later timber dado strip. Most of the rooms have later plaster ceilings, but the entrance vestibule and drawing room have early, decorative pressed metal ceilings. Floors throughout are of narrow hardwood.

== Heritage listing ==
Cremorne was listed on the Queensland Heritage Register on 21 October 1992 having satisfied the following criteria.

The place is important in demonstrating the evolution or pattern of Queensland's history.

Cremorne, a large, substantially intact timber residence constructed in 1905–06, is important in illustrating the continued development of Hamilton in the late 19th/early 20th centuries, as one of Brisbane's most prestigious suburbs.

The place is important in demonstrating the principal characteristics of a particular class of cultural places.

The house is an example of Queensland federation-period domestic architecture, which, with its generous verandahs, distinctive rotundas, and attention to ventilation in the design, materials and details, addresses both aspect and climate in a creative and aesthetic manner.

The place is important because of its aesthetic significance.

Situated on a prominent riverside site, Cremorne and its grounds are significant for their landmark and aesthetic qualities.

The place has a special association with the life or work of a particular person, group or organisation of importance in Queensland's history.

The house is important as the only identified Brisbane example of the domestic work of architects Eaton & Bates, who made a significant contribution to Queensland architecture in the late 1890s and early 1900s.
