= Queen's Hotel, Townsville =

Queen's Hotel
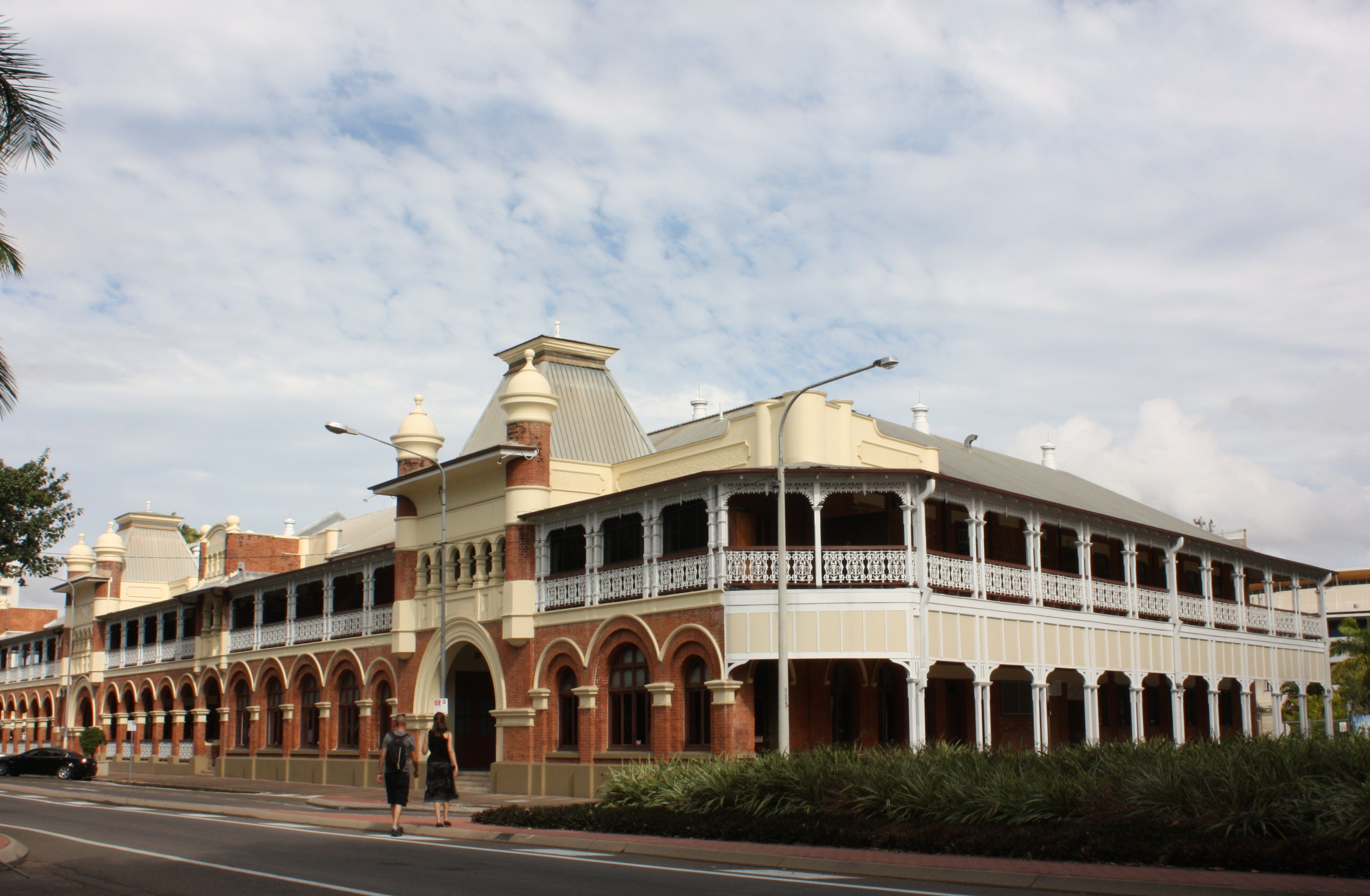
- Former Queen's Hotel, 2010

- Location within Queensland Location within Australia
- 19.2561°S 146.8226°E
- Location: 12 The Strand, Townsville CBD, City of Townsville, Queensland, Australia

History
- Design period: 1900–1914 (early 20th century)
- Built: 1902–1920s

Queensland Heritage Register
- Official name: Telecasters North Queensland Ltd Building, Queens' Hotel
- Type: state heritage (built)
- Designated: 21 October 1992
- Reference no.: 600936
- Significant period: 1900s–1920s (fabric); 1902–c. 1966 (historical use as hotel); WWII (use by US army)
- Significant components: toilet block/earth closet/water closet, lead light/s, tower, loggia/s

Queen's Hotel is a heritage-listed former hotel at 12 The Strand, Townsville CBD, City of Townsville, Queensland, Australia. It was built from 1902 to 1920s. It is also known as the Telecasters North Queensland Ltd Building. It was added to the Queensland Heritage Register on 21 October 1992.

== History ==
The former Queen's Hotel, a large, two-storeyed masonry building, was erected in several stages between 1902 and the mid-1920s. It was considered the finest hotel in North Queensland.

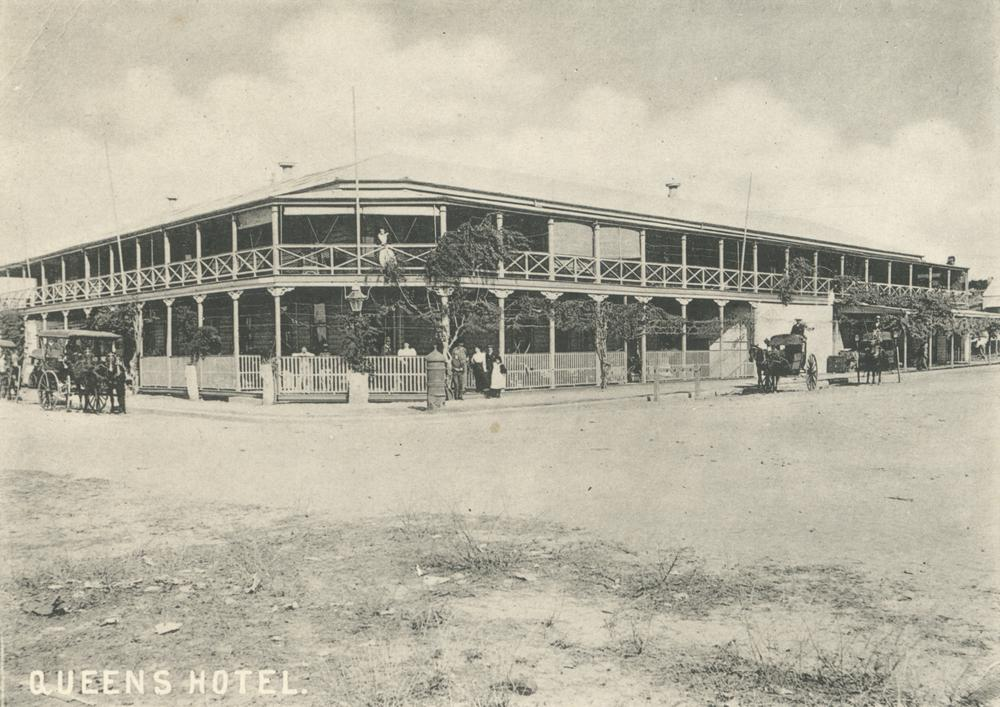
The first Queen's Hotel, circa 1900

Townsville's first Queen's Hotel, a two-storeyed timber structure, was erected at the corner of Wickham Street and The Strand in 1872, and was extended along Wickham Street in the 1880s. It early acquired a reputation as one of the best kept hotels in Queensland, patronised by visiting dignitaries.

In 1899 the property and license were purchased by John Henry Tyack. He raised a £14,000 mortgage on the property, and called for competitive designs to replace the timber building with a substantial brick structure. The winning entry was submitted by architects Eaton, Bates & Polin, who had opened an office in Townsville c.1901. Eaton & Bates had trained in Sydney, but by the turn of the century their principal offices were in Brisbane, with branch offices in Rockhampton, Townsville and Toowoomba. Arthur Polin was managing partner of the Townsville office.

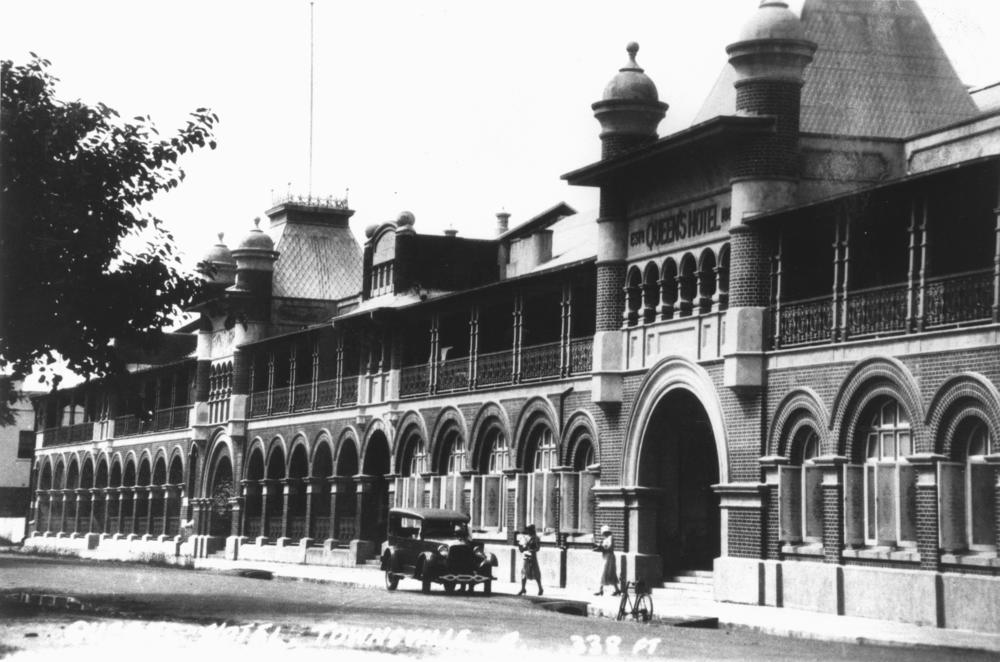
Queen's Hotel, ca. 1932

The original design was more modest in size than the final structure, extending along the Strand only as far as the eastern tower, and around the corner of Wickham Street for eight bays. It was erected in stages, with trade continuing from the original hotel on the corner of Wickham Street and the Strand until 1925. In 1901, Tyack purchased an adjoining block (site of the former North Australian Hotel) along the Strand, which permitted construction of the first section of the new Queen's Hotel, comprising the eastern tower and four bays to its west, c.1902. This section was extant by March 1903. In May 1904, Tyack replaced the first mortgage with one for £20,000, which probably financed construction of the second section, completed by 1905. This involved demolition of part of the timber building along the Strand, and the extension of the brick building a further six bays toward the corner of Wickham Street. The contractor was a Mr Boyle, and work was underway in January 1904. For the next twenty years, Queen's Hotel consisted of a brick wing along the Strand, and a corner timber section which continued back along Wickham Street.

Publican John Tyack continued the tradition of fine service and hospitality at the Queen's. He was active also in civic affairs, and, as Mayor of Townsville in 1912, encouraged council improvements along the Strand and foreshore in front of the Queen's Hotel. This included the 1913 construction of a cast-iron bandstand, with balustrading to match that on the hotel. Tyack died in 1913, prior to construction of the final stages of his grand hotel.

Following Tyack's death, the hotel was placed in the hands of Queensland Trustees Ltd, who transferred the various properties to Queen's Hotel Townsville Ltd in 1924–25. At the same time, Queen's Hotel Townsville Ltd acquired three adjoining allotments along the Strand, which permitted the construction of a further 10 bays of the hotel toward the east. The remaining timber section of the hotel was demolished, and the western tower and Wickham Street wing were completed.

The 1920s additions and alterations, costing approximately £40,000, were designed by respected Townsville architect Walter Hunt, and constructed by established Townsville contractor WH Turner. Work was underway by the end of 1924, and the eastern extension, comprising 48 rooms, was completed in mid-1925. The timber building was demolished in late 1925, in preparation for the next stage of the new building. The section at the corner of the Strand and Wickham Street was erected in 1925–26, and occupied in August 1926. This ground floor of this section comprised the main entrance hall, extensions to dining room and lounge, offices, and bars; bedrooms and balconies occupied the first floor. A detached block at the rear, comprising kitchen and scullery on the ground floor and bathrooms and toilets on the first, was erected at the same time. The final stage along Wickham Street was erected in 1926–28. Work was commenced in mid-1926, but a 1927 strike in the building industry delayed its completion. Included in this wing were parlours, a commercial room, nursery, servants' dining room, two shops and some bedrooms on the ground floor, and bedrooms on the first floor.

Through the 1920s and 1930s, when the license was held by Bridget Mary Guinane, Queen's Hotel retained its reputation as North Queensland's premier hotel. During the Second World War, when Townsville was the principal Australian base from which the Pacific war was fought, the Queen's Hotel was occupied as an American army officers' mess. After the war, the hotel fell into gradual decline. In 1966, Far Northern Theatres Ltd acquired the property, and demolished several bays at the end of each wing. The building was sold to Townsville firm Samuel Allen & Sons Ltd in 1973, and in 1977 was acquired by Telecasters North Queensland Ltd, who restored the exterior and converted the interior into television and radio studios and offices.

In August 2015, a $250M redevelopment of the area to be called the King Street Precinct was proposed, which would include residential, cultural and commercial elements, but with no specific plan for the re-use of the former Queen's Hotel. As at January 2016, the former Queen's Hotel is available for lease as office space.

== Description ==
Queen's Hotel, located on the southern side of The Strand and returning into Wickham Street, is a two-storeyed structure containing television studios and offices built of English Bond brickwork with rendered detailing. The brickwork has been sandblasted to remove a coat of paint, and the building has a hipped ribbed metal roof, similar in form to the original roof.

The Strand elevation shows Art Nouveau and Indian/Colonial influences in its design, including turrets crowned by cupolas framing low tower forms along the northern frontage, decorative render panels, wide eaves and arcaded loggias to the ground floor with verandahs above. The two large and two small tower forms differ slightly in their design and proportions, with the two larger having a broad, recessed arched entry with a recessed loggia above and surmounted by a steep pitch ribbed metal roof. The smaller forms are surmounted by a rounded pediment. Sections of the ground floor arcaded loggias are enclosed with timber framed glazing, and the open sections have cast iron balustrade and French doors with fanlights. The verandah, off which French doors with fanlights also open, has paired timber posts with cast iron balustrade and valance. Metal stanchions have been added to the face of the brickwork for the purpose of tying the roof down, and sections of floor have been replaced with concrete. Four bays of the eastern end of the building have been demolished and the verandah now returns along this face to the rear.

The Wickham Street elevation has a rendered corner parapet and a timber verandah with paired posts, timber brackets to the ground floor and cast iron balustrade and valance to the first floor. The southern end of the building has been demolished, and the facade altered, with window and door openings having been enclosed or moved.

The rear of the building has been substantially altered, with only one of the original masonry two-storeyed toilet blocks remaining, and a large television studio and communication equipment have been added. Sections of the rear verandah remain as internal corridor, off which French doors with fanlights open. The rear of the site contains car parking. Internally, the building has been substantially altered. The entrance hall contains a carved cedar staircase with a twin return, two figurine lamps on the bottom balusters and leadlight sash windows at the landing. This space has a raised ceiling with plaster mouldings including a deep cornice with recessed lighting, laurel relief, ornamental ventilation panels and a centre glazed skylight, which no longer admits natural light. There are sections of original joinery throughout the building, including doors with etched glass panels into the former dining room, internal doors, architraves and skirtings.

The building has false ceilings and air conditioning throughout. There are sections of marble tiled floor in the foyer and former Palm Lounge, now the Telecine room, but they do not match early photographs of these areas. The first floor is mostly office space, with the former bedrooms being enlarged by the removal of partition walls.

== Heritage listing ==
Queen's Hotel was listed on the Queensland Heritage Register on 21 October 1992 having satisfied the following criteria.

The place is important in demonstrating the evolution or pattern of Queensland's history.

The former Queen's Hotel, erected in several stages between 1902 and the mid-1920s, was once the premier hotel of North Queensland, and survives as important evidence of the evolution of Townsville as the principal city of North Queensland by the early 20th century.

The place is important in demonstrating the principal characteristics of a particular class of cultural places.

Sufficient of the fabric remains to understand the building as a large, ostentatious, two-storeyed masonry hotel, and to illustrate the work of Queensland architects Eaton, Bates and Polin.

The place is important because of its aesthetic significance.

The place has a strong association with the Townsville community as a local landmark, and is significant aesthetically for the composition and massing of the building's architectural elements, the quality of the building's surviving interior elements, and its contribution to The Strand streetscape and Townsville townscape.

The place has a strong or special association with a particular community or cultural group for social, cultural or spiritual reasons.

The place has a strong association with the Townsville community as a local landmark, and is significant aesthetically for the composition and massing of the building's architectural elements, the quality of the building's surviving interior elements, and its contribution to The Strand streetscape and Townsville townscape.

The place has a special association with the life or work of a particular person, group or organisation of importance in Queensland's history.

Sufficient of the fabric remains to understand the building as a large, ostentatious, two-storeyed masonry hotel, and to illustrate the work of Queensland architects Eaton, Bates and Polin.
