= Eaton & Bates =

Eaton & Bates was an architectural partnership in Queensland, Australia which built up a substantial Queensland practice from c. 1894-c. 1908. From 1901, it was known as Eaton, Bates & Polin. Many of their works are now heritage-listed.

== Partnership ==
Sydney-trained architects George Thomas Eaton and Albert Edmund Bates formed a partnership in Rockhampton c. 1894 and developed a successful Central Queensland practice in the late 19th century, with branch offices established at Mount Morgan and Longreach by 1898, Clermont in 1900, Gladstone in 1901, Maryborough in 1902, and Townsville by 1902. Arthur Beckford Polin of Sydney joined the partnership in Townsville c. 1901, as Eaton, Bates & Polin. After 1902 their head office was moved to Brisbane, with branches retained at Rockhampton and Townsville. A branch operated briefly at Toowoomba in the early 1900s. They undertook a wide variety of architectural work, from hotels and commercial buildings to residences, hospitals and masonic halls, and received a number of commissions from the Catholic Church - churches, schools, convents and presbyteries. One of their most glamorous commissions was for the new Queen's Hotel (1901–04) (Telecasters North Queensland Ltd Building) at Townsville. Cremorne at Hamilton in Brisbane (1905–06) was one of their larger residential designs. Their style was eclectic, drawing upon both eastern and western classical traditions, with a particular emphasis on verandahs and pavilions - both as a decorative device and as appropriate to the warm Queensland climate.

== Works ==
Works attributed to Eaton & Bates include:

- Queen's Hotel, Townsville (1901–1904)
- Exchange Hotel, Laidley
- Cremorne, a villa at Hamilton (1905–1906)

Works attributed to Eaton, Bates & Polin include:

- Henlein & Co, commercial premises in Townsville (1901–1902)
