= River Raisin National Battlefield Park =

United States historic place

- River Raisin Battlefield Site (20MR227)
- U.S. National Register of Historic Places
- U.S. National Battlefield Park
- Michigan State Historic Site
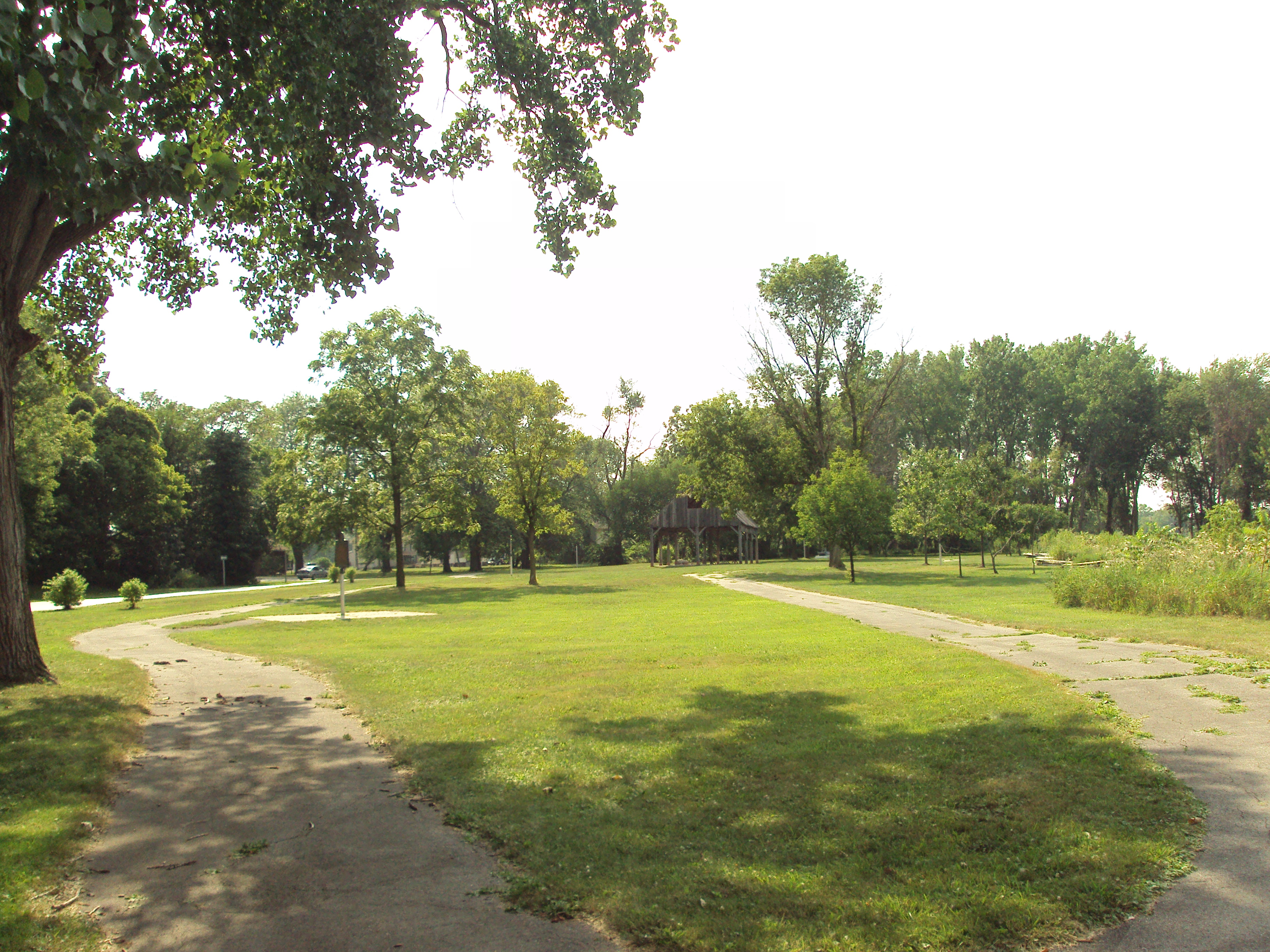

- Location within Michigan
- Location: Monroe, Michigan
- Coordinates: 41°54′49″N 83°22′42″W
- Area: 42.18 acres (0.1707 km^{2})
- Visitation: 133,643 (2025)
- Website: River Raisin National Battlefield Park
- NRHP reference No.: 82000542 (original); 100003658 (increase)

Significant dates
- Added to NRHP: December 10, 1982
- Boundary increase: April 17, 2019
- Designated NBP: March 30, 2009
- Designated MSHS: February 18, 1956

The River Raisin National Battlefield Park preserves the location of the January 1813 Battle of Frenchtown in southeastern Michigan, and is the only national battlefield park marking a site of the War of 1812. The park was established as the 393rd unit of the United States National Park Service under Title VII of the Omnibus Public Land Management Act, which was signed into law on March 30, 2009. The park is located in the city of Monroe in Monroe County, Michigan. The site was designated as a Michigan Historic Site on February 18, 1956, and was added to the National Register of Historic Places on December 10, 1982. The former River Raisin Battlefield Visitor Center at 1403 East Elm Avenue was added to the National Register listing in 2019. River Raisin National Battlefield Park officially began operation as a national park unit on October 22, 2010.

== Background ==
The park encompasses the site of the costly Battle of Frenchtown, in which 397 Americans were killed and 547 taken prisoner in an engagement against the British and their Indigenous allies during the War of 1812. Fighting took place on January 18, 1813 and three days later on January 22. The first engagement, sometimes called the First Battle of the River Raisin, was a success for the American forces. British soldiers led by Colonel Henry Procter and Indigenous warriors led by Roundhead mounted a counterattack against the American forces led by Brigadier General James Winchester four days later. Many of the Americans were inexperienced troops from Kentucky. They were ill-prepared to withstand a sustained attack and their retreat route was quickly blocked.

Only 33 of Winchester's 980 men escaped the battlefield. The day after the battle, a number of captured Americans too wounded to walk were murdered by the Potawatomi in apparent reprisal for atrocities the Kentuckians had committed against them. This incident is known as the River Raisin Massacre. Those wounded prisoners who were able to walk were taken to Detroit or Amherstburg and ransomed.

== Recent history ==
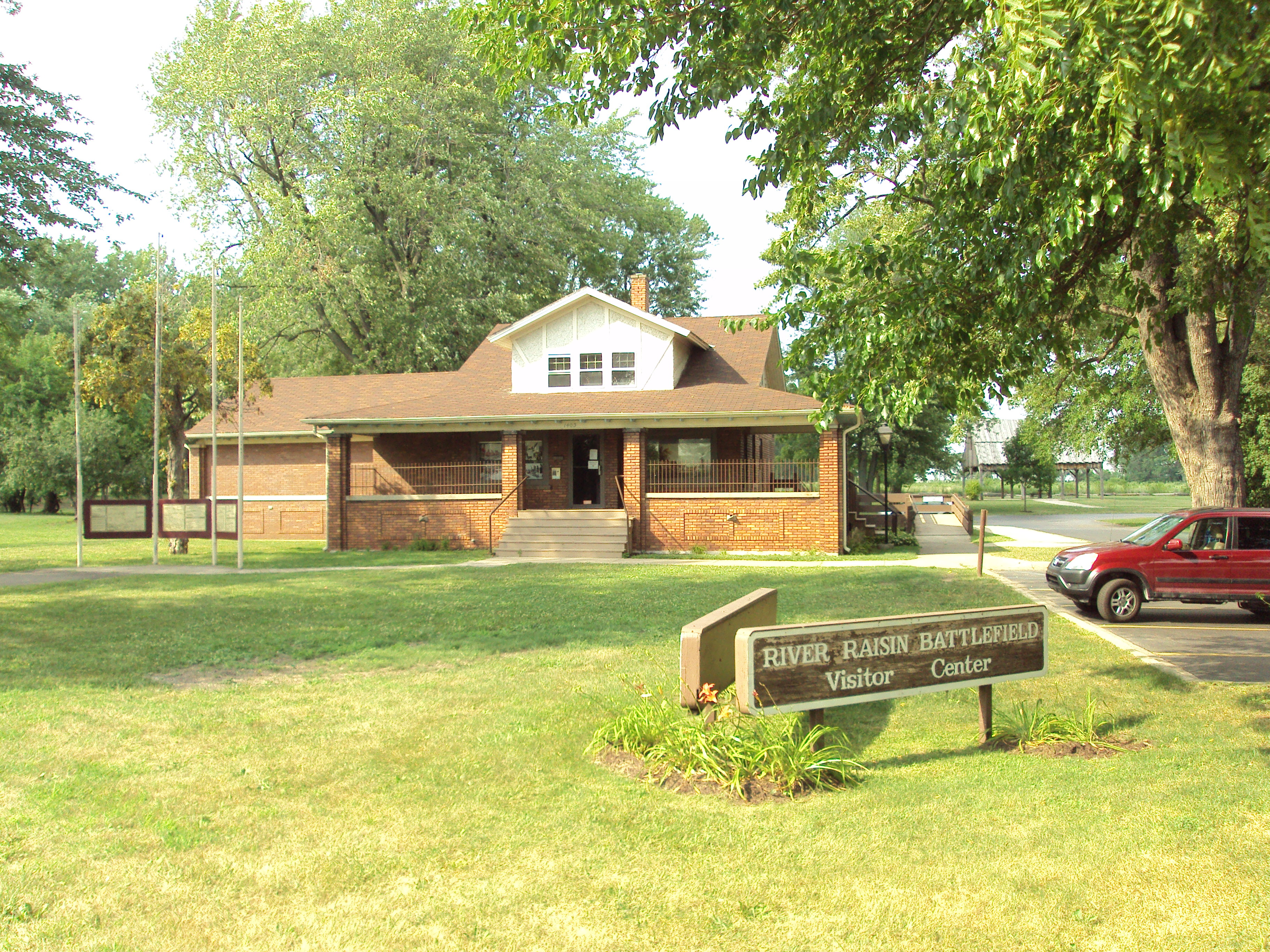
The former River Raisin Battlefield Visitor Center

The River Raisin Battlefield Site was listed as a Michigan Historic Site on February 18, 1956, although the exact date at which a park was first organized is unknown. The site is bounded by the North Dixie Highway, the River Raisin, Detroit Avenue, and Mason Run Creek. The Battle of Frenchtown is so named because it took place in and around the Frenchtown Settlement (1784) on the north side of the River Raisin and within the present-day city limits of Monroe. The battles extended a few miles to the north and south of the current park site. Frenchtown was gradually abandoned after the battle. The present-day city of Monroe developed from its downtown core 1.5 miles (2.4 km) to the west on the opposite side of the River Raisin. The current park area encompasses some 40 acres (16 ha) on Monroe's east side approximately 440 yards (400 m) west of Interstate 75. The River Raisin Paper Company built a large paper mill on the site around 1911, which operated under multiple owners until 1995.

The site was recognized nationally when it was added to the National Register of Historic Places on December 10, 1982. It was officially listed as the River Raisin Battlefield Site (20MR227). In July 1990, the Monroe County Historic Commission and the Monroe County Historic Society opened the River Raisin Battlefield Visitor Center at 1403 East Elm Avenue. The museum contains a few relics from the original battle that were discovered during archeological investigations. The park hosts a memorial service every January to commemorate the soldiers who fought in the Battle of Frenchtown, including the British and their Indigenous allies.

Expansion to the present-day park boundaries commenced in 1995 with the closure of the paper mill, at which time the City of Monroe organized efforts to restore the entire battlefield site. The city, the Monroe County Historical Society, and the property owner negotiated, acquired and facilitated the cleanup of the former paper mill property and adjacent landfill area for future donation to the park service. In addition they transferred a large expanse of wetlands to the State of Michigan for expansion of the adjacent Sterling State Park. Acquisitions were complete by 2006, the paper mill was demolished by 2009, the cleanup finished in 2010, and land transfers were completed in 2011.

=== Promotion to the National Park System ===
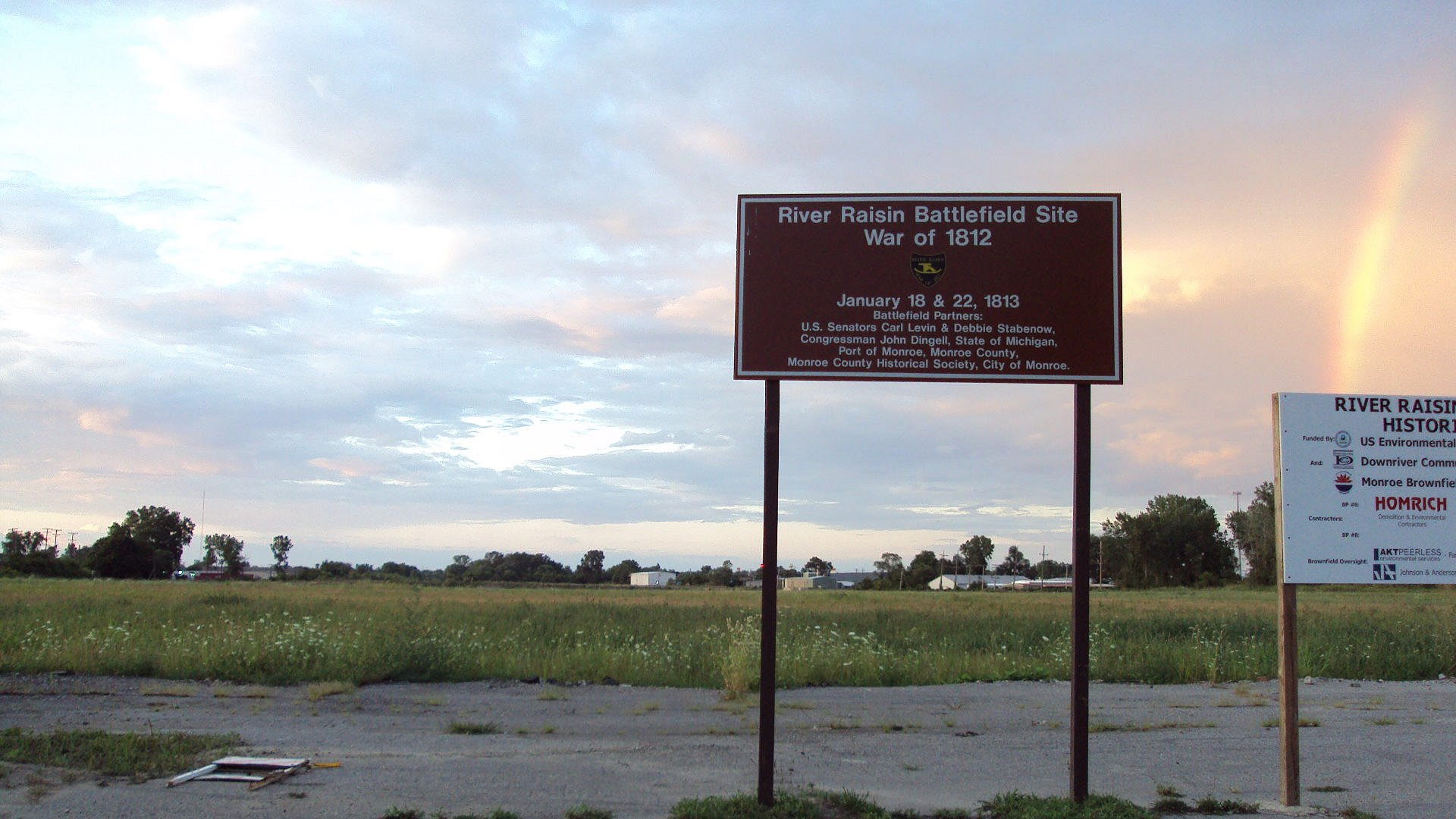
Much of the landscape within the site has not been restored to battlefield-era conditions.

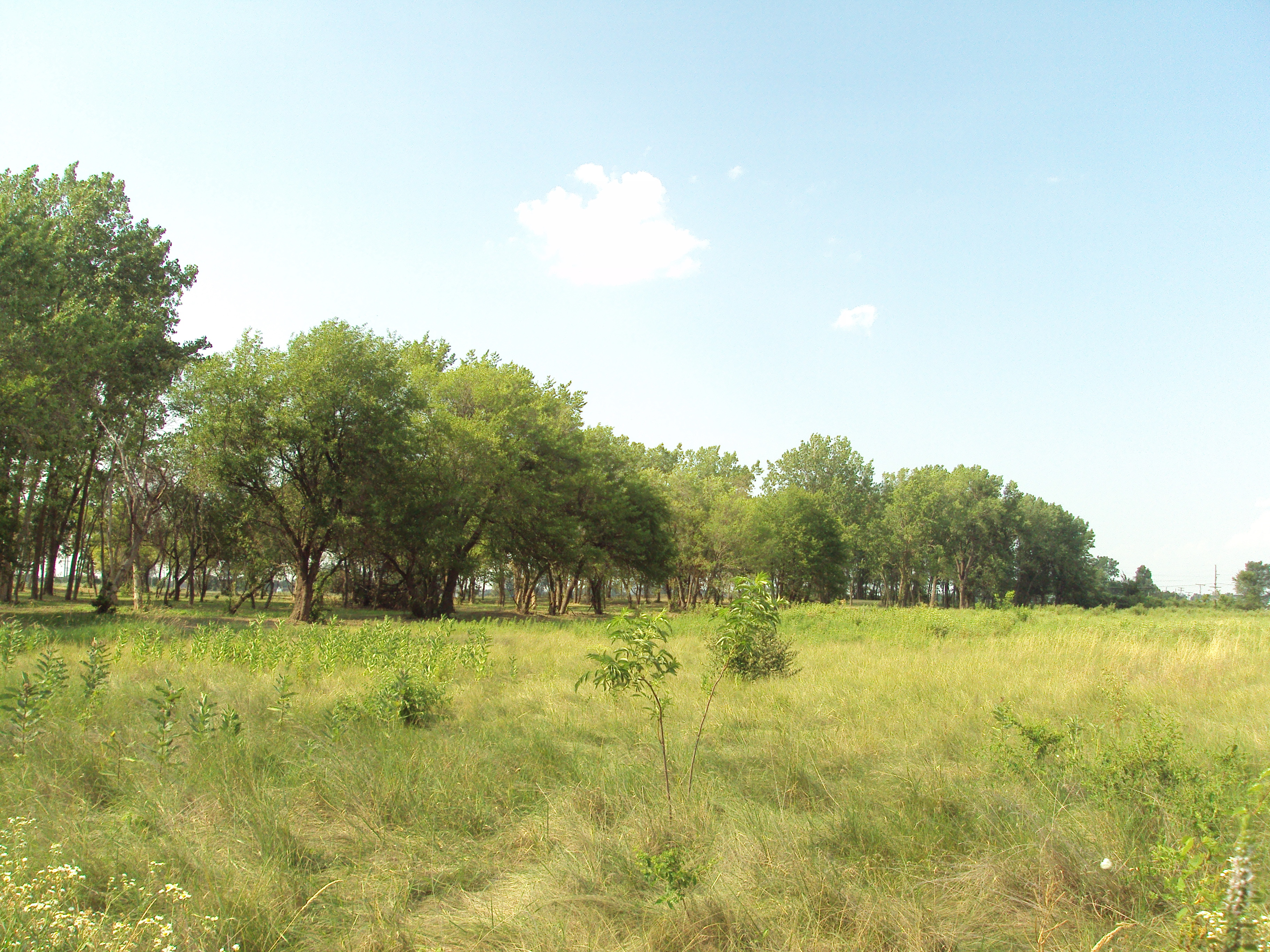
Public access to certain parts of the park is currently prohibited.

The River Raisin Battlefield Site was chosen to be included as a unit of the National Park System. The River Raisin National Battlefield Act (H.R. 401.IH), which was passed by the House of Representatives of the 111th Congress on January 9, 2009, said that the future national battlefield site would include land in both Monroe and Wayne counties that has been deemed significant to the Battle of Frenchtown.

The passing of the Omnibus Public Land Management Act on March 30, 2009, allocated the funding necessary to promote the site to the status of a National Battlefield Park. The park had been authorized as such but was not officially established until this bill was passed. It was included in the bill thanks to the work of Michigan natives and United States senators Carl Levin and Debbie Stabenow, as well as Congressman John Dingell, a history enthusiast. The site is only the fourth National Battlefield Park in the United States National Park System and is the only one commemorating the War of 1812. Battlefields, however, have been designated using various terms, even within the national park system. These include National Battlefield (without "Park" in the name), National Military Park, National Battlefield Site, National Historical Park, National Monument, and National Historic Site. River Raisin is the fifth national park unit in Michigan. Others include Isle Royale National Park, Keweenaw National Historical Park, Pictured Rocks National Lakeshore, and Sleeping Bear Dunes National Lakeshore; Father Marquette National Memorial is an affiliated unit.

The park is still being developed to meet National Park Service standards, with elements dependent on additional funding. The construction of and promotion of a national park typically takes eight years, which includes a variety of steps, such as land acquisition, funding, a management plan, and development of tourism facilities. However, since the county has already preserved and managed the battlefield site, this process took considerably less time. Some areas have yet to be restored to landscapes of the era of the battle.

The battlefield site is expected to generate a positive economic effect in tourism. Projected attendance to the park upon its completion was estimated to range from 20,000 to 25,000 visitors a year, but during the 2012 fiscal year, the battlefield was visited by 52,027 people. The other three National Battlefield Parks, which all relate to the Civil War, receive more visitors, based on attendance figures from 2005: Kennesaw Mountain National Battlefield Park (1,005,510), Manassas National Battlefield Park (715,622), and Richmond National Battlefield Park (68,438).

In 2010 the battlefield park was connected to the nearby Sterling State Park through a newly completed nature trail, which is expected to increase the number of visitors in both parks. The president of the Monroe County Historical Society, William Braunlich, hoped to complete elements in the park before the bicentennial celebration of the Battle of Frenchtown on January 22, 2013. The site began operations as a national park unit on October 22, 2010.

In 2014, the park expanded by adding a disconnected coastal parcel that includes a historic corduroy road, a remnant of Hull's Trace, a military road that connected Fort Detroit to Ohio. The Hull's Trace Unit at the beginning of West Jefferson Avenue in Brownstown Township, about 13 miles northeast of the battlefield park, had been managed by Wayne County Parks, and is now cooperatively managed by Wayne County Parks and Recreation, U.S. Silica, and the Michigan Departments of Natural Resources and Environmental Quality. It is an unstaffed site.

Spurred in part by planned construction of the Gordie Howe International Bridge between Detroit and Windsor, historic Fort Wayne in Detroit was studied in 2017 and 2018 as a possible addition to the national park system, including as a unit of River Raisin National Battlefield Park. The National Park Service had previously assisted in identifying ways to preserve Fort Wayne and draw visitors.

The park also has a Museum which contains exhibits related to the battle, as well as huts and how people survived during the battle, shown by exhibits with Bear fur, Wolf fur, among other exhibits. The Museum also has a gift shop, and a Movie Theatre where visitors can watch movies and shows related to the battle.

== Historic markers ==
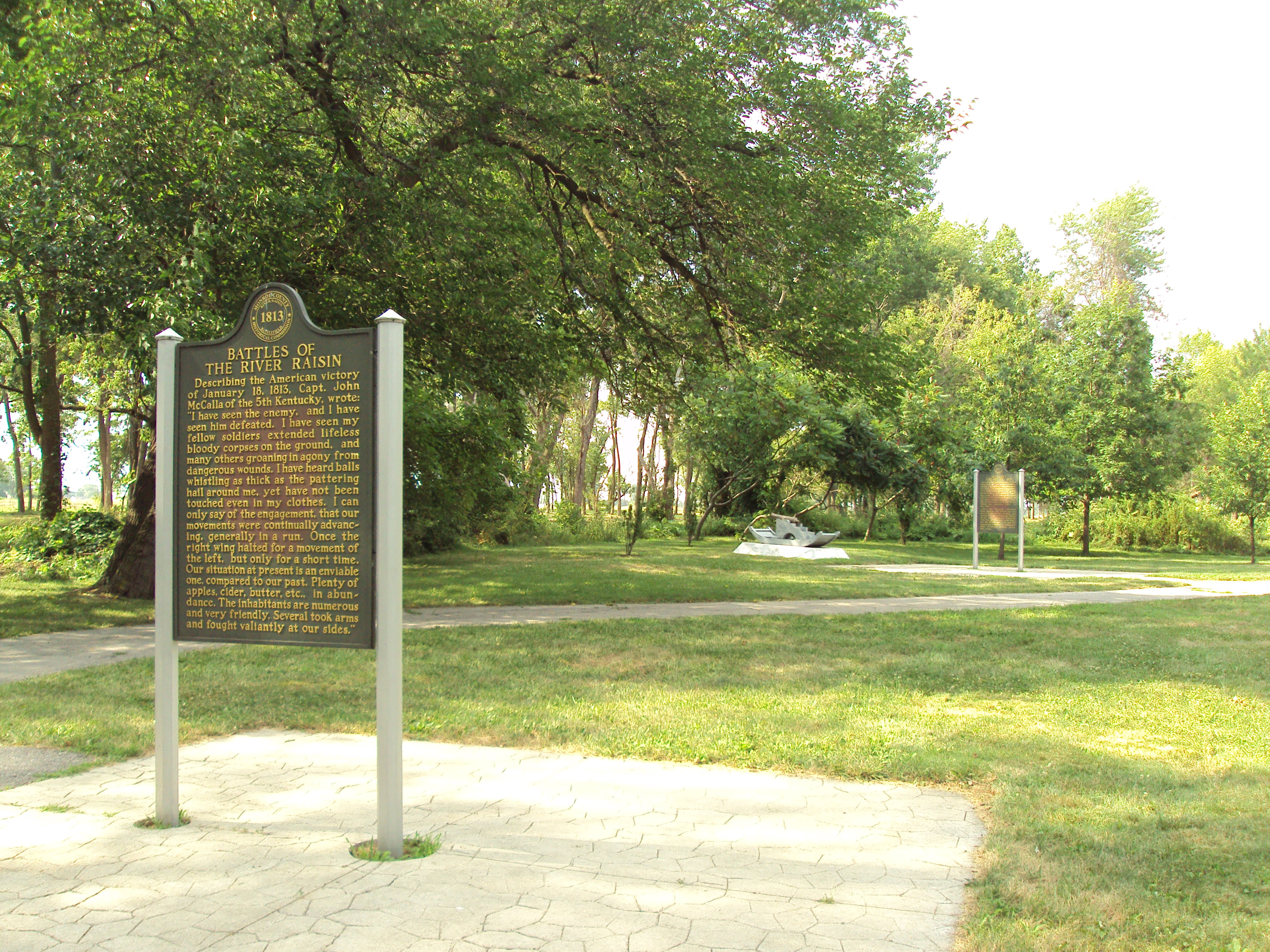

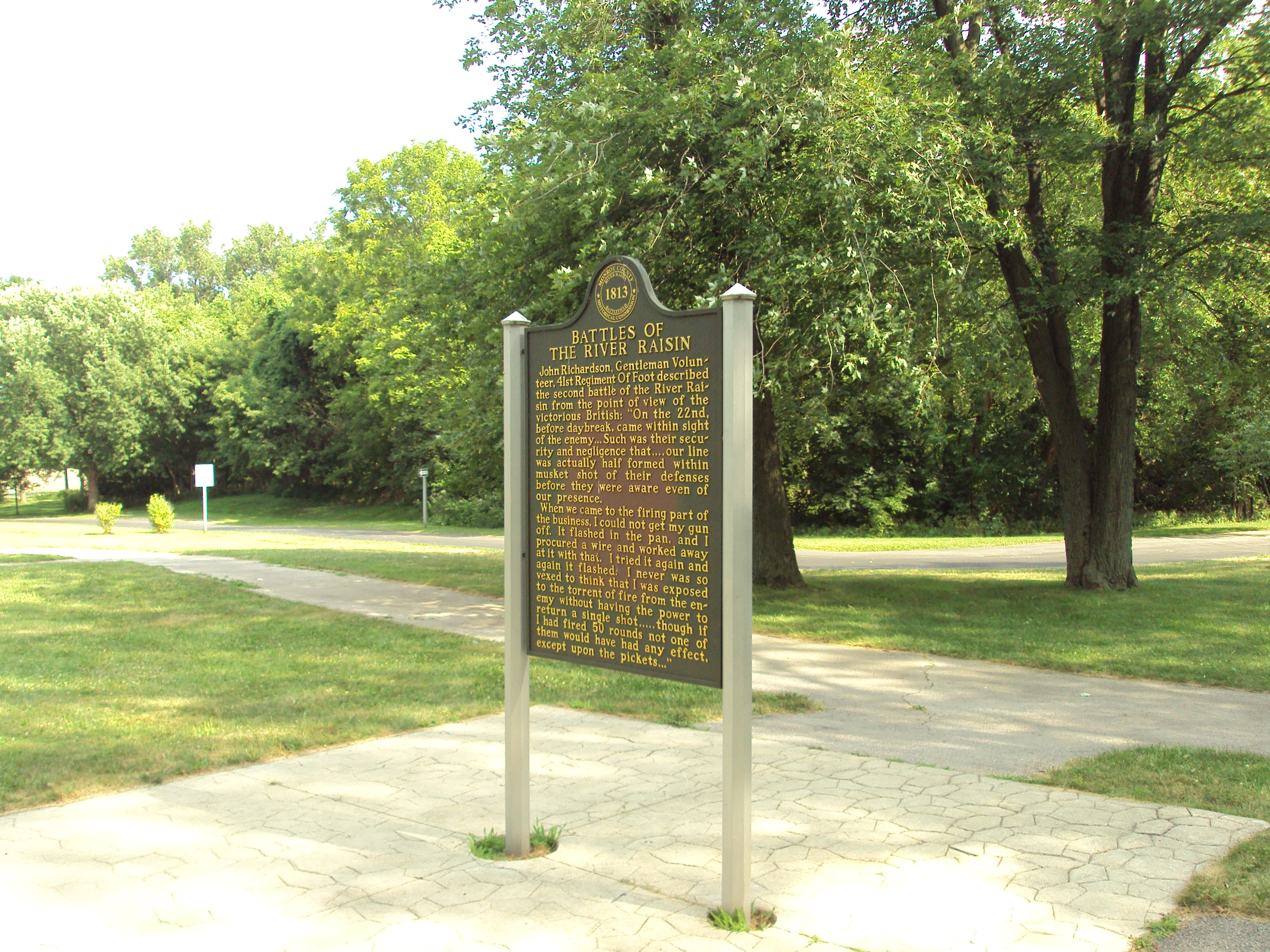

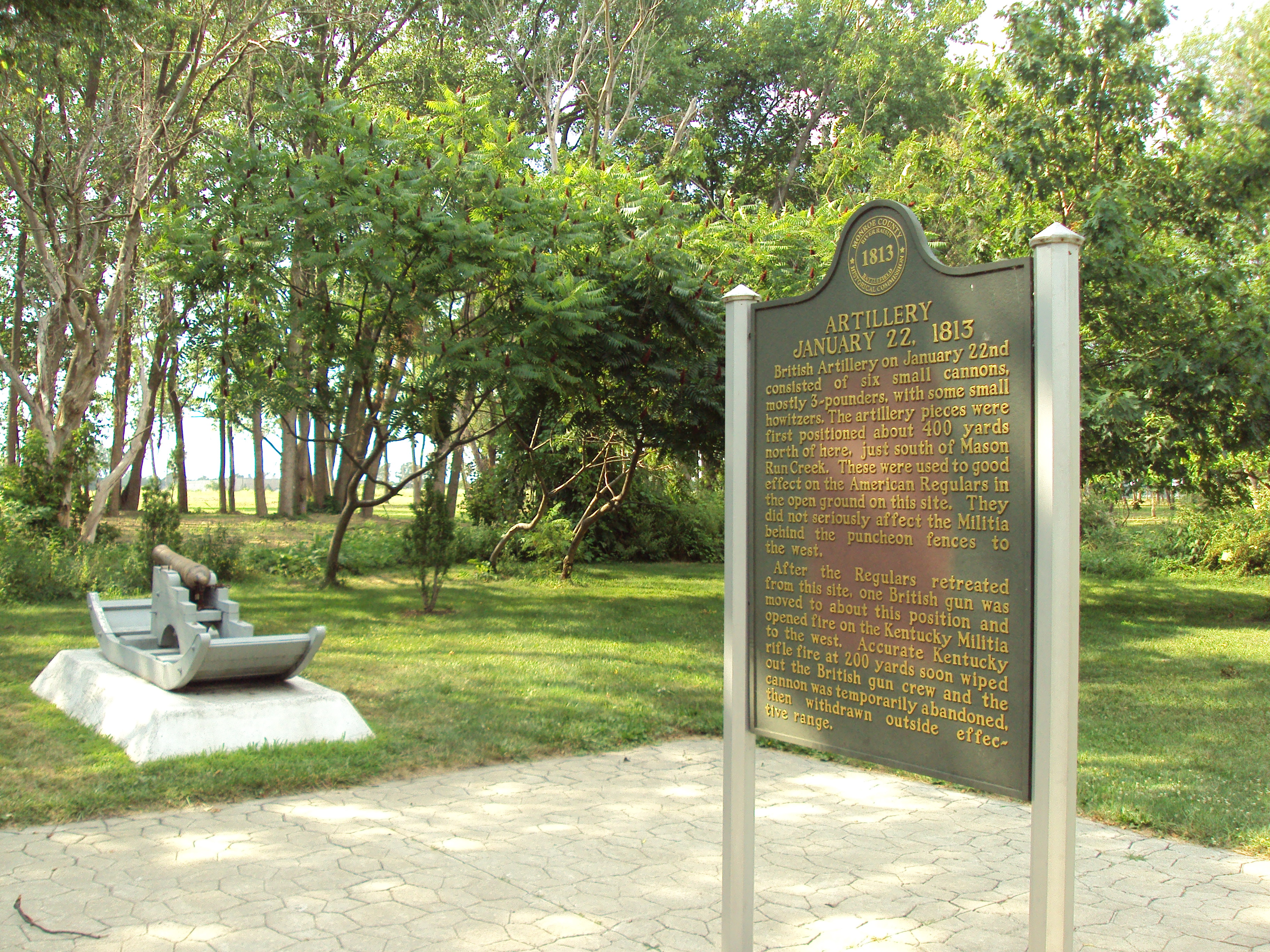

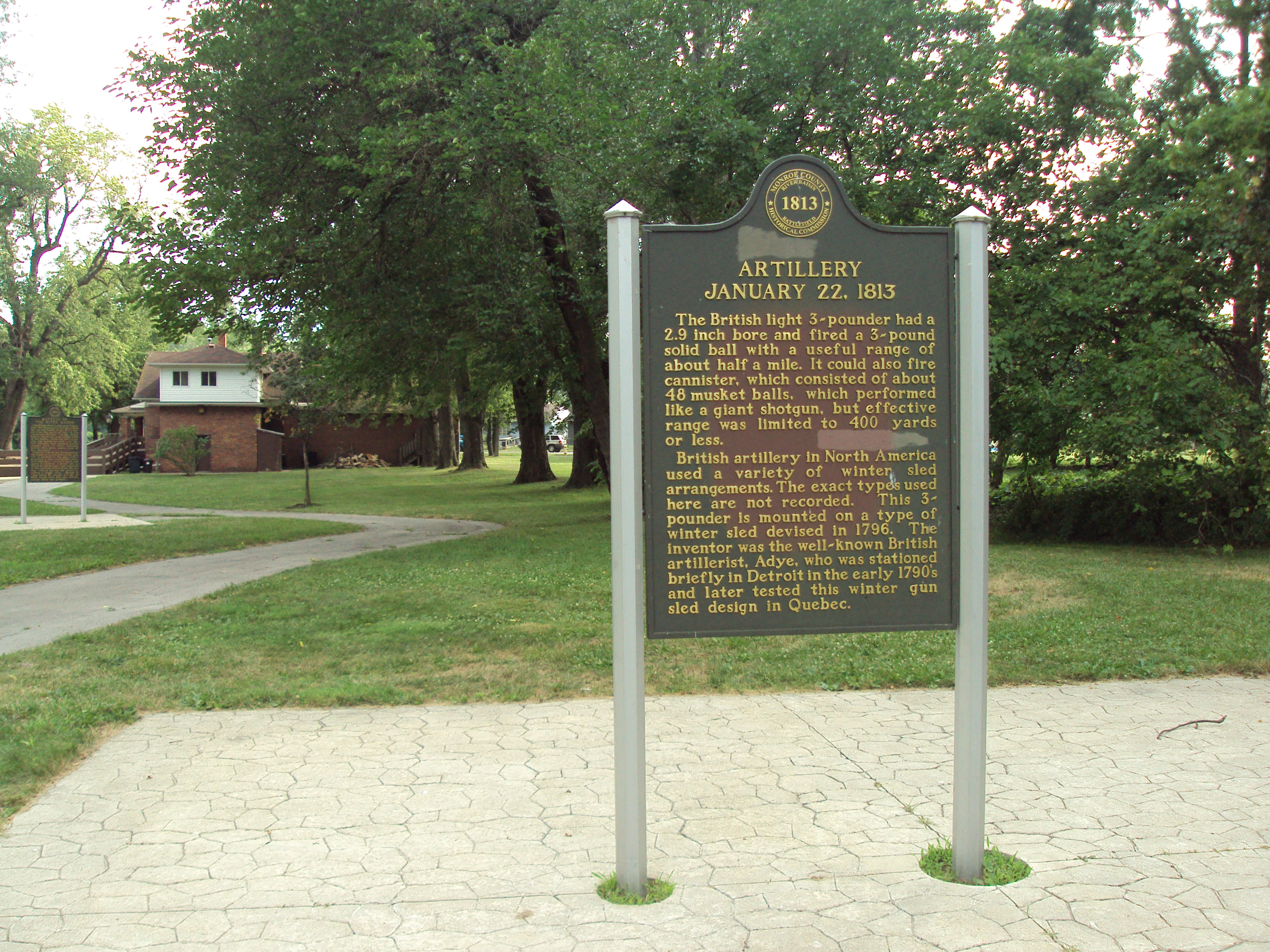

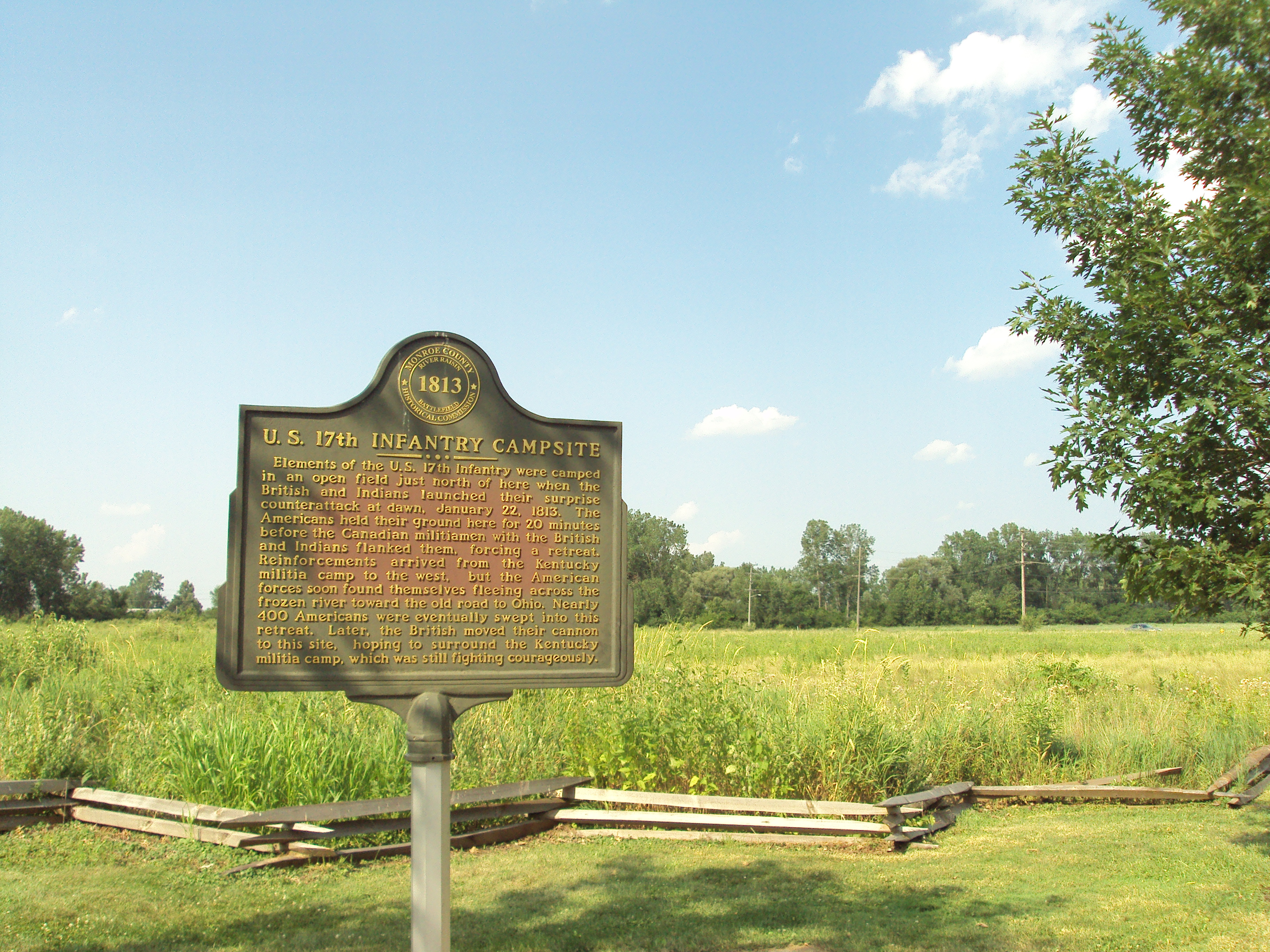

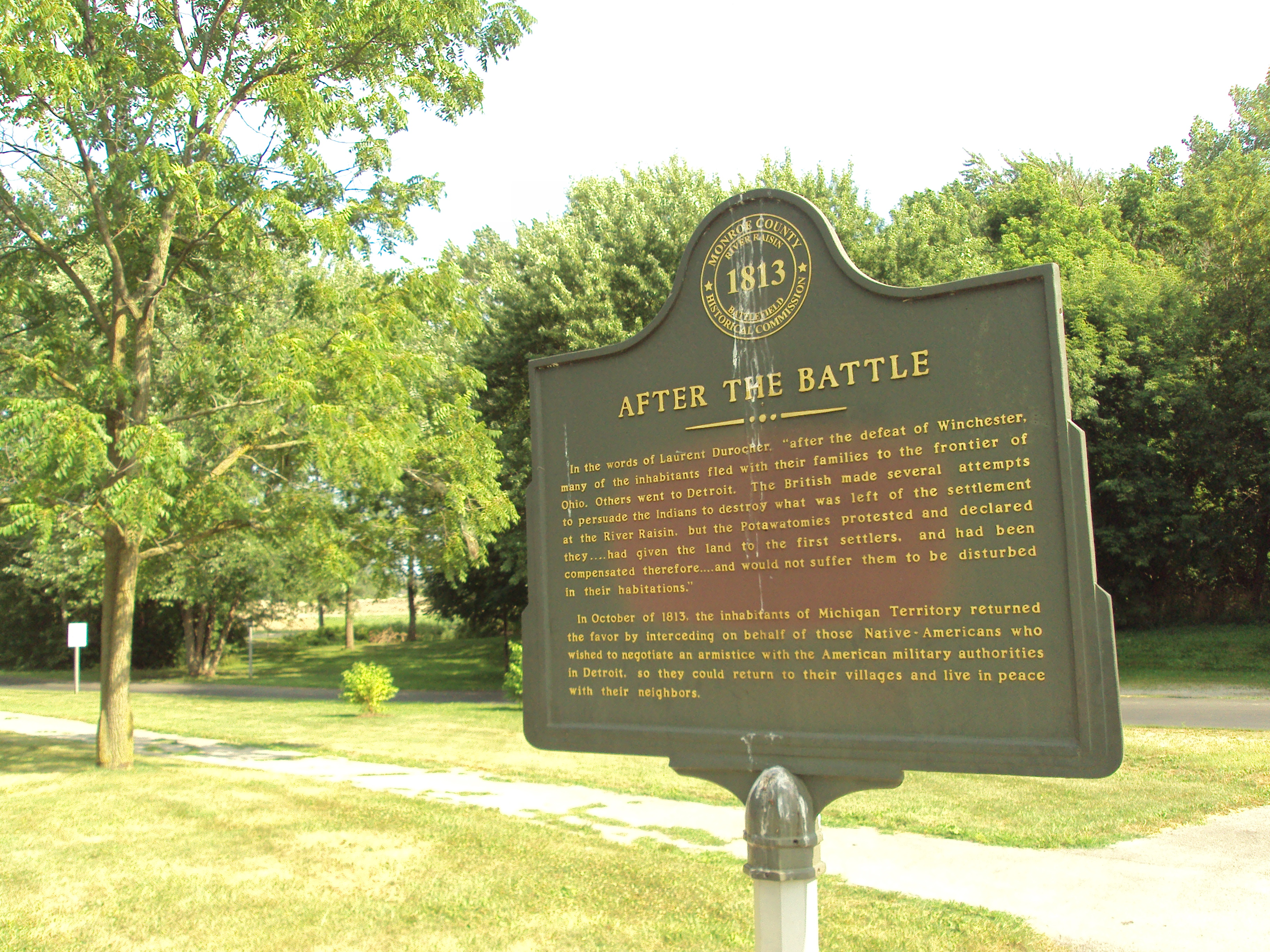

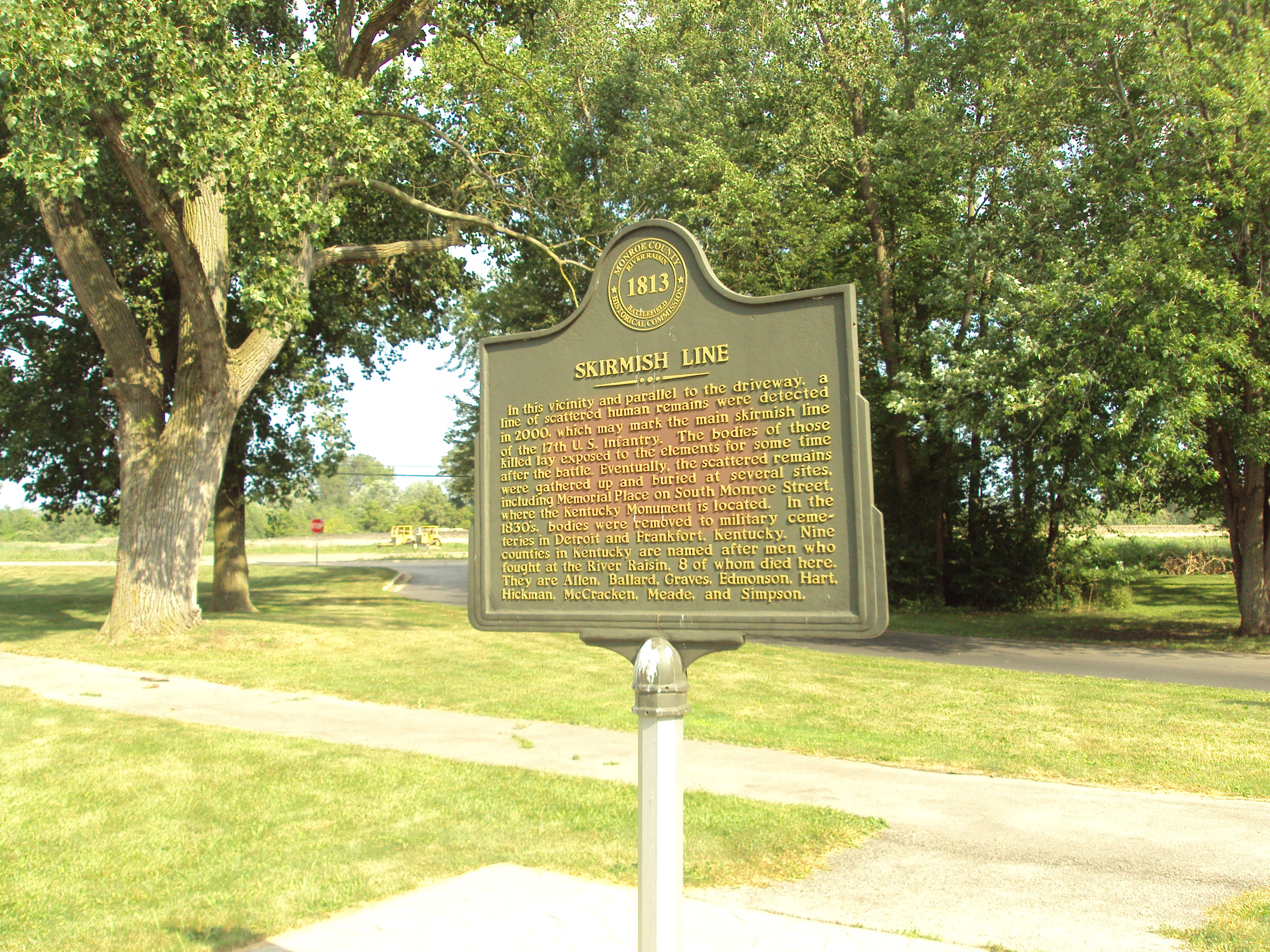

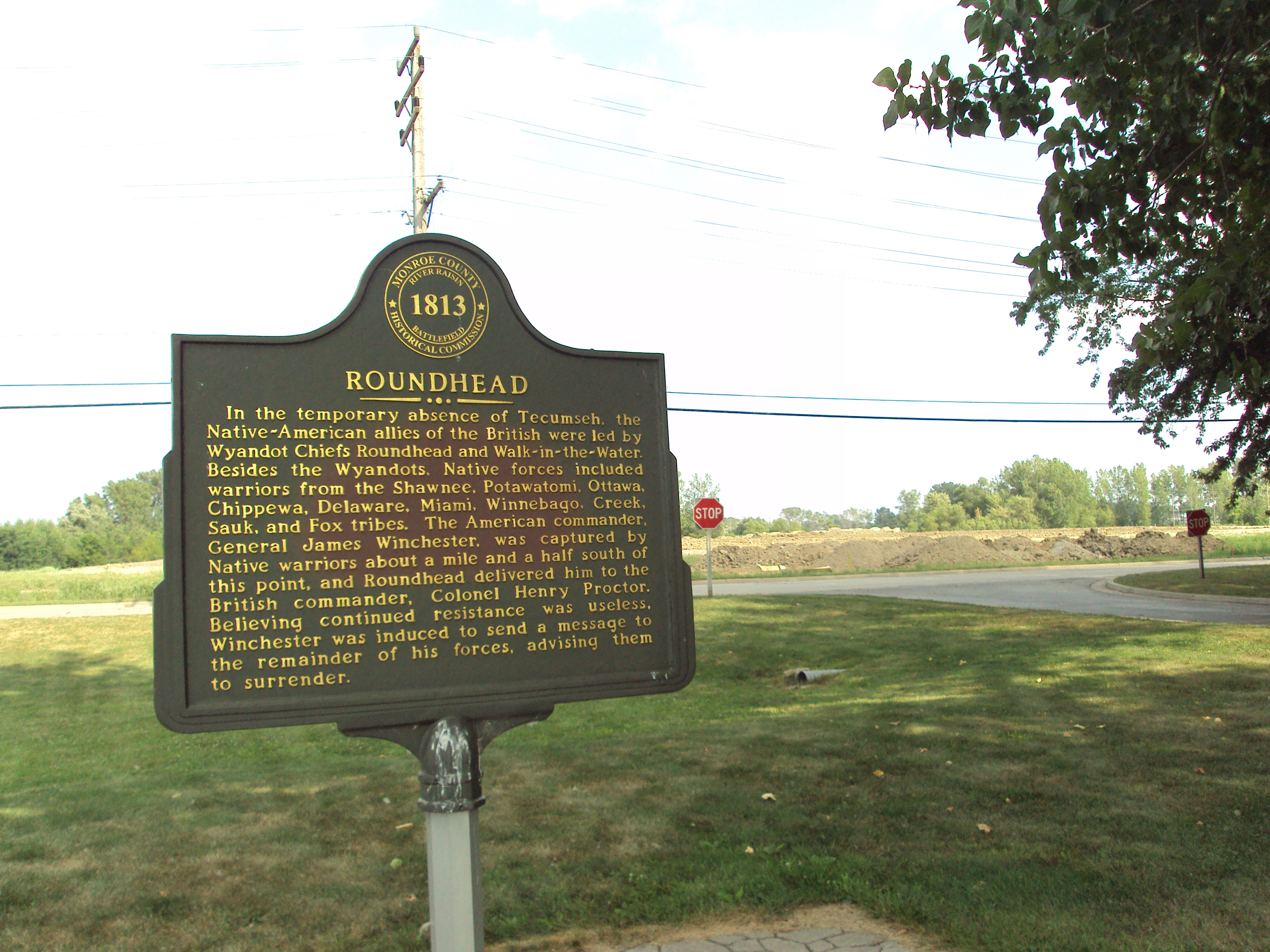
