= Hull's Trace North Huron River Corduroy Segment =

- U.S. National Register of Historic Places
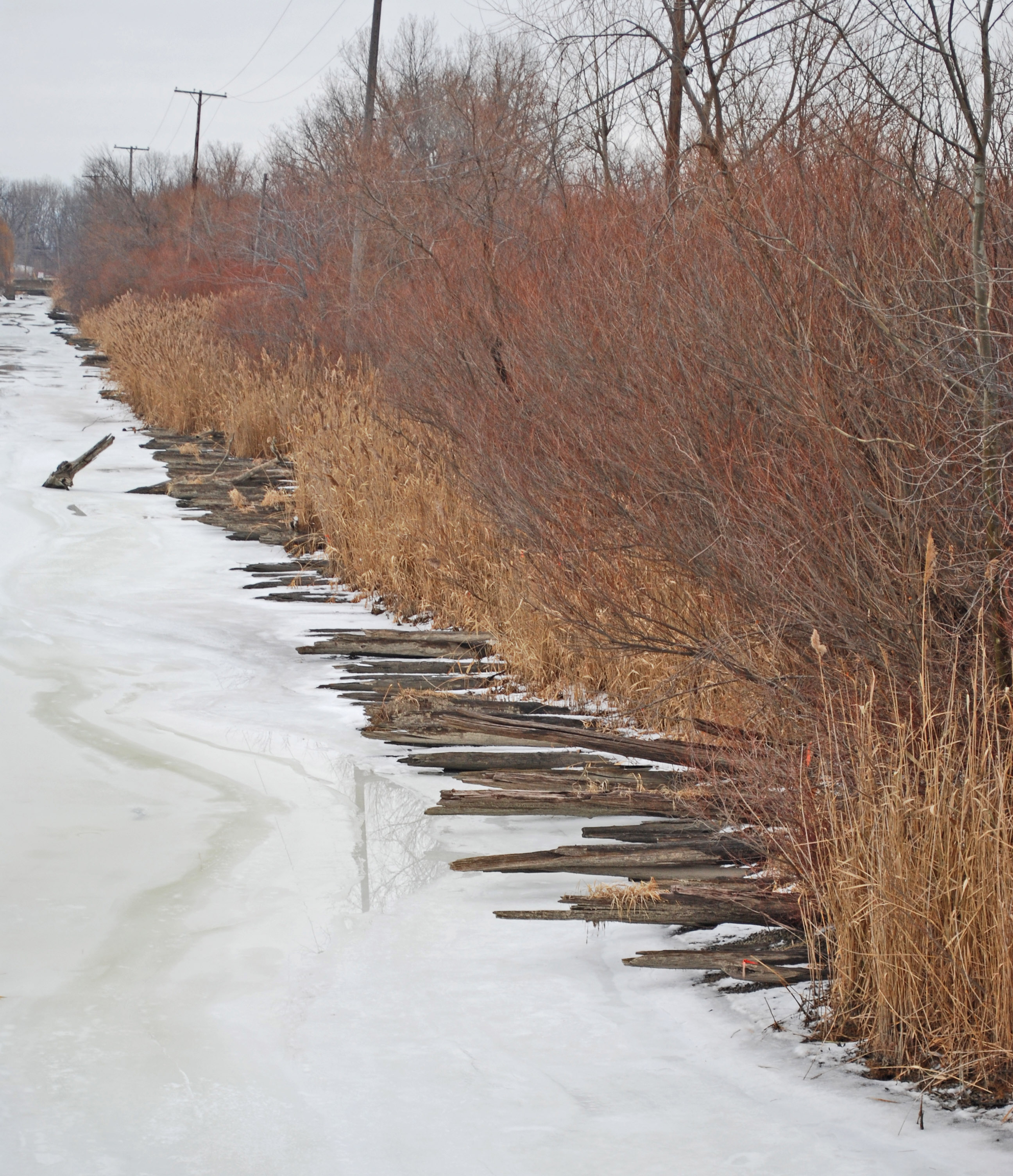
- Corduroy segment, image taken from Harbin Drive bridge looking north up Silver Creek

- Location within Michigan
- Interactive map
- Location: 36000 W Jefferson Ave, Brownstown Charter Township, Michigan
- Coordinates: 42°2′48″N 83°12′43″W
- Built: 1812
- Architect: William Hull
- Architectural style: Corduroy road
- NRHP reference No.: 10001022
- Added to NRHP: December 13, 2010

The Hull's Trace North Huron River Corduroy Segment is a portion of Hull's Trace (also called Hull's Trail), a military road running from Urbana, Ohio, to Detroit. Hull's Trace was one of the first federal and military roads in the United States. This segment, the only known extant portion of the Trace, contains the remains of a corduroy road, and is located at approximately 36000 W Jefferson Avenue in Brownstown Charter Township, Michigan. The North Huron River Corduroy Segment of Hull's Trace was listed on the National Register of Historic Places in 2010. As of 2014 it has been preserved and made accessible to the public as the Hulls Trace Unit of the River Raisin National Battlefield Park.

== History ==
At the beginning of the War of 1812, the United States was concerned about supplying Fort Detroit, then in American hands, and the surrounding Michigan Territory. Since Lake Erie was controlled by British forces, overland supply was the only option. In June and July 1812, troops under the command of General William Hull constructed what became known as "Hull's Trace," a 200-mile (320 km) military road running from Urbana, Ohio, to Fort Detroit. The section of road represented here was constructed on July 4, 1812. The original trace included a wooden bridge over the Huron River and segment of corduroy road on the north side of the bridge. The corduroy construction stabilized the marshy soil into a usable roadbed.

Hull's Trace ran close to both Lake Erie and the Detroit River, making it vulnerable to British attacks from the water. The first land-based skirmish of the war, the Battle of Brownstown, was fought on the road just north of this section of the road. The later battles of Maguaga and Frenchtown were also fought along the trace.

At the end of 1815, cognizant of the poor condition of interior roads and the adverse impact it had on the outcome of the War of 1812, General Andrew Jackson suggested building a military road from New Orleans to the Tennessee River. The United States Congress approved Jackson's suggestion in 1816; but work on the New Orleans road was not started until 1817. In 1816, troops began improving the section of Hull's Trace from Detroit to Fort Meigs, making it the first federally supported military road in the United States.

Support for these military roads gained steam, and in April 1818, the United States Congress instructed then-Secretary of War John C. Calhoun to form a plan "for the purpose of opening and constructing such roads and canals as may deserve and require the aid of the Government with a view to military operations in time of war." Calhoun's plan included the then-ongoing improvement of Hull's Trace from Detroit to Fort Meigs. The trace was renamed the "Great Military Road".

Major General Alexander Macomb was tasked with the work on the roadway. Around 150–200 soldiers worked to improve the roadway, and 1819 it was in a usable state. By 1822, the difficulties of maintaining the roadway through the low, wet land was apparent when it was "almost impossible for wagons (even in good weather)" and "in the fall and spring it [was] almost impossible to travel it on horseback". A replacement roadway was built by the military, one to three miles (1.6 to 4.8 km) inland starting in 1824 and completed in 1829.

The route eventually morphed into a civilian road, serving as a major link between Detroit and Toledo. Much of the trace became what is now known as West Jefferson Avenue. The replacement road, called the "United States Road", the "Detroit–Frenchtown Road" or the "Toledo & Detroit Turnpike" survives as River Road or US Turnpike in Monroe and Wayne counties.

== Description ==
The North Huron River Corduroy Segment of Hull's Trace is located along the west side of Jefferson Avenue, just north of the Jefferson Avenue–Huron River Bridge. This corduroy road segment consists of a series of logs oriented approximately horizontally, emerging from the Jefferson Avenue embankment near the water level of Silver Creek. Around 600 logs are included in the exposed section of the trace, spread out in a broken sequence over a distance of approximately 1,250 feet (380 m). Some logs still exhibit axe marks. The logs are of similar diameter and lie parallel to each other.

== Gallery ==
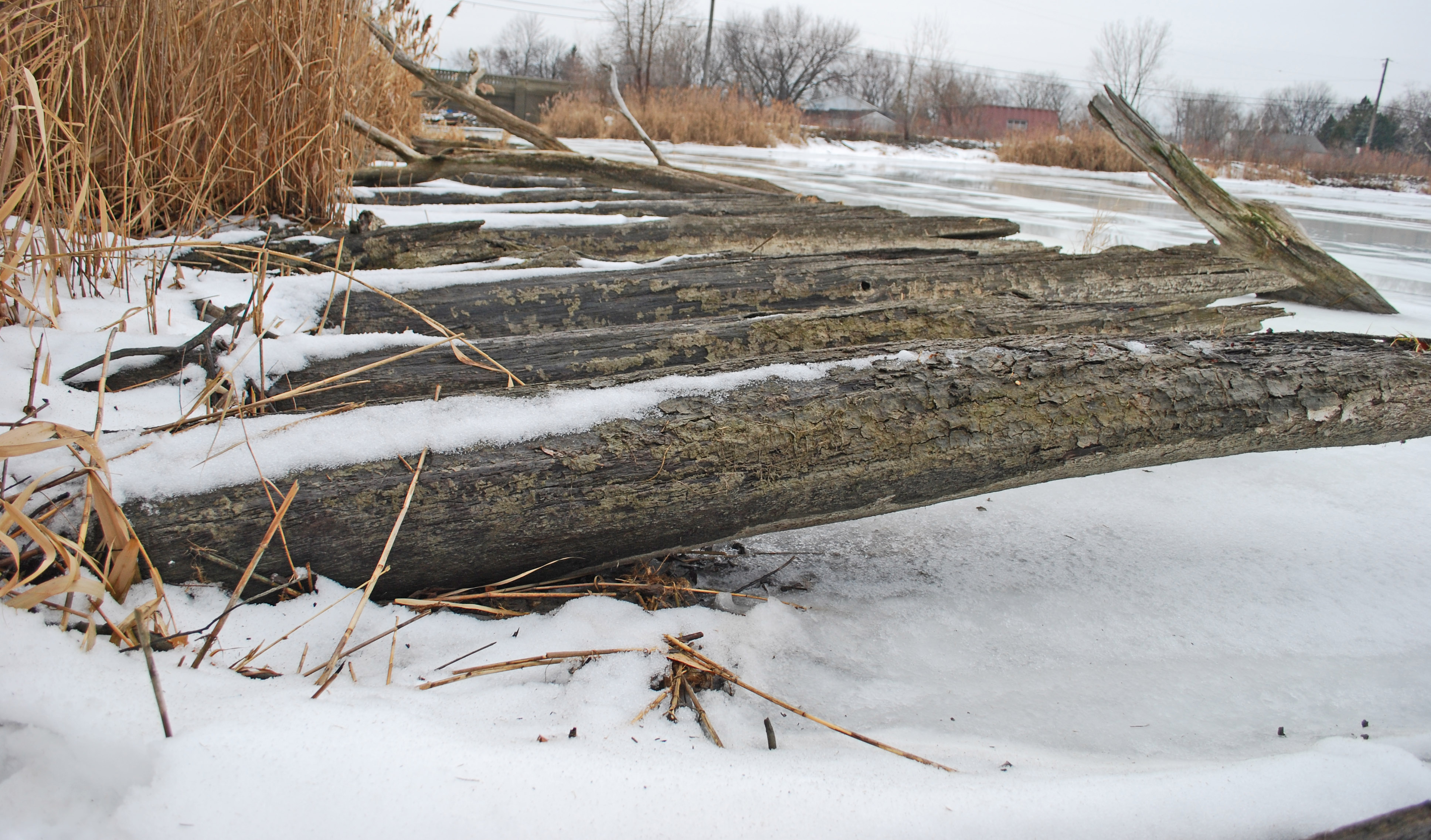
Picture taken at trace level, looking south toward Harbin Drive bridge

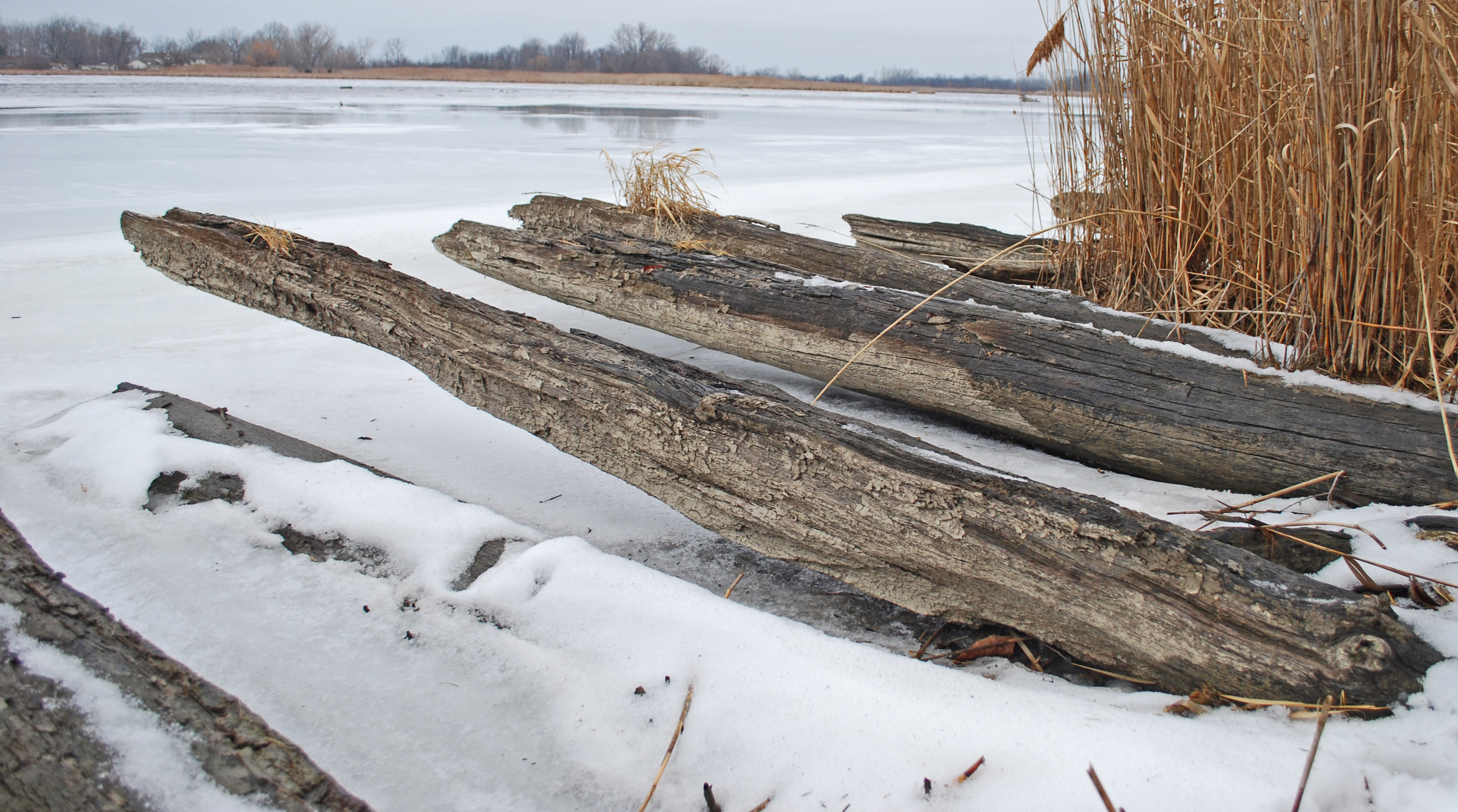
Picture taken at trace level, looking north

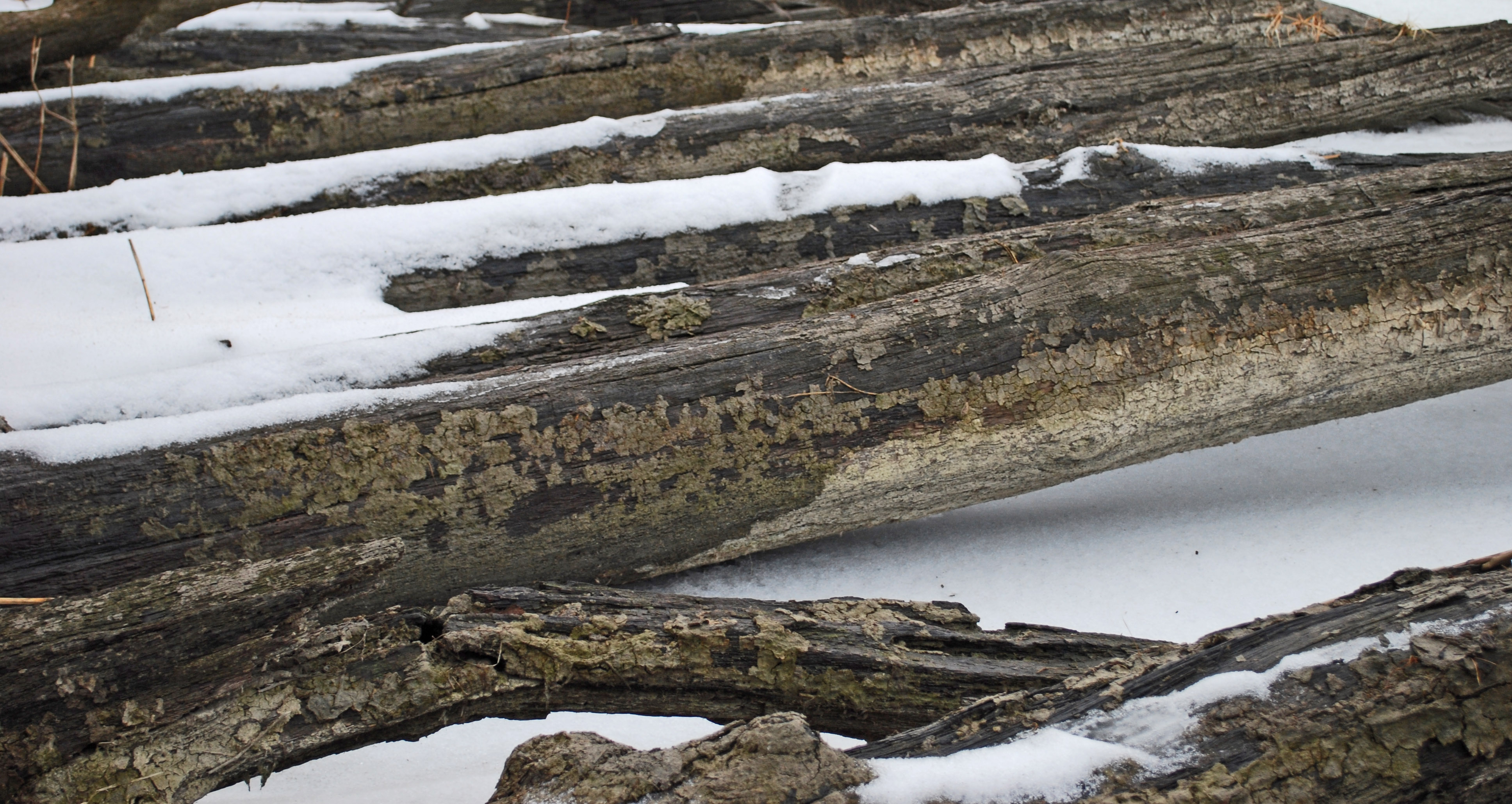
Close-up of logs in trace
