= Corduroy road =

Road made of logs perpendicular to the direction of travel

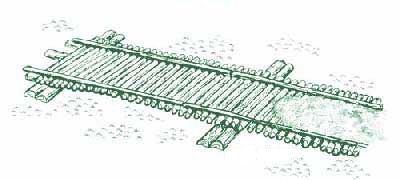
Corduroy road

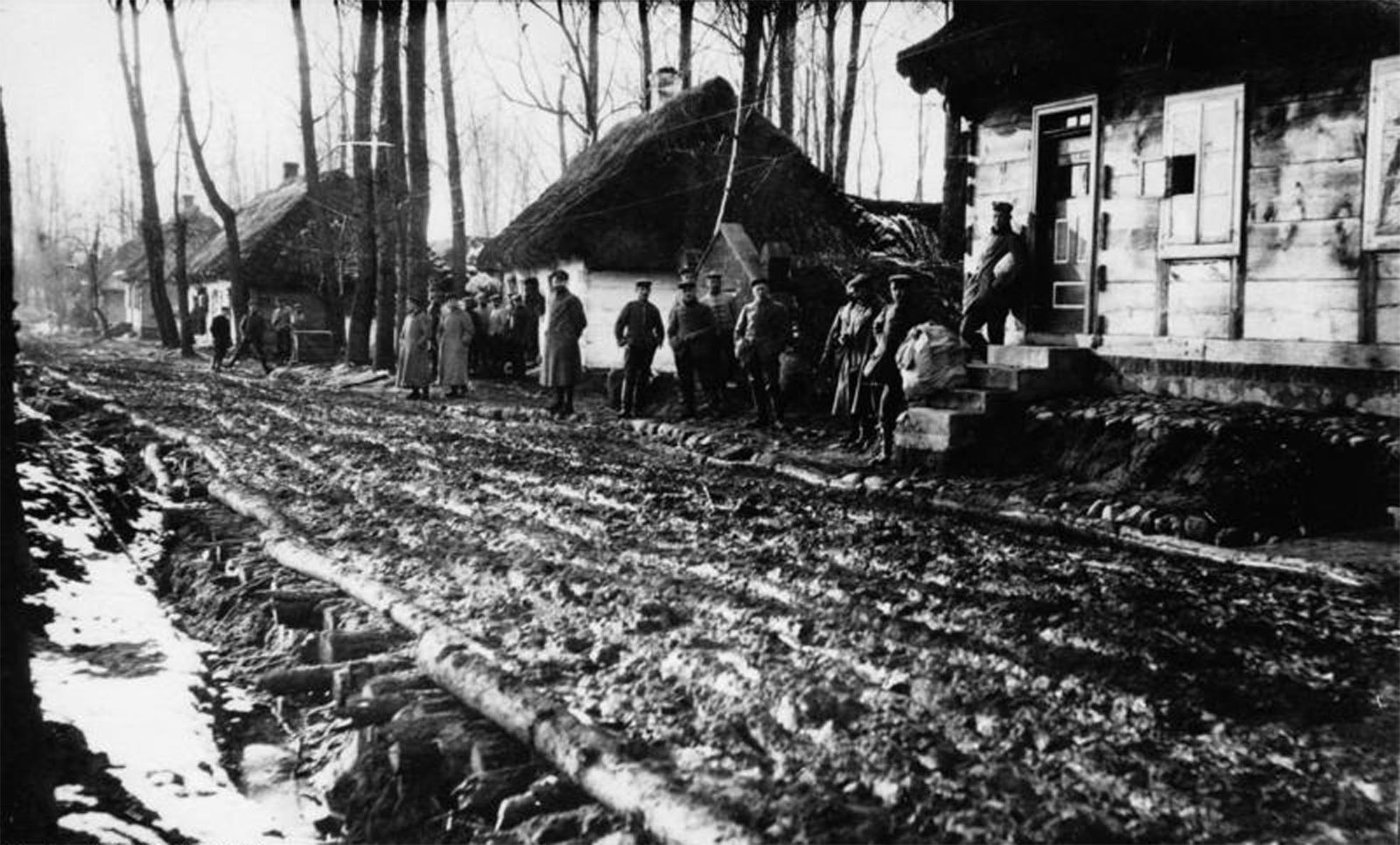
German soldiers by corduroy road in a Polesian village (Ukraine, 1918)

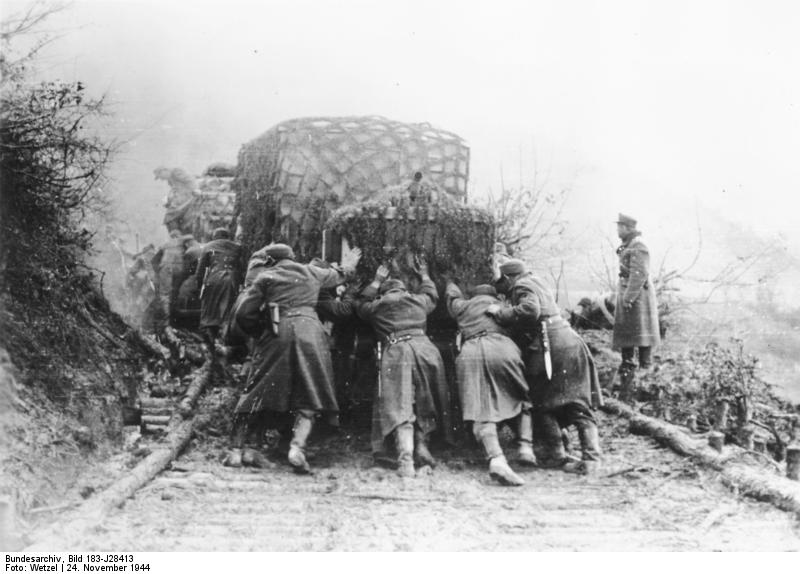
In war, corduroy roads are often used as an emergency measure where poor quality roads have been damaged by the large numbers of vehicles or troops that have passed over them. Seen here are Germans in Yugoslavia in 1944.

A corduroy road or log road is a type of road or timber trackway made by placing logs perpendicular to the direction of the road over a low or swampy area. This is an improvement from mud or dirt roads. However, they are still rough in the best of conditions, and the shifting logs can pose a hazard for horses.

Corduroy roads can also be built as a foundation for other surfacing. If the logs are buried in wet, acidic, anaerobic soils such as peat or muskeg, they decay very slowly. A few corduroy road foundations that date back to the early 20th century still exist in North America. One example is the Alaska Highway between Burwash Landing and Koidern, Yukon, Canada, which was rebuilt in 1943, less than a year after the original route was graded on thin soil and vegetation over permafrost, by using corduroy, then building a gravel road on top. During the 1980s, the gravel was covered with a chip-seal. The late 1990s saw replacement of this road with modern road construction, including rerouting of the entire highway.

In World War II corduroyed roads were used by both German and Soviet forces on the Eastern Front.

In slang use, corduroy road can also refer to a road in ill repair, having many potholes, ruts, or surface swellings. This should not be confused with a washboard road.

== Historical uses ==
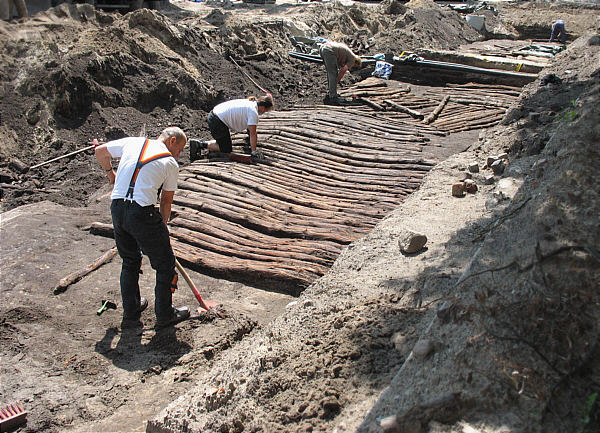
Excavation of a corduroy road from the 16th century in Oranienburg, Germany

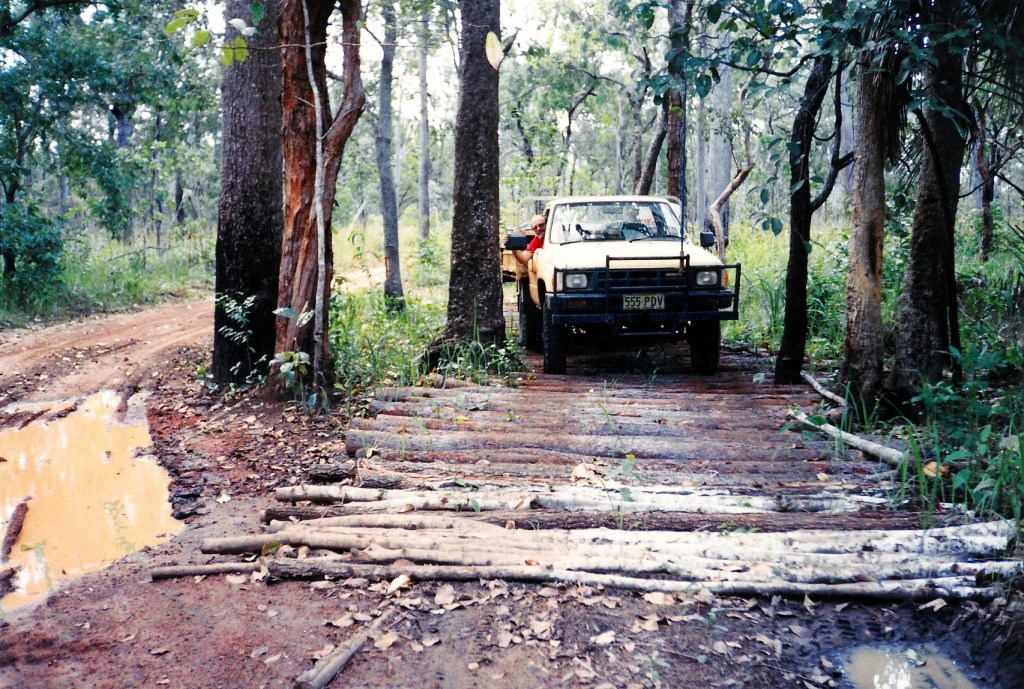
Corduroy road in wet season Cape York Peninsula, Australia. 1990

The earliest recorded use of a corduroy road in England was during the Norman attack on Saxon resistance leader Hereward the Wake who had taken refuge in the marshes on the Isle of Ely. Two contemporary sources say that the Normans built a corduroy road one mile long to try to reach him in 1071 but eventually succeeded in their attack using treachery.

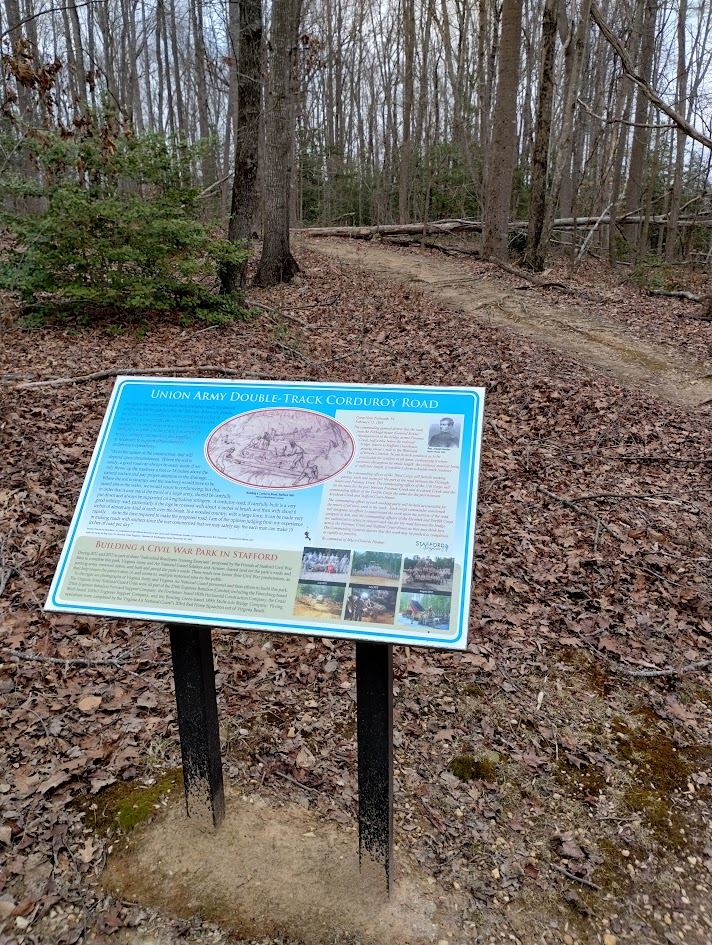
Site of Union Army double track corduroy road used during the American Civil War, Stafford, Virginia, February 2024.

Corduroy roads were used extensively in the American Civil War between Shiloh and Corinth after the Battle of Shiloh, and in Sherman's march through the Carolinas.

In the Pacific Northwest, roads built of spaced logs similar to widely spaced "army track" were the mainstay of local logging practices and were called skid roads. Two of these, respectively on the outskirts of the mill towns of Seattle and Vancouver, which had become concentrations of bars and logger's slums, were the origin of the more widespread meaning of "skid road" and its derivative skid row, referring to a poor area.

Hull's Trace North Huron River Corduroy Segment is a section of corduroy road in Brownstown, Michigan that is on public display at the River Raisin National Battlefield Park. This segment is the only known extant portion of Hull's Trace, a military road that was built at the beginning of the War of 1812 from Urbana, Ohio, to Detroit.

By the early 1800s, a corduroy road had been built along what is now King Street in Waterloo, Ontario in Canada; its remains were unearthed under the roadway in 2016. The road was probably built by Mennonite settlers between the late 1790s and 1816. A historian explained that the road had been built for access to a mill but was also "one of the first roads cut through (the woods) so people could start settling the area".

== Similar types of road ==
The puncheon or plank road uses hewn boards instead of logs, resulting in a smoother and safer surface.

== Name ==
The name "corduroy road" refers to the road's ridged appearance similar to corduroy fabric.

== See also ==
- Boardwalk
- Corduroy Road Remains
- Footbridge
