= Woodhaven-Brownstown School District =

School district in Michigan

Address
- 24821 Hall Road Woodhaven, Wayne, Michigan, 48183; United States

District information
- Grades: PreK-12
- Established: 1968; 58 years ago
- Superintendent: Matthew Sallah
- Schools: 10
- Budget: US$105,137,000 (2022-2023)
- NCES District ID: 2636485

Students and staff
- Students: 5,688 (2024-2025)
- Teachers: 340.3 FTE (2024-2025)
- Staff: 718.88 FTE (2024-2025)
- Student–teacher ratio: 16.71 (2024-2025)

Other information
- Website: www.mywbsd.org

The Woodhaven-Brownstown School District is a public school district in Wayne County, Michigan in Metro Detroit. It serves parts of Woodhaven, Brownstown Township, Flat Rock, Huron Township, and Romulus.

== History ==
The Woodhaven-Brownstown School District was founded in 1968. Before the district was in place, students attended Bates Elementary until seventh grade and then attended Trenton Public Schools. In the late 1960s the Carson School District, the Hand School District, and the Maple Grove School District and the Brownstown #10 School District were ordered by court to join together to form one school district which offered grades K-12. The school district was then renamed to the Woodhaven-Brownstown School District.

== Schools ==
=== Elementary schools ===
There are five elementary schools in the Woodhaven-Brownstown School District. All of the elementary schools offer grades K–4.

==== Bates Elementary School ====
Bates Elementary was founded by Raymond G. Bates in September 1957. Bates is located on 22811 Gudith Road. The principal of Bates is C. Godfrey.

==== Erving Elementary School ====
Erving Elementary was named after Mary Quick Erving. She had served on the first school board in 1924 and continued to serve for 22 more years. Erving Elementary is located on 24175 Hall Road and opened in the mid 1970's and renovated in 2007.The principal is Mrs. C. Berry.

==== Gudith Elementary School ====
Gudith Elementary was named after the Gudith family. John Gudith was involved in school board matters for 29 years and William Gudith was involved for 38 years. The site of the elementary school was the original site of the Gudith's family home. Gudith Elementary is located at 22700 Sibley Road and opened in 1973 and renovated in 2007.The principal is Mr. T. Martin.

==== Wegienka Elementary School ====
Wegienka Elementary was named in honor of Mark Wegienka. After completing his formal education, Mr. Wegienka entered the education profession at Eurekadale School in 1941. In 1943, he was named teacher-principal of Hand School, and became superintendent of that district in 1954. In 1968, Mr. Wegienka was appointed first superintendent of the newly formed Woodhaven School District, a post he held until his retirement in 1976. Wegienka is located at 23925 Arsenal Road and opened in 1978 and renovated in 2007.The principal is Mrs. M. Briegel.

==== Yake Elementary School ====
Yake Elementary was named after Elin Christine Yake who was an immigrant from Sweden. She was very active in the schools and helped get Bates Elementary built. Yake Elementary is located at 16400 Carter Road and opened in 1971 and renovated in 2007.The principal is Mr. T. Podlewski.

=== Middle schools ===
There are two middle schools in the Woodhaven-Brownstown school district. Brownstown Middle School offers grades 7–8. It is located at 20135 Inkster Road, it opened in the 1990's and renovated in 2004 and 2022.Its principal is Mr. A. Clark.

The other middle school is Woodhaven Upper Elementary (formerly Patrick Henry Middle School) which offers grades 5–6. Woodhaven Upper Elementary is located at 24825 Hall Road, and it opened in 1976 and was renovated in 2004. Its principal is Mr. R. Gurganus.

=== High school ===
Woodhaven High School opened in the Fall of 1972. It is located at 24787 Van Horn Road. Its principal is Mr. Jay Vesperman, who had been an assistant principal at WHS since 2008. In 2022, the class of 1972 was honored at the Homecoming football game for the 50th anniversary of the school.

==== Alternative Education ====
Maple Grove Alternative High School provides an online learning program with in-person tutoring that allows students to earn a high school diploma while completing most of their work on a computer at home. In school operations are held at Woodhaven High School.
