= Woodhaven High School =

High school in Wayne County, Michigan, United States

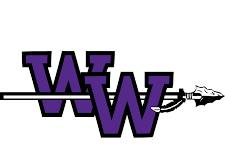

Location
- 24787 Van Horn Road; Brownstown, Michigan 48134; United States; 42°07′20″N 83°16′18″W

Information
- Type: Public secondary
- Established: 1972
- School district: Woodhaven-Brownstown School District
- Principal: Jay Vesperman
- Teaching staff: 94.73 (FTE)
- Grades: 9–12
- Enrollment: 1,629 (2024–2025)
- Student to teacher ratio: 17.20
- Colors: Purple and white
- Mascot: Warriors
- Newspaper: The Purple Pulse
- Website: www.mywbsd.org/o/whs

Student assessments
- 2021–22 school year Change vs. prior year

M-STEP 11th grade proficiency rates (Science / Social Studies)
- Advanced %: 7.2 / 11.5
- Proficient %: 20.2 / 30.8
- PR. Proficient %: 13.5 / 49.9
- Not Proficient %: 59.1 / 7.8

Average test scores
- SAT Total: 981.2 (▼ −14.2)

Woodhaven High School is a public high school in Brownstown Charter Township, Michigan, and located within the Woodhaven-Brownstown School District. The school had an enrollment of 1,629 as of the 2024-2025 school year, and in the 2024-2025 school year, it now serves grades 9–12. Woodhaven's mascot is the Warrior and the school colors are purple and white. Woodhaven High School competes in the Downriver League, an athletic association consisting of Woodhaven and 8 other Downriver area high schools.

== Notable alumni ==
- Eric Lynch (Class of 1988) - NFL running back.
- Jeremy Smith (Class of 2007) - NHL goaltender. Currently playing for Kunlun Red Star of the Kontinental Hockey League.
- Matheson Iacopelli (Class of 2012) - American Hockey League and ECHL player.
