= Jefferson Avenue–Huron River and Harbin Drive–Silver Creek Canal Bridges =

- Jefferson Avenue-Huron River and Harbin Drive-Silver Creek Canal Bridges
- U.S. National Register of Historic Places
- Michigan State Historic Site
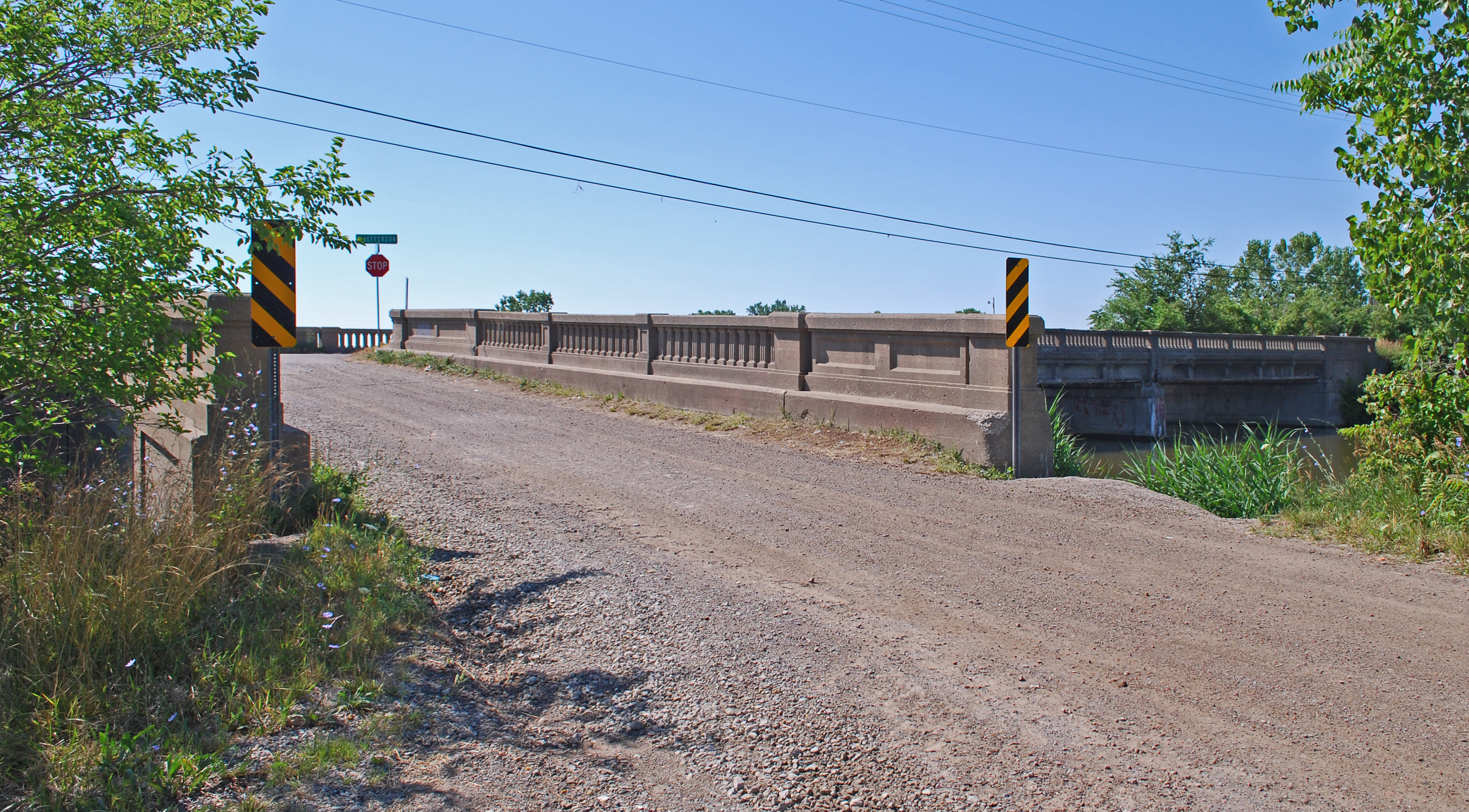

- Location within Michigan Location within the United States
- Interactive map
- Location: West Jefferson Avenue over Huron River and Harbin Dr. over Silver Creek Canal; Berlin and Brownstown, MI
- Coordinates: 42°02′32″N 83°12′52″W
- Built: 1930
- Architect: Michigan State Highway Department
- MPS: Highway Bridges of Michigan MPS
- NRHP reference No.: 00000080
- Added to NRHP: February 10, 2000

The Jefferson Avenue–Huron River and Harbin Drive–Silver Creek Canal Bridges are two separate bridges, sharing a continuous railing, that were jointly listed on the National Register of Historic Places on February 10, 2000.

The Jefferson Avenue Bridge carries West Jefferson Avenue (known south of the river as the U.S. Turnpike) across the Huron River, which connects Brownstown Charter Township in Wayne County to Berlin Charter Township in Monroe County. Along with the Clinton–Kalamazoo Canal and Main Street Historic District, it is one of three properties listed on the National Register in Michigan to span two counties. (Note: Since the Jefferson Avenue Bridge spans both Wayne County and Monroe County, it is listed on both the NRHP listings in Wayne County and the NRHP listings in Monroe County articles but is only counted once for the total state listings.) The Harbin Drive Bridge is located entirely within Wayne County. Both bridges are located about one mile (0.6 km) inland from Lake Erie on a historically important route between Detroit and Toledo. The Jefferson Avenue Bridge is also designated as a Michigan Historic Site.

== Jefferson Avenue Bridge ==
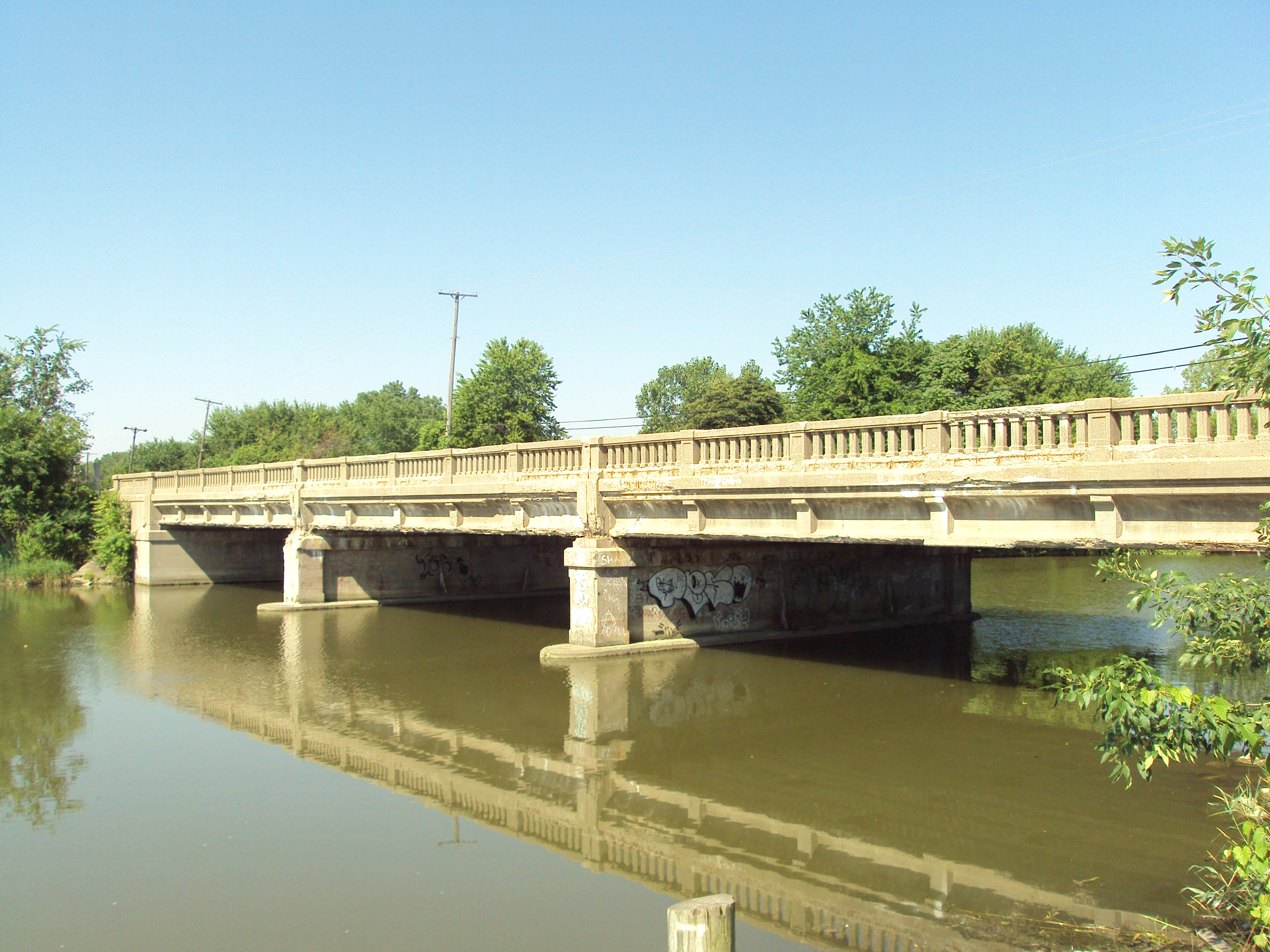
Jefferson Avenue Bridge

The larger of the two bridges is the three-span Jefferson Avenue Bridge. It is 165 feet (50 m) long and 36 feet (11 m) wide. It carries a two-lane road, known as West Jefferson Avenue north of the river and as the U.S. Turnpike south of the river. It was built in 1930 by the Michigan Department of Transportation and replaced an earlier hand drawn swing bridge. The new beam bridge was built high enough to ensure it could remain stationary and still allow small vessels to pass beneath it. Due to its age, the bridge's structure has deteriorated in recent years, but the driving road surface was repaired as recently as 2016.

== Harbin Drive Bridge ==
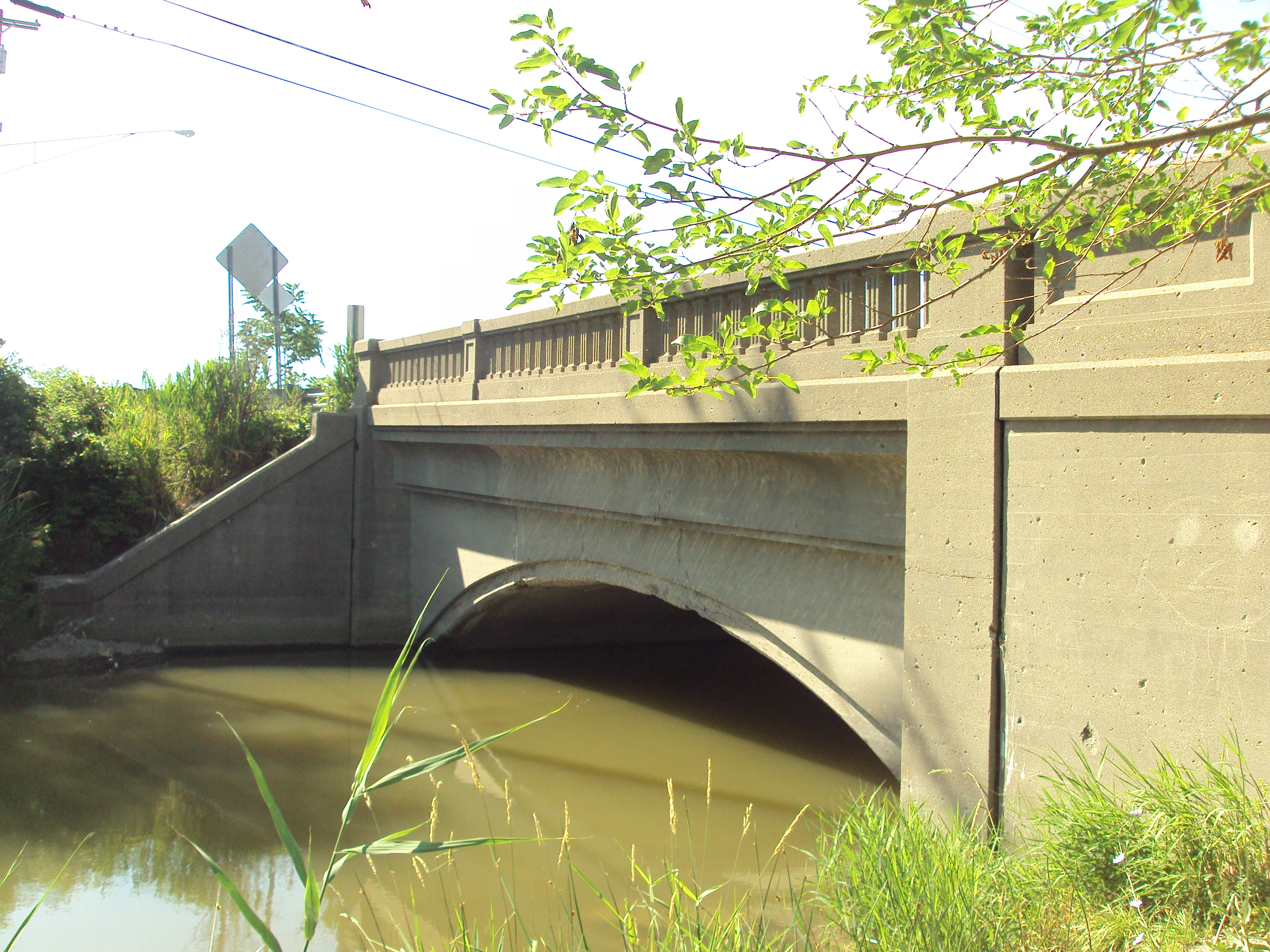
Harbin Drive Bridge

The Harbin Drive Bridge is a much smaller bridge at only 45 feet (14 m) long and 27 feet (8.2 m) wide. It carries the sparsely traveled Harbin Drive over the Silver Creek Canal, which drains into the Huron River. It is located just north of the Jefferson Avenue Bridge, and the two are connected by a continuous railing. The Harbin Drive Bridge was actually constructed a few years earlier than the Jefferson Avenue Bridge, although this exact construction date is unknown. Harbin Drive is a gravel road that connects a few residential dwellings on a narrow island in the river.
