= Brownstown Charter Township, Michigan =

Brownstown Township, Michigan
- Charter township
- Charter Township of Brownstown
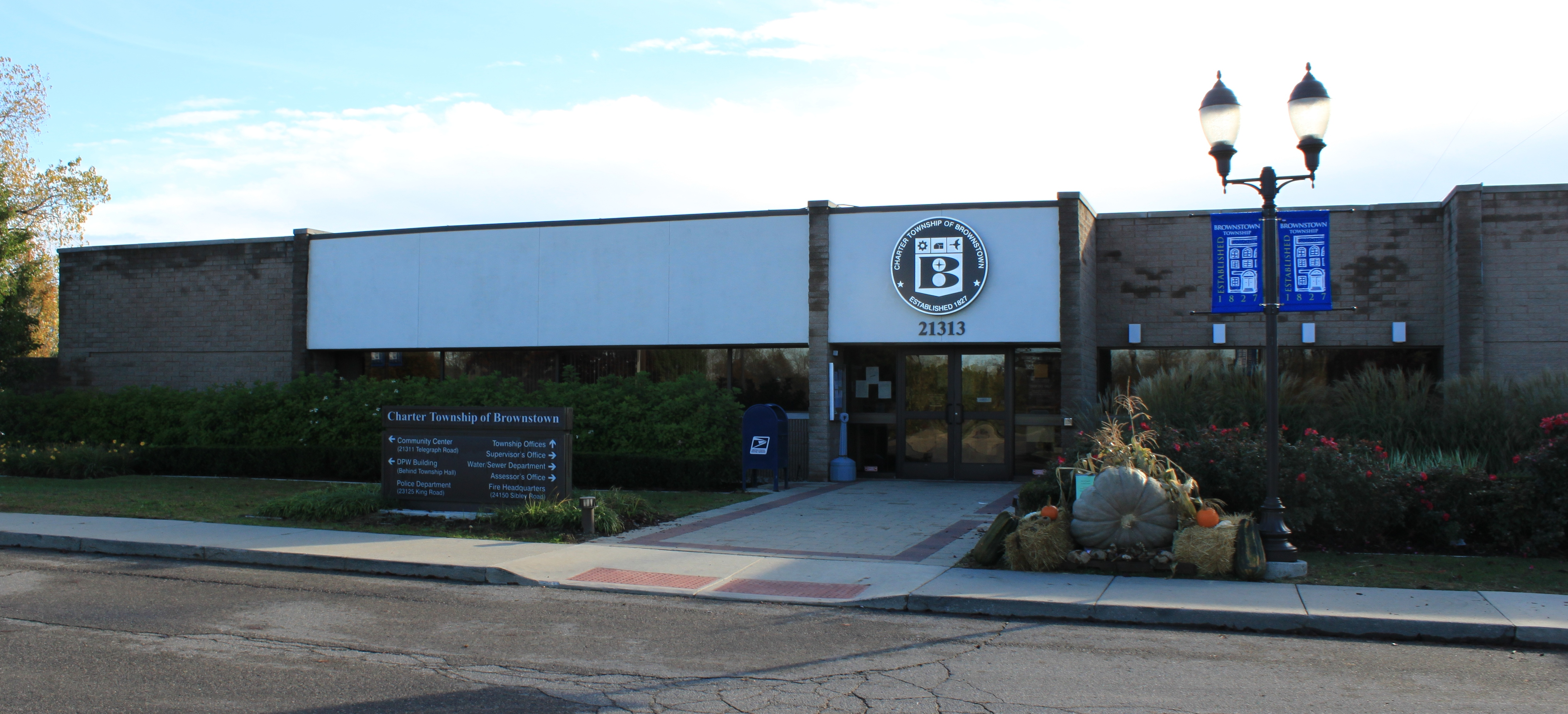
- Brownstown Charter Township Offices

- Flag Seal
- Motto: "Where The Future Looks Brighter"
- Location within Wayne County

- Location within the State of Michigan Location within the United States
- Coordinates: 42°07′34″N 83°15′26″W
- Country: United States
- State: Michigan
- County: Wayne
- Established: 1827

Government
  - Supervisor: Sherry Berecz
  - Clerk: Maureen Brinker

Area
  - Charter township: 30.64 sq mi (79.36 km^{2})
  - Land: 22.19 sq mi (57.47 km^{2})
  - Water: 8.45 sq mi (21.89 km^{2})
- Elevation: 584 ft (178 m)

Population (2020)
  - Charter township: 33,194
  - Density: 1,496/sq mi (577.6/km^{2})
  - Metro: 3,776,890 (Metro Detroit)
- Time zone: UTC-5 (EST)
  - Summer (DST): UTC-4 (EDT)
- ZIP code(s): 48134 (Flat Rock); 48164 (New Boston); 48173 (Rockwood); 48174 (Romulus); 48183 (Trenton); 48193 (Riverview)
- Area code: 734
- FIPS code: 26-11220
- GNIS feature ID: 1625993
- Website: Official website

Brownstown Charter Township is a charter township in Wayne County in the U.S. state of Michigan. Its population was 33,194 at the 2020 census. Brownstown was established in 1827, a decade prior to Michigan's admission to the Union.

Brownstown has three separate but connected segments due to the incorporation of the cities of Flat Rock, Rockwood, and Woodhaven in the early 1960s.

== History ==
Prior to the township's organization, the area was involved in the War of 1812, and the battles of Brownstown and Maguaga took place in the area.

The region now known as Brownstown was, like surrounding areas in Michigan, once a part of the French colony of New France (Mid France). The area eventually fell into hands of the British and finally came under American rule in the 18th century. The original 43-square-mile (110 km^{2}) area of land south of Detroit was designated a township by the Michigan Territorial Council on April 5, 1827, when Moses Roberts was elected its first supervisor. This made Brownstown one of Wayne County's nine original townships.

Research from local historians has found that the township was named for Adam Brown, who was kidnapped by the Wyandot Indians. Brown was raised by the Wyandots, married a native woman, and grew to become a tribal leader. As time passed, settlements spread out from the lakeshore to begin changing the swampy, sandhill countryside into productive farmland. Established in 1893, Kurtzhals Farm is one of the largest remaining farms in the township.

== Geography ==
According to the United States Census Bureau, the township has a total area of 30.64 square miles (79.36 km^{2}), of which 8.45 square miles (21.89 km^{2}) (27.58%) are covered by water.

The township is divided into three different segments. The Huron River forms the southernmost boundary of the township with Berlin Charter Township in Monroe County. The southernmost point of the Detroit River is within the township, which leads to Lake Erie. Brownstown borders the cities of Flat Rock, Gibraltar, Riverview, Rockwood, Southgate, and Taylor, as well as touching corners with the cities of Romulus and Trenton. Huron Charter Township borders to the west. Brownstown shares a water boundary with Grosse Ile Township and across the international border with the city of Amherstburg in Ontario.

== Demographics ==
=== Racial and Ethnic composition ===
Brownstown Charter Township, Michigan – Racial and ethnic composition Note: the US Census treats Hispanic/Latino as an ethnic category. This table excludes Latinos from the racial categories and assigns them to a separate category. Hispanics/Latinos may be of any race.
| Race / Ethnicity (NH = Non-Hispanic) | Pop 2000 | Pop 2010 | Pop 2020 | % 2000 | % 2010 | % 2020 |
|---|---|---|---|---|---|---|
| White alone (NH) | 19,915 | 24,181 | 23,597 | 86.63% | 78.95% | 71.09% |
| Black or African American alone (NH) | 867 | 2,615 | 3,639 | 3.77% | 8.54% | 10.96% |
| Native American or Alaska Native alone (NH) | 99 | 98 | 86 | 0.43% | 0.32% | 0.26% |
| Asian alone (NH) | 879 | 1,578 | 2,015 | 3.82% | 5.15% | 6.07% |
| Native Hawaiian or Pacific Islander alone (NH) | 0 | 3 | 2 | 0.00% | 0.01% | 0.01% |
| Other race alone (NH) | 40 | 19 | 106 | 0.17% | 0.06% | 0.32% |
| Mixed race or Multiracial (NH) | 365 | 540 | 1,557 | 1.59% | 1.76% | 4.69% |
| Hispanic or Latino (any race) | 824 | 1,593 | 2,192 | 3.58% | 5.20% | 6.60% |
| Total | 22,989 | 30,627 | 33,194 | 100.00% | 100.00% | 100.00% |

=== 2000 census ===
At the 2000 census, 22,989 people, 8,322 households, and 6,249 families resided in the township. The population density was 1,024.0 inhabitants per square mile (395.4/km^{2}). The 9,008 housing units had an average density of 401.3 per square mile (154.9/km^{2}). The racial makeup of the township was 89.02% White, 3.82% African American, 0.53% Native American, 3.83% Asian, 0.86% from other races, and 1.95% from two or more races. Hispanics or Latinos of any race were 3.58%.

Of the 8,322 households, 40.3% had children under 18 living with them, 58.6% were married couples living together, 12.6% had a female householder with no husband present, and 24.9% were not families. About 19.8% of households were one person, and 4.3% were one person 65 or older. The average household size was 2.76, and the average family size was 3.18.

In the township, the age distribution was 28.7% under 18, 9.4% from 18 to 24, 32.7% from 25 to 44, 23.4% from 45 to 64, and 5.8% 65 were or older. The median age was 33 years. For every 100 females, there were 97.9 males. For every 100 females 18 and over, there were 94.7 males.

The median income for a household was $55,239 and for a family was $65,544. Males had a median income of $50,246 versus $29,614 for females. The per capita income for the township was $22,523. About 5.7% of families and 6.9% of the population were below the poverty line, including 8.3% of those under 18 and 7.4% of those 65 or over.

The population of Brownstown Township was 30,627. The racial and ethnic makeup of the population was 79.0% non-Hispanic white, 8.6% Black or African-American, 0.4% Native American, 5.2% Asian, 0.1% non-Hispanics of some other race, 2.1% reporting two or more races and 5.2% Hispanic or Latino.

== Transportation ==
=== Highways ===
- I-75
- US 24 (Telegraph Road)
- US 25, U.S. highway that was decommissioned in 1973. It ran along the current Dix–Toledo Road, which runs through the northern portion of the township.
- M-85 (Fort Street)

=== Other roadways ===
- Hull's Trace North Huron River Corduroy Segment, built in 1812, is a historic roadway that was the first military road and first federal road in the United States.
- Jefferson Avenue runs along the southeastern portion of the township.

=== Bridges ===
- Jefferson Avenue–Huron River and Harbin Drive–Silver Creek Canal Bridges is a bridge listed on the National Register of Historic Places that carries Jefferson Avenue over the Huron River, as well as the connected Harbin Drive bridge over the Silver Creek.

== Economy ==
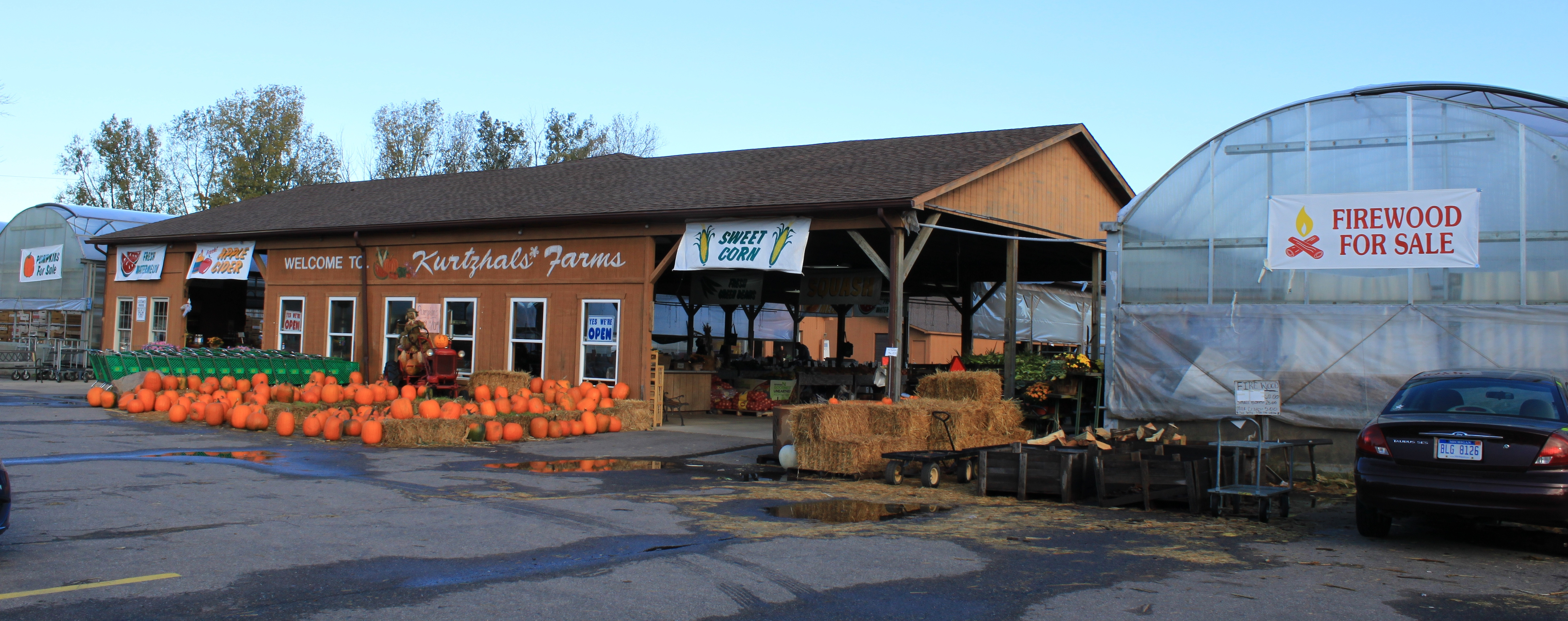
Kurtzhals Farms

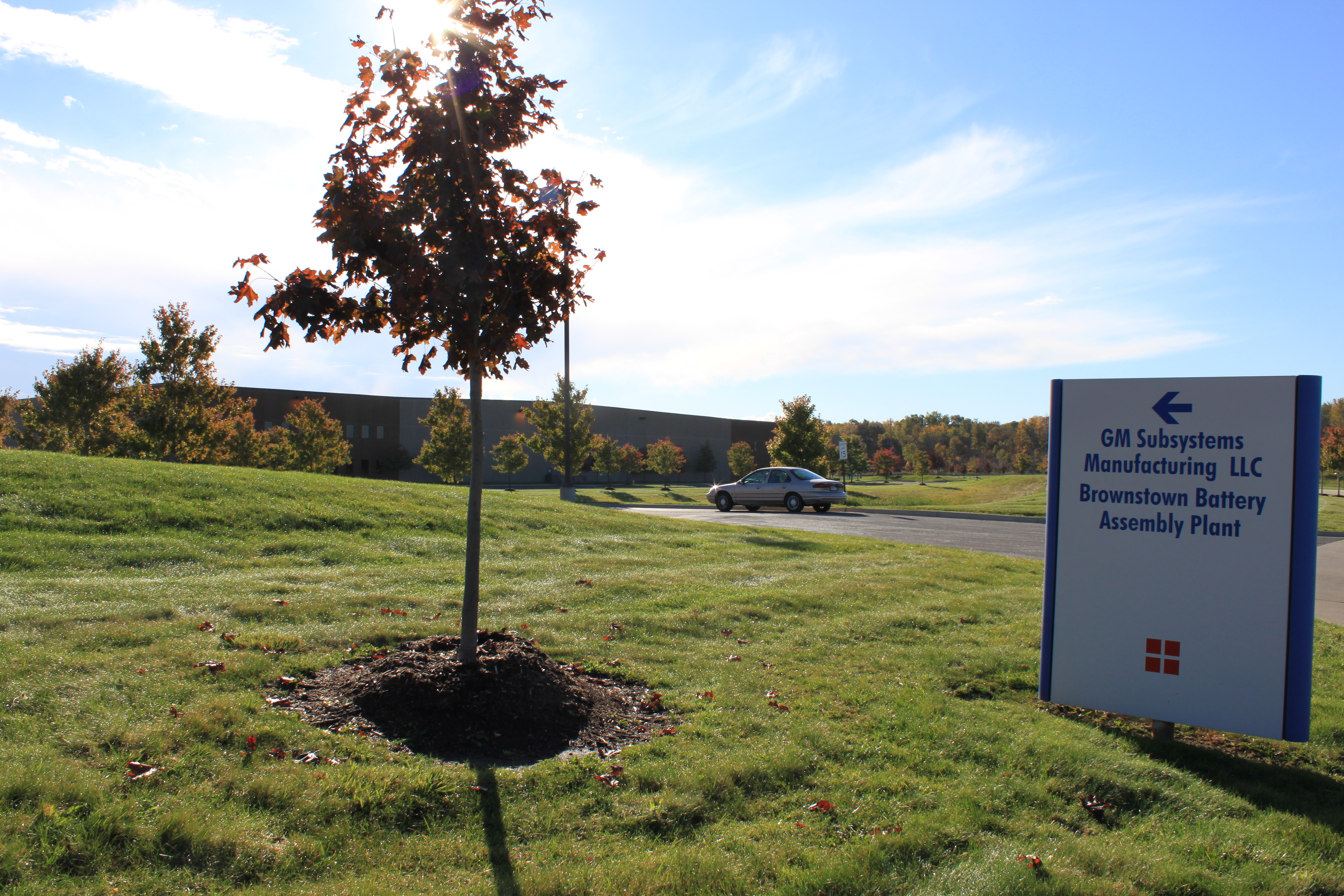
Brownstown battery assembly plant

The township is also home to the Chevrolet Volt Battery Pack Assembly Plant. GM converted an empty warehouse on Sibley and King Roads between I-75 and Allen Road into a temporary plant.

Amazon opened a distribution center in Brownstown in 2015.

== Education ==
Most of the township is served by the Woodhaven-Brownstown School District. The district includes eight separate schools and students from both the City of Woodhaven and Brownstown Township may attend the district. Woodhaven High School is the high school for the district.

A portion of the township is within the Gibraltar School District.

Students in the small neighborhood south of Pennsylvania Road and west of Telegraph within Brownstown attend Taylor School District schools. These students are assigned to Eureka Heights Elementary School, West Middle School, and Taylor High School, all in Taylor.

Residents in the northern section were once served by the Bacon Memorial Library in Wyandotte, but now all residents are served by the Trenton Veterans Memorial Library in Trenton.

== Notable people ==
- Sherry Berecz, politician.
