= St Andrew's Uniting Church, Brisbane =

Heritage-listed building in Brisbane, Queensland

St Andrew's Uniting Church
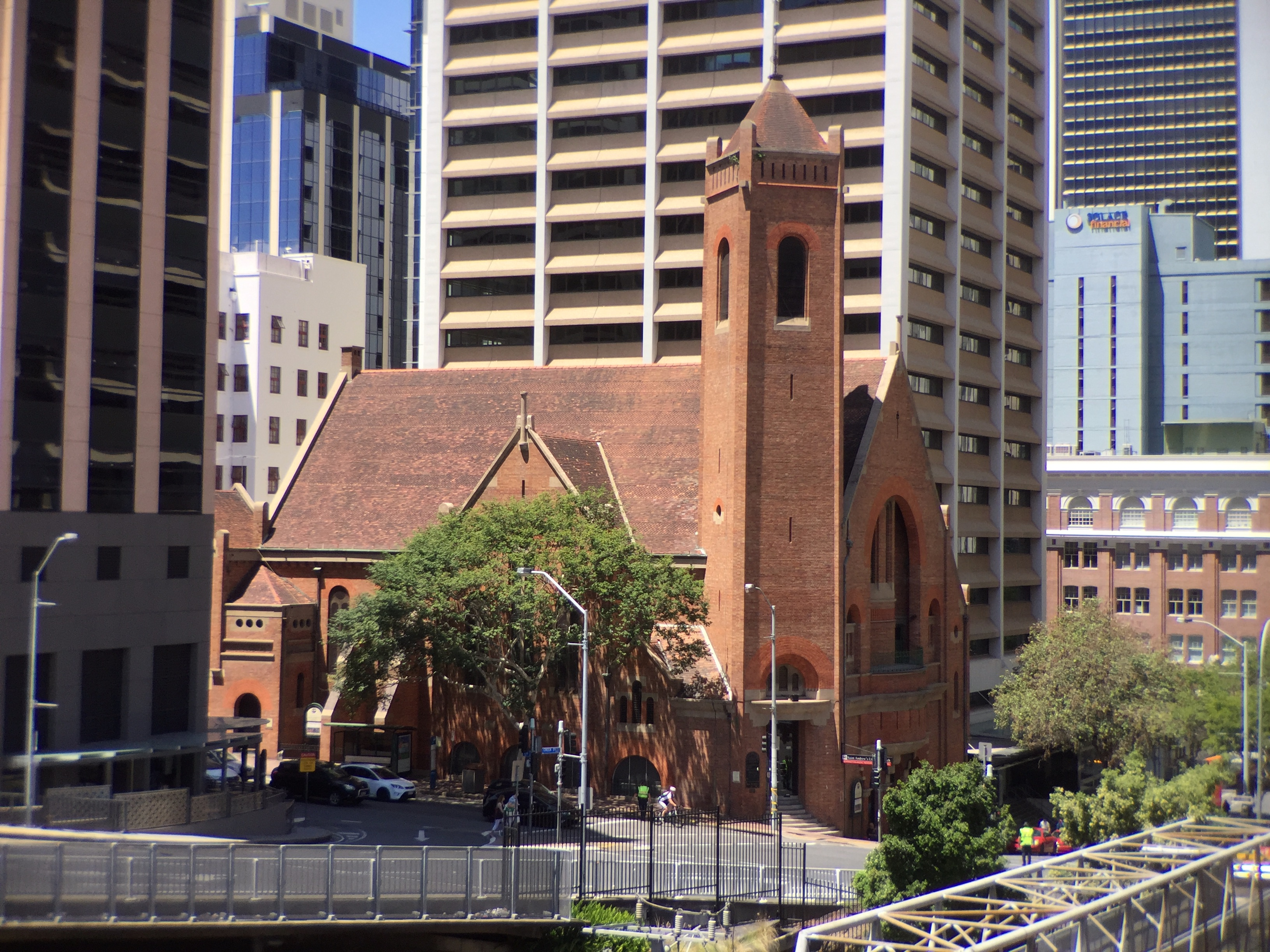
- St Andrew's Uniting Church, 2015
- St Andrew's Uniting Church
- 27°27′56″S 153°01′39″E
- Address: 131 Creek Street, Brisbane City, City of Brisbane, Queensland
- Country: Australia
- Denomination: Uniting (since 1977)
- Previous denomination: Presbyterian (1905–1977)
- Website: saintandrews.org.au

History
- Former name: St Andrew's Presbyterian Church
- Status: Church
- Dedication: Andrew the Apostle
- Dedicated: 27 August 1905

Architecture
- Functional status: Active
- Architect: George David Payne
- Architectural type: Church
- Style: Romanesque Revival
- Years built: 1902–1905

Specifications
- Materials: Brick; concrete

Administration
- Parish: St Andrew's

Queensland Heritage Register
- Official name: St Andrew's Uniting Church; St Andrew's Presbyterian Church
- Type: State heritage (built)
- Designated: 21 October 1992
- Reference no.: 600086
- Significant period: 1905 (fabric); 1977 (historical)
- Significant components: Hall, pipe organ, furniture/fittings, stained glass window/s, tower
- Builders: Alexander Lind & Son

St Andrew's Uniting Church is a heritage-listed Uniting church at 131 Creek Street (corner with Ann Street), Brisbane CBD, City of Brisbane, Queensland, Australia. It was designed by George David Payne and built in 1905 by Alexander Lind & Son. Initially St Andrew's Presbyterian Church, it became part of the Uniting Church following the merger of the Presbyterian, Methodist and Congregational Churches in 1977. It was added to the Queensland Heritage Register on 21 October 1992.

== History ==
St Andrew's Church was constructed in 1905 for the local parish of the Presbyterian Church previously located on land now used as part of Brisbane Central Railway Station. The building was designed by innovative architect, George D. Payne.

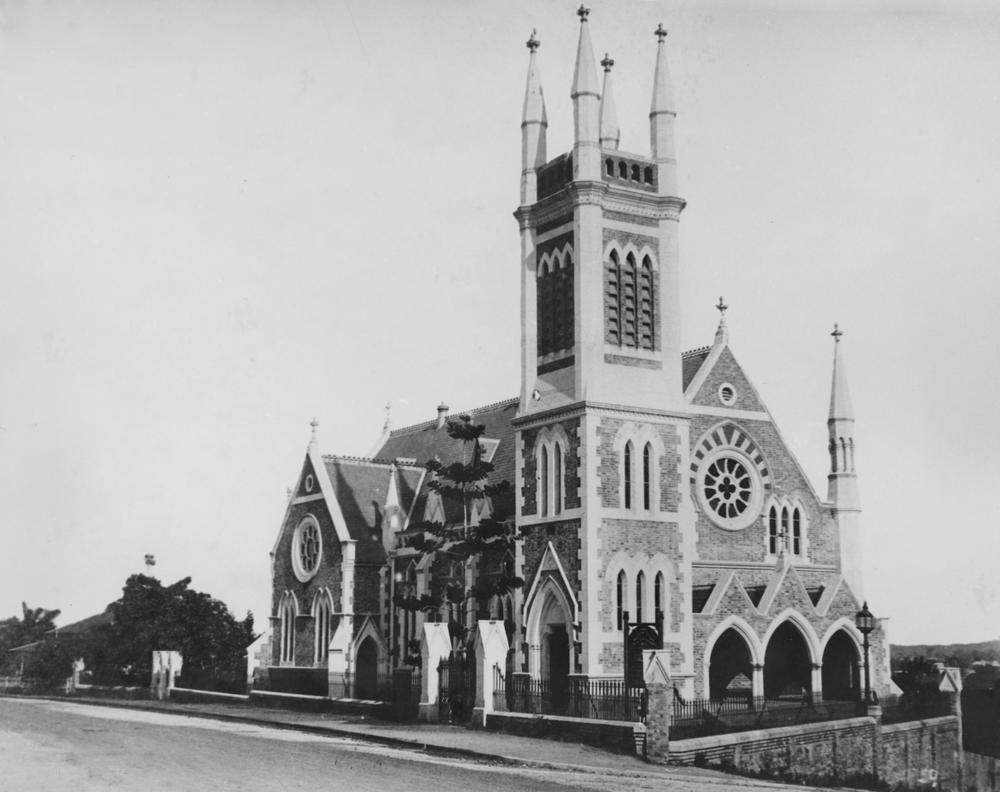
Second Presbyterian Church at Wickham Terrace, 1890

=== First St Andrew's Church ===
The Presbyterian congregation who eventually built St Andrew's, constructed their first church at the corner of Wickham Terrace and Creek Street in 1863. This building, designed by Benjamin Backhouse, was known as the Union Presbyterian Church in commemoration of the amalgamation of the Church of Scotland, Free Church and United Presbyterian Church to form the Presbyterian Church of Queensland. The first minister appointed by the congregation was James Love, an Irishman who started preaching in the School of Arts building in Ann Street upon his arrival in Queensland. The congregation at the Union Presbyterian Church remained in their small sandstone church until 1887 when a new larger church designed by Willoughby Powell was constructed. This building was an ornate early English Gothic structure of brick, prominent in early photographs of Brisbane, which featured attached buttressing terminating in pinnacles above an open parapet and a large tower in the north-west corner.

Unfortunately, only ten years after the construction of their new church the congregation learnt of plans to quadruple the lines at Brisbane Central Railway Station, meaning the land on which the church was built was to be wholly or partially resumed. By 1900 firm plans were laid for the expansion of Central Station and negotiations began between the church and the Railway Commissioner over compensation. A deal was made for the payment of £20,000, paid to the Supreme Court and payable to the church on proof that the money was to be used for the acquiring of land and the construction of a substitute church. The former church was available rent free until October 1903 when plans for the railway station were to be realised.

=== Second St Andrew's Church ===
A new site for the construction of their third church was found by the elders of the Presbyterian congregation on the corner of Ann and Creek streets. The land was then occupied by a manufacturing plant and the land belonged to William Perry, who had leased the property from the original holder of the Deed off Grant, Henry Murray in 1875. In November 1884 Perry purchased the property and a quick succession of owners follows until the land was bought by Charles Elliott of Melbourne in December 1888. In July 1894 the Australian Mutual Provident Society became the owners of the property and it was they who appointed elders from the Presbyterian congregation as trustees of the site in 1901. After the Presbyterian Church Property Act 1909 the property was vested in the Presbyterian Church of Queensland in February 1911.

Thus, after 1901 the former Wickham Terrace Presbyterian congregation became the owners of the land on the corner of Ann and Creek Streets and plans for the construction of a new building were made. The minutes of a meeting held on 8 July 1902 record the following resolutions; that a church be constructed on the site at a cost of between £8000 and £10,000 and that a competition be held for a design for the church open to Brisbane architects. The sum of £100 was to be expended in prize money, awarding the winner and three commended works. The competition stipulated that seating be provided for 500 people with provision for 200 additional attendants. Other facilities were to include an organ, choir stalls, a hall underneath the church, a minister's vestry, ladies parlour, choir room, toilets and a session room. The building was to be of brick or stone with pricing provided for both schemes. Further requirements were for three entrances from Ann Street, one to the administrative areas and two to the body of the church and an entrance from Creek Street also giving access to the hall beneath the church. During October 1902 the results of the competition, which was judged by Brisbane architect, Claude William Chambers, were published in local newspapers and weekly journals and these nominated George D Payne of the Public Works Department as the winner of the competition with other local architect Walter Carey Voller coming second and architectural partnership, Addison and Corrie, being awarded third prize. The design was simple and severe and did not find favour with many, who had expected a Gothic Revival-style church. However, it is regarded as one of the Southern Hemisphere's finest examples of the Neo-Romanesque style.

George D. Payne, the winning architect, was employed at the time within the Queensland Public Works Department, after moving to Brisbane in 1898 from New South Wales where he was in private practice after a period of employment with architectural partnership, Lowerish and Moorhouse. During his professional life in Sydney he entered many competitions and, despite the poor economic conditions, maintained a reasonably successful practice. Payne was a foundation member and inaugural president of the Sydney Architectural Association. In March 1898 Payne took a position as a temporary draftsman in the Public Works Department where he was involved in the design and construction of several outstanding public buildings in Queensland including the Rockhampton Customs House, the Townsville Customs House, detail work on first floor verandahs of the Warwick Post Office, and the East Brisbane State School. In February 1901 Payne was appointed assistant to Thomas Pye, the District Architect of the Southern Division, but soon after, under notice of retrenchment, entered the competition for the design of St Andrew's Church. After he was announced winner in late 1902 he remained at the works department until December 1902 when he resigned to undertake construction supervision of his winning design. After construction of the church, Payne continued in private practice but failed to "attract work of a scale commensurate with his talent." It is therefore for the work at St Andrew's on which his state and, indeed, national reputation as an innovative and highly skilled architect is based.

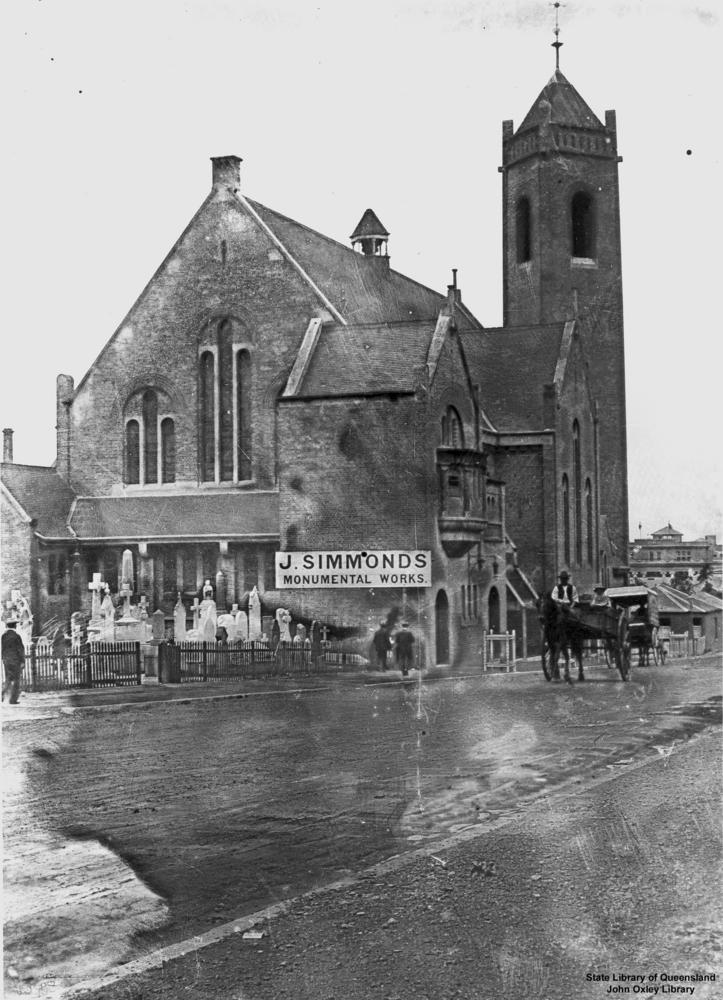
St Andrew's Presbyterian Church viewed from Ann Street, c. 1915.

Construction on the church began in late 1902, after the tender of Messrs Alexander Lind and Son, assisted by foreman Alexander Anderson, was accepted, and continued until 27 August 1905 when it was opened for public worship, the first service being conducted by Rev. W. Sweyn Macqueen. Payne remained involved in the project throughout construction and it is perhaps for this reason that the finished building is characterised throughout by well integrated and sophisticated detailing. A lengthy report in a Presbyterian newspaper, The Messenger, commemorating the opening of the church comments on public criticism of the building, likening the criticism to that experienced by the opening of Westminster Cathedral (the Roman Catholic Cathedral located in central London, built 1895–1903). This was designed by John Francis Bentley, and constructed in polychrome banded brickwork in the manner of Byzantine or Early Christian churches, quite different from the usual Gothic tone of churches of the time in that part of Europe. The article says, "there is no denying that it (St Andrew's) is unique as far as the Commonwealth is concerned. It has no prototype that we know", and continued on to describe the style of architecture as "a phase of early Christian or early Romanesque, that had its best expression in simplicity and severity of detail which relies for effect on the impressive dignity of the grouping of masses, forms, proportion, and which excludes all extravagant and unnecessary ornament." Those design features of St Andrew's which are of the Romanesque style, include the previously discussed massing of bold forms; the use of simple geometric shapes; semicircular arched openings; the half-domed interior to the chancel area; vaulting in the narthex and in the hall beneath the church; the general heaviness of many of these features rendered in face brick and the sparse use of Celtic and Norman ornamentation.

Design of churches during the Victorian period in Britain and her empire was dominated by a revival of the forms and inspiration of the Gothic movement. The Gothic church of the thirteenth and fourteenth century came to be a symbol of the power and glory of the church in a time when such characteristics were seriously threatened. Toward the end of the nineteenth century a new direction was taken, emphasising the influence of an earlier period of church building; early Christian ecclesiastical architecture, most obviously that of Byzantine and Romanesque periods. It is after manner that Payne conceived his design for St Andrew's.

Of the many fine features in the completed church the most remarkable are the semi-domed chancel, the organ and several panels of stained glass. The ceiling of the chancel was formed from a semi-dome of concrete with a 28-foot (8.5 m) span and, supposedly, marking the introduction of the groined vault into Queensland. The organ is a spectacular example of the work of Austral Organ Works, in a silky oak case designed by George Payne and built by Messrs JD Campbell and Son for £1440. The kinetic electric blower installed in the organ was apparently the first installed in Australia and relies on a rotary action, combining a series of duct fans to eliminate noise from operation. The prominence and importance attached to the organ reflects the significance of music in the Presbyterian church, particularly at the time of the construction of this building. Three stained glass windows in the narthex of the church are of particular note as the work of prominent Sydney stained glazier, FW Ashwin and Co. The central panels represent the Burning Bush and flanking it are two figural windows, one of John Knox and the other of John Calvin, both of whom were associated with the early development of Presbyterianism. Ashwin and Co. also provided other, unspecified, leadlighting for the building and the total sum of their contract was £66.

The newly constructed church was much admired in Brisbane, and remains one of the most interesting ecclesiastical buildings in the state.

There was a universal feeling expressed by those present who had not previously seen the interior that they had not dreamed that it would be so magnificent, the austerity of the exterior scarcely preparing them for the fine effect of the chancel, with its shining brass and gleaming silver and burnished gold, the splendid sweep of the interior arches, the spacious auditorium unbroken by a single pillar, and the lofty roof, where sunbeams glinted and shadows came and went.

Very few changes have been made to St Andrew's Church since its construction was completed in 1905. As the fiftieth anniversary of the congregation approached in the 1914, small changes were made to improve the acoustics, ventilation and natural lighting of the building. These alterations included laying a ruberoid flooring, providing new window openings, and installing electric fans at the northern end of the auditorium. A large stained glass window was installed at the northern end of the auditorium, above the narthex, in 1921 in celebration of another anniversary.

Following the formation in 1977 of the Uniting Church in Australia, from the Presbyterian, Methodist and Congregational religions, St Andrew's Church is now a Uniting Church. More recent changes to the building include the conversion of the session house and ladies' parlour into contemporary office space. The Ann Street City Uniting Church, built in 1959 as the City Congregational Church was closed in 1981 and amalgamated to form St Andrew's Uniting Church parish.

Although the former Wickham Terrace church was sold for railway redevelopment to commence in 1903, the redevelopment work did not occur for many years. The church was used by the railways for storage until 1929, then rented as a gymnasium until 1942 and then finally occupied by the City Congregational Church until 1960, when the redevelopment for the railway station finally commenced.

== Description ==
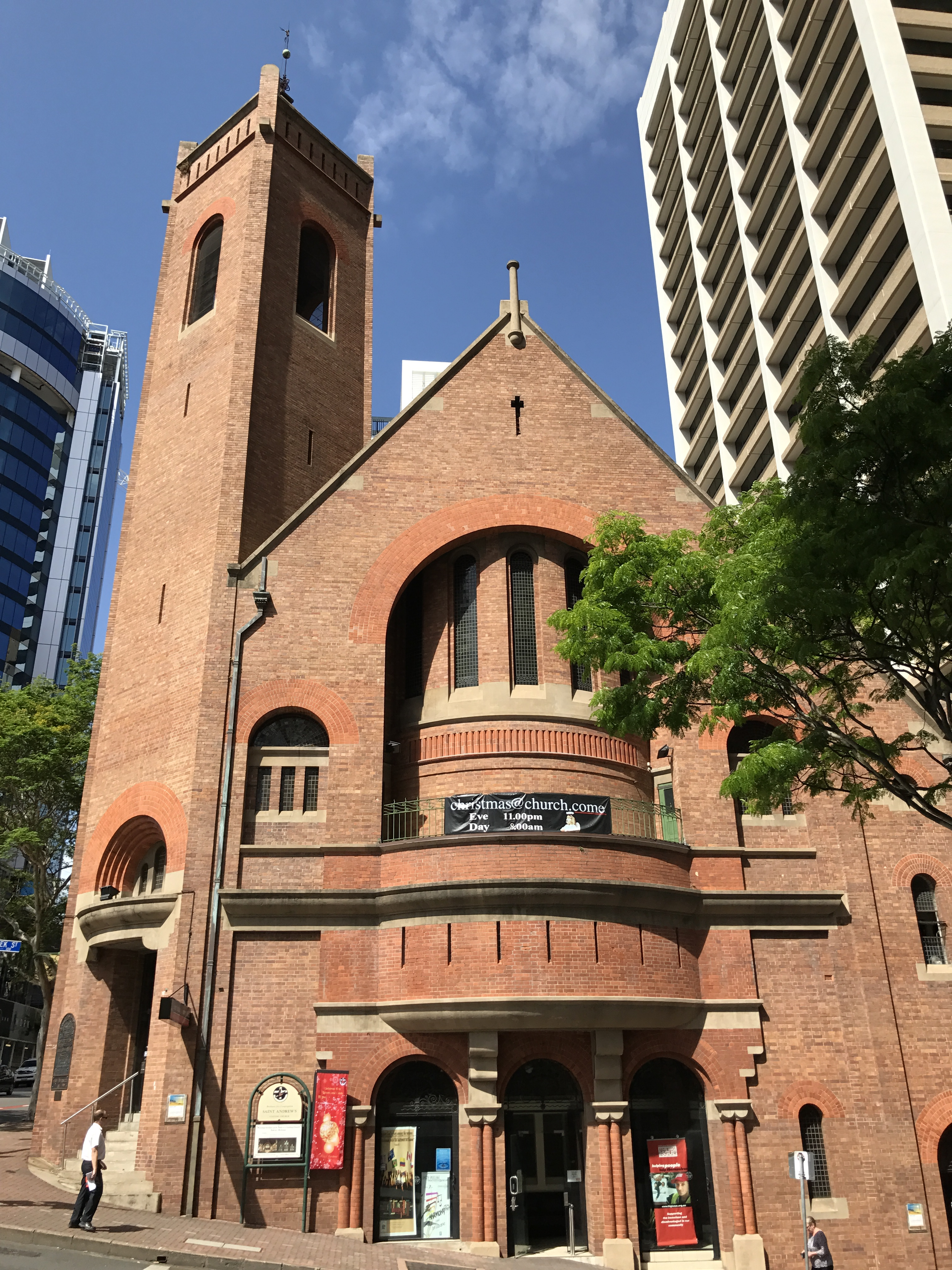
Creek Street entrance, 2016

St Andrew's Church is a substantial brick and concrete building, occupying a prominent Brisbane CBD site on the corner of Creek and Ann Streets. The building is constructed in alignment with the footpath and covering most of the property allotment.

The church is a well-composed building, relying more for its character relying on the intrinsic characteristics of natural materials and the bold massing of simple forms than on ornamentation and decoration, which are often characteristic of ecclesiastical architecture. The architect, Payne, was much influenced by the late Victorian interest in Romanesque architectural styles, and this influence is most obvious at St Andrew's in the repeated use of the semicircular arched opening, vaulted and domed ceilings, sparse use of Celtic and Norman ornamentation and sophisticated face brickwork.

The building is asymmetrically arranged, with principal facades to both Creek and Ann Streets. It is a loadbearing brick structure with concrete foundation and basement substructure. Concrete detailing is found throughout the building, and includes door and window surrounds, tracery, stairs, roof detailing, internal vaulting and dome and internal corbelling. The building's ecclesiastical function is apparent in the traditional cruciform floor plan, with transepts extending from the north-south running nave, to the east and west, the western transept facing Ann Street. A rectangular wing, housing the early Session House, abuts the northern end of the building, also with principal entrance to Ann Street. The unglazed terracotta tiled roof of the church is gabled over the nave and transepts, with the Session House separately gabled with end to Ann Street. Complementing the forms of the steeply pitched gabled roofs, is a square planned tower at the principal corner of the site, and turned through 45°, thus truncating the corner of the building and providing a suitable position for a corner entrance. The tower houses the principal semicircular arched doorway at ground level, accessed via several concrete steps, above which are several elongated rectangular and small circular openings with large semicircular arched openings near the cornice line. A simple concrete parapet, with ribbed detail and four simple corner pinnacles, surmounts the tower and partially conceals the pyramidal roof that has a concrete apex surmounted by a fine wrought iron finial.

The asymmetrically composed western facade of the building, addressing Ann Street, comprises the gabled ends of the western transept and, at the northern end, an entrance porch abutting the smaller gabled end of the Session House. Between the entrance porch and transept is a recessed wall, forming part of the wall of the nave of the church, which is externally buttressed with two tapered brick projections, extending to the sub floor level. The buttresses extend out from the building to be aligned with the transept face and have semicircular arched openings at their bases, forming a cloister-like external court adjacent to the hall in the basement of the church. The gabled transept end has three semicircular arched window openings, elongated and extending over much of the length of the gabled end. The entrance porch is square planned projection, with a simple roof and housing a semicircular arched doorway providing access to an internal porch leading to the narthex of the church. Above the doorway are several concrete bands one of which is pebble dashed, above these are three small circular windows in a horizontal line with concrete surrounds. The gabled end of the session house is visually dominated by a projecting bay window or oriel, at first floor level. Below this at ground floor level is a semicircular arched doorway providing entrance to the session house and a tripartite window arrangement of small equally sized rectangular openings, glazed with stained and coloured glass.

The Creek Street facade of the building comprises the gabled southern end of the church that is symmetrically composed. Dominant on the face of the gable is a bowed projection, forming the external wall of the corridor at the rear of the chancel and following its rounded shape. The projecting rounded shape of this feature is reflected in the base and support of the large semicircular arched opening, through which it projects. On the face of the projection are a number of elongated semicircular arched windows, filled with stained and coloured glass panels, and beneath these are a number of decorative brick bands. The bowed base of the arched opening has a series of window openings, like slits, which provide natural lighting to the corridor within. The base of the archway is supported on a concrete corbel. Below this projection, at street level, are three semicircular arched door openings, fitted with collapsible steel gates, with ornamental ironwork in the head of the archway. Flanking these openings are two arched openings fitted with four windows glazed with square multi-paned glass panels.

The principal entrance to the building is via a large semicircular arched doorway that is at the base of the tower, turned to run diagonally to the building. A double timber door from this entrance provides access to a small circular entrance vestibule from where two curved concrete stairs lead to the choir and vestry to the east and to the church auditorium on the western side. The vestibule, which has a concrete ceiling and floor, features lettering around the concrete cornice, "ENTER INTO HIS GATES WITH THANKSGIVING". This arrangement was not intended as the usual entrance for the congregation to the church, which was planned through two doorways from Ann Street providing access to an encaustic tiled porch with a concrete stair leading to the narthex, or outer chamber of the church auditorium. The narthex houses many fine architectural details including three stained glass panels in semicircular arched openings, supplied by FW Ashwin & Co. Three timber doors in the southern wall of the narthex provide entry to the auditorium.

The church interior is in the traditional ecclesiastical cruciform plan, with shallow transepts formed at the southern end and expressed externally by the gabled projections to Ann Street and on the opposite side of the building. The body of the church is entirely open with a raked timber boarded ceiling, clad with ruberoid matting, and arched roof trusses which, like most of the joinery in the building, have been stained to a dark timber colour. The transepts, lower in height than the body of the church have large window openings, some of which have been fitted with stained glass panels. At the rear of the church, on the northern wall are three large tripartite window opening arrangements fitted with stained glass panels, featuring stories from the life of Christ.

Dominating the interior is a large and fine organ, found, in Presbyterian manner, raised in the chancel of the church and almost filling the entire cavity. A round headed chancel archway separates the apsidal chancel from the body of the church and provides the springing point for a semi-domical ceiling in the chancel area. The silky oak organ case is a fine piece of joinery designed by the architect of the church and featuring carved panels and gold lettering and very well integrated with the other altar furniture, choir seating and other joinery in the building. The chancel area comprises a number of tiers, with elders' and minister's seating on the lowest level, and choir seating, protected by a wrought iron balustrade, above.

At the rear of the chancel and expressed externally in the bowing projection in the arched opening on the Creek Street gabled section of the building, is a narrow corridor providing access to each side of the choir stalls and also between the principal stairs of the building. The narrowness and low lighting afforded through slits to Creek Street, make this corridor and associated spaces seem catacomb-like.

Characteristic of the church auditorium level of St Andrew's Church is the high quality and innovative and unusual design of the internal joinery. The stair joinery, doors, windows and their framing, along with church seating, wainscotting, benches, and other fittings are very well designed pieces, original to this building and contribute to the building's outstanding design.

Beneath the church auditorium and entered from an open entrance porch off Creek Street access to which is provided through three large semicircular arched doorway openings is the church hall. The interior of the hall is dominated by a double row of large concrete piers, and is flanked on the eastern side by an open courtyard along the Ann Street retaining wall boundary that is braced with a system of buttresses aligned with the internal columns in both auditoria.

Housed in a two storeyed section abutting the northern side of the building, the Session House, is the administrative core of the church, with the original session room and ladies' parlour. Though these have been recently renovated to provide some modern office accommodation, many of the early spaces have been retained.

== Heritage listing ==
St Andrews Uniting Church was listed on the Queensland Heritage Register on 21 October 1992 having satisfied the following criteria.

The place is important in demonstrating the evolution or pattern of Queensland's history.

St Andrew's Uniting Church, formerly Presbyterian, is a large centrally located church that demonstrates the growth of Presbyterianism in Queensland, particularly in Brisbane where it was the home of one of the largest congregations for many years. The building, constructed in 1905 following expansion at Brisbane Central Railway Station, illustrates the growth of this area of the city.

The place demonstrates rare, uncommon or endangered aspects of Queensland's cultural heritage.

St Andrew's Church is a rare example of the Brisbane work of the renowned and fine architect, George D. Payne and has special associations with him. Though Payne practised in Brisbane for many years after construction of St Andrew's, none other of his buildings are of comparable prominence.

The place is important in demonstrating the principal characteristics of a particular class of cultural places.

The building is an excellent example of the turn of the century development in ecclesiastical architecture that saw the emergence of strong early Christian, Romanesque and Byzantine influences, where previously a Gothic language dominated. The building is one of the earliest ecclesiastical buildings in Brisbane that employs this Romanesque detail and form, influenced by trends in both England where Westminster Cathedral had been erected, and America where the influential architect, HH Richardson was practicing in a style now known as American Romanesque.

Other features contributing to the significance of the church are the early church seating, elder's seating and altar furniture and other early details and fittings. The building is good and characteristic example of a Presbyterian Church with an open auditorium, prominent organ and tiered chancel arrangement.

The place is important because of its aesthetic significance.

St Andrew's Church is a landmark in Brisbane, dominating the Ann and Creek Streets streetscape, employing strong architectural forms, including steeply pitched gables and a tower, on a prominent site. The building has many prominent features of aesthetic and historical importance including the stained glass windows, organ and the internal domed ceiling of the chancel.

The place is important in demonstrating a high degree of creative or technical achievement at a particular period.

St Andrew's is a well-designed building of outstanding architectural merit, it is innovative and well composed with a sophisticated and well-integrated level of original detail.

The place has a strong or special association with a particular community or cultural group for social, cultural or spiritual reasons.

The building has special associations with the Uniting and Presbyterian Church as a place of worship for about ninety years and as the home of a congregation that was established in the 1860s.

The place has a special association with the life or work of a particular person, group or organisation of importance in Queensland's history.

St Andrew's Church is a rare example of the Brisbane work of the renowned and fine architect, George D. Payne and has special associations with him. Though Payne practised in Brisbane for many years after construction of St Andrew's, none other of his buildings are of comparable prominence.
