= George David Payne =

- Born: 1853; London, England
- Died: 1916; Brisbane, Australia
- Occupation: Architect

George David Payne (1853–1916) was an Australian architect. He worked for a short time in the Public Works Department in Queensland, alongside John Smith Murdoch and Thomas Pye in a time when the Department was producing a considerable amount of high quality works.

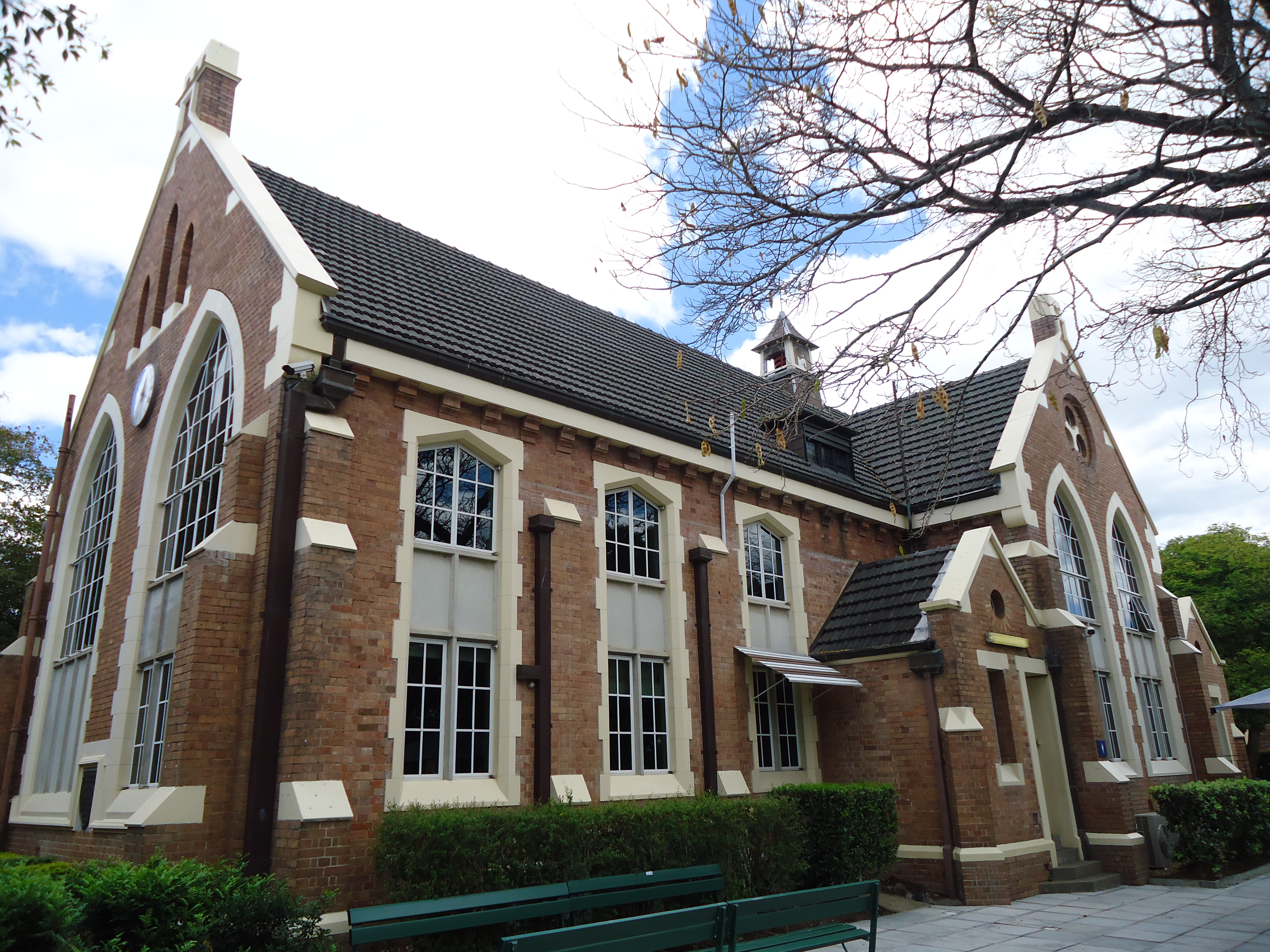
Brisbane Grammar School Science Wing addition, 1911

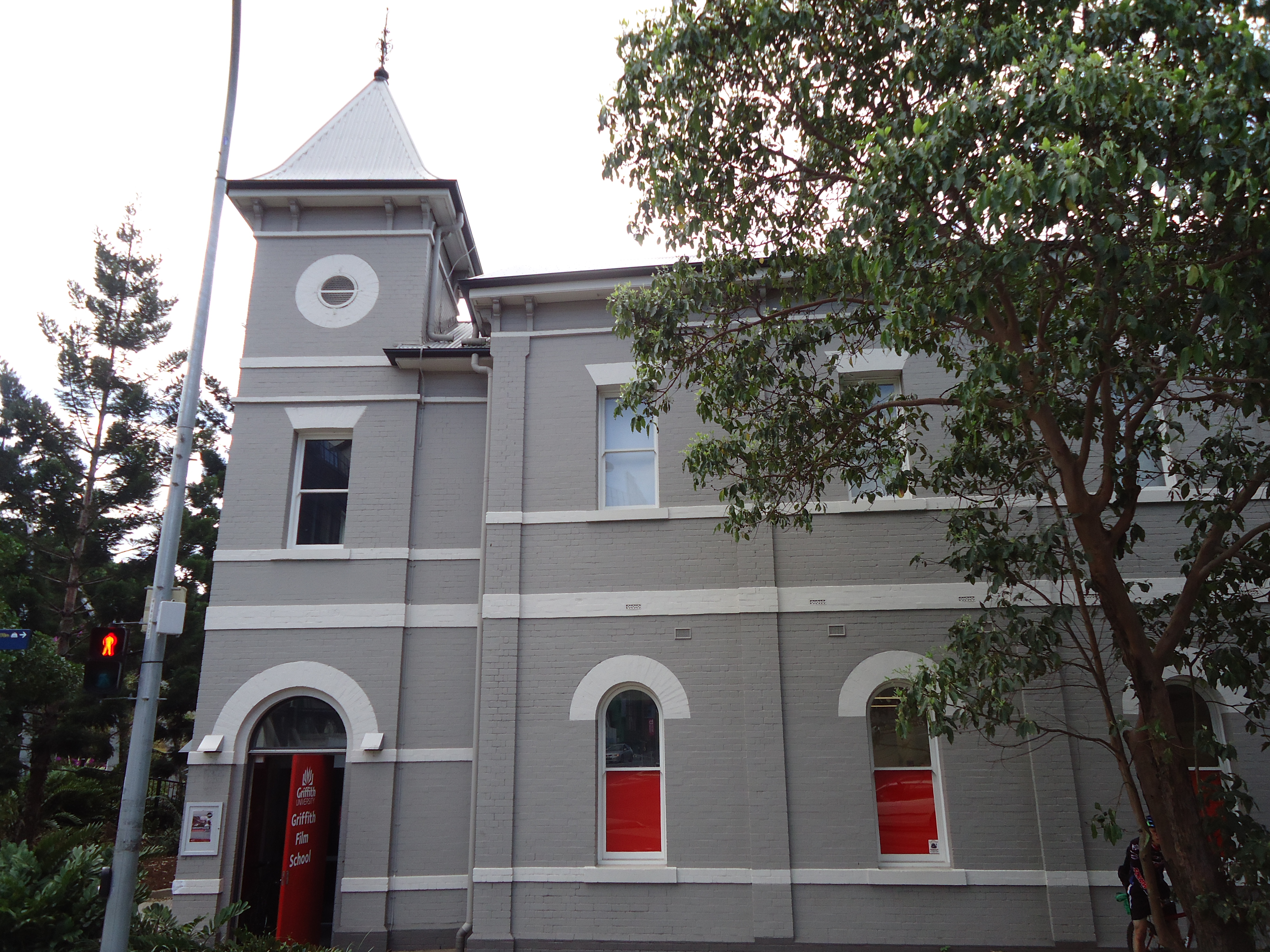
South Brisbane Library, 1911

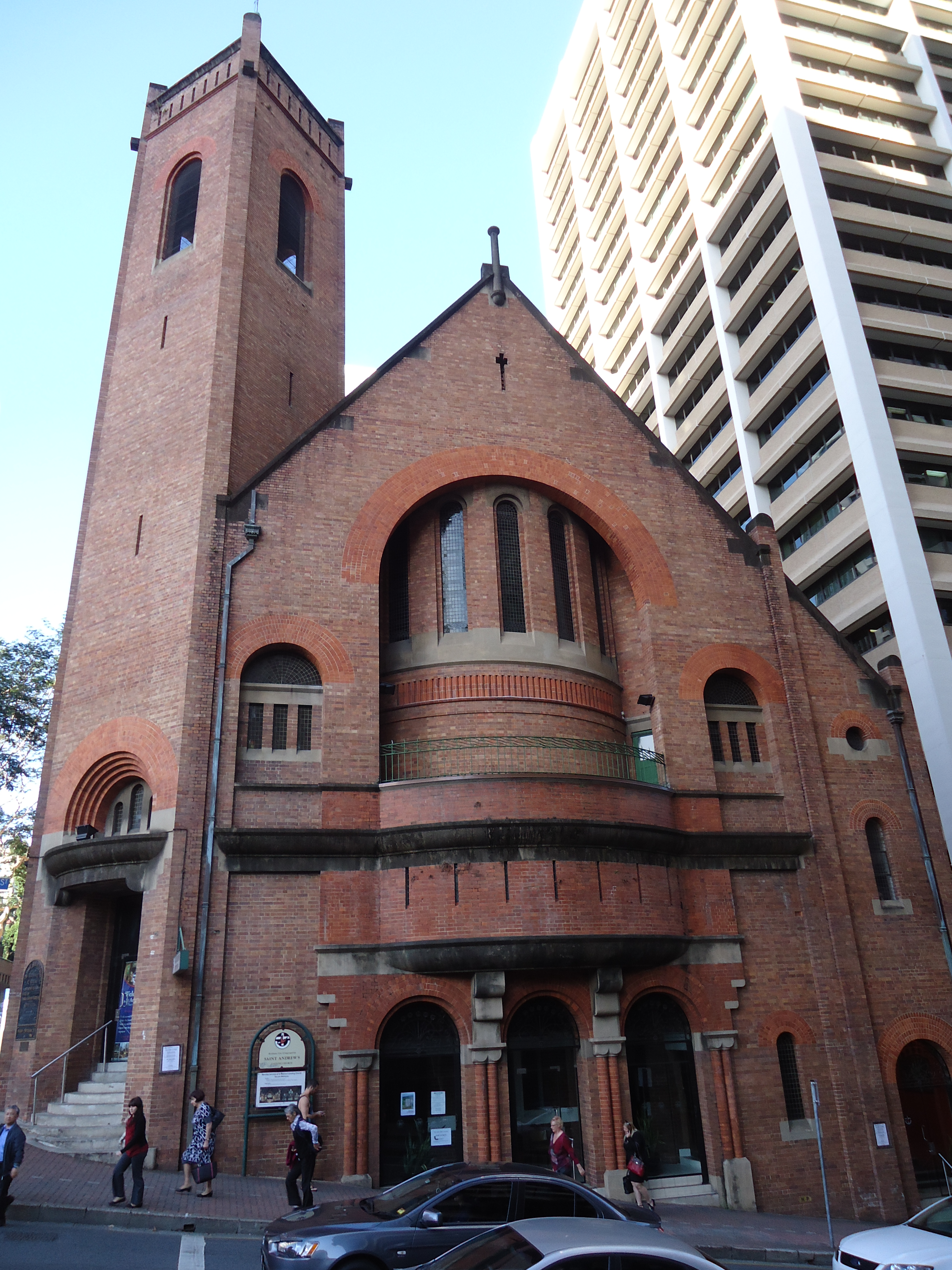
Saint Andrew's Presbyterian Church, Brisbane, 1905

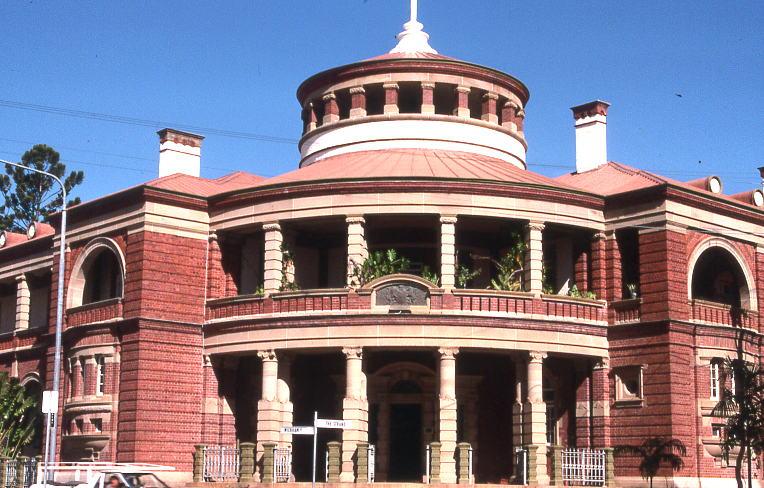
Townsville Customs House, 1900

== Personal life ==
George David Payne was born in 1853 in London, England to George David Payne, a distiller, and Eliza Grant. He received his training as an architect in London. In c.1887 Payne emigrated, settling in Sydney. He was a foundation member of the Sydney Architectural Association and its inaugural vice-president in 1891–93. His move to Brisbane around 1898 was prompted by the sustained economic depression. There he became a fellow of the Queensland Institute of Architects. In November 1897 Payne married Theodora Lucie Jarrett. His wife survived him after his death on 4 December 1916, age 63, at his residence, Holyrood, in Ryans Road, St Lucia.

== Loweish and Moorhouse ==
After settling in Australia, Payne worked for the Sydney architecture firm Loweish and Moorhouse. In 1889 he was responsible for the firm's winning design entry for the Royal Bank Competition in Brisbane. The following year he submitted an action to claim the surplus of the competition premium. The claim was much publicised and ultimately successful.

== Queensland Public Works Department ==
In March 1898 Payne joined the Queensland Department of Public Works as a draftsman where he "may have been the catalyst for the sophistication of the subsequent work of the Professional Branch." Within the department he worked alongside architects John Smith Murdoch and Thomas Pye. Payne is considered to have contributed to, or at least influenced, the design of various public buildings, including the Rockhampton Customs House, Warwick Post Office and East Brisbane State School. Among other works, the design and documentation of the Townsville Customs House is attributed to him. In 1901 Payne was appointed assistant to Thomas Pye. Payne left the Public Works Department in 1904 to oversee the construction of his winning design for St. Andrew's Presbyterian Church, Brisbane.

== Private practice ==
Payne established two architectural practices in his lifetime. The first was in Sydney, after leaving the firm Loweish and Moorhouse. Taxed by the depression, however, Payne applied for work at the Queensland Department of Public Works as a temporary Draftsman. His second private practice was in Brisbane and where he worked in the later years of his life. It is considered as not having attracted work "of a scale commensurate with his talent."

== Competitions ==
In 1889 Payne was responsible for the firm's winning design entry for the Royal Bank Competition in Brisbane. The following year, after leaving Loweish and Moorhouse, he submitted entries for to various competitions. He came third in three: The Australian Club, Melbourne, City Avenue Building, Sydney (with A. L. and G. McCredie), and an asylum at Rossiville. His entry for the Melbourne Commercial Bank the same year is also notable for its alternate elevations in Romanesque, Renaissance and Queen Anne.

In his time at the Queensland Public Works department Payne again came third, this time in the Brisbane General Post Office Competition (1900). Under notice of retrenchment, Payne entered a competition for the new Saint Andrew's Presbyterian Church in 1902. He won the competition and resigned to oversee its construction.

=== Saint Andrew's Presbyterian Church, Brisbane ===
Payne's design of Saint Andrew's is considered his greatest life work. Even when it was first built the church was recognised as one of the "finest and most impressive architectural piles in this State," although its actual beauty was debated because of a public unaccustomed to its style.

The Romanesque design was a contrast to the Gothically inspired stone church it replaced. It is renowned for its bold massing, abstracted planes, and unadorned red brickwork, and can be marked for placing importance upon the design implications of the relationship to the immediate site and the local climate.

== List of known built works ==
1900	Townsville Customs House:16 Wickham St Townsville QLD 4810
1905	Saint Andrew's Presbyterian Church: 131 Creek Street, Brisbane City QLD 4000
1911	South Brisbane Library: 472 Stanley St South Brisbane QLD 4101
1911–1916	Brisbane Grammar School (School House alterations, Science Wing and New Building): 24 Gregory Terrace Spring Hill QLD 4000
