= Townsville State Government Offices (Wickham Street) =

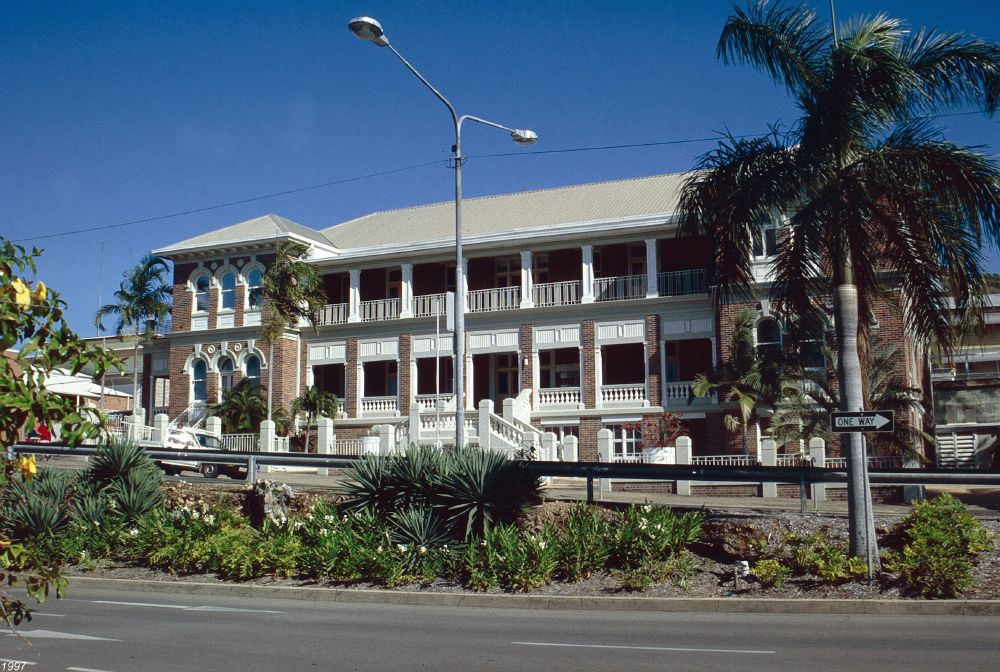
- Townsville State Government Offices, 1997

- Location within Queensland Location within Australia
- 19.256°S 146.8217°E
- Location: 12–14 Wickham Street, Townsville CBD, City of Townsville, Queensland, Australia

History
- Design period: 1919–1930s (interwar period)
- Built: 1935–1937

Site notes
- Architect: Andrew Baxter Leven
- Architectural style: Classicism

Queensland Heritage Register
- Official name: Townsville State Government Offices, Lands Department, Townsville Public Offices
- Type: state heritage (built)
- Designated: 13 January 1995
- Reference no.: 601384
- Significant period: 1930s (fabric)
- Builders: Relief work

Townsville State Government Offices is a heritage-listed office building at 12–14 Wickham Street, Townsville CBD, City of Townsville, Queensland, Australia. It was designed by Andrew Baxter Leven and built from 1935 to 1937 by relief workers. It is also known as Lands Department and Townsville Public Offices. It was added to the Queensland Heritage Register on 13 January 1995.

== History ==
The Townsville Government Offices were constructed in 1935–37 as part of a Queensland Government employment scheme. The Public Works Department was responsible for the design of the buildings, the Chief Architect of the time being Andrew Baxter Leven.

Townsville was proclaimed a town in 1866. It experienced its first phase of major growth when gold was discovered in the nearby town of Ravenswood in 1868. The construction of the Great Northern railway line and the development of the beef industry in the north, created modest growth in Townsville in the early twentieth century.

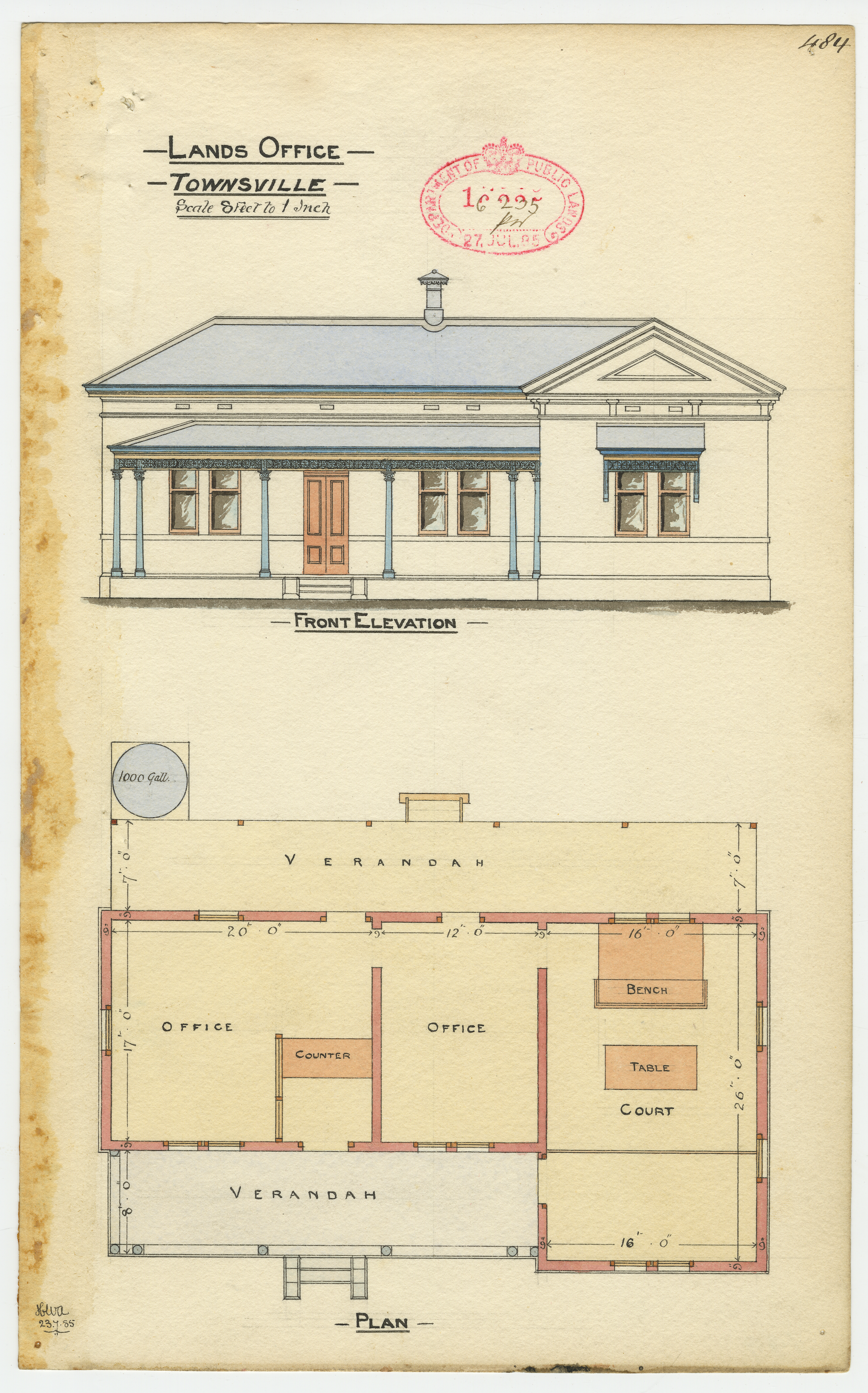
The "new" 1885 Lands Office

A "new" Lands Office was built in Townsville about 1885. However, despite repairs in the early 1930s, it was decided to move the Lands Department into a new Queensland Government building housing a number of government departments.

During the 1930s Depression, Labor Premier, William Forgan Smith established a government-initiated works scheme under the Income (Unemployment Relief) Act (1930) to create employment. This involved the employment of architects, foremen, construction workers and the use of local materials for the construction of government buildings such as court houses, government offices, schools and council halls. The Townsville State Government Offices is a fine example of work undertaken through this scheme.

The building was designed by the office of the Queensland Government Architect. The Chief Architect at this time was Andrew Baxter Leven. From 1910 to 1951 Leven was employed by the Queensland Government Works Department and was Chief Architect and Quantity Surveyor from 1933 to 1951. Other members of the office involved in the design DFW Roberts and HJ Parr.

The ground floor of the offices was to accommodate the Labour Agent and officers of the Lands Department, and the first floor was to provide offices for staff of the Queensland Department of Agriculture and Stock, Department of Public Works and Workers' Dwellings, and the Machinery Inspector, Health Inspector, Land court room and visiting Ministers' room.

The State Government Offices is typical of the tradition of high standards in design and construction of the Public Works Department, and one of a group of government buildings constructed by the department influenced by a classical revival style, including the Innisfail and Mackay Court Houses and the Cairns Government Office. The State Government Offices in Townsville were designed to harmonise with the adjacent Customs House. The area around Flinders Street (East) and The Strand including Wickham Street where the State Government Offices are situated, was the site of the first settlement in Townsville.

In 2016, the building has been divided into a number of separate tenancies with the upper floor of the building available for lease as professional offices. The Australian Red Cross are one of the tenants.

== Description ==
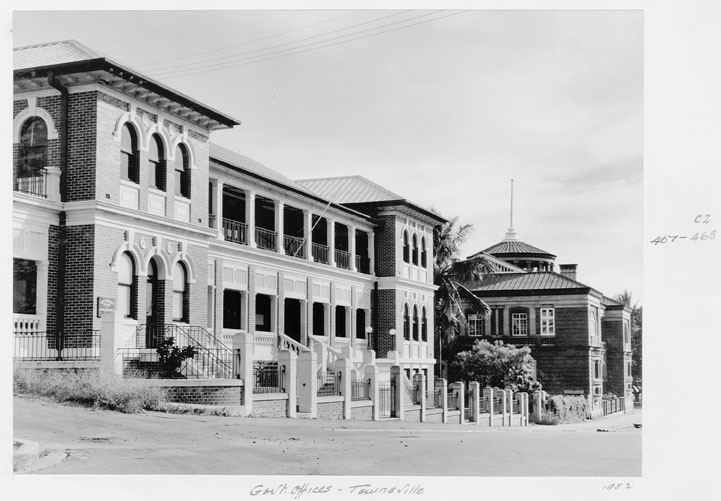
State Government Offices, 1952 (Townsville Customs House is visible to the right)

The Townsville State Government Offices is a two-storeyed brick building with basement and a hipped corrugated-iron roof. The facade of the building features two projecting end bays with round arched window and door openings. Between the bays is a two-storey colonnade with open verandahs. A centrally located bi-furcated staircase emphasises the entrance. The building is decorated with classical design features including the round arched openings and prominent keystones and eaves.

The balconies and verandahs are designed as a response to the Townsville climate and allow for cross-ventilation of all rooms and offices. The balcony floors are of concrete and the ground floor verandahs, entrance hall and main staircase are finished in terrazzo.

== Heritage listing ==
Townsville State Government Offices was listed on the Queensland Heritage Register on 13 January 1995 having satisfied the following criteria.

The place is important in demonstrating the evolution or pattern of Queensland's history.

The Townsville State Government Offices is an example of construction work undertaken under the unemployment relief scheme instigated by the State Government in the 1930s.

The place is important in demonstrating the principal characteristics of a particular class of cultural places.

Townsville State Government Offices, erected in 1935–37, is significant as a good example of the work of the Queensland Works Department, influenced by a classical revival style.

The place is important because of its aesthetic significance.

The building complements the adjacent Townsville Customs House, and is harmonious in scale and form, making a significant contribution to the townscape.
