= Townsville Customs House =

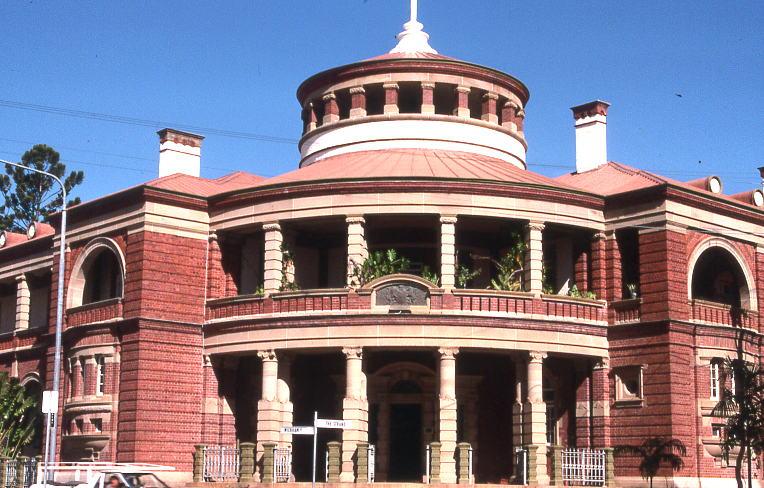
- Townsville Customs House, 2008

- Location within Queensland Location within Australia
- 19.2556°S 146.8219°E
- Location: Wickham Street, Townsville CBD, City of Townsville, Queensland, Australia

History
- Design period: 1900–1914 (early 20th century)
- Built: 1900–1902

Site notes
- Architect: George David Payne
- Architectural style: Romanesque

Queensland Heritage Register
- Official name: Townsville Customs House
- Type: state heritage (built)
- Designated: 7 February 2005
- Reference no.: 600937
- Significant period: 1900s (fabric); 1900s–1980s (historical)
- Significant components: dome, safe, residential accommodation – quarters, tower – observation/lookout, strong room
- Builders: Crawford & Cameron

Townsville Customs House is a heritage-listed former customs house at Wickham Street, Townsville CBD, City of Townsville, Queensland, Australia. It was designed by George David Payne and built from 1900 to 1902 by Crawford & Cameron. It was added to the Queensland Heritage Register on 7 February 2005.

== History ==
The former Townsville Customs House, the fourth customs building in Townsville, was constructed in 1901/02 to a design prepared in 1899/1900 by architect George Payne of the Government Architect's Office in the Queensland Department of Public Works.

Townsville had been established in the mid-1860s by pastoralist John Melton Black and his Sydney business partner, Robert Towns, as a port to service Woodstock Station. There were already ports at Bowen and Cardwell but during the wet season Woodstock and other stations to the west were often cut off from these centres by floodwaters.

In November 1864 Black's employees Andrew Ball and Mark Reid set up camp close to the mouth of Ross Creek on Cleveland Bay and in the next few months Black and Towns invested in the construction of a warehouse and wharf. A residence was constructed for Melton Black on Melton Hill overlooking the fledgling port.

At this period Robert Towns, with interests in banking, pastoral, shipping and commercial industries, was one of Australian's most influential businessmen. Having invested heavily in the early establishment of this new Queensland port facility, Black and Towns lobbied the colonial government to declare the new township a port of entry. They received support from the Queensland Collector of Customs and on 17 June 1865 Cleveland Bay was proclaimed a "Port of Entry and Clearance". At that time a small Customs service was established in the township. Staff included the Sub-Collector of Customs who, for an annual fee of |300, served as the Police Magistrate, Clerk of Petty Sessions, and Harbour and Port Master. Two staff were employed as customs and harbour workers, boatmen and constables. The construction of a bond store and customs warehouse was also authorised at that time.

On 29 July 1865 the Surveyor-General's Department decided that the new Customs House should be located next to the harbour entrance on Ross Creek. A town survey had been completed and the first land sales took place on 31 July 1865. On 6 September 1865 the Queensland Executive Council, referring for the first time to the township as "Townsville", approved a block of land bounded by the Strand and Flinders Street as an appropriate site for the Customs Reserve and new Customs House. It was in an elevated position and commanded an excellent view of the harbour.

Early in 1866 the Municipality of Townsville was declared with Black elected as Mayor. In October 1866 the Province of Townsville was declared, covering a large area centred round Townsville.

The discovery of gold at Cape River in 1867 and Ravenswood in 1869 stimulated the development of Townsville as a port and administration centre. By 1870 a new building had been constructed to house customs and court functions and a wharf built on the Customs Reserve on Ross Creek. The new building was a cramped, three-roomed wooden structure. Early in 1871 an additional two offices were added at the rear of the building. To create more space the Sub-Collector of Customs suggested that a bond store be built, which was constructed in July 1872 on the Customs Reserve close to the wharf facing Flinders Street.

In March 1874 the Sub-Collector of Customs further suggested that the Court House facilities be removed from the Customs building and in February 1875 approval was given for a new court house, which was constructed in 1876 in Sturt Street.

The Customs Service grew rapidly as road and rail networks in the Townsville hinterland expanded to meet the needs of the pastoral industry and gold fields. By the late 1870s the early timber framed government buildings in Townsville were beginning to be replaced by ore substantial structures. The new, more imposing buildings reflected the growing prosperity of the region. In 1884 the Customs Bond Store on the bank of Ross Creek was extended.

In 1889 the importance of the Customs Service was demonstrated with the opening of the new Brisbane Customs House. By September 1891 the inadequacy of the Townsville office was obvious and the decision was made to convert the former Post and Telegraph Office into a customs house. This work was completed by June 1892. At this stage the quarters of the Sub-Collector of Customs comprised a timber structure at the rear of the Supreme Court.

By 1898 the Customs Service had again outgrown its building. At the same time the Queensland government embarked on an ambitious building program to make a generous contribution to the planned Commonwealth of Australia by constructing new customs houses or upgrading existing ones prior to Federation. Included in the building program were new customs houses at Rockhampton (1898–1901), Townsville (1898–1902), Bundaberg (completed c. 1902) and Mackay (completed in 1902) and an upgrading of the 1870 Maryborough Customs House in 1900.

Townsville Customs and Estate Agent JN Parkes, commissioned to find a suitable site for a new Townsville customs house, recommended two blocks bounded by The Strand, Wickham and Cunningham Streets. The site, owned by the Bank of New South Wales, was purchased by the Queensland government in November 1898 for £1600. Plans were prepared in 1899 by architect George Payne employed temporarily in the Government Architect's Office. The plans were approved by the government in January 1900, just prior to Federation and the creation of the new Australian Customs Services.

George Payne was a London born and trained architect who arrived in New South Wales c. 1887. In the late 1880s he achieved success in a number of design competitions and in the early 1890s established his own architectural practice in Sydney. He was a foundation member of the Sydney Architectural Association and in 1891–93 its inaugural vice-president. Due to the effects of the economic depression of the 1890s on the architectural profession, Payne gained a temporary position as a draftsman in the Queensland Public Works Department, taking up the appointment in March 1898. It has been suggested that Payne may have been the catalyst for the sophistication of the subsequent work of the Department's Professional Branch. He prepared working drawings for the Rockhampton Customs House, in which he likely contributed to the design detailing and in 1899 designed and documented the Townsville Customs House. With the tropical climate and the government's desire to impress in mind, he designed a colonnaded Romanesque building with an imposing presence to The Strand and shaded, well ventilated interiors. In late 1902 Payne resigned from the Public Works Department to oversee construction of his winning design for St Andrew's Presbyterian Church in Brisbane, for which he acquired a national reputation.

Payne's Townsville Customs House was a brick and stone building of generous design, with high ceilings to allow for maximum air circulation and broad, colonnaded verandahs to provide shade for the internal rooms. While no plans of previous Townsville Customs buildings have been located it is probable that this building provided, for the first time, the traditional arrangement of Customs Service rooms, based on the British tradition of a lofty and impressive "long room" for the reception of the public. It appears to have included residential accommodation for the Sub-Collector of Customs on the upper floor and a basement. As with other Queensland customs buildings designed at this period, the Townsville Customs House, through its architectural distinction, was designed to impress and to present the Customs Service as a crucial arm of government.

Tenders were called in February 1900 and the tender of £26,642, submitted by Messrs Crawford and Cameron of Kangaroo Point, Brisbane was accepted on 7 March 1900. The works supervisor was ES Hunt. The building was constructed of brick and stone with concrete foundations and a plinth of granite from Cockle Bay on Magnetic Island. The use of local labour and materials was intended to stimulate local industry. However, it is thought that the stone dressings (sandstone colonnade, balustrade rails and bases) came from Stanwell near Rockhampton. Construction was completed in late 1902.

Following the federation of the Australian colonies as the Commonwealth of Australia on 1 January 1901, the new federal government assumed responsibility for the fixing and collection of customs duties on goods entering Australia. Customs duties imposed on inter-colonial trade were abolished. The operation of existing coastal customs houses and the establishment of new ones became a Commonwealth function. Under the new arrangements, the Commonwealth assumed control of Queensland's existing customs houses. By December 1908 the Townsville Customs House, valued at £32,201 (£27,261 for the structure and £4,940 for the site), had been transferred to the Commonwealth.

The building was severely damaged by Cyclone Leonta in March 1903 when two chimneys fell and crashed through the roof into an office below. Despite repairs the roof began to leak and in 1910 the tiles were replaced with galvanised iron pan tiles. The tiles on the portico turret roof were left in situ until 1938 when leaks developed and the whole roof was replaced with galvanised steel.

Besides the Commonwealth Customs Service, the building also accommodated a number of Queensland government agencies, including the Stamps and Titles Office (c. 1938), Department of Works, the Bankruptcy Branch and the Electoral Office. During the second world war the Commonwealth Department of Works and Buildings expanded and in 1943 constructed a temporary, two storeyed building in the southwest corner of the grounds. The balcony above the Long Room became office space and a temporary wooden mezzanine floor was erected in the Long Room. Part of the first floor residence became office space for the Department of Works and Buildings and the basement was converted into an air raid shelter with an exit door to Wickham Street. During the war years Works and Buildings was responsible for the construction of war facilities across north Queensland. The department constructed military facilities as well as converting private property to military use and continued to operate from the Customs House until the 1980s.

The roof was damaged again in 1971 by Cyclone Althea, following which the domed roof was reclad with galvanised steel and the turret roof with zinc in 1973.

By 1973 other government departments were again occupying the building including the Department of Works, the Department of Primary Industry and the Department of the Navy.

In 1978 the building was entered on the Register of the National Estate. Restoration work in 1983 won a John Herbert Award for Meritorious Conservation Action. This work included a new roof of specially formed painted steel to the original 1910 profile and gutters replaced to match the original ogee profile. The flat at the west end was vacated and verandah enclosures removed, with restoration of the stone and brick work on the balcony. The building was painted and exterior masonry was dressed and re-pointed.

In 1992 $620,000 was allocated by the Federal government for the restoration and conservation of the building, including the repair of the sandstone, masonry and roof sheeting.

The place is no longer owned by the Commonwealth.

== Description ==
The Townsville Customs House is located on the corner of The Strand and Wickham Street, at the base of Melton Hill overlooking Cleveland Bay. It is one of a number of buildings at the eastern end of the city which are of cultural heritage significance.

The building is a two-storeyed, L-shaped, red brick building with an elaborate semi-circular corner entrance. Verandahs exist on both levels on both street elevations, with iron balustrading on the ground floor. There is a tower on the Strand side, which has a lookout for the observation of shipping. The roof is roll and cap iron.

The ground floor interior includes the Long Room which contains the public counter and work area; a communications room; several general offices; two store rooms; an entrance hall, main stairs and lobby; colonnades; a safe; clearing office; strong room; amenities room; field store; and a flat containing a bedroom, bathroom, balcony and portion of the colonnade.

The first floor contains the Sub-Collector of Customs living area. Within this area are three bedrooms created using modern partitioning, a living room, lounge, kitchen, and colonnades on both the north and south facades, which contain laundry and bathroom facilities. There is also a lobby into the living area (former Titles Office), a staircase lobby, a gallery over the Long Room, a pantry and store.

The surviving internal timber work and timber fittings are of cedar. There are a number of tiled fireplaces throughout the main offices.

There are leadlight windows in the original dome. The cedar and plaster mouldings of the dome are also intact.

== Heritage listing ==
Townsville Customs House was listed on the Queensland Heritage Register on 7 February 2005 having satisfied the following criteria.

The place is important in demonstrating the evolution or pattern of Queensland's history.

The former Townsville Customs House, completed in 1902, was commissioned by the Queensland government prior to Federation during the period of planning for the hand over of government departments and their facilities to the new federal government. Purpose-built as a customs house, the building was used by the Australian Customs Service for close to a century. It is significant historically as an expression of the importance of the customs service to Queensland and to Australia.

The place is important in demonstrating the principal characteristics of a particular class of cultural places.

The former Townsville Customs House is an elegant, imposing brick building with sandstone detailing. It remains substantially intact and is important in demonstrating the principal characteristics of its class of place, being one of a group of imposing, two-storeyed brick and stone customs houses designed by the Queensland Public Works department and constructed around the turn of the 19th and 20th centuries. It is important in illustrating the best work of the office of the Queensland Government Architect and in particular the work of respected architect George Payne. The former Townsville Customs House provides important evidence of adaptation to the climatic requirements of north Queensland particularly in its high ceilings and wide colonnades along the length of both street elevations. It possesses a strong, visual unity in its use of scale, materials and texture and has architectural significance on a national scale.

The place is important because of its aesthetic significance.

Featuring a distinctive entrance portico and domed roof, the former Townsville Customs House contributes to a historic streetscape that includes Anzac Memorial Park, the former Queen's Hotel, the State Government Offices, Tattersalls Hotel, and the former Bank of New South Wales.

The place has a special association with the life or work of a particular person, group or organisation of importance in Queensland's history.

The place has a special association with the work in Townsville and north Queensland of the Queensland and Australian customs services for close to a century.
