= Warwick Post Office =

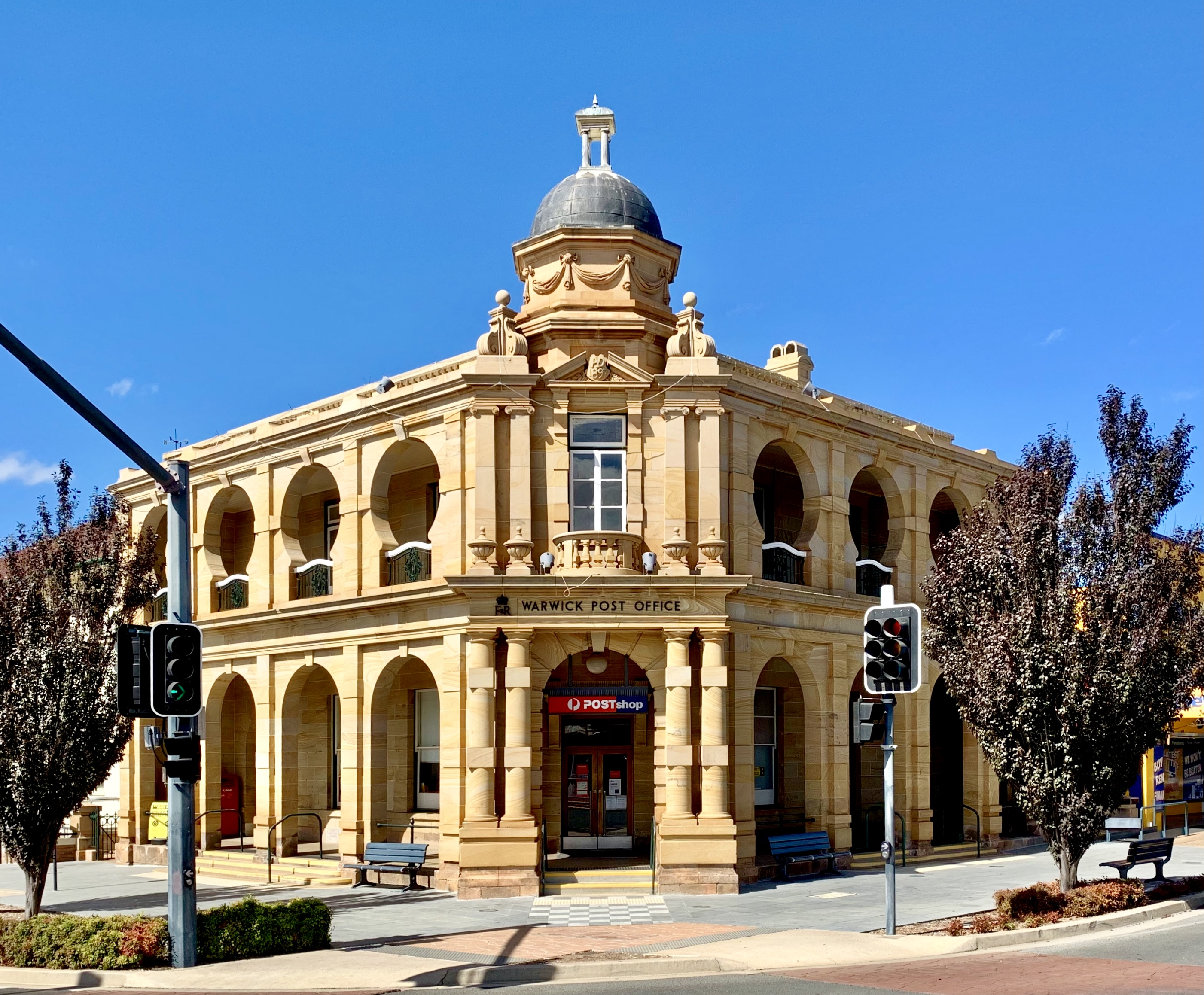
- Warwick Post Office, 2019

- Location within Queensland
- 28.2165°S 152.0330°E
- Location: 98 Palmerin Street, Warwick, Southern Downs Region, Queensland, Australia

History
- Built: 1898

Site notes
- Architect: Alfred Barton Brady
- Owner: Australia Post

Commonwealth Heritage List
- Official name: Warwick Post Office
- Type: Listed place (Historic)
- Designated: 8 November 2011
- Reference no.: 105537

Warwick Post Office is a heritage-listed post office at 98 Palmerin Street, Warwick, Southern Downs Region, Queensland, Australia. It was designed by Queensland Government Architect Alfred Barton Brady and was built in 1898. It was added to the Australian Commonwealth Heritage List on 8 November 2011.

== History ==
Warwick is situated south west of Brisbane on the Condamine River in the southern Darling Downs, and borders on fertile farmlands and the rolling hills of the Great Dividing Range. It is also strategically located at the junction of major highways from Melbourne, Sydney and Brisbane. The area was first settled by Europeans in 1840, with sheep and wool farming established. The town site was selected in 1847, and was named after Warwick, near Coventry, England. After Brisbane, Warwick was one of the earliest towns in Queensland.

The township was proclaimed a municipality in 1861, and the 1860s saw substantial wheat growing in the district, a Cobb and Co. coach service introduced and the expansion of sheep breeding studs. Warwick was connected by the Main Line railway to Ipswich in 1871, and its fertile hinterland became well populated. The town's wide streets were also lined with substantial buildings made from the abundant local sandstone. In 1935 it was proclaimed a City.

When the current Warwick Post Office was constructed in 1898, it replaced an earlier post office of 1884. It is not clear whether this earlier post office was on the same site. The new post office incorporated residential quarters at first floor level, and mail and telephone exchange services at ground level.

The building was designed by the Queensland Government Architect Alfred Barton Brady possibly with a revision by G D Payne for the first floor.

A service wing annexe was added in 1941 and alterations to the post office box lobby occurred in the 1970s or 1980s.

== Description ==
Warwick Post Office is at 98 Palmerin Street, Warwick, comprising the whole of Lot 22 RP147657. It is located on a prominent corner site to Grafton Street and Palmerin Street, which is the city's main thoroughfare and shopping precinct. It replaced an earlier post office designed in a quasi-Georgian Colonial manner of 1884. It is not clear whether this earlier post office was on the same site.

The new building was developed around the diagonals implied in its corner site, presenting a chamfered entrance lobby and a postal hall formed from two linked oblong spaces and an angled and chamfered linking area, left as a single open space. The postal hall was treated compositionally as an angled space "flowing" between the more confined areas of the entrance lobby, service rooms and verandah.

A deep verandah surrounded the grouping on its street side. On the first floor, the bedrooms and other quarters spaces were grouped around a diagonally angled balcony running back into the bedroom areas, and with two deep, flanking verandahs to either side. Externally these spaces were framed in an envelope of rusticated sandstone, being regularly incised on the first floor and with two bands of broadly spaced, raised stone course rustication on each floor. The ground floor is an arcade with Tuscan pilasters partly enveloped by the triple rustication banding. The corner is trabeated in a fairly delicate set of Doric column forms. The ground floor columns were on a novel and unusually deep base and pedestal combination, probably to keep the Tuscan columns in proportion.

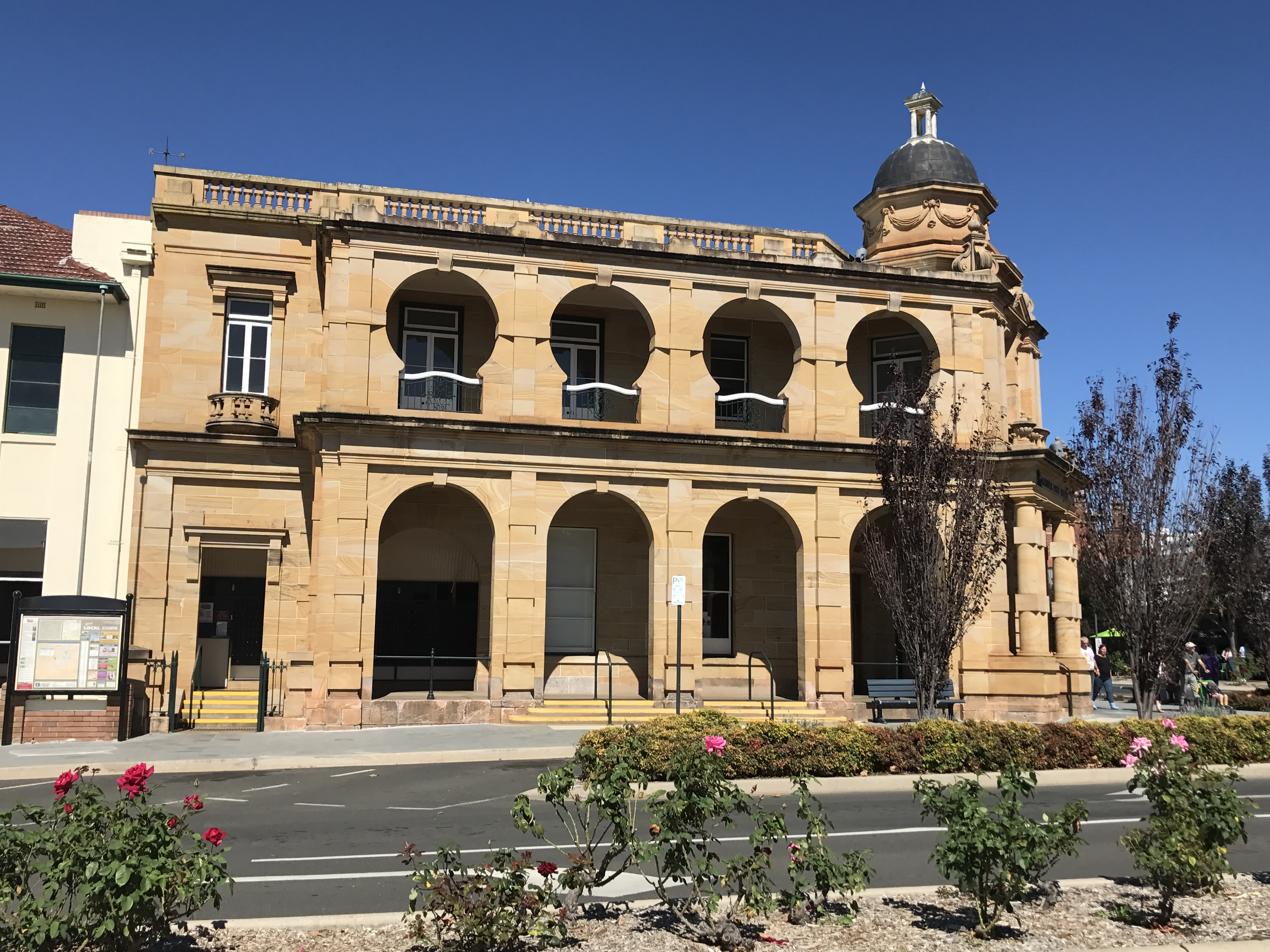
Side elevating showing the horseshoe arches on the first level, 2017

The ground floor has a four-arched loggia to each street elevation and the first floor verandah above is screened by a set of elliptical horseshoe arches, probably the only time these appear in a post office building of this period. The arches, each elliptical in the manner of contemporary railway tunnels, are set, compositionally, in a grid that appears to have been pressed back closer against the roof parapet and other parts of the main façade. Their railings bulge upward in the middle, in an accentuation of Baroque line or the "jumping cornice" often seen in window framing or clock tower mouldings of this period.

Each of the arches has accentuated keystones and their 90 degree side voussoirs also project, resembling the four quadrant-voussoired bullseyes seen on the Ipswich Post Office two years later. The dome drum is an elongated structure, sited well clear of the roof parapet line, and its surface is decorated with a set of eight swags, thus ensuring its prominence when viewed from the street level below.

To the corner is the entry pavilion, consisting of paired Tuscan and Ionic columns, with the Ionic pairs surmounted by scroll consoles supporting a ball finial. The original ground floor entry point –still in use today, though modified - is through an angled, rusticated arch.

Internally the building provided both mail and telephone exchange services. The exchange was located to the south of the mail room and was initially only at ground floor level. On the first floor were the quarters, accessed from the private entrance and stairs to the northeast corner of the building. These spaces were strung along an L-shaped corridor, which ended at a south-facing window overlooking the roof of the telephone exchange below.

At an unknown date, but prior to the major building works of 1941, a stair was constructed within the loggia facing to Palmerin Street.

In 1941, a sizeable two-level extension was constructed adjoining the building's east elevation. The addition was as deep as the original building and doubled the Grafton Street elevation. The building was constructed with rendered brick and roofed with terracotta tile. The 1941 works are further described below under "Existing condition and intactness".

Internally, the ground floor retail space exhibits elements of the original interior scheme as well as the 1941 finishes. There are a pair of polished timber framed glazed entrance doors with a multi-paned transom above, set in to a door frame comprising "moderne" column clusters. The walls have a dado of polished smooth timber ply and the windows retain their original double hung timber framed sash form to the Grafton Street elevation. The unused doors to the centre of the Palmerin Street elevation have a similar toplight form and the framing of the adjacent windows has been altered to a "moderne" profile. The original cast iron columns and v-jointed painted timber ceiling is visible within the space and modern suspended pendant lighting has been installed. Air conditioning services have been suspended below the ceiling and are therefore fully visible within the space. Counter forms and merchandising equipment conform to a standard Australia Post suite of finishes. There is an automatic sliding door to the post office box area, contained within the loggia to Grafton Street and extending into the 1941 wing. The archway at the east end wall of the loggia has been infilled with sandstone and the posting boxes installed in front. An original archway leads into the post office box area from Grafton Street.

The building has two levels, comprising:

- Structural frame: cavity walled brick, honed and split-faced sandstone sheathing. Concrete pier footings. Some steel framing for the windows (in the annexe). Timber window framing elsewhere
- External walls: cavity walled brick, sandstone sheathing, some timber in the additions
- Internal walls: hard plaster over brick, later walling of plaster board, expanded metal lath and plaster to parts of first floor; v-jointed timber lining boards in kitchen
- Floor: Sandstone, rendered brick, hardwood boards and skirtings
- Ceiling: beaded pine boarding, fibro cement, finished concrete
- Roof: corrugated galvanised iron; terracotta tile to the annexe

The 1941 works involved expanding the mail room to the ground floor, the abolition of the first floor quarters and the expansion of the telephone exchange. The ground floor exchange room received an additional level, and the first floor chimneys, servicing the quarters, were removed, the corridor abolished, and the rooms partitioned and altered variously to their new use. The quarters entrance and the stairway from Grafton Street were also abolished and a new service stair, in addition to the external stair in the loggia, were constructed on the site of the former rear verandah, which was sited at the junction of the two wings. The ground floor public areas were also altered with the former ground floor telephone exchange space absorbed into the public area and mail room space, allowing an expansion of both. The entrance doors were relocated into a new vestibule space which led to the expanded public space along the Grafton Street frontage and new doors, still extant but not used, were installed into a former window opening to the Grafton Street loggia. The vestibule works have subsequently been reversed. The east wall was opened out at the ground floor to allow for an expanded mail room and improved staff amenities, and the first floor provided space for equipment and a battery room. This was followed by a series of internal fitouts through the whole complex, culminating in the conversion of the public area to the standard Australia Post retail format in the 1990s.

The mailboxes have been relocated away from their original location on the ground floor verandah.

== Heritage listing ==
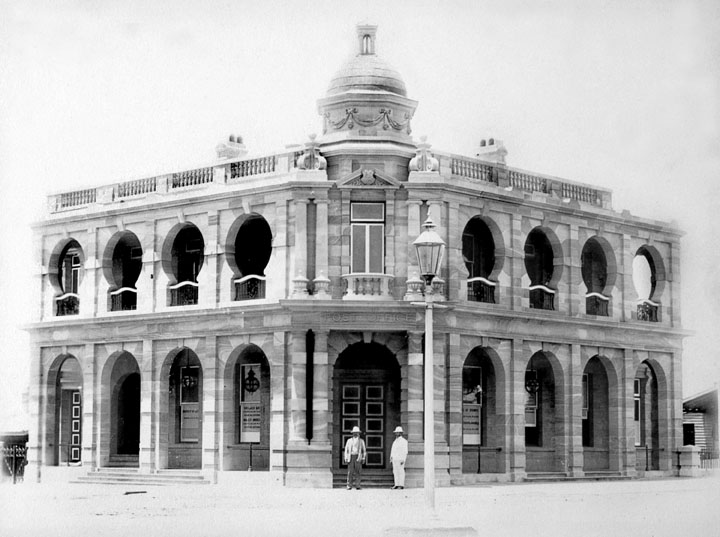
Post Office, newly built

Warwick Post Office was listed on the Australian Commonwealth Heritage List on 8 November 2011 having satisfied the following criteria.

Criterion A: Processes

Warwick Post Office, constructed in 1898, is located on a prominent corner site within a centre renowned for its substantial buildings made from the abundant local sandstone. Its scale and architectural treatment reflect Warwick's prosperity and development in the nineteenth century.

Criterion B: Rarity

Warwick Post Office is distinct among public buildings in Queensland, and possibly more broadly, in that it adopts a "contemporary" Baroque Revival usage at the end of the nineteenth century, as opposed to earlier Baroque treatments of the 1860s-80s. Although it draws together a series of notable British precedents, it does so in a quite original combination. This is accentuated by the use of horseshoe arches on the first floor, seen more commonly in less formal buildings of this period. The post office's use of a hollowed out "envelope" in its external sun protection is also a creative development of JJ Clark's use of it on the Old Brisbane Treasury.

Criterion D: Characteristic values

Warwick Post Office is an example of:

- a post and telegraph office with quarters (second generation typology 1870–1929)
- the Baroque Revival grand Manner in the 1900s fashion, with some Federation elements
- a large annexe building in a 1940s early Modern-Scandinavian Classicist manner
- the work Queensland Government Architect Andrew BartonBrady, possibly assisted by G D Payne

Typologically, the Warwick Post Office originally incorporated residential quarters at first floor level, and mail and telephone exchange services at ground level. Subsequent works, including the 1941 program, expanded the telephone exchange (received an additional level) and mail room to the ground floor, and removed the first floor quarters function including the corridor, partitioning rooms, and removing the quarters entrance and stair from Grafton Street. The ground floor public areas were also altered with the former ground floor telephone exchange space absorbed into the public area and mail room space. The entrance doors were additionally relocated into a new vestibule space which led to the expanded public space along the Grafton Street frontage. These works, and others, have served to impact on the original internal planning and typological attributes of the building.

Stylistically and architecturally, however, Warwick Post Office, designed by Queensland Government Architect AB Brady, and possibly also G D Payne, is distinct among public buildings in Queensland in adopting a "contemporary" Baroque Revival approach in the late nineteenth century. This is accentuated by the use of horseshoe arches on the first floor; the post office's use of a hollowed out "envelope" in its external sun protection is also a creative development. The building is additionally enhanced by its rusticated sandstone treatment and prominent corner siting, the elongated decorated dome drum over the (chamfered) corner entrance pavilion, and the arcaded verandahs (loggias) with distinctive elliptical horseshoe arches.

Criterion E: Aesthetic characteristics

Warwick Post Office has a high level of aesthetic significance deriving from its rusticated sandstone treatment and prominent corner siting, emphasised by the elongated decorated dome drum over the (chamfered) corner entrance pavilion, and the arcaded verandahs (loggias) with distinctive elliptical horseshoe arches.

Criterion F: Technical achievement

Warwick Post Office demonstrates a high degree of creative achievement in its successful late nineteenth century application of the Baroque Revival style in an original combination. The rusticated sandstone treatment is of merit, as is the skilful and elegant application of Tuscan and Ionic columns and pilasters, scroll consoles, swag decoration, and the accentuated keystones and side voussoirs to the elliptical horseshoe arches.

Criterion G: Social value

Warwick Post Office is a locally valued public building dating back to the late 1890 and also one of Warwick's important collection of sandstone buildings.
