= Customs House, Rockhampton =

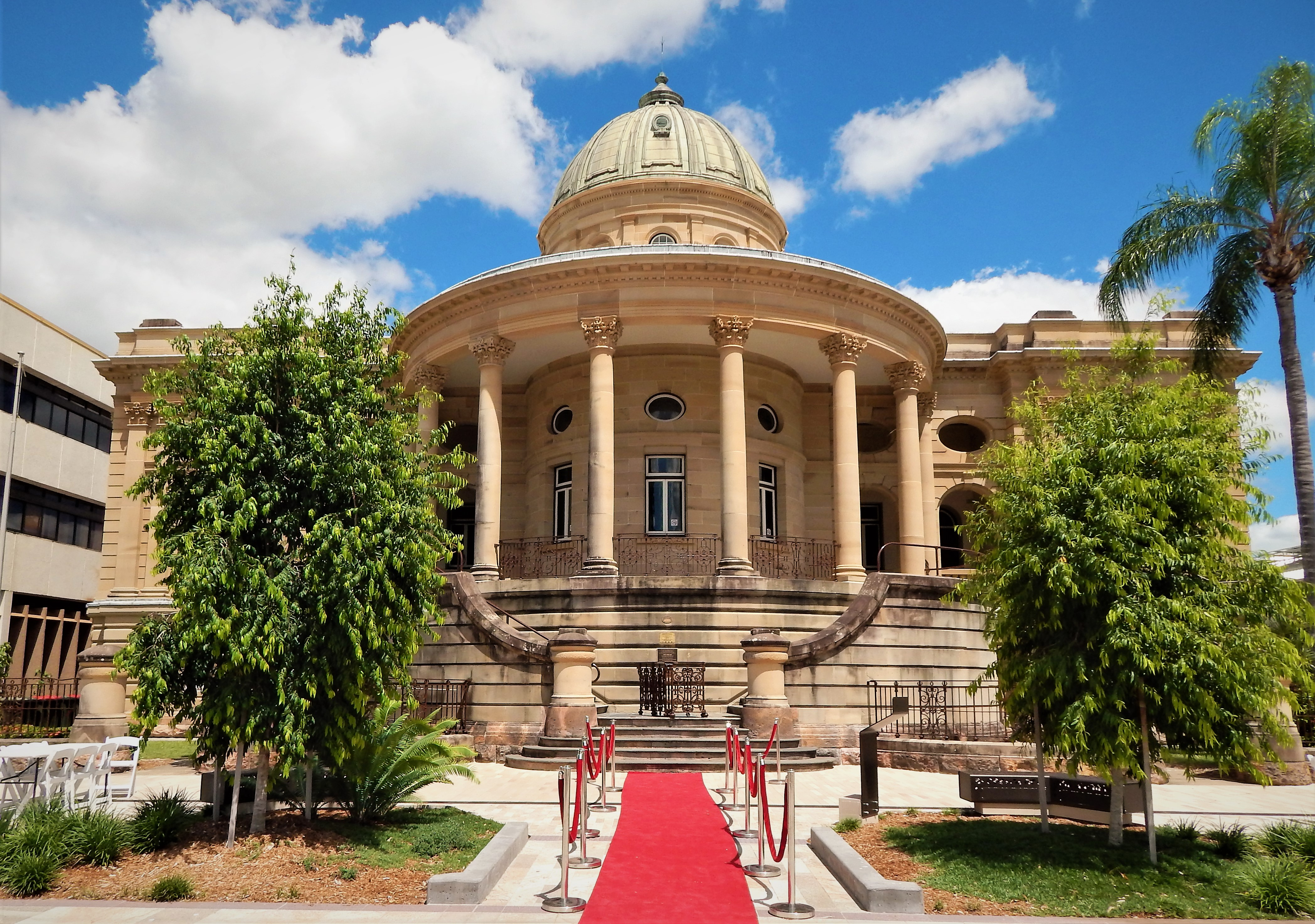
- Customs House, Quay Street, 2018

- Location within Queensland Location within Australia
- 23.3783°S 150.5146°E
- Location: 208 Quay Street, Rockhampton, Rockhampton Region, Queensland, Australia

History
- Built: 1899–1900

Queensland Heritage Register
- Official name: Customs House Rockhampton
- Type: state heritage (built)
- Designated: 7 February 2005
- Reference no.: 600817
- Significant period: 1860s–1900s (fabric); 1860s–1940s (historical)
- Significant components: stables, dome, customs house, store – bond
- Builders: Caskie and Thompson

The Rockhampton Customs House is a heritage-listed customs house at 208 Quay Street, Rockhampton, Rockhampton Region, Queensland, Australia. It was built from 1899 to 1900 by Caskie and Thompson. It was added to the Queensland Heritage Register on 7 February 2005.

== History ==
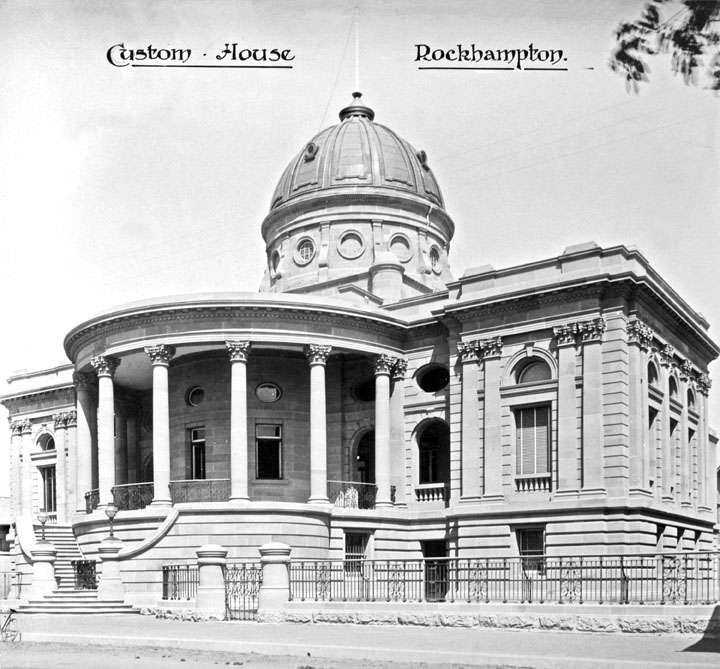
The Customs House around the time of construction

The Rockhampton Customs House was constructed in 1899 as the third Customs House in Rockhampton. It is one of a group of Customs Houses built in Queensland at the turn of the century to the design of innovative and skilful architects of the Public Works Department. The architect responsible for the design of the Rockhampton Customs House is thought to be Thomas Pye with the assistance of George Payne.

The Archer brothers made a private expedition to the Rockhampton district in 1853, and were the first Europeans to record and chart the Fitzroy River. They built a small wharf to allow for the transport of wool bales from their property, Gracemere station. West of the place chosen as the wharf a large bar of rocks prevented further movement upstream for sailing vessels, thereby dictating the siting of the eventual Port of Rockhampton. The short lived Canoona gold rush of 1858 and its massive influx of over eight thousand diggers provided "the landing place" with its first major activity of loading and unloading of vessels.

In 1858 Rockhampton was officially proclaimed a port by the Government of New South Wales (the separation of Queensland did not occur until 1859). The collection of Customs duties and the storage of bonded goods was carried out in a prefabricated timber building which was despatched from the Government of New South Wales. A reserve was declared where the Customs House of 1899 was built, and another timber building was constructed as the Queen's warehouse. The area of the Customs House formed a focal point for transaction of commerce with frontages onto both Quay Street and Little Quay Street (later Quay Lane), and dominating the strip of properties with water frontage.

Within four years, increased use of the Port resulted in the pre-fabricated building becoming inadequate and cramped conditions dictated the need for a new building. However, on 14 August 1862 the timber buildings comprising the Customs House including the Bond Store and Quarters were burnt down. As a result, tenders were called on 27 September 1862 for a new Customs building and this was constructed in the following year. The 1863 Customs House was a single storeyed, masonry building with a slate roof, a storage basement and a colonnaded porch facing Quay St. However the shallow foundations of the building were sunk in clay and the shifting of this strata was to lead to the eventual failure of the structure. A two storeyed brick bond store facing Quay Lane was constructed as part of this phase of development.

In the 1870s the Customs House Reserve was extended when portion 5 of Section 46 the site of the former Royal Fitzroy Hotel was acquired. A single storeyed brick bond store was constructed on this site. Further additions were made to this building in 1879. The building was known as the "Fitzroy Bond", and included frontages to both Quay and Little Quay Streets.

By the 1880s, the differential settlement of the soil around the foundations of the buildings on the Customs House site led to major structural problems. Repair work was undertaken at the recommendation of the Queensland Colonial Architect. However, this work failed to rectify the problem and it was necessary to attempt repairs a number of times during the 1880s and 1890s. Deputations were made from the Rockhampton Chamber of Commerce and Rockhampton Municipal Council in 1890 seeking replacement of the building. Because the growth and prosperity of Rockhampton as a new capital city was crucial to the separation of Central Queensland movement, who sought to create a new state in north Queensland, it was thought that new public buildings constructed in Rockhampton should be equal in prominence and design to those constructed in Brisbane, the capital of Queensland. In 1889 a large new Customs House was constructed in Brisbane and therefore the new Customs Houses throughout Queensland, and particularly those planned for Rockhampton and Townsville, would reflect the high standard of this building and the prominence of the northern cities.

At the time that funding was being sought for the construction of a new Customs House in Rockhampton the economic situation in Queensland was worsening with the depression of the 1890s. The Queensland Colonial Architect, Alfred Barton Brady, estimated some £6000 was required to finance a massive repair program to reconstruct the Rockhampton Customs House, money that was unavailable. Temporary premises were sought for Customs staff for three years until repairs could be made. Brady was aware of the need for a new building but was also aware of the reduced spending of the Colonial Government to cover new projects as a result of the depression. Despite more alterations and repairs, major structural problems had reappeared by 1897. With accommodation in the Customs House untenable by this stage, tenders were called for the refitting of the Queen's Warehouse as a temporary Customs House.

In November 1897, the Government Architect A B Brady submitted plans for approval to Treasury for a new Customs House. Estimated cost was to be £12,000. Completion was expected to take eighteen months. At this time other Customs Houses were being constructed by the colonial government in other ports along the Queensland coast, in locations such as Townsville and Maryborough. The construction of the Rockhampton Customs House was part of a major public works construction program leading to Federation of not only customs houses but also state government offices and post offices.

Tenders were called in March 1898 for removal of the old Customs House and demolition took place in May 1898. In August 1898, the Department of Public Works accepted the tender of Messrs Caskie and Thompson of Brisbane for £16,534.10. 2 to build the present Customs House. The design was produced under the guidance of Mr. A B Brady, the Government Architect. Chief Draughtsman Thomas Pye has been attributed with the design and George Payne is thought to have been responsible for many of the innovative and interesting details of the building. George Payne was also thought to be responsible for the design of the Townsville Customs House which was constructed soon after.

To secure adequate foundations for the building, Brady adopted a pile and rail method, whereby wooden piles 30 feet (9.1 m) by 18 inches (460 mm) were driven into the ground, with 28 pounds (13 kg) iron shoes driven to a depth of 20 feet (6.1 m), cut off at ground level, then tied on each side with rows of steel rails, with the tops of the piles and rails embedded in concrete. This was intended as a method to create a stable environment for the foundations of the building. As a result of this planning for the foundations, the building basement was situated above ground level and was to be utilised as the Queens' warehouse.

The building was constructed from Stanwell freestone dressings to the front and sides and a rendered brickwork superstructure. A reserve for quarry purposes had been gazetted at Stanwell for the supply of stone for the structure prior to construction. Most of the stone was procured from the Number 4 quarry at Stanwell. The Works Department ensured that Stanwell freestone would be used on the side walls and return fronts, although these initially had been specified to be rendered masonry. J W Esdale was the stonemason, J Innis the foreman of works and the Corinthian order capitals were carved by employees of the London firm, Farmer and Binnelly. Although the contract was to be completed by March 1900, the contractors requested an extension of time as a result of wet weather and labour shortages. Unusually the Royal Coat of Arms was not included on the building, though this is thought to have been as a result of the shortage of stonemasons rather than an oversight.

At the completion of the Customs House, Caskie and Thompson tendered for and were awarded other works within the Customs House reserve associated with ancillary buildings as well as landscaping. The stables were to be rebuilt, to incorporate lavatories, paved two stall stable, a feed room and coachhouse. As well a stone boundary wall along Quay Street, fencing, gates, driveways, stables and lavatories were to be constructed at a cost of £1615.00. Along the boundary wall fronting Quay Street three entrances with stone pillars and wrought iron gates were provided. Double iron gates were provided for the entry to the Fitzroy Bond. The tender was approved on 10 October 1900.

The Customs House provided a large central Long Room where business was transacted, a Queen's warehouse, ten offices and a strong room.

Faced with local freestone from Stanwell Quarries, the other portion being of brick set in cement, except the base course, which is of Brisbane tuff. The outer dome is of timber covered in Muntz metal, the inner dome being of coke and cement concrete. The long room occupies the centre part of the upper floor with the principal offices on either side. Below the long room is the King's warehouse, with shipping and other offices at the sides. The outer palisading to street front is of hammered iron on freestone and porphyry walling.

Final cost of construction was £17 390/2/9 and ancillary buildings including walls and gardens cost £1 616/11/6.

The building was opened at a time when rivalry between Gladstone and Rockhampton was fierce and Rockhampton businesses were attempting to block construction of a trunk railway line between the two ports from the south. Rockhampton had been faced with a major deficiency as a port by being situated on the tidal Fitzroy River. Dredging programs were necessary to maintain a navigable channel to the sea. Construction of deep water ports at Broadmount and Port Alma both failed to rectify this problem of providing a deep water port for Rockhampton. By the turn of the century the actual area of river frontage used for wharfage had moved further downstream away from the area dominated by the new Customs House. Steam vessels of up to 4,000 long tons (4,100 t) could make their way upriver. Larger vessels required unloading in Keppel Bay and transfer to lighters. After Federation customs collection was handed over to the Commonwealth although the Queensland Government maintained responsibility for maintenance on the building.

After completion of the Customs House warehousing, necessary for storage of bonded goods, was found to be in excess of requirements. A result of this was that the Fitzroy Bond building was (Portion 3 of the Reserve) sold to the Queensland Government in 1906.

The importance of the Customs House to the maritime activities of the Port of Rockhampton diminished gradually. During the Second World War, war ships and supply vessels navigated to the town reach. However the advent of bulk shipping accelerated the decline of the area of the town wharves. In the 1960s major upgrading of the Port Alma wharves was undertaken, and road connection was also provided to Rockhampton. However, this development was overshadowed by the construction of deep water bulk handling facilities at Gladstone starting in the 1960s and accelerating through the 1970s and 1980s. The Rockhampton river port and town wharves were closed to shipping in 1966. With a diminishing role in the activities of the Customs Service in the river port, the Customs House was adapted for uses other than the traditional collection of duties and storage of dutiable goods. The ancillary buildings of Customs House have been altered to reflect this adaptation. The Bond Store was converted into a Laboratory, and the stable and coach building was converted to provide animal pens for use by the Department of Health. A toilet block was also provided in 1923 along the northern boundary adjacent to the stables.

Further adaptations to the interior of the Customs House reflect the tenancy of the building by various Government departments. In the 1960s, the Department of Labour and National Service had become the major tenant. The ground floor offices on the southern side of the building were partitioned, and an amenities area was provided in the Queen's Warehouse. The office for the Federal Member for the Rockhampton/Fitzroy electorate was also located in the building. The Long Room was divided internally with removable partitions. Within the area of the Queen's warehouse further partitioning was introduced to increase office space. Air conditioning was introduced in 1971 to offices on the southern side of both levels.

Decreasing importance of the Customs Department saw it being limited in space to an area of the Queen's warehouse, and bond store. The Commonwealth Employment Service Regional office occupied the ground floor. In 1986 all employees of the Federal Government departments resident in the Customs House vacated the building and transferred to newly constructed offices.

In May 1987 the building was acquired by the Rockhampton City Council. At the time of the handover of the building it was anticipated that the Customs House would be used as either a museum or some form of tourist attraction. In 1989 the Rockhampton City Council sponsored a tenant for the Customs House- Skillshare Capricornia. Skillshare occupied various parts of the building and the laboratory/bond store for its activities. The Long Room, restored to its original layout, has been used for social and cultural functions including book launches, and art exhibitions. Part of the J. W. Wilson (Rockhampton Architect, designer of the School of Arts building) family furniture collection is stored within the office space in the building.

To commemorate the centenary of Federation in 2001, the Rockhampton Customs House was one of 43 major projects that received funding through the Queensland Heritage Trails Network Project. The $110 million Queensland Heritage Trails Network was an Australian first, funded through the Queensland and Commonwealth Governments in partnership with local government authorities and local communities. The project was designed to provide the city of Rockhampton with a central cultural attraction. The ground floor office partitions and air conditioning were removed and the area was refitted and currently houses the "Customs House Discovery Centre". The refit included the installation of a smaller air condition unit to the rear of the building on the ground floor. The Discovery Centre, which incorporates static and multimedia displays, introduces visitors to the city's history, Customs House, Quay, river and people of Rockhampton today. The first floor continues to be used for meetings, conferences, functions, etc. In 2003, a lift was installed in the south-west corner of the building, at the rear of the site.

== Description ==
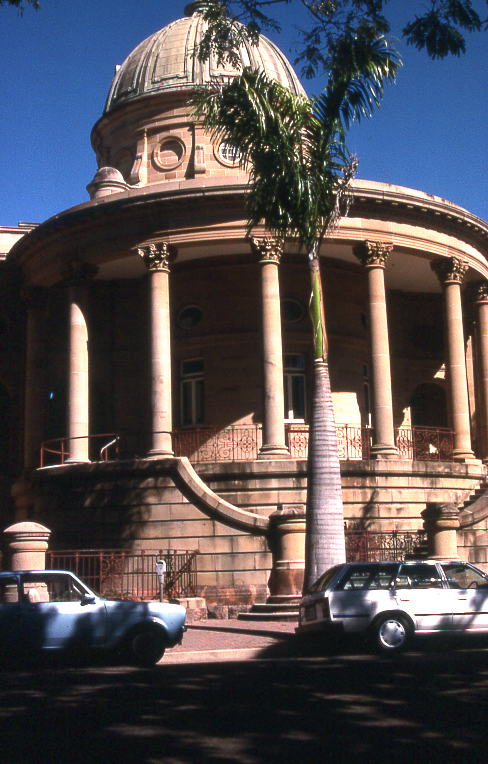
Semi-circular entrance portico

The Rockhampton Customs House is a well composed and substantial sandstone and rendered brick building prominently sited on Quay Street overlooking the Fitzroy River. Most of the buildings in Quay Street are built up to the line of the footpath except the Customs House which is set back from the street and has a large semi-circular entrance portico which contributes to its prominence in the street.

On the Customs House site is the Customs House, facing Quay Street and to the rear of this a two storeyed former bond store and in the north eastern corner a one storeyed former stables building which has a more recent addition along the north eastern property line. The former stables and the Customs House are contemporary.

The Customs House is a two storeyed rectangular planned building with a semi-circular porch projecting centrally from the north eastern facade to Quay Street and flanked by end bays. The building employs many classical architectural features. The principal floor housing the long room and large office spaces is on the first floor, beneath which, on the ground floor are secondary spaces. The first floor seems to sit on the heavy base provided by the ground floor which, externally, is heavily rusticated with banding.

The principal facade, facing Quay Street, is dominated by the centrally placed round porch to which access is given via two stone stairs starting from concrete steps from the footpath and curving around the projecting porch to the first floor. The porch comprises a row of Corinthian columns following the curve of this facade of the building, which support a semi-circular entablature over which a skillion roof sits. Flanking the porch are short arcaded sections which terminate and are aligned with the end bays of the building. The arcaded sections are formed from full length arched openings which have Italianate balustrading. Above the arches and aligned with them are elliptical openings. The symmetrical end bays have rusticated sandstone faces and an arched opening at first floor level which extends to the ground floor in the form of a long rectangular window opening. The base of the opening at first floor level has an Italianate balustrade. Flanking the opening at first floor level are pairs of Corinthian pilasters. These pilasters seem to support a string moulding which aligns with the entablature of the porch, forming a cornice along the entire length of the facade, above which a short parapet conceals the roof.

Projecting from the hipped, corrugated iron roof, centrally over the principal room of the building is a large dome clad with a copper and zinc alloy, known as Muntz metal sheeting. The metal sheets have been laid radiating from the central metal lantern in twelve sections with border mouldings which define the sections. The dome rests on a substantial sandstone drum which is pierced with twelve regularly spaced oculi or round windows, every second and third ones of which are blind openings. These are divided by slender pilasters which expand outward toward their base to form buttressing elements. The pilasters seem to support an entablature which surrounds the crown of the drum.

The north west and south east elevations of the building, continue the classical detailing of the principal facade of the end bays, with a series of round arched openings separated by pairs of Corinthian pilasters. The cornice detail and ground floor rustication continues around to these sides as well.

The rear of the building is of rendered brick, and is without the rustication and detailing which characterises the other facades of the building. Again a semi-circular bay projects from the centre of the facade and this is lined with rectangular window openings at ground and first floor levels. From this projects a two storeyed square planned section.

Access is provided to the Long Room from the porch through two doors on either side of the central projecting semi-circular bay. The doorways housing the double half glazed doors are surmounted with relief lettering "H.M. CUSTOMS" above which sits a corniced shelf. Rectangular windows line the face of the semi-circular bay and forming a lintel to these is a string moulding. The floor of the porch is concrete as are the floors throughout the first floor of the building. A wrought iron balustrade links the columns lining the porch.

Internally the first floor of the Customs House is arranged with a large central space, the Long Room, under the dome, and two long rooms flanking this along the sides of the building and articulated externally as the end bays. The flanking rooms are long spaces with plastered ceilings and walls, elaborate cornice and high timber skirting. Generally these rooms retain much of their original fittings, including joinery, plaster ceiling roses, ventilation shaft covers.

The Long Room is a grand internal space, classically proportioned and detailed in keeping with the parti of the building. The room comprises a central square planned space with the interior of the dome projecting above. Because the dome rests on a square base, that is the building, a pendentive, or series of curved inverted triangular sections in the corners of the square plan, join at their tops to form a circular crown on which the drum of the dome rests. The interior of the dome is ornamented with various moulded courses and panels and is regularly pierced with openings. Several round arched doorways provided access to this space from the corridors which flank the Long Room. A section of an early timber desk/counter is fitted within the space.

The ground floor is arranged about a central room beneath the Long Room with hallways running either side off which offices are found in the end bays of the building. Generally the ground floor ceiling is of timber boarding, the walls are plastered and modest skirting boards and cornices have been used. Much joinery remains and this is of excellent quality with unusual five panelled doors. Chimney pieces remain in some of the rooms and these are timber framed with tiled and marbled infill panels. Centrally located downstairs is a room formerly known as the Queens Warehouse, a large semi-circular space defined by a curved brick wall, forming the foundations of the porch the internal line of which it is directly above. The external line of the porch is supported on sandstone foundations which form another wall separated from the brick foundation wall by a walkway. The ceiling in this space is clad with small gauge corrugated iron. The Queen's Warehouse houses the "Customs House Discovery Centre". The interpretive centre includes wall mounted display cases, free-standing display cases, the use of crates and sacks and mannequins. The main feature is a reconstructed wharf sub-structure. The free standing cases and exhibits are secured by the placement of weights within the cases. A lightweight grid is suspended from the ceiling toward the northern end of the area, indicating Rockhampton street signs and for possible use in later exhibition design. A wall mounted display case is also located in this area. Some multimedia facilities are included in the interpretation centre.

The former stable building which is on the north west corner of the site, with an elevation facing Quay Lane. This is a small rendered brick building with rustication similar to that found on the Customs House. The corrugated iron roof is half hipped and surmounting it are two decorative ridge ventilators. Four door openings and two window openings, plainly detailed, are found on the south eastern wall. The wall facing Quay Street has a centrally located double window.

With a wall to Quay Lane is the former two storeyed brick Bond Store. The corrugated iron roof of this building has slightly overhanging eaves which are lined with diagonal timber boarding. The ground floor is rendered brick and the upper floor is face brick with white tuck pointing. Six paned vertical sash windows with heavy timber frames and mullions are found on all facades and these are awned with corrugated iron awnings supported on substantial timber brackets with infill battening in some places.

The bond store is accessed from a door adjacent to the Customs House, though which an entry hall is reached where a timber stair provides access to the first floor. Rooms open from the entrance hall on the ground floor. The rooms on the lower level have many early features; joinery and ceiling panelling, though most have been painted and covered with surface mounted conduits. The upper floor is generally re-ordered with recent partitioning concealing an early layout and any early features.

== Heritage listing ==
The Rockhampton Customs House was listed on the Queensland Heritage Register on 7 February 2005 having satisfied the following criteria.

The place is important in demonstrating the evolution or pattern of Queensland's history.

The Customs House, constructed in 1899, is significant as it represents the development of Rockhampton as the regional centre of central Queensland and in particular Rockhampton's role as the principal port of this region. At the time of its construction, the Customs House was seen as a symbol of prosperity and progress in the city.

The place is important in demonstrating the principal characteristics of a particular class of cultural places.

The building demonstrates the development of customs houses in Queensland and is significant as a good example of the substantial customs houses built along the Queensland coast at the turn of the century and designed by the Public Works Department.

The place is important because of its aesthetic significance.

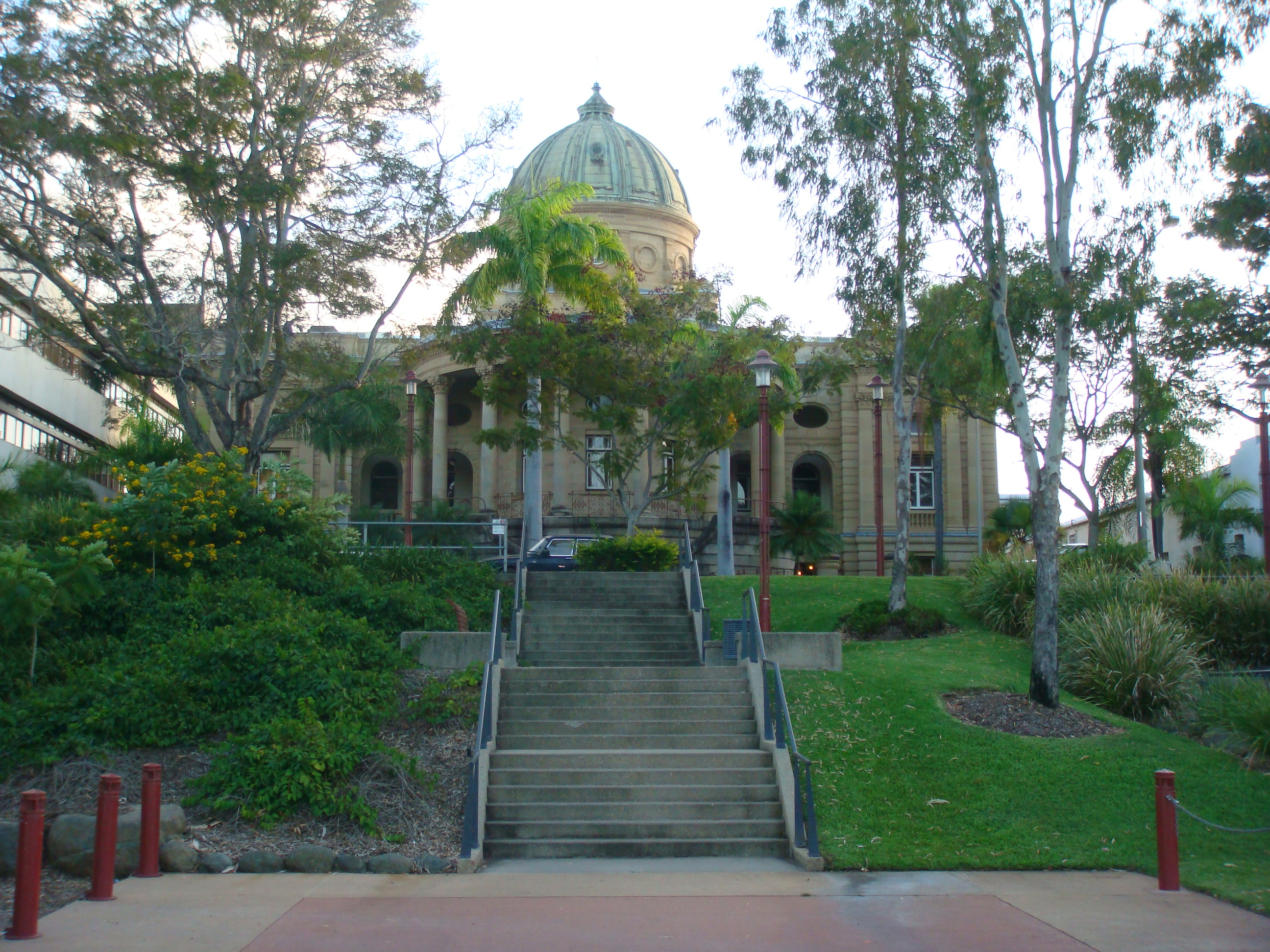
Customs House, as seen from the river, 2009

The Customs House has great aesthetic significance, it is a prominently sited building on an important street facing the Fitzroy River and a well composed substantial sandstone building with considerable architectural merit.

The place is important in demonstrating a high degree of creative or technical achievement at a particular period.

The foundation work supervised by AB Brady shows an innovative engineering solution to the problems of unstable foundations that led to the collapse of many Rockhampton buildings.

The place has a special association with the life or work of a particular person, group or organisation of importance in Queensland's history.

The building, designed by Thomas Pye with George Payne, has special associations with them and the Public Works Department who produced many fine public buildings at the turn of the century.
