= The Amazing Race Australia 5 =

- Season 5
- Presented by: Beau Ryan
- No. of teams: 16
- Winners: Brendon Crawley & Jackson Dening
- No. of legs: 24
- Distance traveled: 17,000 km (11,000 mi)
- No. of episodes: 24

Release
- Original network: Network 10
- Original release: 1 February – 28 March 2021

Additional information
- Filming dates: 6 October – 14 November 2020

Series chronology
- ← Previous; Season 4 Next → Season 6

The Amazing Race Australia 5 is the fifth season of The Amazing Race Australia, an Australian reality competition show based on the American series The Amazing Race and the second installment of Network 10's iteration of the show. Hosted by Beau Ryan, it featured sixteen teams of two, each with a pre-existing relationship, in a race around Australia due to the COVID-19 pandemic to win A$250,000.

This season visited four states and two territories and travelled over 17,000 kilometres (11,000 mi) during twenty-four legs. Starting in Newell, Queensland, racers travelled through Queensland, the Northern Territory, South Australia, Tasmania, New South Wales and the Australian Capital Territory before finishing atop Mount Kosciuszko. New twists introduced in this season include forcing the first team to arrive at a U-Turn to use it, stowaway teams and the First Class Pass, which was awarded to the winners of non-elimination legs, allowed them to skip the next leg and give a Salvage (an advantage) and a Sabotage (a disadvantage) for the last two teams during the next leg. The season premiered at 7:30 pm on 1 February 2021 and concluded on 28 March 2021.

Cowboys Brendon Crawley and Jackson Dening were the winners of this season, while Gold Coast friends Ashleigh Lawrence and Amanda Blanks finished in second place and Sikh friends Jaskirat Dhingra and Anurag Sobti finished in third place.

== Production ==
=== Development and filming ===
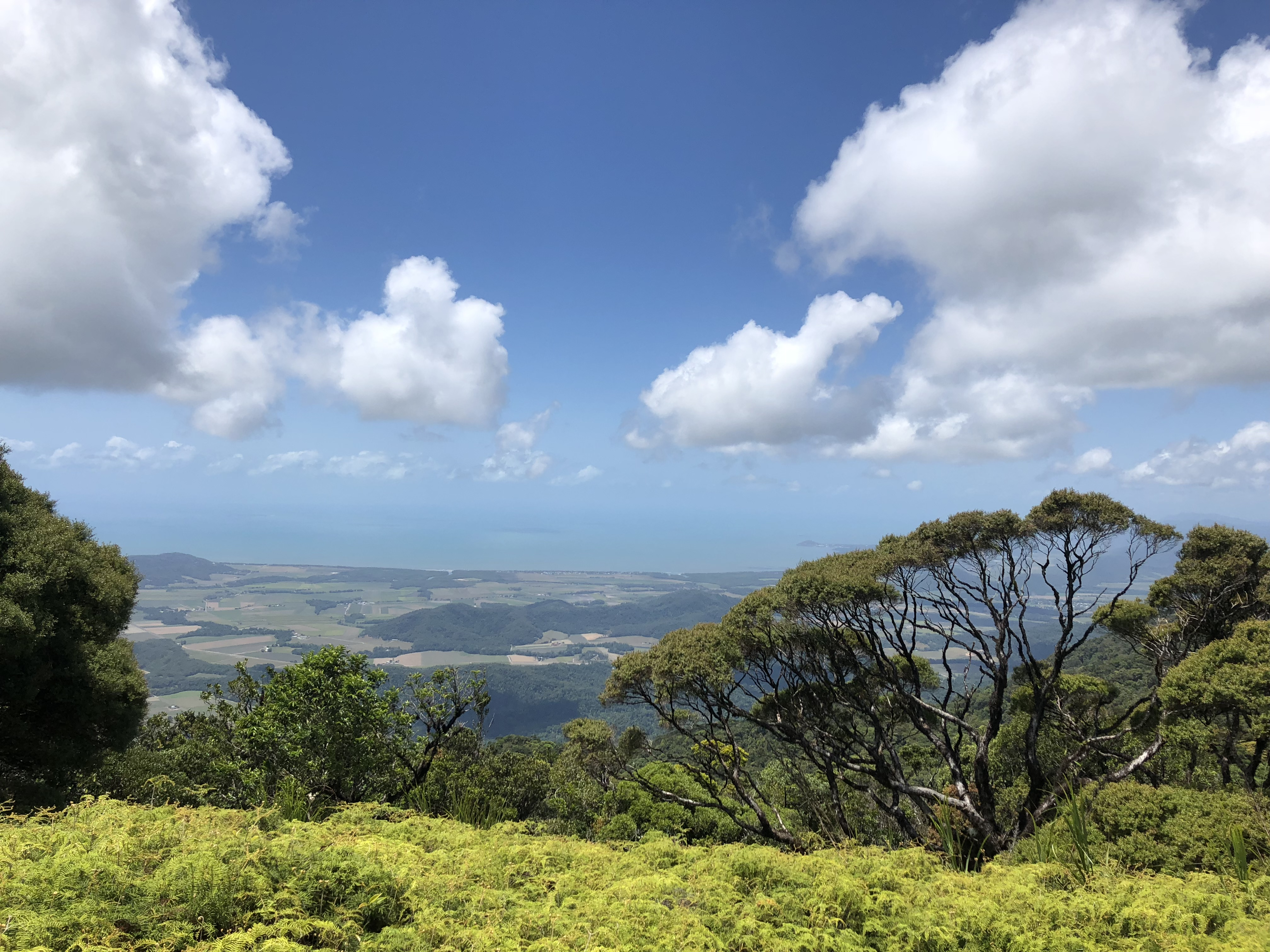
Teams began their race across Australia in Far North Queensland at the edge of the Daintree Rainforest.

On 10 October 2019, the show's renewal was announced at the 2020 upfronts prior to the premiere of the previous season with the second season from Network 10 initially set to air in late 2020.

After production of the thirty-third season of the American edition of The Amazing Race was halted in February 2020 due to the COVID-19 pandemic, questions were raised over whether a new Australian edition would be filmed later in the year. A Network 10 spokesperson later stated that the network was seeking advice to create a safe route and establish proper safety measures. Host Beau Ryan stated on The Kyle and Jackie O Show that the season would not be cancelled, but the outbreak had caused producers to change the season's route twice and that the season could film only in Australia if the outbreak worsened. The initially planned international route for this season included visits to India, Brazil and Europe. On 11 March, a Network 10 spokesperson confirmed that the season would film only in Australia. Filming was set to occur between June and July 2020 but was postponed due to interstate travel restrictions. Beverley McGarvey, the chief content officer and executive vice president of ViacomCBS in Australia and New Zealand, stated that the network was committed to filming the season once state borders reopened. In an interview on Studio 10, Beau Ryan stated that the show created COVID safety officers, contestants and crew members would be regularly tested and provided with personal protective equipment and the show would be travelling to areas with lower populations to reduce personal interactions.

According to Beau Ryan, production would take place over eight to nine weeks starting in late September with a two-week quarantine before filming, and Victoria and Western Australia would be hard to include due to border and lockdown restrictions. The planned legs in Western Australia were to be Perth, Rottnest Island and Broome, but were eventually cancelled and replaced by reused legs in Queensland. These Western Australian locations were later visited during the final three legs of the following season.

Following the quarantine period to medically clear the teams and production, filming started in Queensland in early October 2020. During filming, producer Yasmin Kara broke her vertebrae while testing a challenge that involved jumping into the water. Production concluded in mid-November.

Chris Diloreto & Aleisha Groth set a record for most consecutive legs run in a single season at 22 legs. With eight leg wins, Ashleigh Lawrence & Amanda Blanks broke the record for most leg wins by an all-female team, previously held by Natalie & Meaghan from The Amazing Race Canada 2, and tied the record for most leg wins in a single season.

This season's visits to South Australia, Tasmania and the Australian Capital Territory meant that all of Australia's states and territories were featured at least once among the first five seasons of The Amazing Race Australia.

==== Format changes ====
This season introduced two new game mechanics: the First Class Pass and Stowaway teams.

- The First Class Pass was awarded to the first-place team of a non-elimination leg. The recipients would be able to skip the next leg, during which they would enjoy a special reward experience. Additionally, the holders would allocate The Salvage (an advantage) and The Sabotage (a disadvantage) to the bottom two teams of the non-elimination leg.
- At random intervals, new teams would be introduced at the start of specific legs. These teams would be referred to as stowaway teams.

Additionally, unlike other versions of The Amazing Race and previous seasons of The Amazing Race Australia, the first team to arrive at a U-Turn was required to use it. In other versions, this decision was optional for all teams, unless it was used by a team who arrived earlier).

A new twist called the T-Junction was announced in pre-season press but did not appear this season. The T-Junction would have been similar to an Intersection, but with all remaining teams split into two larger teams for the rest of the leg. The first team to arrive at the T-Junction would create both super-teams. The second super-team to arrive at the Pit Stop would then have to choose one team from the group to eliminate. The twist of combining pairs into two larger teams was previously included on Australia vs New Zealand season on the Seven Network's iteration of the series in the "Nation vs Nation" challenges (in which teams joined with their countrypeople for a particular challenge).

=== Casting ===
Casting for the fifth season of The Amazing Race Australia initially opened during the finale week of the previous season on 2 December 2019. As the number of coronavirus cases began to decline across much of the country and some states started the process of reopening borders, casting resumed on 16 June 2020. Casting was initially set to close on 26 July 2020 but was extended to 2 August 2020.

30,000 people applied for this season. Ultimately only 16 teams were chosen to compete – 14 teams began racing from the first leg with two additional "stowaway teams" entering the competition in the seventh & tenth legs. At 16 teams, this season set the record for the most teams running a season of The Amazing Race, which was only beaten by the following season's cast of 20 teams.

=== Marketing ===
Telstra, Bundaberg Brewed Drinks, Subway and Disney+ served as sponsors for this season.

== Cast ==
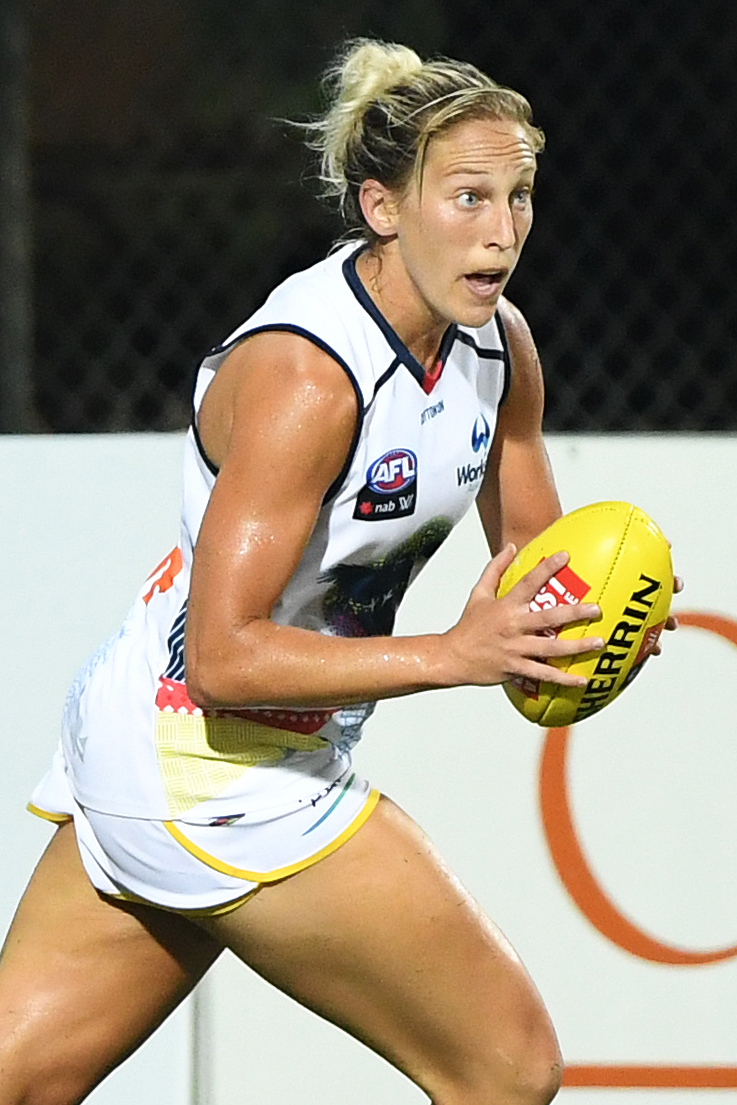
Marijana "MJ" Rajčić

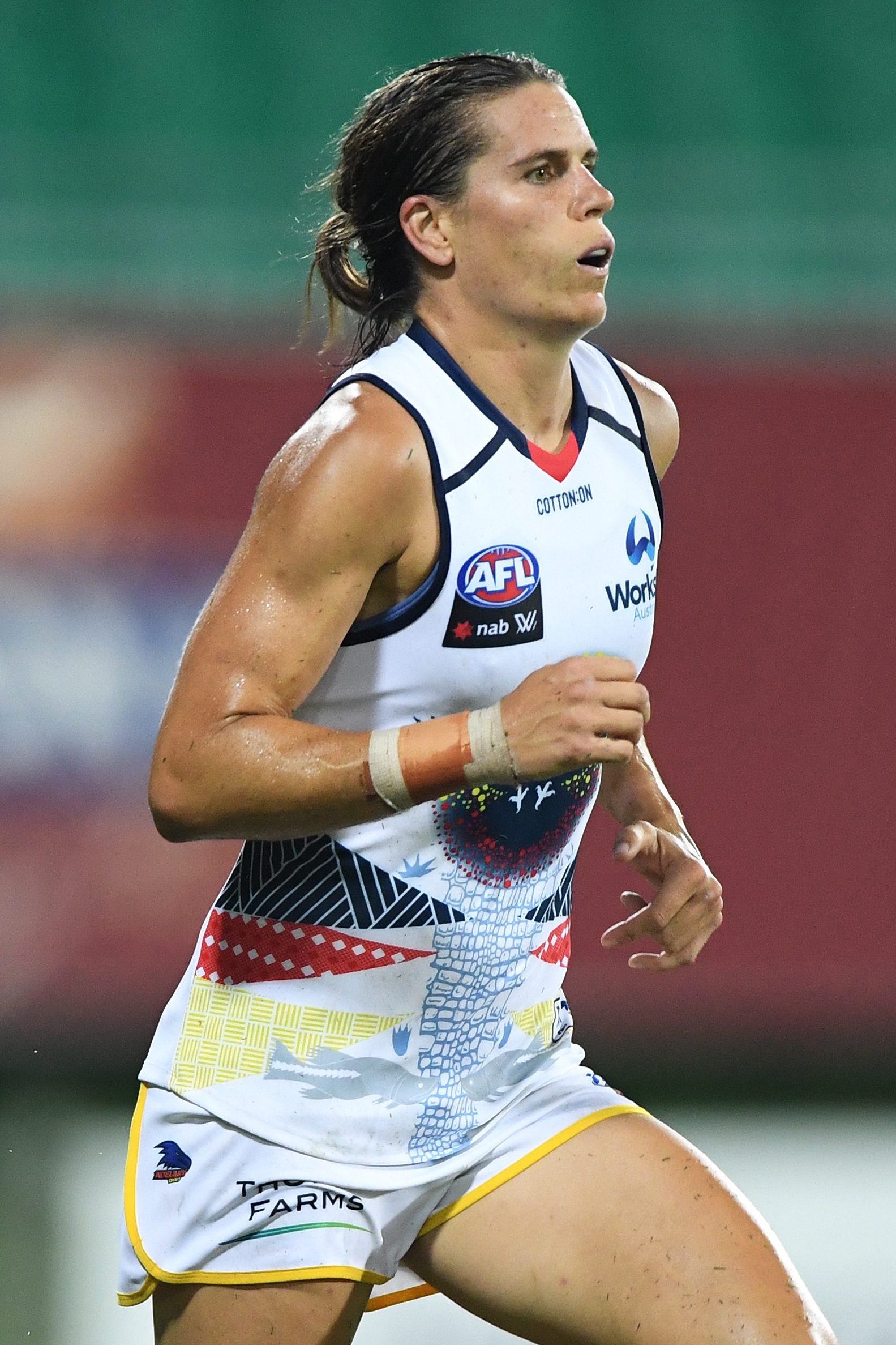
Chelsea Randall

The cast included actress Aleisha Rose, Dancing with the Stars professional dancer Violeta Mugica, footballers Marijana "MJ" Rajčić and Chelsea Randall and professional bodybuilders Stan Turek and Wayne Marino.

Contestants	Age	Relationship	Hometown	Status
Dwes Wigann-Dann	(Returned to competition)			Eliminated 1st (in Mossman, Queensland)
Katherine Dann	(Returned to competition)			Eliminated 1st (in Mossman, Queensland)
Alex Newell	23	Twin Models	Sydney, New South Wales	Quit (in Cairns, Queensland)
Jack Newell	23	Twin Models	Sydney, New South Wales	Quit (in Cairns, Queensland)
Jude Richards	49	Mums	Brisbane, Queensland	Eliminated 3rd (in Longreach, Queensland)
Shannon Nay	45	Mums	Gold Coast, Queensland	Eliminated 3rd (in Longreach, Queensland)
Malaan Ajang	27	Childhood Friends	Melbourne, Victoria	Eliminated 4th (on Palm Island, Queensland)
Tina Kuek	26	Childhood Friends	Melbourne, Victoria	Eliminated 4th (on Palm Island, Queensland)
Shane Wilson	47	Parents	Wollongong, New South Wales	Medically removed (in Horseshoe Bay, Queensland)
Deb Wilson	41	Parents	Wollongong, New South Wales	Medically removed (in Horseshoe Bay, Queensland)
Jobelle Collier	29	Daughter & Dad	Shepparton, Victoria	Eliminated 6th (on Green Island, Queensland)
Rani Alegre	52	Daughter & Dad	Shepparton, Victoria	Eliminated 6th (on Green Island, Queensland)
Sefa Palu	29	Besties	Sydney, New South Wales	Eliminated 7th (in Darwin, Northern Territory)
Jessica Matavao	32	Besties	Sydney, New South Wales	Eliminated 7th (in Darwin, Northern Territory)
Dwes Wigann-Dann	32	Kimberley Cousins	Ardyaloon, Western Australia	Eliminated 8th (in Coober Pedy, South Australia)
Katherine Dann	31	Kimberley Cousins	Broome, Western Australia	Eliminated 8th (in Coober Pedy, South Australia)
Jordan Saisi	23	Dancing Exes	Melbourne, Victoria	Eliminated 9th (in Lincoln National Park, South Australia)
Violeta Mugica	22	Dancing Exes	Melbourne, Victoria	Eliminated 9th (in Lincoln National Park, South Australia)
Stan Turek	36	Bodybuilders	Richmond, New South Wales	Eliminated 10th (in Brisbane, Queensland)
Wayne Marino	26	Bodybuilders	Richmond, New South Wales	Eliminated 10th (in Brisbane, Queensland)
Holly Edwards	25	Power Couple	Sydney, New South Wales	Eliminated 11th (in Hobart, Tasmania)
Dolor Edosomwan	26	Power Couple	Sydney, New South Wales	Eliminated 11th (in Hobart, Tasmania)
MJ Rajčić	31	Footy Mates	Adelaide, South Australia	Eliminated 12th (in Launceston, Tasmania)
Chelsea Randall	29	Footy Mates	Adelaide, South Australia	Eliminated 12th (in Launceston, Tasmania)
Skye-Blue Henderson	27	Siblings	Melbourne, Victoria	Eliminated 13th (in Leura, New South Wales)
Jake Henderson	29	Siblings	Melbourne, Victoria	Eliminated 13th (in Leura, New South Wales)
Chris Diloreto	31	Geek & Princess	Brisbane, Queensland	Eliminated 14th (in Silverton, New South Wales)
Aleisha Groth	30	Geek & Princess	Brisbane, Queensland	Eliminated 14th (in Silverton, New South Wales)
Jaskirat Dhingra	29	Super Sikhs	Sydney, New South Wales	Third place
Anurag Sobti	29	Super Sikhs	Sydney, New South Wales	Third place
Ashleigh Lawrence	32	The Gold Coast Girls	Gold Coast, Queensland	Runners-up
Amanda Blanks	29	The Gold Coast Girls	Gold Coast, Queensland	Runners-up
Brendon Crawley	25	Cowboys	Yass, New South Wales	Winners
Jackson Dening	23	Cowboys	Tamworth, New South Wales	Winners

== Results ==
The following teams are listed with their placements in each leg. Placements are listed in finishing order.

- A red placement with a dagger (†) indicates that the team was eliminated.
- An underlined blue placement with a double-dagger (‡) indicates that the team was the last to arrive at a Pit Stop in a non-elimination leg.
- An italicized and underlined placement indicates that the team was the last to arrive at a Pit Stop, but there was no rest period at the Pit Stop and all teams were instructed to continue racing.
- A green ƒ indicates that the team won the Fast Forward.
- A brown ⊃ indicates that the team used the U-Turn and a brown ⊂ indicates the team on the receiving end of the U-Turn.
- A green FCP indicates that the team won the First Class Pass in the previous leg and could skip this leg.
- A violet + indicates that the teams encountered an Intersection.
- A purple § indicates that the team received the Salvage advantage.
- An orchid $ indicates that the team received the Sabotage penalty.

Team placement (by leg)
Team	1	2	3	4	5	6	7	8	9+ (Note: This leg featured an Intersection. The teams were paired up thus: Ashleigh & Amanda, Chris & Aleisha, Skye-Blue & Jake and Holly & Dolor, and Jordan & Violeta, Brendon & Jackson, Dwes & Katherine and Jaskirat & Anurag.)	10	11	12+ (Note: This leg featured an Intersection. The teams were paired up thus: Ashleigh & Amanda and Holly & Dolor, Chris & Aleisha and Stan & Wayne, Brendon & Jackson and Jaskirat & Anurag, and Skye-Blue & Jake and Jordan & Violeta.)
Brendon & Jackson	12th	3rd	2nd	1st	3rd	6th	5th	6th	5th	4th	9th‡	4th§ (Note: This team received the Salvage advantage on this leg.)
Ashleigh & Amanda	8th	4th	3rd	3rd	1st	FCP (Note: This team won the First Class Pass on the previous leg and could skip this leg.)	6th	3rd	1st	2nd	3rd	1st
Jaskirat & Anurag	1st	1st	FCP	8th	2nd	3rd	1st	8th	7th$ (Note: This team received a Sabotage penalty on this leg.)	3rd	5th	5th
Chris & Aleisha	3rd	8th	8th	7th	4th	5th	4th	2nd	2nd	1st	8th (Note: Chris & Aleisha initially arrived 7th, but were issued a 20-minute penalty for timing out of the challenge at the Adelaide Oval. Stan & Wayne checked in during this penalty time, dropping Chris & Aleisha to 8th.)	6th$
Skye-Blue & Jake	6th	10th	4th	5th	5th	1st	7th	7th	4th	8th	6th	7th
MJ & Chelsea							3rd (Note: MJ & Chelsea entered the competition in seventh leg at the Darwin Airport and began racing five minutes after the other teams left the airport.)	1st	FCP	5th	1st	FCP
Holly & Dolor	9th	11th	5th§	9th⊂ (Note: Shane & Deb chose to use the U-Turn on Holly & Dolor.)	6th	8th	8th	4th	8th (Note: This team arrived last at the Pit Stop, but they were instructed to continue racing.)	9th	4th	2nd
Stan & Wayne										6th (Note: Stan & Wayne entered the competition on the tenth leg at Manguri Siding and began racing after the other teams left the train.)	7th	3rd
Jordan & Violeta	4th	5th	10th	11th	10th‡ (Note: Jordan & Violeta arrived last at the Pit Stop but were not eliminated on account of Shane & Deb having been medically removed from the race.)	7th$	9th	5th	3rd	7th	2nd	8th†
Dwes & Katherine	14th†		9th (Note: Dwes & Katherine returned to the competition at Longreach Airport after Alex & Jack withdraw from the competition.)	10th (Note: Dwes & Katherine initially arrived 9th, but were issued a 10-minute penalty for hitching a ride in a private car. Holly & Dolor checked in during this penalty time, dropping Dwes & Katherine to 10th.)	7th	4th	2nd	9th‡ (Note: Dwes & Katherine initially arrived 6th, but were issued a 30-minute penalty because Katherine had quit the Roadblock. Three teams checked in during this penalty time, dropping Dwes & Katherine to last.)	6th§	10th†		
Sefa & Jessica	7th	9th	7th	4th	8th	2nd	10th†					
Jobelle & Rani	13th (Note: Jobelle & Rani initially arrived 11th, but were issued a 30-minute penalty for failing to complete the "Bombs Away" task. Two teams checked in during this penalty time, dropping Jobelle & Rani to 13th.)	7th	6th	6th	9th	9th†§						
Shane & Deb	5th	2nd	1st	2nd⊃	† (Note: Shane & Deb were medically removed from the competition because Shane injured his knee during the first Roadblock at Horseshoe Bay.)							
Malaan & Tina	11th	6th	11th (Note: Malaan & Tina initially arrived 8th, but were issued a 10-minute penalty for breaking a puzzle piece during the dinosaur jigsaw task. Three teams checked in during this penalty time, dropping Malaan & Tina to 11th.)	12th†								
Jude & Shannon	10th	12th‡ (Note: Jude & Shannon initially arrived 11th, but were forced to go back to retrieve their backpacks. Holly & Dolor checked in during this time, dropping Jude & Shannon to 12th.)	12th†$									
Alex & Jack	2nd	† (Note: Alex & Jack chose to withdraw from the competition before the second leg began.)										

Team placement (by leg)
Team	13	14+ (Note: This leg featured an Intersection. The teams were paired up thusly: Brendon & Jackson and Ashleigh & Amanda, Jaskirat & Anurag and Skye-Blue & Jake, Holly & Dolor and Chris & Aleisha, and MJ & Chelsea and Stan & Wayne.)	15	16	17+ (Note: This leg featured an Intersection. The teams were paired up thusly: Ashleigh & Amanda and Skye-Blue & Jake, MJ & Chelsea and Jaskirat & Anurag, and Chris & Aleisha and Brendon & Jackson.)	18	19	20	21	22	23	24
Brendon & Jackson	2nd	1st	FCP	6th	6th‡	2nd§	4th	3rd	1st⊃ (Note: Brendon & Jackson chose to use the U-Turn on Chris & Aleisha.)	2nd	1st	1st
Ashleigh & Amanda	1st	3rd	5th	5th	1st	FCP	1st	1st	3rd	1st	3rd‡	2nd
Jaskirat & Anurag	3rd	2nd	3rd	4th	4th	1st⊃ (Note: Jaskirat & Anurag chose to use the U-Turn on MJ & Chelsea.)	5th‡	4th	2nd	3rd	2nd	3rd
Chris & Aleisha	5th	7th	2nd$	3rd	5th	4th$	2nd	2nd	4th⊂‡	4th†		
Skye-Blue & Jake	4th	4th	6th	1stƒ (Note: This team won the Fast Forward on this leg.)	2nd	3rd	3rd	5th†				
MJ & Chelsea	7th (Note: MJ & Chelsea initially arrived 5th, but they had missed the second Detour and only arrived at the Pit Stop by chance. They had to go back to complete the Detour before they could check in. Two teams checked in during this time, dropping MJ & Chelsea to 7th.)	6th	1st	2nd	3rd	5th†⊂						
Holly & Dolor	6th	5th	4th	7th†								
Stan & Wayne	8th‡	8th‡	7th†§									

== Race summary ==
The complete route of The Amazing Race Australia 5.

Destinations	Air travel Rail travel Water travel Bus travel Helicopter travel Bicycle travel Gondola travel
Route Markers	Detour Roadblock Fast Forward U-Turn Intersection Pit Stop

=== Leg 1 (Queensland) ===
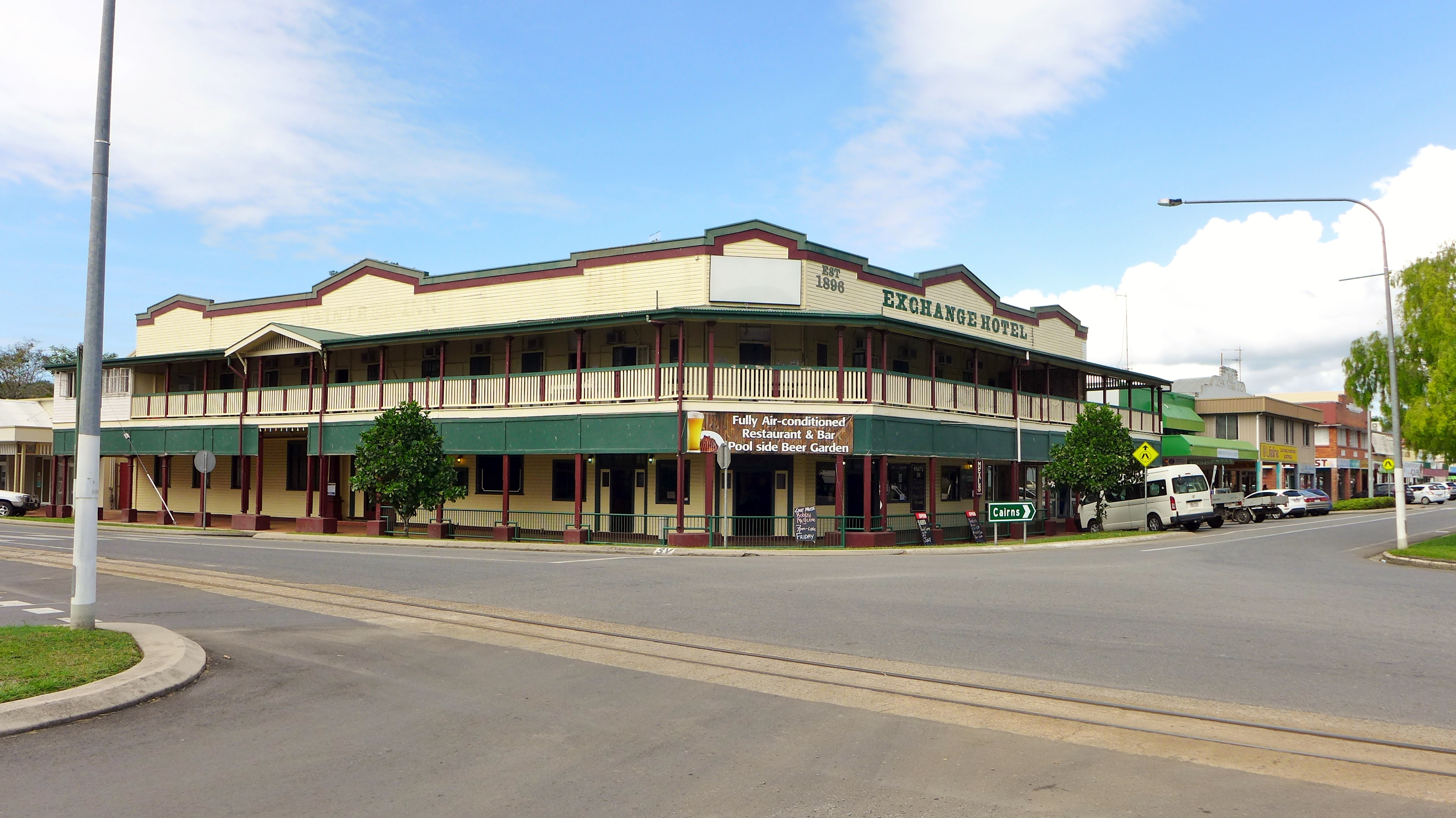
The first Detour took place at the Exchange Hotel in Mossman.

- Episode 1 (1 February 2021)
- Prize: A holiday to Cairns, Queensland, and the Great Barrier Reef with accommodation at the Daintree Ecolodge (awarded to Jaskirat & Anurag)
- Eliminated: Dwes & Katherine

Locations

- Newell, Queensland (Newell Beach) (Starting Line)
- Mossman (Drumsara Station)
- Mossman (Exchange Hotel)
- Mossman (Mossman Sugar Mill)
- Mossman (Mossman River)
- Mossman (Daintree Rainforest)

Episode summary

- Teams set off from Newell Beach and had to decide whether to run one kilometre (0.62 mi) up the beach or travel three kilometres (1.9 mi) upriver in a slow tinny to find a car that would serve as their transportation for this leg. As only seven cars were available at the end of each route and seven tinnies available on the river, only seven teams could take each of the two options.
- Teams were then directed to drive to Drumsara Station in Mossman. There, one team member had to don a classic flight suit and swing in the air to toss four balls thrown to them by their partner into a target within five minutes to retrieve their next clue, which directed teams to the Exchange Hotel. Only four teams could complete this task at a time.
- This season's first Detour was a choice between Food or Bev. In Food, teams had to properly peel two kilograms (4.4 lb) of prawns to receive their next clue. In Bev, both team members had to deliver one tray each carrying seven schooners of beer without spilling them to receive their next clue.
- After the Detour, teams had to drive to the Mossman Sugar Mill, where they had to find a pair of tongs in a pile of cut sugarcane and a sugar cube in a pile of raw sugar. Teams then had to drop the sugar cube into a large teacup to receive their next clue, which directed them to the Mossman River. There, teams had to catch twenty cane toads by hand and place them in a box to receive their next clue. Teams then had to check in at the Pit Stop in the Daintree Rainforest.

Additional note

- Before the competition began, teams experienced a Welcome to Country ceremony from the Kuku Yalanji.

=== Leg 2 (Queensland) ===
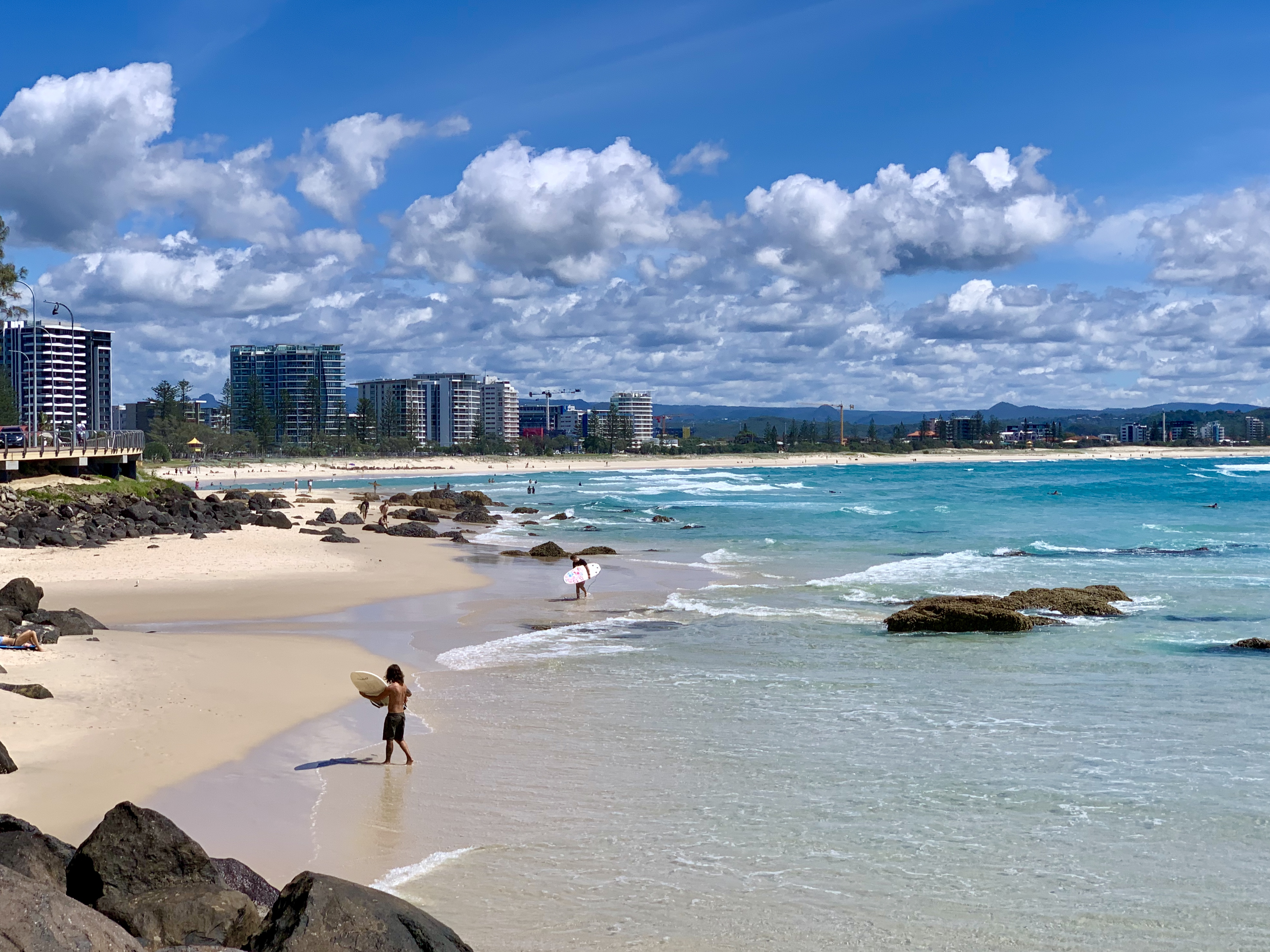
In Gold Coast, teams took part in a lifeguard exercise on North Kirra Beach.

- Episode 2 (2 February 2021)
- Prize: The First Class Pass, which included a luxury experience at the Saltbush Retreat in Longreach to be enjoyed while the remaining teams competed in leg 3 (awarded to Jaskirat & Anurag)
- Quit: Alex & Jack

Locations

- Cairns (Cairns City Library)
- Cairns → Gold Coast or Brisbane (Unaired)
- Gold Coast (Kirra Surf Life Saving Club)
- Gold Coast (Gold Coast Aquatic Centre) or Miami (UGG Since 1974)
- Gold Coast (Mike Hatcher Junior Motorcycle Club)
- Gold Coast (Telstra 5G Innovation Centre)
- Gold Coast (Wet'n'Wild Gold Coast)

Episode summary

- At the start of this leg, teams were instructed to fly to Gold Coast. Once there, teams had to travel to the Kirra Surf Life Saving Club in Coolangatta, where one team member had to learn a series of flag commands to direct their partner, who had taken an inflatable rescue boat offshore to a series of buoys. After retrieving an Amazing Race flag from each correct buoy, teams received their next clue.
- This leg's Detour was a choice between Swim to the Beat or Snappy Feet. In Swim to the Beat, teams had to perform a synchronised swimming routine with the Gold Coast Mermaids to the satisfaction of the Olympic coach to receive their next clue. In Snappy Feet, teams had to select a pair of Ugg boots from a display of over a thousand pairs and stick a hand into one boot each until they found a "golden surprise" – a gold mousetrap, hidden among boots with normal mousetraps – to receive their next clue.
- In this season's first Roadblock, one team member had to complete one lap around a motocross course on a dirt bike in under 55 seconds to receive their next clue.
- After the Roadblock, teams had to travel to the Telstra 5G Innovation Centre, where they had to search for the location of the Pit Stop, which was displayed on an electronic billboard outside the building. Teams then had to travel by G:link to Wet'n'Wild Gold Coast, where they had to ride the AquaLoop before they could check in at the Pit Stop.

Additional notes

- Alex & Jack chose to withdraw from the competition before the leg began. Aside from this, this was a non-elimination leg.
- While unaired in the episode, some teams chose to fly into Brisbane Airport and then travel by taxi to the Gold Coast area.
- Olympic swimmer Emily Seebohm appeared as the Pit Stop greeter for this leg.

=== Leg 3 (Queensland) ===
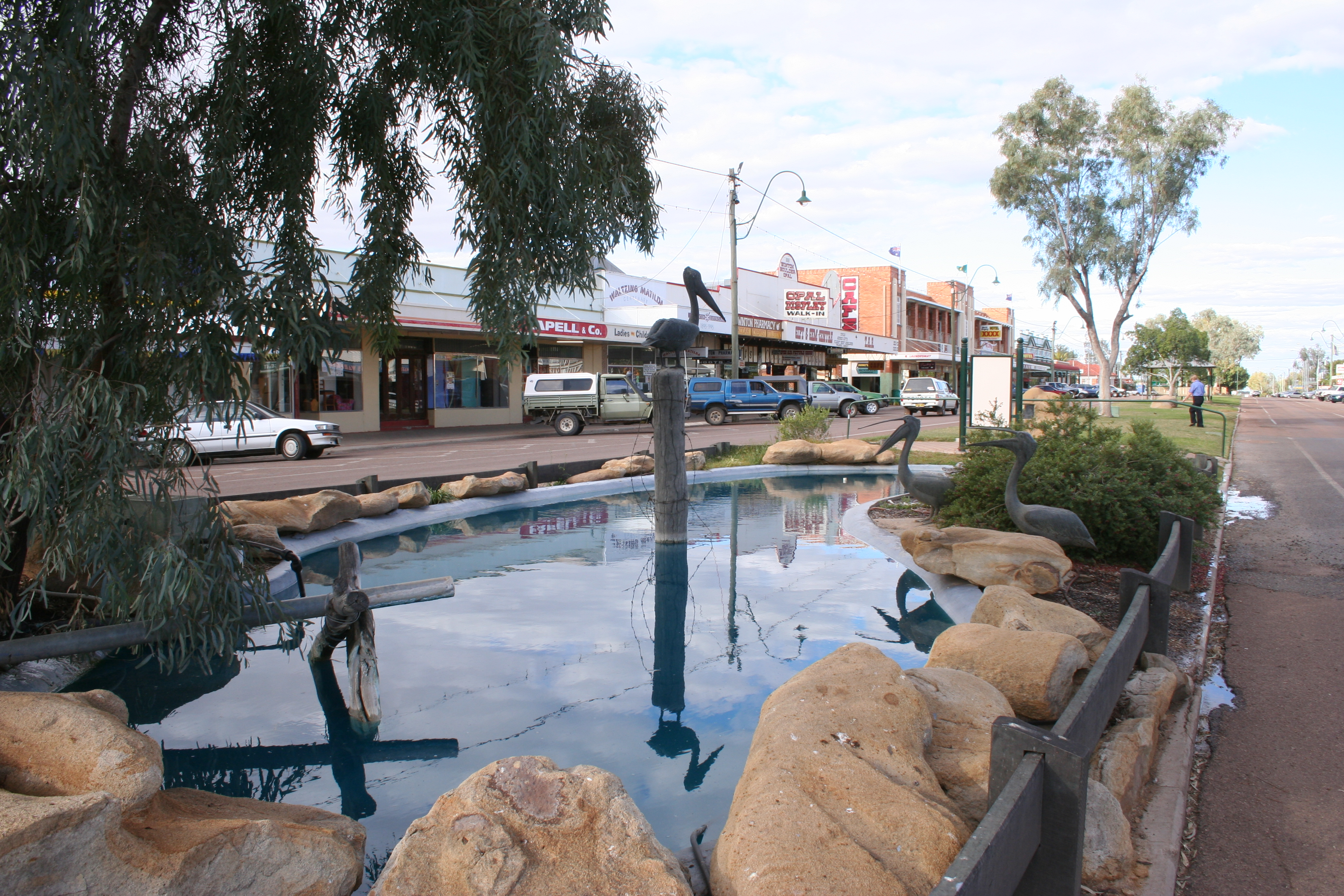
After travelling to Winton, teams took part in the local Dunny Derby.

- Episode 3 (3 February 2021)
- Prize: A holiday at the Sea World Resort on the Gold Coast, as well as Warner Bros. Movie World and Wet'n'Wild Gold Coast (awarded to Shane & Deb)
- Eliminated: Jude & Shannon

Locations

- Gold Coast (Gold Coast Bulletin Centenary Park)
- Brisbane → Longreach (Longreach Airport)
- Winton (North Gregory Hotel)
- Winton (Australian Age of Dinosaurs Museum)
- Winton (Winton Truck Museum)
- Longreach (Camden Park Station or Longreach Solar Farm)
- Longreach (Australian Stockman's Hall of Fame)

Episode summary

- At the start of this leg, teams were instructed to fly to Longreach. At the Longreach Airport, teams experienced a Welcome to Country ceremony from the Iningai. Teams then drove to the North Gregory Hotel in Winton in the same order that they had arrived at the previous Pit Stop. Outside the hotel, teams participated in the local Dunny Derby. Teams had to pull a local in a mobile dunny around a racetrack while one team member balanced a bedpan full of dunny water. After completing a lap, teams had to pour the remaining water into a bucket and repeat the derby until they filled the bucket to receive their next clue.
- Teams then had to drive to the Australian Age of Dinosaurs Museum, where they had to search a marked area to find 33 puzzle pieces and assemble them to form a dinosaur skeleton to receive their next clue. If teams broke any of the bones, they received a time penalty at the Pit Stop. Teams then had to drive to the Winton Truck Museum, where they had to sign up for one of eleven departure times, each five minutes apart, the next morning. In the morning, teams had to fit two 80-kilogram (180 lb) tyres onto a road train to receive their next clue.
- This leg's Detour was a choice between Pick or Polish. In Pick, teams had clean three freshly shorn fleece and roll a bale of wool to receive their next clue. In Polish, teams had to clean 42 solar panels to receive their next clue.
- After the Detour, teams had to check in at the Pit Stop: the Australian Stockman's Hall of Fame in Longreach.

Additional notes

- Dwes & Katherine re-entered the competition on account of Alex & Jack having quit prior to the previous leg.
- Having won the First Class Pass on the previous leg, Jaskirat & Anurag were able to skip this leg and enjoy a reward instead.
- Jaskirat & Anurag gifted the Salvage advantage to Holly & Dolor, which allowed Holly & Dolor to jump the queue at any challenge during this leg. They chose to jump the queue at the Winton Truck Museum sign-up board. Likewise, Jaskirat & Anurag assigned the Sabotage penalty to Jude & Shannon, which required that one team member not be allowed to talk for the entirety of this leg. Shannon did not talk.
- Comedy duo the Crackup Sisters appeared as the Pit Stop greeters for this leg.

=== Leg 4 (Queensland) ===
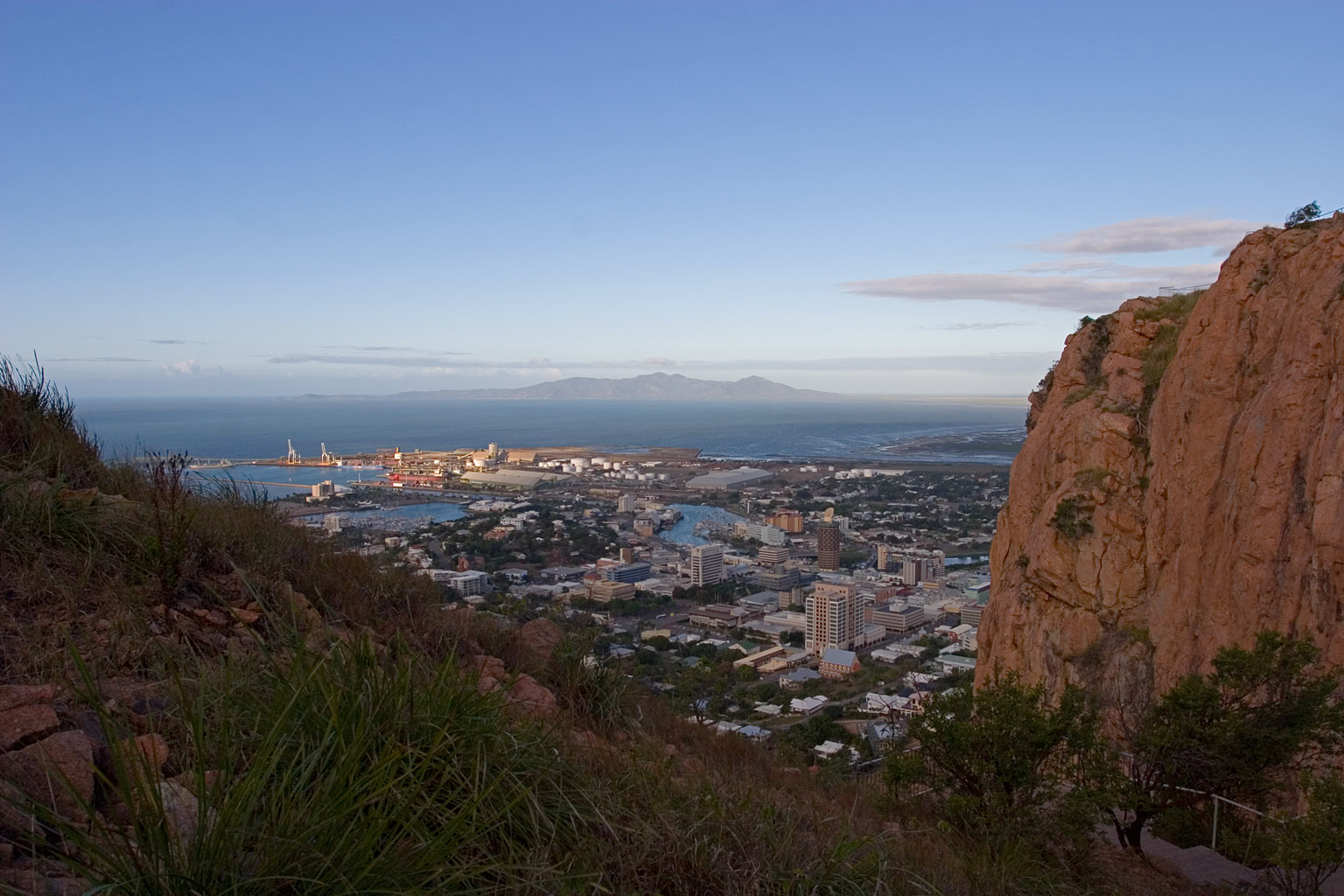
The Roadblock in Townsville required racers to abseil down Castle Hill.

- Episode 4 (7 February 2021)
- Prize: An island getaway at the Orpheus Island Lodge on Palm Island (awarded to Brendon & Jackson)
- Eliminated: Malaan & Tina

Locations

- Longreach → Townsville (Townsville Airport)
- Townsville (Castle Hill)
- Townsville (Townsville Airport – Hinterland Aviation Office)
- Townsville → Palm Island
- Palm Island (Story Tree)
- Palm Island (Fred Clay Freedom Park)
- Palm Island (Bwgcolman Radio or Sunset Snack Bar)
- Palm Island (Palm Island Airport)
- Palm Island (St. Michael's Catholic Primary School)

Episode summary

- During the Pit Stop, all teams flew from Longreach to Townsville and began the leg at Townsville Airport.
- In this leg's Roadblock, one team member had to abseil 100 metres (330 ft) down Castle Hill at night and hook their team picture to a BRAWN or BRAINS board before receiving their next clue.
- At the Hinterland Aviation office, teams had to sign up for one of five charter flights departing the following morning to Palm Island. Once there, teams had to travel to the Story Tree, where they received a Welcome to Country ceremony from Manbarra and Bwgcolman elders before receiving their next clue. Teams then had to travel by bus to the Fred Clay Freedom Park, where they had to choose a necklace: red for men and yellow for women. The symbol on the necklace determined which traditional Imbala dance teams had to correctly perform in order to receive their next clue.
- This leg's Detour was a choice between On Air or On Time. In On Air, teams had to memorise and perfectly deliver a Bwgcolman Radio advert in under 25 seconds to receive their next clue. In On Time, teams had to prepare a pizza named after a National Rugby League team and deliver it to a home flying the team's flag to receive their next clue.
- After the Detour, teams had to travel by bus to the Palm Island Airport, where they had to cut a 20-metre (66 ft) patch of grass using tiny scissors to receive their next clue. Teams then had to check in at the Pit Stop: St. Michael's Catholic Primary School.

Additional note

- The BRAWN or BRAINS board from Castle Hill returned during leg 13, when teams discovered the repercussions of their choices.
- Shane & Deb chose to use the U-Turn on Holly & Dolor.

=== Leg 5 (Queensland) ===
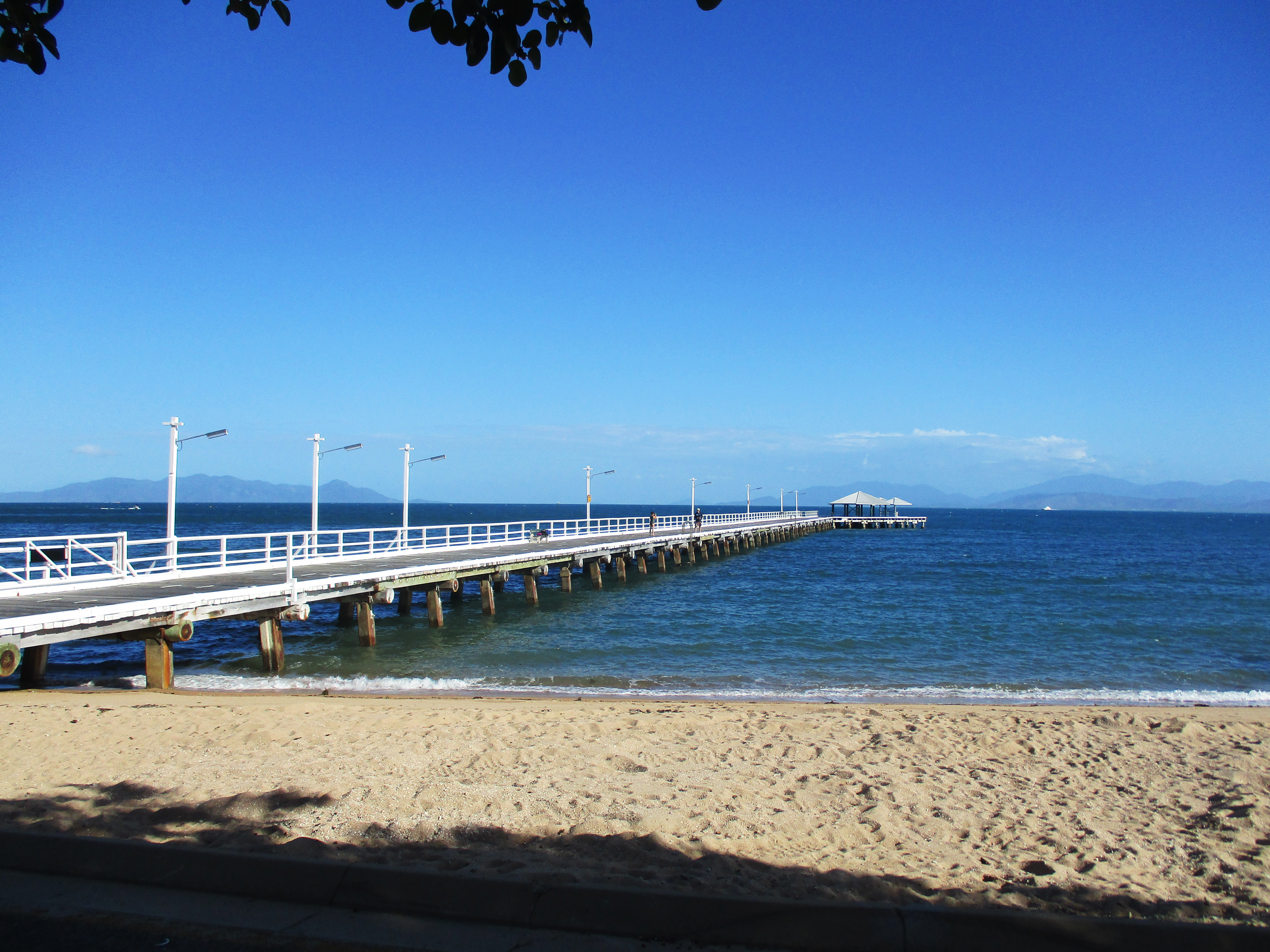
Teams finished their leg on Magnetic Island at the Picnic Bay Jetty.

- Episode 5 (8 February 2021)
- Prize: The First Class Pass, which included a luxury experience on a yacht to be enjoyed while the remaining teams competed in leg 6 (awarded to Ashleigh & Amanda)
- Medically Removed: Shane & Deb

Locations

- Palm Island → Magnetic Island (Ferry Terminal)
- Nelly Bay (Isle Hire Car Rentals)
- Horseshoe Bay (Horseshoe Bay)
- Horseshoe Bay (Bungalow Bay Koala Village)
- Nelly Bay (Scallywags Cafe)
- Horseshoe Bay (Magnetic Island Magpies Junior AFL Club) (Unaired)
- Picnic Bay (Picnic Bay)
- Picnic Bay (Picnic Bay Jetty)

Episode summary

- During the Pit Stop, all teams travelled by ferry to Magnetic Island and began the leg at the ferry terminal. Teams had to travel to Isle Hire Car Rentals in Nelly Bay, where found their next clue in a marked car, which served as their transportation for this leg.
- In this leg's first Roadblock, teams had to drive to Horseshoe Bay and find Beau. Once everyone arrived, one member of each team had to hang onto a pole above the water. Teams departed the next day based on how long racers held onto their poles.
- Teams left Bungalow Bay Koala Village the next morning and drove to Scallywags Cafe. There, teams had to eat 20 dry Weet-Bix bars to receive their next clue.
- In this leg's second Roadblock, one team member, regardless of who performed the previous Roadblock, had to learn to fire breathe and light three targets on fire to receive their next clue directing them to the Pit Stop: the Picnic Bay Jetty.

Additional notes

- Shane & Deb were medically removed from the competition at Bungalow Bay Koala Village due to Shane injuring his knee during the leg's first Roadblock at Horseshoe Bay.
- This leg featured an unaired Detour that was a choice between crab racing or bogan games.
- This was a non-elimination leg.

=== Leg 6 (Queensland) ===
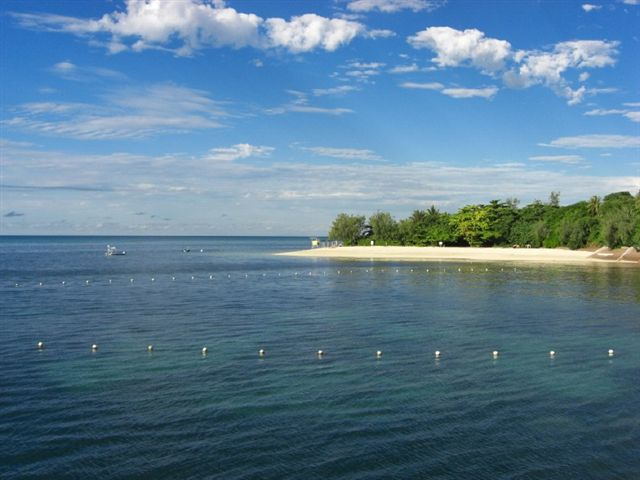
After the Detour, teams travelled to Green Island to finish the leg.

- Episode 6 (9 February 2021)
- Prize: A holiday to the Disneyland Resort in Anaheim, California, in the United States (awarded to Skye-Blue & Jake)
- Eliminated: Jobelle & Rani

Locations

- Nelly Bay (Magnetic Island Marina)
- Nelly Bay → Townsville
- Townsville → Cairns
- Cairns → Fitzroy Island
- Fitzroy Island (Great Barrier Reef or Cairns Turtle Rehabilitation Centre)
- Fitzroy Island (Fitzroy Island Jetty) → Green Island
- Green Island (Recycling Centre)
- Green Island (Sandy Crack Beach)

Episode summary

- At the start of this leg, all teams travelled together on the same ferry to Townsville and same flight to Cairns. Teams then travelled on one of two ferries to Fitzroy Island, the first of which carried five teams and the second of which carried four, where they found their next clue.
- This leg's Detour was a choice between Restoration or Rehabilitation. In Restoration, teams had to dive underwater in a Scuba-Doo and correctly count the coral on two coral trees to receive their next clue. In Rehabilitation, teams had to clean the sea turtle tank filters and feed 30 deboned squid and five fish to the turtles to receive their next clue. This Detour had a limit of five teams.
- After the Detour, teams had to sign up for one of two boats, the first of which carried five teams and the second of which carried four, to Green Island. There, teams had to use a treasure map to find five hidden bottles and arrange the words inside the bottles to form the message Take Bottles to Recycling Plant. Teams brought the bottles to the recycling plant, where they received their next clue directing them to the Pit Stop at Sandy Crack Beach.

Additional notes

- Having won the First Class Pass on the previous leg, Ashleigh & Amanda were able to skip this leg and enjoy a reward instead.
- Ashleigh & Amanda gifted the Salvage advantage to Jobelle & Rani, which allowed Jobelle & Rani to have an island guide assist them for the entirety of this leg. Likewise, Ashleigh & Amanda assigned the Sabotage penalty to Jordan & Violeta, which required that both team members wear goggles and a snorkel for the entirety of this leg, although they did have to remove their goggles and snorkels to complete the Rehabilitation Detour so as to avoid scaring the turtles.

=== Leg 7 (Queensland → Northern Territory) ===
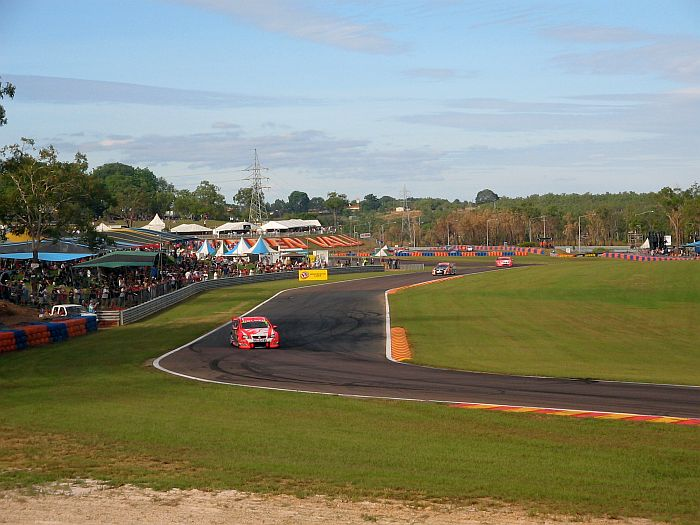
Teams rode in drift cars at the Hidden Valley Raceway while in Darwin.

- Episode 7 (14 February 2021)
- Prize: A five-night holiday to Darwin, Northern Territory, with a Top End safari camp overnight tour (awarded to Jaskirat & Anurag)
- Eliminated: Sefa & Jessica

Locations

- Cairns → Darwin, Northern Territory (Darwin International Airport)
- Darwin (Mindil Beach) (Aired in leg 8)
- Darwin (Crocodylus Park)
- Darwin (Royal Flying Doctor Service Hangar or Laksa House)
- Darwin (Girraween Lagoon)
- Darwin (Hidden Valley Raceway)

Episode summary

- During the Pit Stop, all teams flew from Cairns to Darwin, Northern Territory. Teams had to search the airport parking lot for a marked car, which contained their next clue. Teams then drove to the Crocodylus Park in Berrimah, where they had to carry a saltwater crocodile 450 metres (1,480 ft) to a new pen, measure it and then release it into a lagoon to receive their next clue.
- This leg's Detour was a choice between Treat It or Eat It. In Treat It, teams had to properly treat a patient for a burn, a head trauma and a snake bite to receive their next clue. In Eat It, teams had to properly make a bowl of laksa to receive their next clue.
- In this leg's Roadblock, one team member had to swim in a crocodile-inhabited billabong to a pontoon, grab a throwing knife, swim back to shore and then toss it into a target to receive their next clue.
- After the Detour, teams had to drive to the Hidden Valley Raceway, where both team members had to ride in a drift car and keep the water in a fishbowl from spilling to receive their next clue, which directed them to the nearby Pit Stop.

Additional notes

- MJ & Chelsea entered the competition at Darwin International Airport as stowaway teams. They had to wait five minutes after the other teams left the airport before they could begin the race.
- After the teams left the airport, they travelled to Mindil Beach, where they received a Welcome to Country saltwater ceremony from Larrakia elders and Amazing Race Australia 4 finalists Jasmin Onus and Jerome Cubillo. Although this ceremony took place during the seventh leg, it was shown as part of eighth leg.
- Drift car racer Justin Gill appeared as the Pit Stop greeter for this leg.

=== Leg 8 (Northern Territory) ===
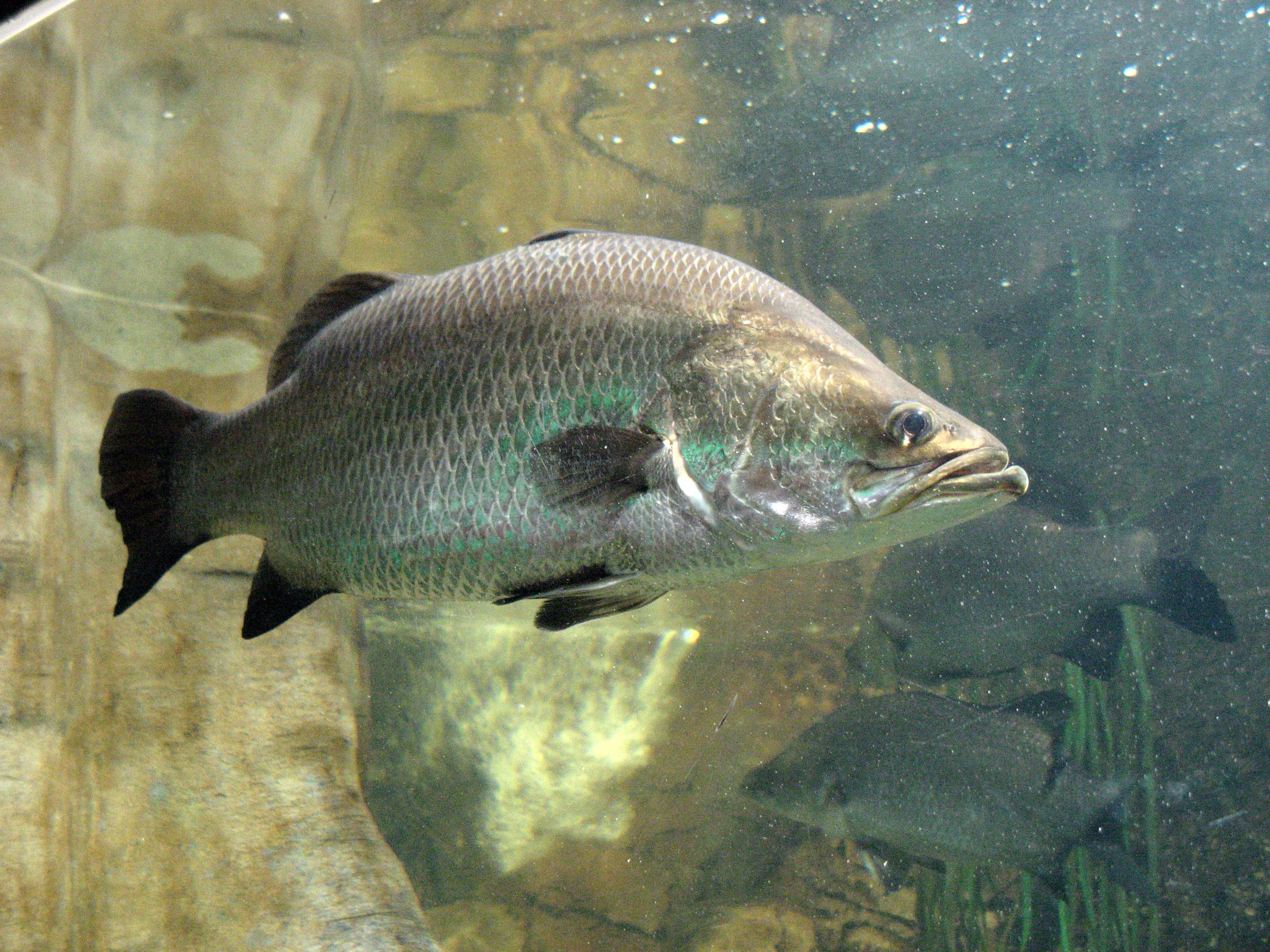
Racers had to catch barramundi by hand while in Middle Point.

- Episode 8 (15 February 2021)
- Prize: The First Class Pass, which included a helicopter ride and picnic in Alice Springs to be enjoyed while the remaining teams competed in leg 9 (awarded to MJ & Chelsea)

Locations

- Darwin (Civic Park)
- Darwin (Chung Wah Society Temple or Lazy Susan's Eating House)
- Darwin (Darwin HUET Training Centre)
- Lambells Lagoon (Pudakul Aboriginal Cultural Tours) (Unaired)
- Middle Point (Humpty Doo Barramundi Farm)
- Middle Point (Anzac Parade – Nev's Place)

Episode summary

- This leg's Detour was a choice between Stomp or Chomp. In Stomp, teams had to perform a traditional Chinese lion dance to receive their next clue. In Chomp, teams had to eat a 3.5-kilogram (7.7 lb) steamed barramundi using only chopsticks to receive their next clue.
- In this leg's Roadblock, one team member had to complete a helicopter crash training exercise by escaping from a helicopter simulator that was submerged and inverted in a pool of water while blindfolded to receive their next clue.
- Teams had to drive to the Humpty Doo Barramundi Farm, where they had to catch one barramundi by hand to receive their next clue, which directed them to the Pit Stop: Nev's Place in Middle Point.

Additional notes

- The Welcome to Country ceremony that aired as part of this episode actually took place during leg 7.
- At the Pudakul Aboriginal Cultural Tours, teams had to cut off part of a tree and strip the bark to make traditional Limilngan-Wulna clapsticks. This task was unaired in the episode, but was shown as an extra scene on the show's website.
- The 'world's loudest burper' Neville Sharp appeared as the Pit Stop greeter for this leg.
- This was a non-elimination leg.

=== Leg 9 (Northern Territory) ===
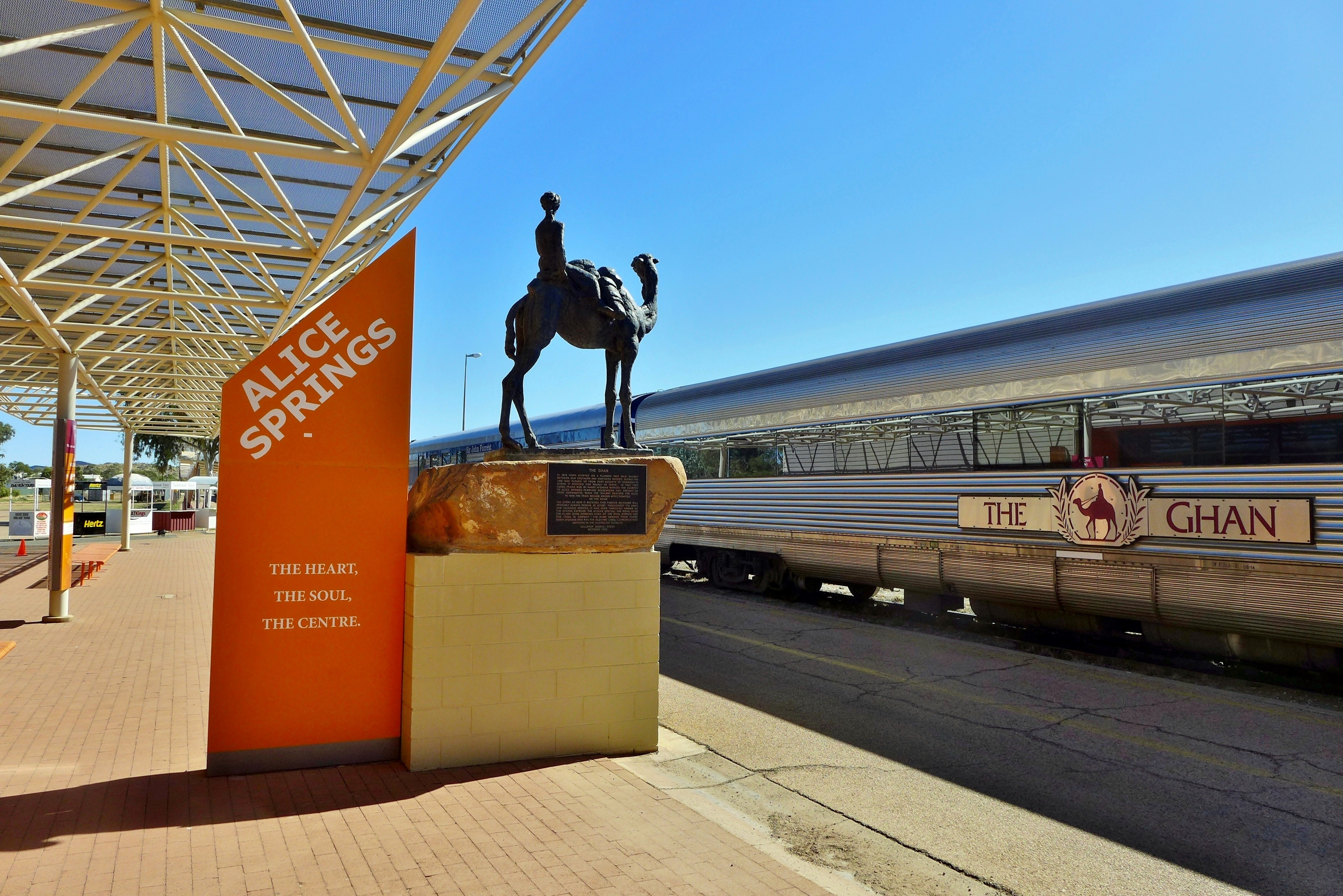
The interstate train The Ghan was the site of the Pit Stop in Alice Springs.

- Episode 9 (16 February 2021)
- Prize: A holiday to Uluru with accommodations at Sails in the Desert and a Sounds of Silence dinner (awarded to Ashleigh & Amanda)

Locations

- Darwin (Bicentennial Park)
- Darwin → Alice Springs
- Alice Springs (Alice Springs Library Bus Stop)
- Alice Springs (Outback Ballooning)
- Alice Springs (Alice Springs Library Bus Stop)
- Alice Springs (Alice Springs Telegraph Station)
- Alice Springs (Todd River)
- Alice Springs (Outback Cycling) (Unaired)
- Alice Springs (Alice Springs Skate Park or Pyndan Camel Tracks)
- Alice Springs (Alice Springs Telegraph Station) (Unaired)
- Alice Springs (Alice Springs railway station – The Ghan)

Episode summary

- At the start of this leg, teams were instructed to fly to Alice Springs. Once there, they had to travel to the Alice Springs Library bus stop, where they had to sign up for one of two buses, each carrying four teams, departing the next morning.
- In this leg's Roadblock, one team member would have had to drop coloured bombs from a hot air balloon onto three targets. Due to high wind conditions, this task was cancelled and changed to an Intersection, which required four teams to join to pack their balloon into the basket to receive their next clue. The teams were paired up thusly: Ashleigh & Amanda, Chris & Aleisha, Skye-Blue & Jake, and Holly & Dolor; and Jordan & Violeta, Brendon & Jackson, Dwes & Katherine, and Jaskirat & Anurag. After this task, teams were no longer joined.
- After the Roadblock, teams traveled by bus back to Alice Springs and then by taxi to the Alice Springs Telegraph Station. Teams then had to travel to the Todd River, where they had to complete the Henley-on-Todd Regatta by carrying a land boat around a 500-metre (1,600 ft) course while avoiding pirates to receive their next clue.
- This leg's Detour was a choice between Build or Bathe. In Build, teams had to build either a grind box, a quarter pipe or a table top ramp to receive their next clue. In Bathe, teams had to wash, dry and groom an Australian feral camel before feeding it a carrot to receive their next clue.
- Teams had to check in at the Pit Stop: The Ghan at the Alice Springs railway station.

Additional notes

- Having won the First Class Pass on the previous leg, MJ & Chelsea were able to skip this leg and enjoy a reward instead.
- MJ & Chelsea gifted the Salvage advantage to Dwes & Katherine, which allowed Dwes & Katherine to have a car and driver to chauffeur them to all of their destinations on this leg. Likewise, MJ & Chelsea assigned the Sabotage penalty to Jaskirat & Anurag, which required that both Jaskirat & Anurag carry large plush kangaroos for the entirety of this leg.
- After completing the regatta at the Todd River, teams travelled to Outback Cycling and did a task that involved digging with a shovel to propel themselves on a small cart. This task was unaired in the episode.
- After the Detour, teams had to return to the Alice Springs Telegraph Station and decipher a Morse code message that revealed the name of the Pit Stop: GHAN STATION. This task was also unaired.
- There was no elimination at the end of this leg; all teams were instead instructed to continue racing.

=== Leg 10 (Northern Territory → South Australia) ===
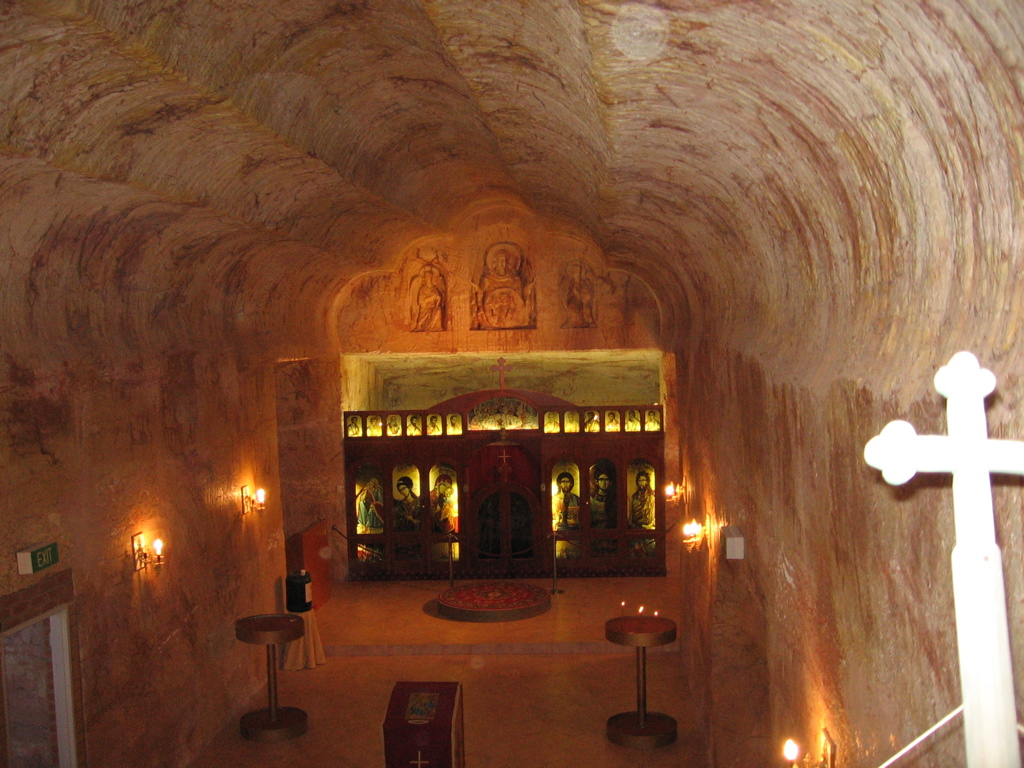
Teams had to use mirrors to reflect a laser onto an opal at Saint Elijah's Underground Church in Coober Pedy.

- Episode 10 (21 February 2021)
- Prize: A$5000 for each racer (awarded to Chris & Aleisha)
- Eliminated: Dwes & Katherine

Locations

- (The Ghan) Alice Springs → Mount Clarence Station, South Australia (Manguri Siding)
- Coober Pedy (Tom's Working Opal Mine or Old Timers Mine)
- Coober Pedy (Saint Elijah's Underground Church)
- Coober Pedy (Coober Pedy Sign)
- Coober Pedy (Coober Pedy Opal Fields Golf Club)
- Coober Pedy (Crocodile Harry's Underground Nest)

Episode summary

- On The Ghan, teams were shown a video message from Beau Ryan, informing them that they were now locked in their cabin and had to escape. The order that teams escaped determined the order that they left the train when it arrived in Mount Clarence Station, South Australia.
- This leg's Detour was a choice between Above or Below. In Above, teams had to load 100 buckets of mullock into an opal noodler to receive their next clue. In Below, teams had to descend 40 feet (12 m) into an opal mine and find an opal using only a blacklight torch before finding their own way out through a secret passage, which connected to the underground Comfort Inn hotel, where they received their next clue.
- After the Detour, teams had to drive to Saint Elijah's Underground Church, where they had two minutes to maneuver four small mirrors so as to reflect a laser beam onto a large opal to receive their next clue. If they were unsuccessful within the two minutes, they had to go to the back of the queue before they could try again.
- In this leg's Roadblock, one team member had to paint the left half of the next letter of the Coober Pedy sign yellow and the right half red to receive their next clue.
- After the Roadblock, teams drove to the Coober Pedy Opal Fields Golf Club, where one team member had to score a hole in one by hitting a golf ball into a hole held by their partner to receive their next clue. Team members could catch other teams' balls. Teams then had to check in at the Pit Stop: Crocodile Harry's Underground Nest.

Additional note

- Stan & Wayne entered the competition at Manguri Siding as stowaway teams. They had to wait until all of the other teams left the train station before they could begin the race.

=== Leg 11 (South Australia) ===
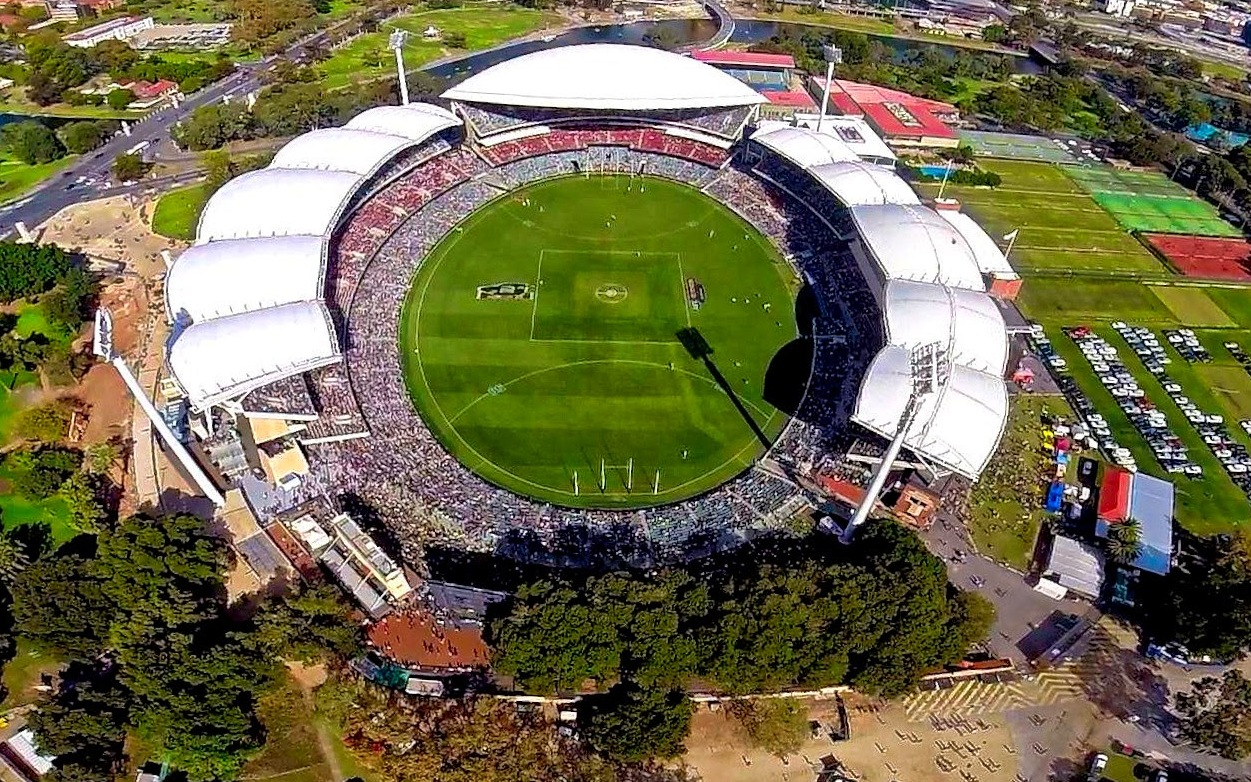
While in Adelaide, teams had to search through the seats of the Adelaide Oval for a team photograph.

- Episode 11 (22 February 2021)
- Prize: The First Class Pass, which included a spa day to be enjoyed while the remaining teams competed in leg 12 (awarded to MJ & Chelsea)

Locations

- (The Ghan) Mount Clarence Station → Adelaide (Adelaide Parklands Terminal)
- Adelaide (Adelaide Oval)
- Hahndorf (Hahndorf Inn)
- Adelaide (Amazing Grace Gospel Church)
- Adelaide (Trinity Church)

Episode summary

- During the Pit Stop, teams travelled on The Ghan to Adelaide, where they began the leg. Once there, teams had to drive to the Adelaide Oval, where one team member had to climb to the roof and use a map to direct their partner to find their team picture hidden among the stadium's 50,000 seats to find their next clue. Due to limited space on the roof, only three teams could perform this task at a time. If teams were unsuccessful after ten minutes, they had to go to the back of the queue and wait for another chance to try.
- This leg's Detour was a choice between Slap or Snag. In Slap, teams had to don Lederhosen and then correctly perform a traditional Bavarian dance to receive their next clue. In Snag, teams had to eat a German Wurstplatte of bratwurst, frankfurters and pretzels to receive their next clue.
- In this leg's Roadblock, one team member had to learn a song in Swahili and perform with the Amazing Grace Gospel Church choir to receive their next clue directing them to the Pit Stop: Trinity Church.

Additional note

- This was a non-elimination leg.

=== Leg 12 (South Australia) ===
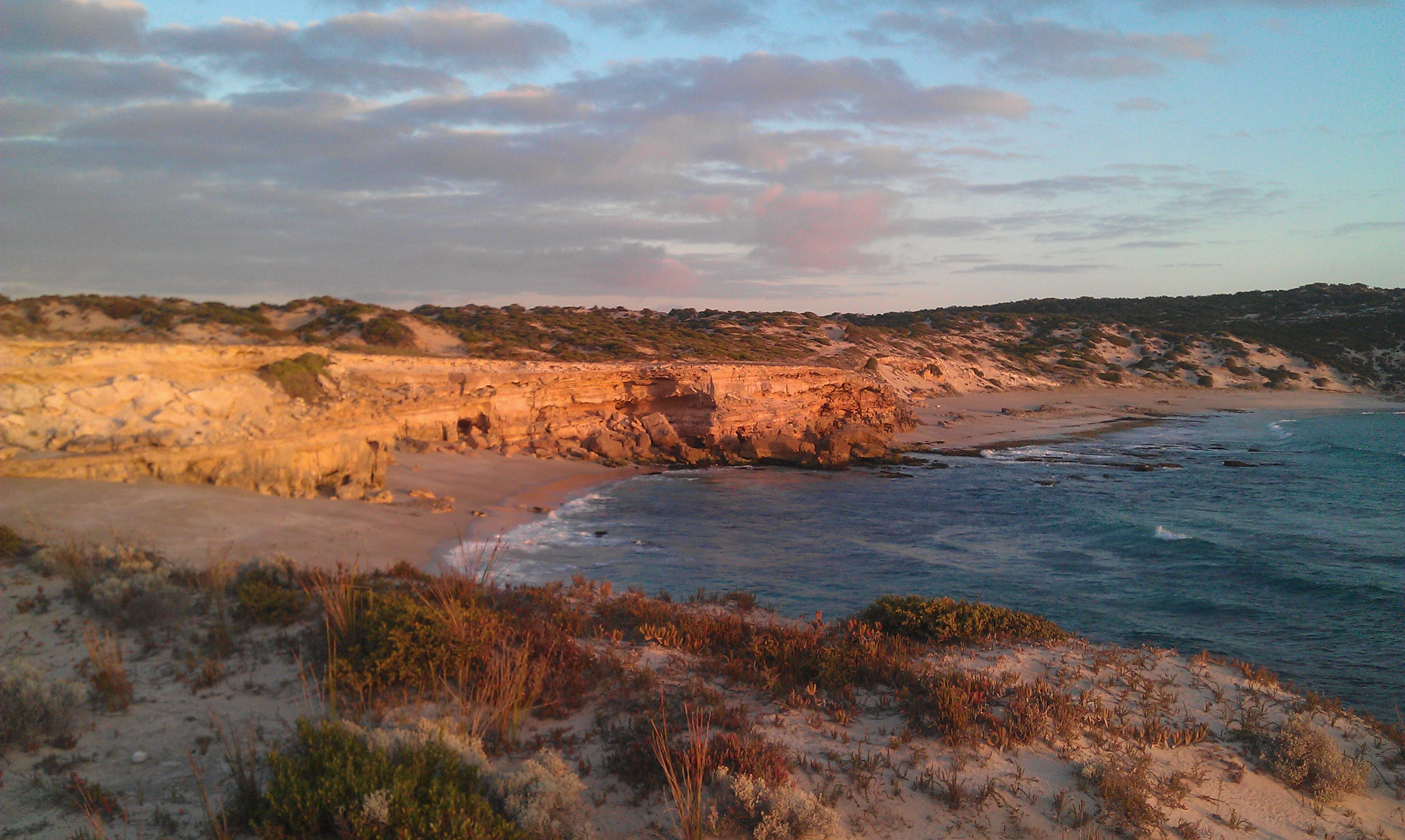
Teams finished their leg in Port Lincoln at Lincoln National Park.

- Episode 12 (23 February 2021)
- Prize: A holiday to Hayman Island with accommodations at the Daydream Island Resort (awarded to Ashleigh & Amanda)
- Eliminated: Jordan & Violeta

Locations

- Adelaide (Rundle Mall)
- Adelaide → Port Lincoln
- Port Lincoln (Port Lincoln Marina – Fishermen's Memorial)
- Port Lincoln (Port Lincoln Foreshore or Croatian Sporting Club)
- Port Lincoln (Port Lincoln Marina)
- Memory Cove Wilderness Protection Area (Hopkins Island)
- Lincoln National Park (Sleaford-Wanna Sand Dunes)
- Lincoln National Park (Boston Bay)

Episode summary

- At the start of this leg, teams were instructed to fly to Port Lincoln. Once there, teams had to travel to the Fishermen's Memorial at the Port Lincoln Marina, where they found their next clue.
- This leg's Detour was a choice between Toss or Roll. In Toss, teams had to participate in the Tunarama Tuna Toss and toss a 10-kilogram (22 lb) rubber tuna into three rings to receive their next clue. In Roll, teams had to win ten games of bocce by rolling their ball closer to a jack than their competitors to receive their next clue. Every time a team lost, both team members had to don cravattas.
- At Port Lincoln Marina, teams encountered an Intersection, which required two teams to join to complete all tasks until further notice. The teams were paired up thusly: Ashleigh & Amanda and Holly & Dolor, Chris & Aleisha and Stan & Wayne, Brendon & Jackson and Jaskirat & Anurag, and Skye-Blue & Jake and Jordan & Violeta. The joined teams had to sign up for one of two boats departing 15 minutes apart to Hopkins Island. There, teams had to attach a buoy to a rope and chain and then swim down four metres (13 ft) to attach the chain to a red and yellow anchor point to receive their next clue. At this point, teams were no longer joined.
- At the Sleaford-Wanna Sand Dunes in Lincoln National Park, one team member was blindfolded and had to plant five coloured flags into their corresponding barrels, while walking backward in gumboots and being directed through a walkie-talkie by their partner, before they could retrieve their next clue, which directed them to the Pit Stop at Boston Bay.

Additional notes

- Having won the First Class Pass on the previous leg, MJ & Chelsea were able to skip this leg and enjoy a reward instead.
- MJ & Chelsea gifted the Salvage advantage to Brendon & Jackson, which gave Brendon & Jackson access to electronic maps for the entirety of this leg. Likewise, MJ & Chelsea assigned the Sabotage penalty to Chris & Aleisha, which forbade Chris & Aleisha from asking for directions for the entirety of this leg.

=== Leg 13 (South Australia → Queensland) ===
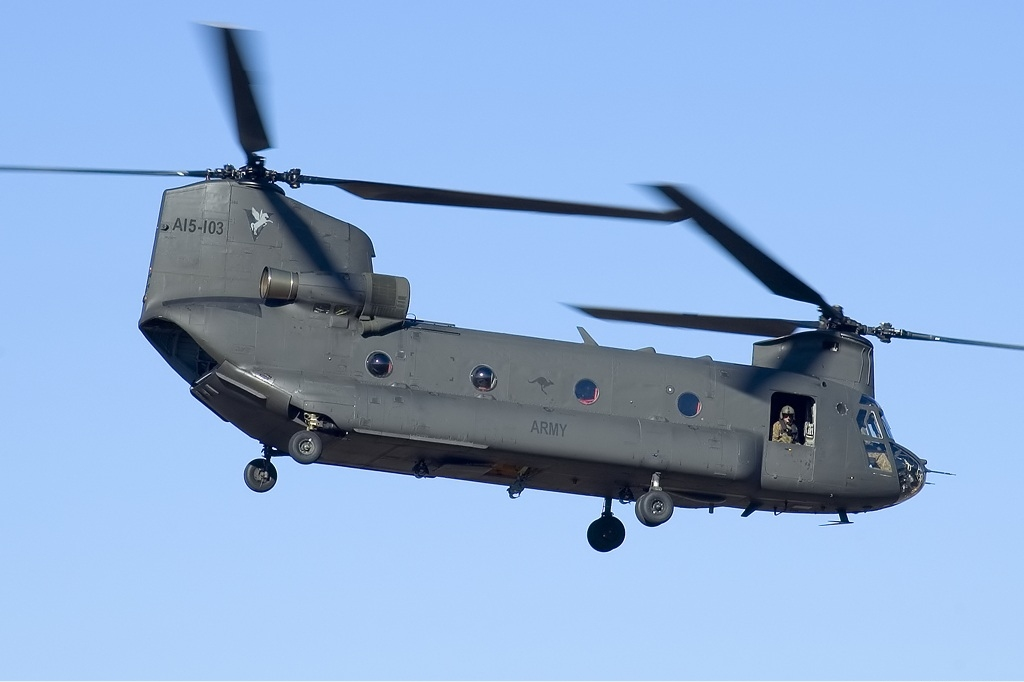
After returning to Townsville, teams flew in CH-47 Chinooks to Lavarack Barracks.

- Episode 13 (28 February 2021)
- Prize: A holiday to Fiji with accommodations at the Hilton Fiji Beach Resort and Spa (awarded to Ashleigh & Amanda)

Locations

- Port Lincoln (Port Lincoln Hotel)
- Port Lincoln → Townsville, Queensland
- Townsville (Rowes Bay – BIG4 Beachfront Holiday Park)
- Townsville (Castle Hill)
- Townsville (Jezzine Barracks → Lavarack Barracks)
- Ingham (Casa Pasta Restaurant) or Forrest Beach (Cassady's Boat Ramp)
- Ingham (Mungalla Station)

Episode summary

- At the start of this leg, teams were instructed to fly to Townsville, Queensland. Once there, teams had to find an Apollo campervan and drive to BIG4 Beachfront Holiday Park, where they had to sign up for a departure time the next morning.
- In this leg's Roadblock, the team member who did not perform the Roadblock in leg 4 had to abseil face-first 100 metres (330 ft) down Castle Hill and collect a dog tag to receive their next clue.
- In this leg's first Detour, teams had to travel to the Jezzine Barracks and travel by CH-47 Chinook helicopters to the Lavarack Barracks. Teams departed in two groups of four 20 minutes apart based on the order they arrived at the Jezzine Barracks. Teams then had to perform the Detour option they had originally selected at the BRAWN or BRAINS board in leg 4 at Castle Hill. In Brawn, teams had to complete a physically demanding obstacle course to receive their next clue. In Brains, teams had calculate the bearing and elevation of a gun turret so that a simulated artillery shot landed within 10 millimetres (0.39 in) of their target to receive their next clue.
- This leg's second Detour was a choice between Lady and the Tramp or Eat Like a Champ. In Lady and the Tramp, teams had to slurp up five metres (16 ft) of spaghetti, starting from either end of the table and slurping to the middle without breaking or biting the spaghetti, to receive their clue. In Eat Like a Champ, teams had to crack and eat three cone shell snails whole to receive their next clue.
- After the second Detour, teams had to check in at the Pit Stop: Mungalla Station in Forrest Beach.

Additional note

- MJ & Chelsea and Stan & Wayne – the stowaway teams who entered after leg 4 – could choose which team member would perform the first Roadblock challenge. Additionally, both teams faced the original BRAWN or BRAINS board that the teams had encountered in leg 4. The first stowaway team to arrive at the board could choose either Brawn or Brains, leaving the other option for the other stowaway team.
- This was a non-elimination leg.

=== Leg 14 (Queensland) ===
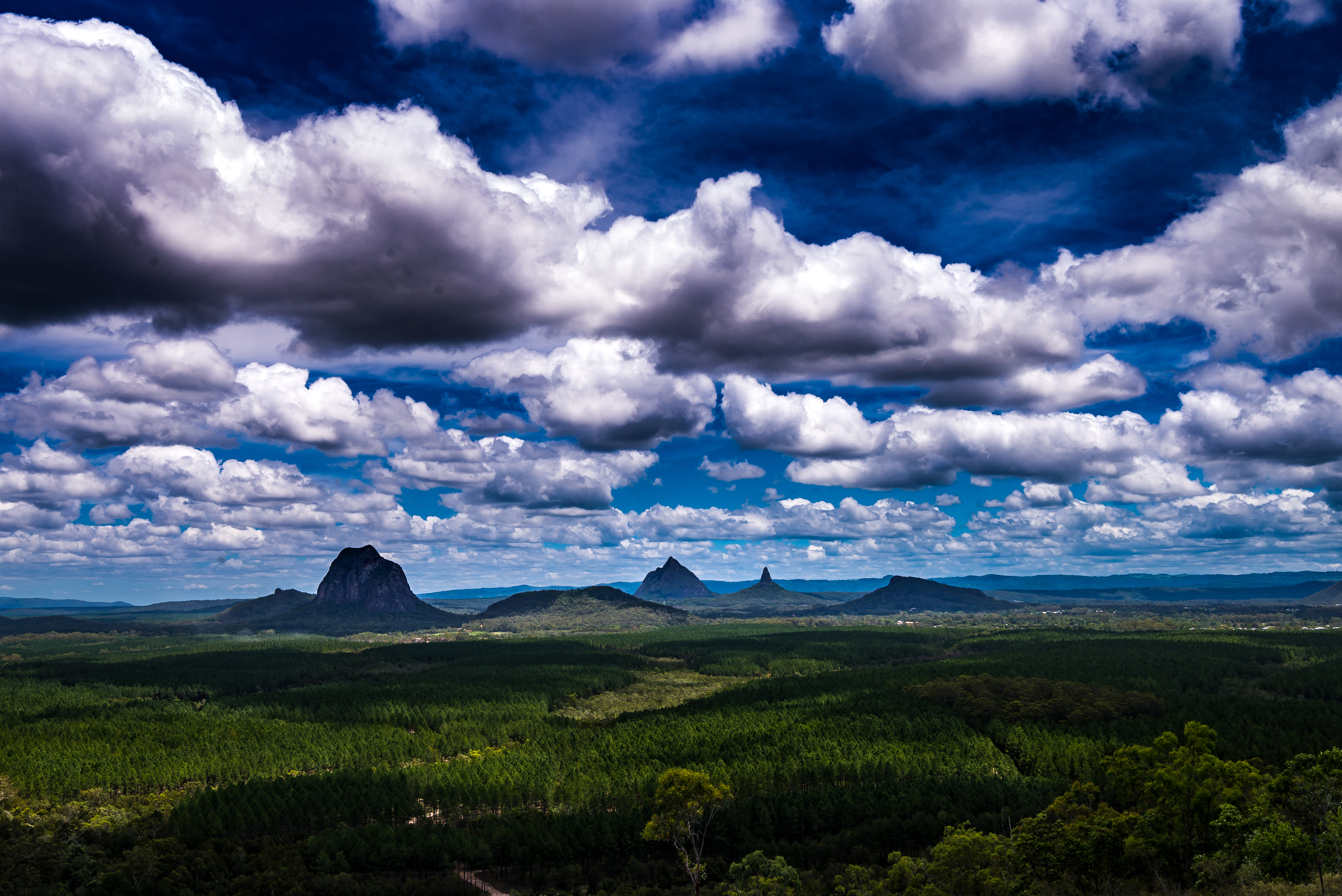
The Intersection had racers rescue their partners stranded in the Glass House Mountains.

- Episode 14 (1 March 2021)
- Prize: The First Class Pass, which included a penthouse at the Emporium Hotel in South Bank, Queensland, and massages to be enjoyed while the remaining teams competed in leg 15 (awarded to Brendon & Jackson)

Locations

- Townsville → Sunshine Coast (Sunshine Coast Airport)
- Coochin Creek (Wild Horse Mountain)
- Eumundi (Templeton Ginger Farm)
- Montville (Clock Shop or Candy Addictions)
- Maleny (Maleny Botanic Gardens and Bird World)

Episode summary

- During the Pit Stop, all teams flew from Townsville to the Sunshine Coast and began the leg at the Sunshine Coast Airport.
- At the Sunshine Coast Airport, teams encountered an Intersection, which required two teams to join to complete all tasks until further notice. The teams were paired up thusly: Brendon & Jackson and Ashleigh & Amanda, Jaskirat & Anurag and Skye-Blue & Jake, Holly & Dolor and Chris & Aleisha, and MJ & Chelsea and Stan & Wayne. The joined teams had to choose one member from each team to be stranded in the Glass House Mountains, where they had to find the highest point to find a phone that they could use to describe their location to their partners. The other team members left behind then had find the location on a topographical map before flying to their partners on the Land Rover LifeFlight special mission helicopter. Once reunited, teams received their next clue. At this point, teams were no longer joined.
- In this leg's Roadblock, one team member had pick, clean and sort a five-square-metre (54 sq ft) plot of ginger to receive their next clue.
- This leg's Detour was a choice between Cuckoo or Candy. In Cuckoo, teams had to search among hundreds of cuckoo clocks for one marked with a German flag. In Candy, teams had to stretch, roll and hand-shape four lollipops.
- After the Detour, teams found a tablet computer with a message from their loved ones, who told them the location of the Pit Stop: Maleny Botanic Gardens and Bird World.

Additional note

- This was a non-elimination leg.

=== Leg 15 (Queensland) ===
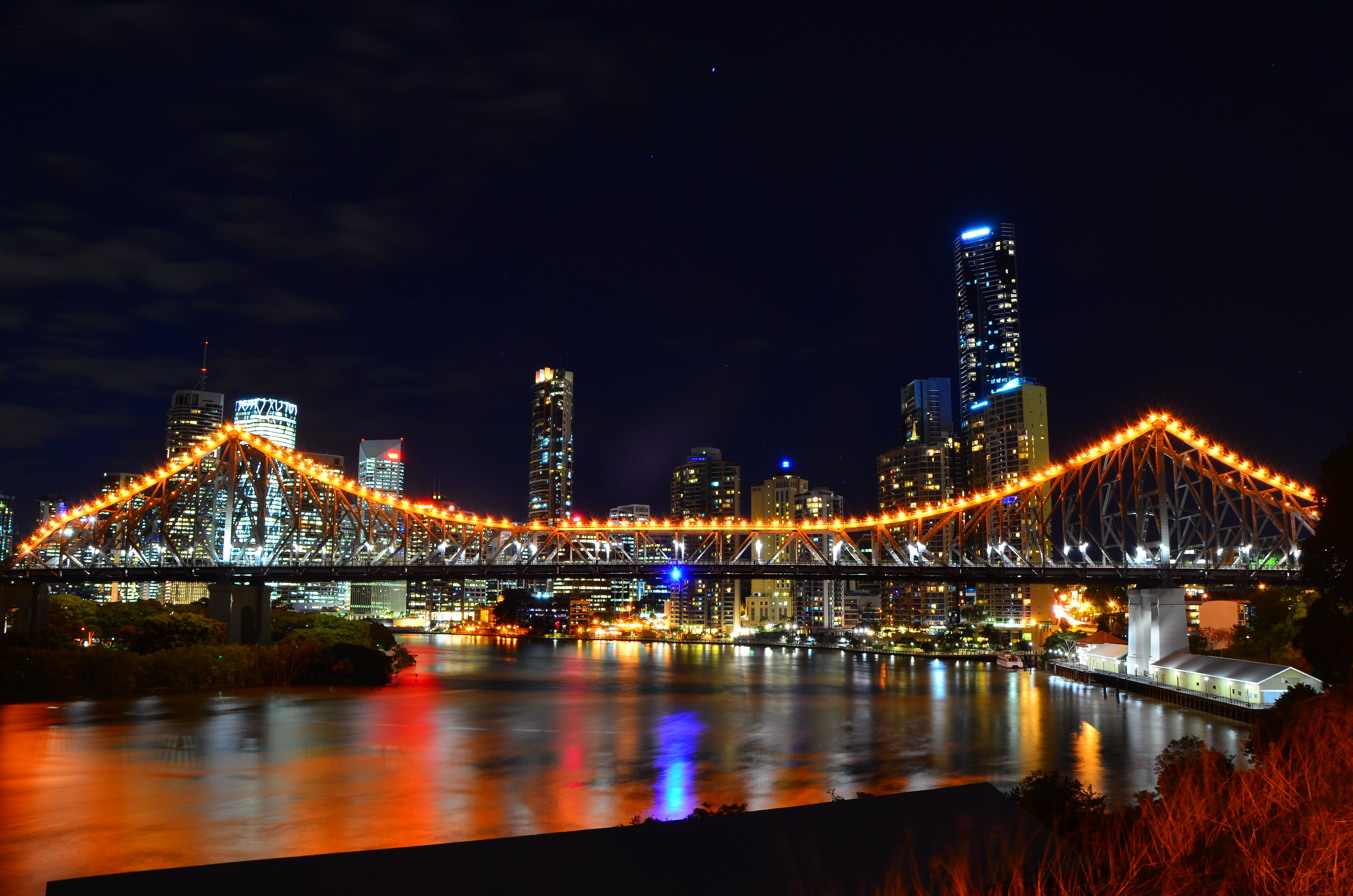
After climbing to the top of Story Bridge, teams could check in at the Pit Stop.

- Episode 15 (2 March 2021)
- Prize: A holiday on The Ghan (awarded to MJ & Chelsea)
- Eliminated: Stan & Wayne

Locations

- Palmwoods (Rick's Garage)
- Brisbane (Musgrave Park)
- Brisbane (Musgrave Park or The Greek Club)
- Brisbane (Queen Street – Subway)
- Brisbane (Wickham Park) (Unaired)
- Brisbane (Ibis Styles)
- Brisbane (Story Bridge)

Episode summary

- At the start of this leg, teams had to find a driver of a classic car at Rick's Garage, denoted by an Amazing Race flag on the back of their hat, who drove them to Musgrave Park in Brisbane, where they found their next clue.
- This leg's Detour was a choice between Cheery or Paniyiri. In Cheery, teams had to join the Brisbane All-Star Cheerleading club and perform a routine to the satisfaction of the head coach to receive their next clue. In Paniyiri, teams had to perform a traditional Greek dance to the satisfaction of the Paniyiri Greek Festival's judge to receive their next clue.
- At Subway, one team member was blindfolded and had to eat a sandwich made by their team member. The blindfolded teammate had to correctly identify all ten ingredients on the sandwich to receive their next clue.
- At the Ibis Styles hotel, teams had to use a series of keycards and a grid to unlock 14 allocated hotel rooms and turn on the lights to receive their next clue. Collectively, the lit-up rooms created an image of a smiley emoji when viewed from the exterior of the building. Teams were prohibited from using the hotel elevator after they initially reached the top floor. Teams then had to check in at the Pit Stop at Story Bridge.

Additional notes

- After the Subway task, teams had to find an Orange Sky Laundry mobile laundry in Wickham Park. There, teams had to wash clothes for the homeless to receive their next clue. This task was unaired, but was shown as an extra scene on the show's website.
- Having won the First Class Pass on the previous leg, Brendon & Jackson were able to skip this leg and enjoy a reward instead.
- Brendon & Jackson gifted the Salvage advantage to Stan & Wayne and assigned the Sabotage penalty to Chris & Aleisha. This required Chris & Aleisha to carry Stan & Wayne's bags for the entirety of this leg.
- Touch rugby player Bo de la Cruz appeared as the Pit Stop greeter for this leg.

=== Leg 16 (Queensland → Tasmania) ===
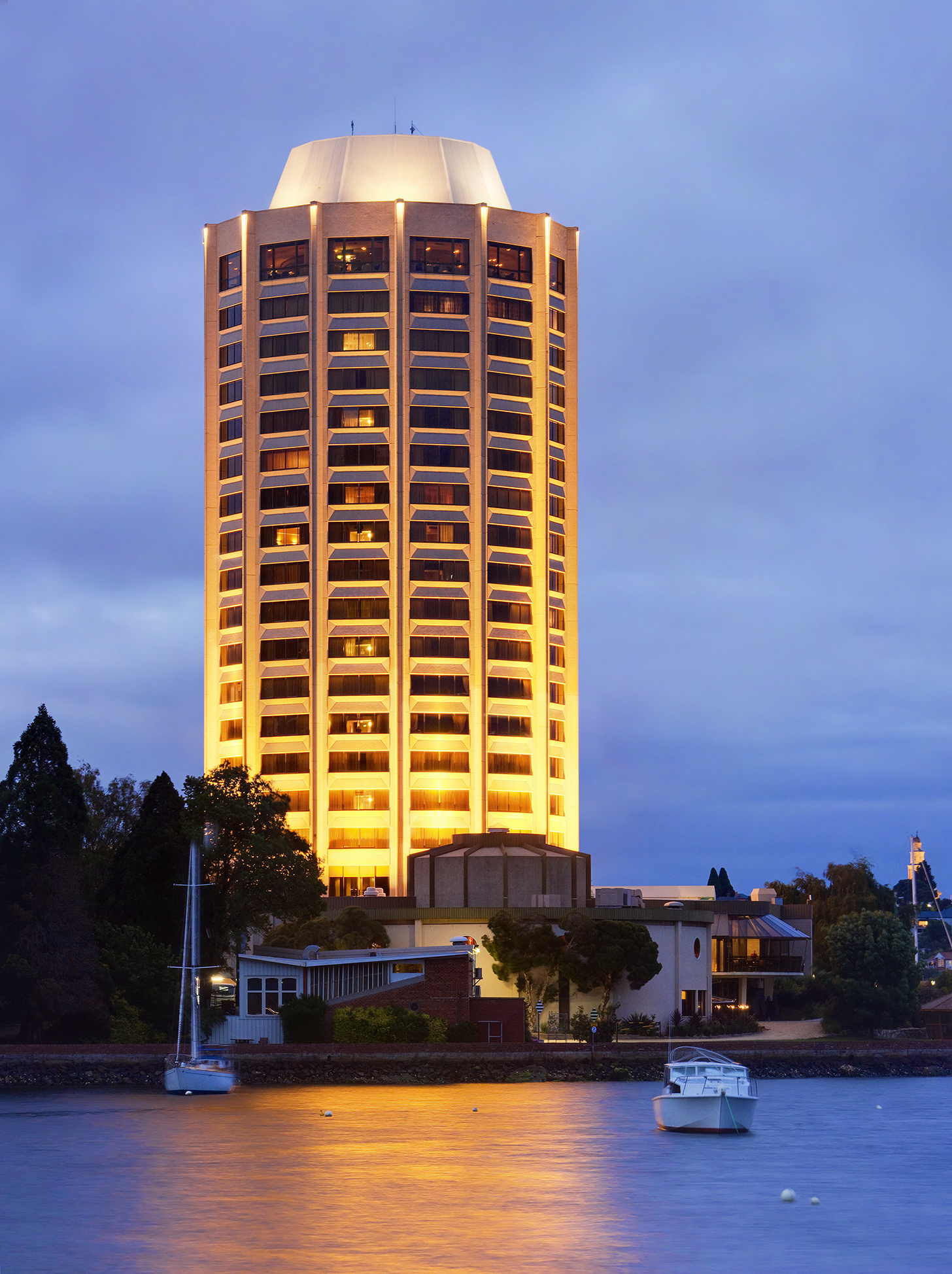
After arriving in Hobart, teams travelled to the Wrest Point Hotel Casino, Australia's first legal casino.

- Episode 16 (7 March 2021)
- Prize: A$5,000 and free Subway for a year for each racer (awarded to Skye-Blue & Jake)
- Eliminated: Holly & Dolor

Locations

- Brisbane (City Centre – Queens Gardens)
- Brisbane → Hobart, Tasmania
- Hobart (Wrest Point Hotel Casino)
- Hobart (Long Beach)
- Hobart (Shot Tower)
- Hobart (Coal River Farm or Tasmanian Cask Company)
- Hobart (Purdon & Featherstone Reserve) → River Derwent (Lady Nelson)

Episode summary

- At the start of this leg, teams were instructed to fly to Hobart, Tasmania. Once there, teams had to drive to the Wrest Point Hotel Casino, where they had to dress in 1970s-era attire and build a five-storey house of cards using all of the provided cards to receive their next clue. Teams were then strapped onto bosun's chairs and had to abseil from the roof of the casino and wash three floors of windows on their way down to receive their next clue.
- This season's only Fast Forward required one team to strip nude at Long Beach and swim to a floating pontoon in the River Derwent, much like festivalgoers at Dark Mofo. Skye-Blue & Jake won the Fast Forward.
- In this leg's Roadblock, one team member had to correctly count the number of stairs in the shot tower in Taroona and then drop a lead shot into a bucket 60 metres (200 ft) below to receive their next clue.
- This leg's Detour was a choice between Sweets or Spirits. In Sweets, teams had to lick a giant piece of white chocolate art until they could reveal the location of their next clue: a goat's farmhouse. In Spirits, teams had to rebuild a 100-litre (22 imp gal; 26 US gal) whisky barrel from scratch to receive their next clue.
- After the Detour, teams had to drive to the Purdon & Featherstone Reserve in Battery Point, where they had to paddle a kayak to the Pit Stop aboard the Lady Nelson.

Additional note

- Lady Nelson ship master Malcolm Riley appeared as the Pit Stop greeter for this leg.

=== Leg 17 (Tasmania) ===
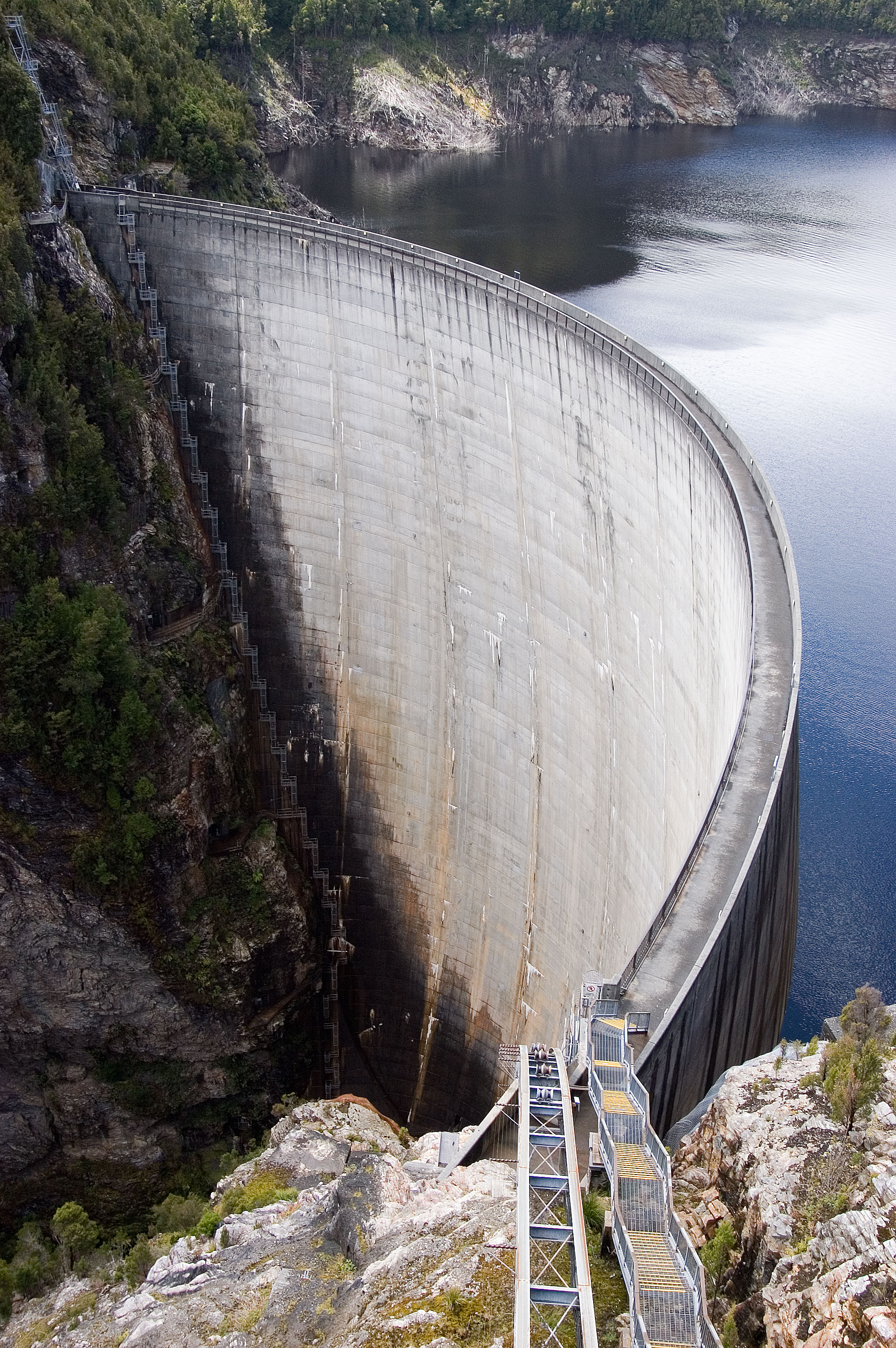
Teams had to toss balls from the Gordon Dam on this leg.

- Episode 17 (9 March 2021)
- Prize: The First Class Pass, which included golf at the Country Club Tasmania, to be enjoyed while the remaining teams competed in leg 18 (awarded to Ashleigh & Amanda)

Locations

- Southwest National Park (Lake Pedder)
- Southwest National Park (Gordon Dam)
- Westerway (Westerway Raspberry Farm)
- New Norfolk (Bush Inn)
- New Norfolk (Willow Court Asylum)

Episode summary

- At the start of this leg, teams had to travel to the Gordon Dam in Southwest National Park. There, teams had to shoot a basketball from the top of the 140-metre (460 ft) dam into an oversized net to receive their next clue, which directed them to the Westerway Raspberry Farm.
- This leg's Detour was a choice between Crush or Crunch. In Crush, teams had to fill 20 boxes with 10.5 kilograms (23 lb) of raspberry purée and then cleanly tape up the boxes to receive their next clue. In Crunch, one team member had to get into a tub of near-freezing water and work with their partner to find one apple out of a hundred with a dyed black core without using their hands to receive their next clue.
- After the Detour, teams drove to the Bush Inn in New Norfolk.
- At the Bush Inn, teams encountered an Intersection, which required two teams to join to complete all tasks until further notice. The teams were paired up thusly: Ashleigh & Amanda and Skye-Blue & Jake, MJ & Chelsea and Jaskirat & Anurag, and Chris & Aleisha and Brendon & Jackson. The joined teams had to shuck and eat 100 Tasmanian oysters to receive their next clue. At this point, teams were no longer joined.
- After the Intersection, teams had to drive to the Willow Court Asylum, where they had to use a map to navigate the dark buildings to find the Pit Stop.

Additional note

- This was a non-elimination leg.

=== Leg 18 (Tasmania) ===
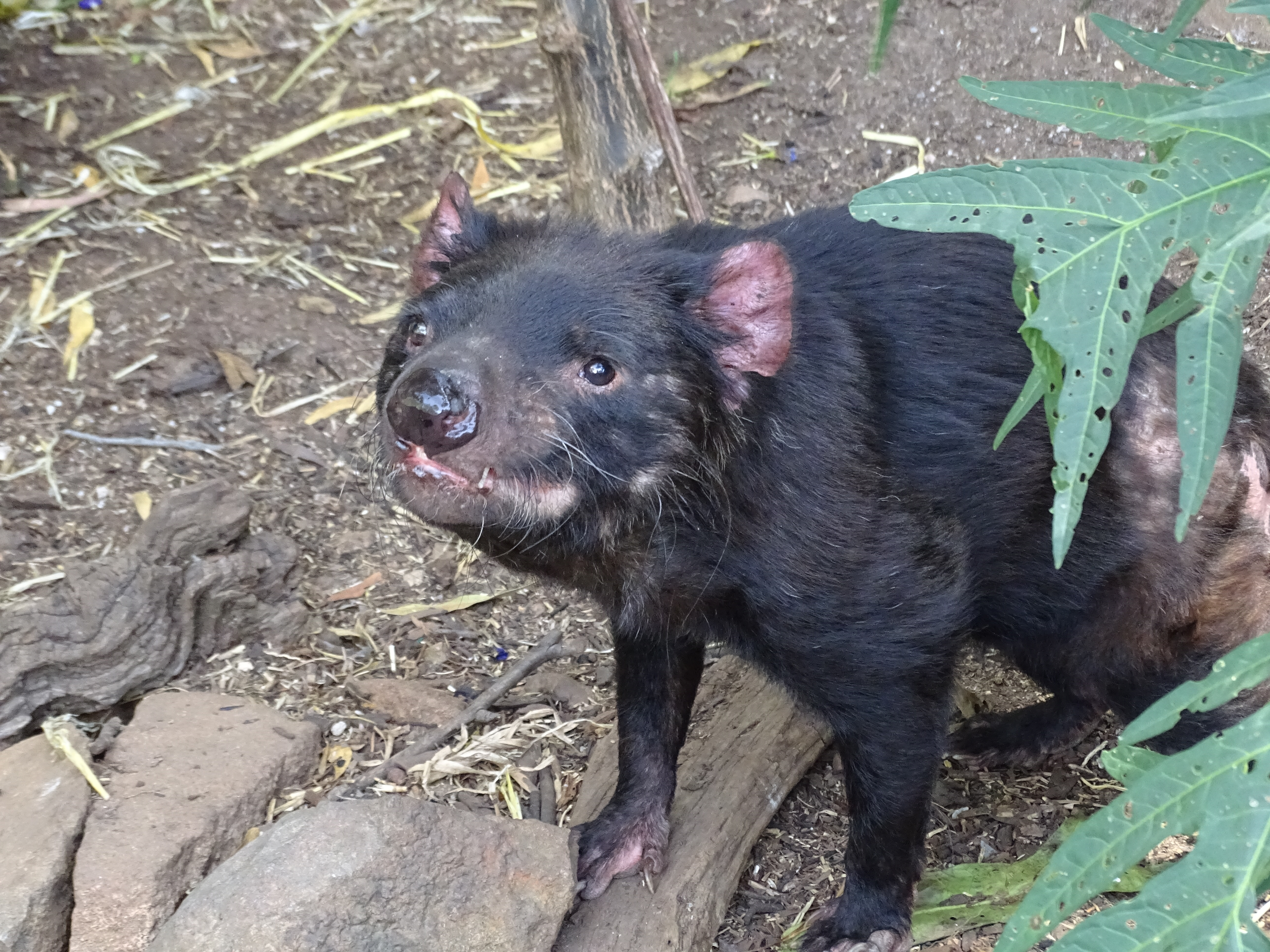
Racers got to play with Tasmanian devils while in northern Tasmania.

- Episode 18 (14 March 2021)
- Prize: A holiday to Cairns, Queensland, in a suite at the Shangri-La Hotel (awarded to Jaskirat & Anurag)
- Eliminated: MJ & Chelsea

Locations

- Hobart (Wrest Point Hotel Casino)
- Ross (Ross Uniting Church & Ross Bridge)
- Mole Creek (Trowunna Wildlife Sanctuary)
- Elizabeth Town (Ashgrove Cheese Farm)
- West Launceston (Cataract Gorge – Duck Reach Power Station)

Episode summary

- At the start of this leg, teams were instructed to drive to the Ross Uniting Church in the town of Ross. There, teams had to carry ten 10-kilogram (22 lb) sandstone bricks, no more than two at a time, to the Ross Bridge, while shackled and dressed as convicts, to receive their next clue.
- In this leg's Roadblock, one team member had to enter a Tasmanian devil enclosure and search for their next clue in a bag hanging from a tree, while dragging a piece of meat behind them along a marked route.
- After the Roadblock, teams had to travel to the Ashgrove Cheese Farm in Elizabeth Town.
- This leg's Detour was a choice between Small Cows or Big Cheese. In Small Cows, teams had to search multiple pens for four calves with black dots marked on their ear tags to receive their next clue. In Big Cheese, teams had to successfully estimate and cut 7.4 kilograms (16 lb) of cheese and carry it up a hill to be weighed to receive their next clue.
- Teams had to check in at the Pit Stop: the Duck Reach Power Station in West Launceston.

Additional notes

- Having won the First Class Pass on the previous leg, Ashleigh & Amanda were able to skip this leg and enjoy a reward instead.
- Ashleigh & Amanda gifted the Salvage advantage to Brendon & Jackson, which required Brendon & Jackson to only complete half of the requirements for each challenge on this leg. They only had to carry five bricks at the Ross Uniting Church and find two cows in the Detour. Likewise, Ashleigh & Amanda assigned the Sabotage penalty to Chris & Aleisha, which required Chris & Aleisha to travel with a helium balloon tied to their backs for the entirety of this leg. They also had to stop and replace any balloons that popped during the leg.
- Jaskirat & Anurag chose to use the U-Turn on MJ & Chelsea.

=== Leg 19 (Tasmania → New South Wales) ===
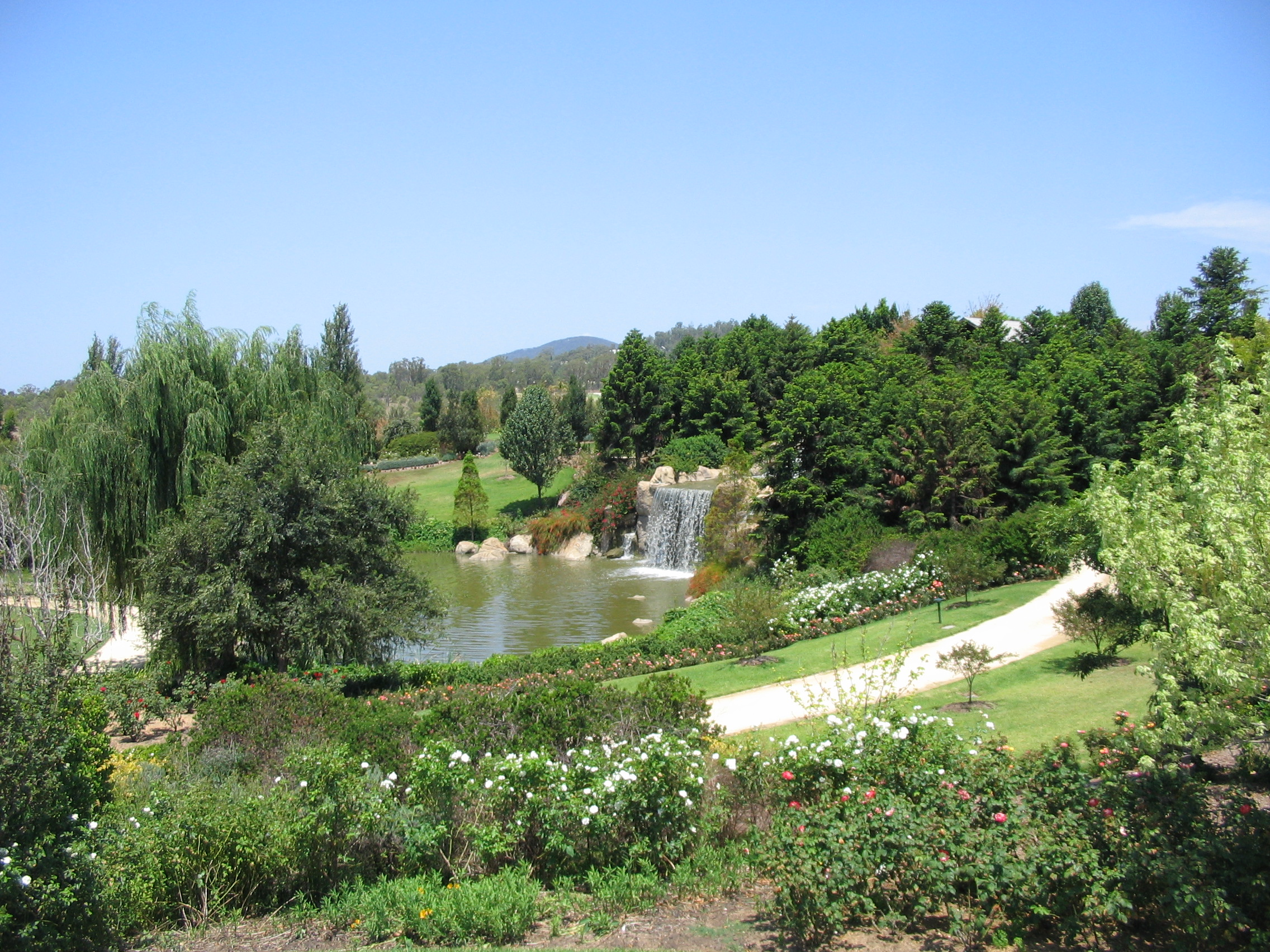
In Hunter Valley, teams found the Pit Stop at the Hunter Valley Gardens.

- Episode 19 (15 March 2021)
- Prize: A QT Sydney and QT Bondi Beach hotel package (awarded to Ashleigh & Amanda)

Locations

- Launceston (Riverbend Park)
- Launceston → Sydney
- Sydney → Newcastle (Hamilton Railway Station)
- Newcastle (Newcastle Steelworks)
- Cessnock (Byalee Stables)
- Pokolbin (Tintilla Estate Winery or RidgeView Estate Winery)
- Pokolbin (Pokolbin Farm Stay)
- Pokolbin (Hunter Valley Gardens)

Episode summary

- At the start of this leg, teams were instructed to fly to Sydney, and then travel by train to Newcastle. Once there, teams had to find the station master at the Hamilton railway station, who had their next clue. Teams then had to travel to the Newcastle Steelworks, where they had to perform a tap dance routine with the Tap Dogs to the satisfaction of tap dancer Dein Perry to receive their next clue.
- Teams then had to drive to the Byalee Stables in Cessnock, where they had to complete a synchronized dressage event called pas de deux on hobby horses to receive their next clue.
- This leg's Detour was a choice between Pit or Paddle. In Pit, teams had to cleanly remove the pits from 200 olives using only their hands to receive their next clue. In Paddle, teams had to paddle across a lake on wine barrels to a swim ring, collect grapes and then squeeze 150 millilitres (5.1 US fl oz) of grape juice into a wine glass to receive their next clue.
- After the Detour, teams had to drive to Pokolbin Farm Stay, where they had to unroll a hay bale and find a needle to receive their next clue, which directed them to the Pit Stop at the Hunter Valley Gardens.

Additional note

- This was a non-elimination leg.

=== Leg 20 (New South Wales) ===
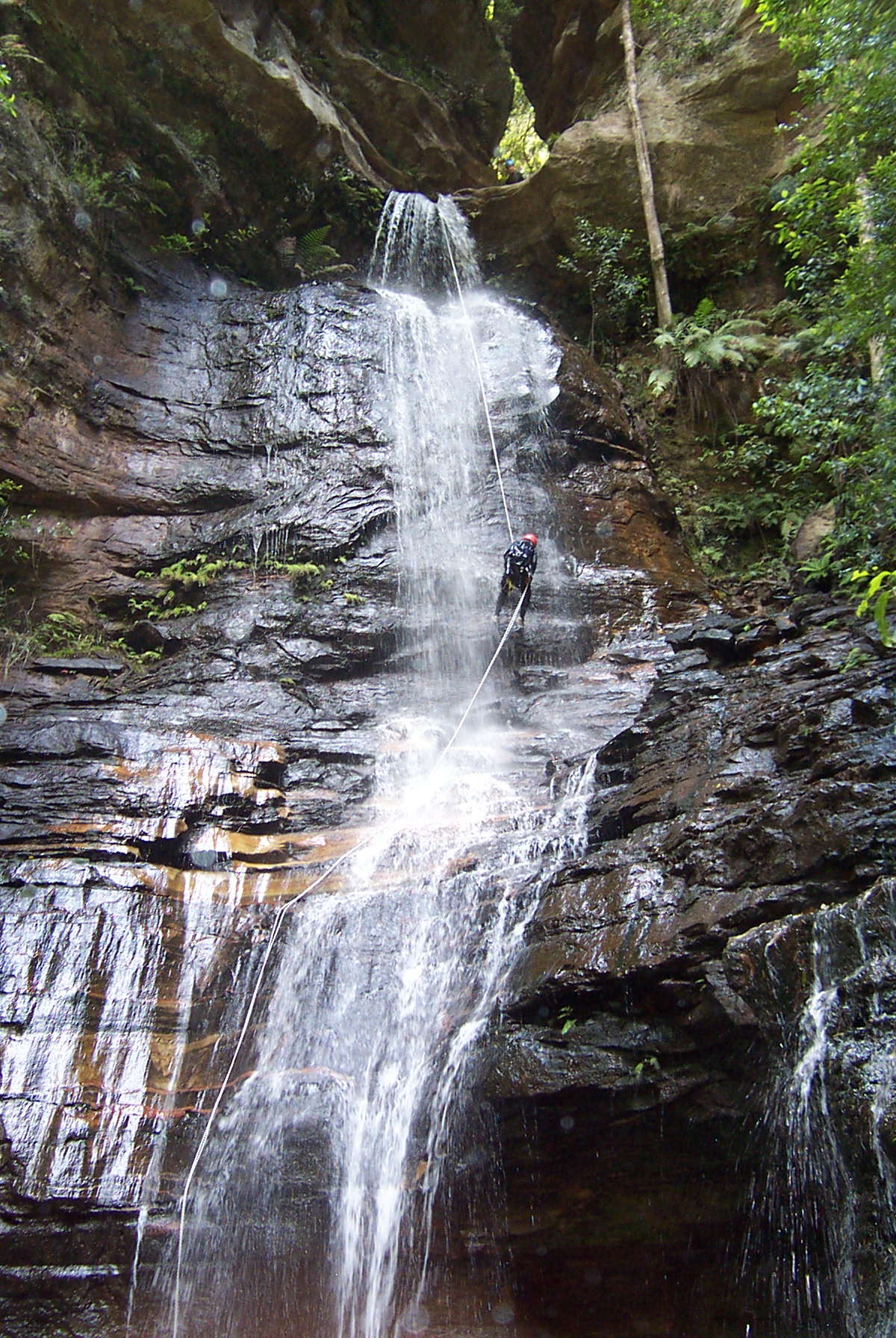
The first Roadblock in the Blue Mountains required one team member to abseil down the Empress Falls.

- Episode 20 (16 March 2021)
- Eliminated: Skye-Blue & Jake

Locations

- Blue Mountains National Park (Echo Point Lookout)
- Blue Mountains National Park (Empress Canyon)
- Medlow Bath (Hydro Majestic Hotel – The Wintergarden Restaurant or Belgravia Lawn)
- Katoomba (Carrington Town Square)
- Blackheath (Mount Boyce – Skybridge)
- Leura (Leuralla Toy and Railway Museum)
- Leura (Leuralla Amphitheatre)

Episode summary

- In this leg's first Roadblock, one team member had to follow a guide through the Empress Canyon before abseiling down the 30-metre (98 ft) Empress Falls to receive their next clue.
- This leg's Detour was a choice between Lunch or Launch. In Lunch, teams had to take an order of eight items at a high tea and serve the correct food to receive their next clue. In Launch, team members had to dress up as Bunyip Bluegum and Bill Barnacle. One team member had to launch chocolate puddings from a slingshot, and the other team member had to catch five puddings in their hats in a row to receive their next clue.
- After the Detour, teams had to drive to the Carrington Town Square, where they had to perform a hula hoop circus routine to receive their next clue.
- In this leg's second Roadblock, the team member who did not perform the previous Roadblock had to make their way across a 40-metre (130 ft) long suspended ladder bridge over an abyss at Mount Boyce without falling to receive their next clue.
- After the second Roadblock, teams had to drive to the Leuralla Toy and Railway Museum in Leura and then search for the Pit Stop at the nearby amphitheatre.

Additional note

- Mountaineer Greg Mortimer appeared as the Pit Stop greeter for this leg.

=== Leg 21 (New South Wales) ===
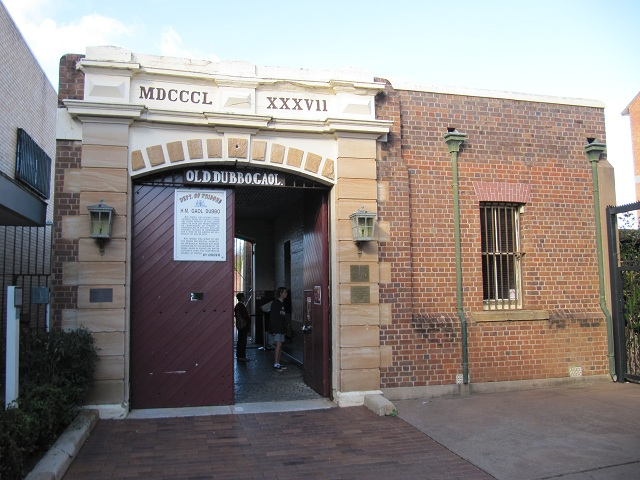
In Dubbo, teams had to escape from the Old Dubbo Gaol.

- Episode 21 (21 March 2021)
- Prize: A video call home and a 5G connection package (awarded to Brendon & Jackson)

Locations

- Sydney → Dubbo
- Dubbo (Old Dubbo Gaol)
- Kickabil (Wheat Farm)
- Gulgong (Prince of Wales Opera House)
- Tooraweenah (Emu Logic)

Episode summary

- At the start of this leg, teams were instructed to fly to Dubbo. Once there, they had to drive to the Old Dubbo Gaol, where they had to escape from a cell and climb a rope ladder over a wall without being spotted by one of the guards to retrieve their next clue.
- In this leg's Roadblock, one team member had to drive a tractor alongside a combine harvester so as to collect the wheat and then deposit it into a silo bag to receive their next clue. Only one racer could perform this task at a time. If they spilled any wheat at any point, then they had to go to the back of the queue before they could try again.
- After the Roadblock, teams had to drive to the Prince of Wales Opera House in Gulgong, where they had to perform the song "Home! Sweet Home!" on stage while in period costume to receive their next clue.
- This leg's Detour was a choice between Crack or Corral. In Crack, each team member had to crack open and eat four fresh raw eggs – quail, chicken, duck and emu – to receive their next clue. In Corral, teams had to herd ten emus into a pen using a prop to receive their next clue.
- After the Detour, teams could check in at the nearby Pit Stop on the farm.

Additional notes

- Teams were released from the Dubbo Regional Airport in the order that they finished the previous leg.
- Brendon & Jackson chose to use the U-Turn on Chris & Aleisha.
- In an unaired task, one team member had to enter a dunny and stay seated until a song finished while being in close encounter with spiders. This task was not shown in the episode but was posted as an extra scene on the show's website.
- This was a non-elimination leg.

=== Leg 22 (New South Wales) ===
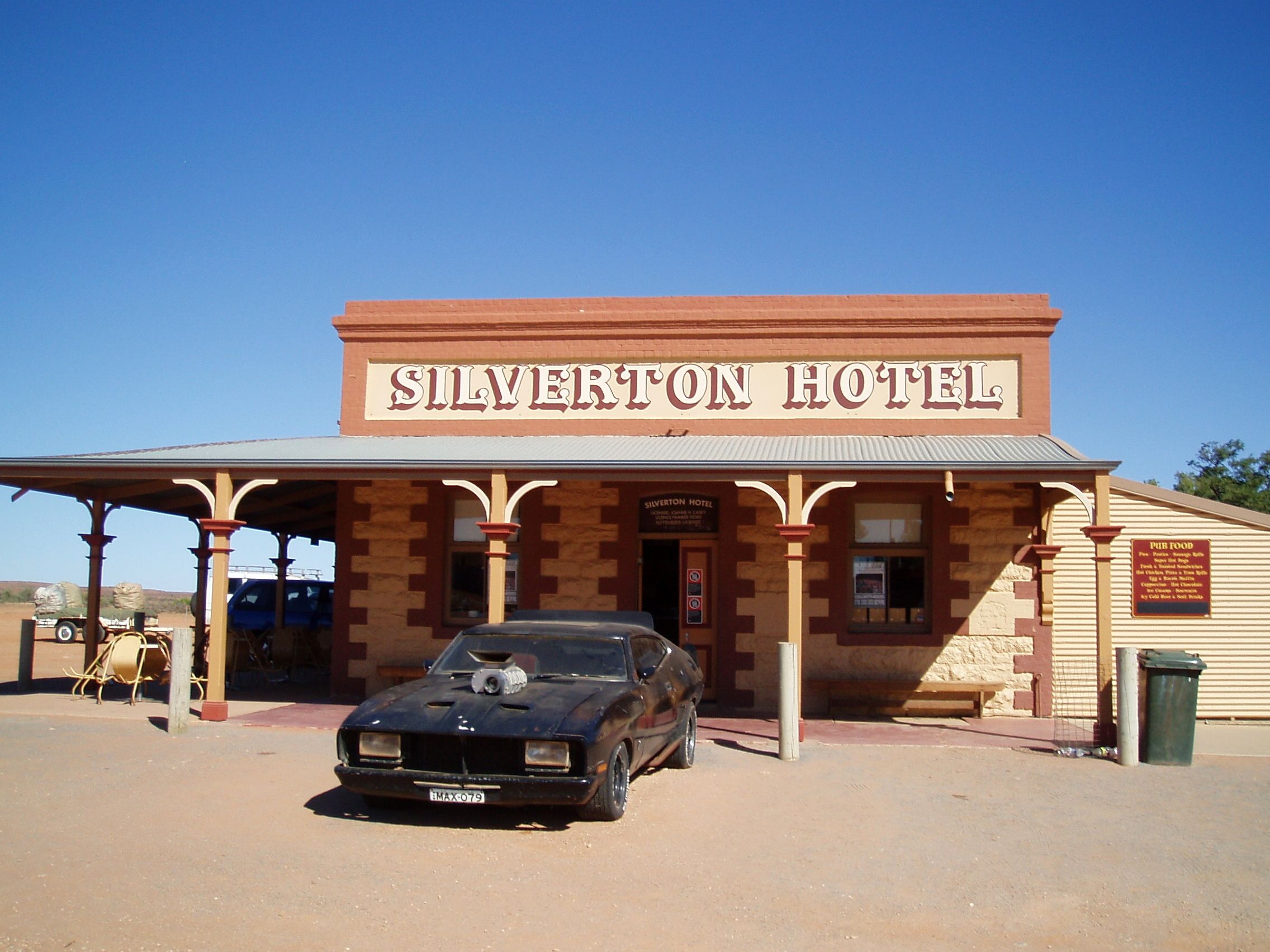
The final task in Silverton was sculling shoeys at the Silverton Hotel.

- Episode 22 (22 March 2021)
- Prize: A holiday to Cairns, Queensland, in a suite at the Shangri-La Hotel (awarded to Ashleigh & Amanda)
- Eliminated: Chris & Aleisha

Locations

- Dubbo (Dubbo Square)
- Dubbo → Broken Hill
- Broken Hill (Palace Hotel – Big Heel)
- Broken Hill (Intersections of Sulphide & Blende Streets, Cobalt & Chloride Streets, Cobalt & Sulphide Streets and Bromine & Cobalt Streets)
- Broken Hill (Big Ant)
- Broken Hill (Junction Mine)
- Silverton (John Dynon Art Gallery)
- Silverton (Silverton Hotel)
- Silverton (Mad Max 2 Museum)

Episode summary

- At the start of this leg, teams were instructed to fly to Broken Hill. Once there, teams had to travel to the Palace Hotel and then follow a series of clues to find four street intersections featuring names of chemical elements or compounds. At each intersection, teams had to collect equipment and chemicals for an elephant's toothpaste experiment. Once collected, teams performed the experiment at the Big Ant before receiving their next clue.
- In this leg's Roadblock, one team member had to fill a barrel at the end of a seesaw with grit so that it balanced the weight of their partner, who sat on the other end, to receive their next clue.
- After the Roadblock, teams drove to the John Dynon Art Gallery, where they had to correctly count the number of wheels with spokes and a rim on the pushbikes and tricycles mounted on the exterior and in the surrounding marked areas of the gallery to receive their next clue. Teams then travelled to the Silverton Hotel, where they had to scull two shoeys from a woman's high-heel boot to receive their next clue, which directed them to the Pit Stop: the Mad Max 2 Museum.

Additional note

- Mad Max Museum founder Adrian Bennett appeared as the Pit Stop greeter for this leg.

=== Leg 23 (New South Wales) ===
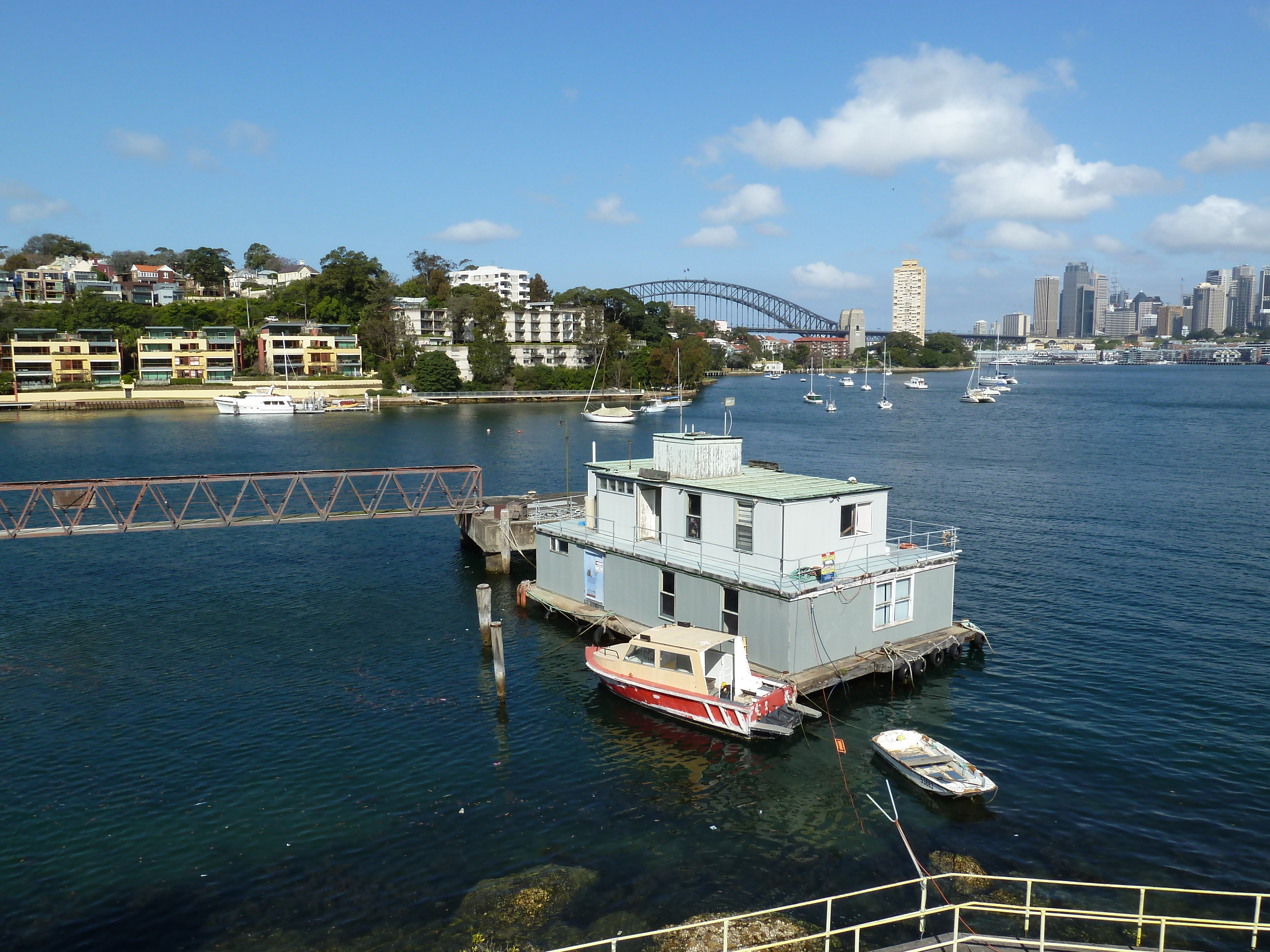
Berrys Bay Lookout, overlooking Sydney Harbour, served as the Pit Stop.

- Episode 23 (23 March 2021)
- Prize: A holiday to New Zealand, including stays at QT Auckland, QT Wellington and QT Queenstown (awarded to Brendon & Jackson)

Locations

- Broken Hill (BHP Mine)
- Broken Hill → Sydney
- Sydney (Garlo's Pies)
- Sydney (Diem Hen Restaurant)
- Sydney (MingYue Lay Temple)
- Sydney (National Centre of Indigenous Excellence)
- Sydney (Sydney Trapeze School)
- Sydney (Berrys Bay Lookout)

Episode summary

- At the start of this leg, teams were instructed to fly to Sydney. Once there, teams had to travel to Garlo's Pies, where they had to roll, fill and bake 24 meat pies to the satisfaction of manager Jackson Garlick to receive their next clue. Teams then had to travel to Diem Hen Restaurant, where they had to play lazy Susan roulette and eat six hột vịt lộn – 20-day-old fertilised duck eggs – to receive their next clue.
- This season's final Detour was a choice between Fan or Find. In Fan, teams had to perform a Han dynasty-era fan dance in the temple's courtyard to receive their next clue. In Find, teams had to shake the fortune sticks in the temple's main hall until one fell out. They then had to find the golden box that correlated to the stick's number, which contained their next clue.
- After the Detour, teams had to travel to the National Centre of Indigenous Excellence, where they had to write and perform a rap song about their time on The Amazing Race Australia based on Aboriginal rapper Majeda Beatty's style to receive their next clue.
- In this leg's Roadblock, one team member had to perform a Marvel Cinematic Universe-inspired stunt by jumping over a flame bar and free-falling 10 metres (33 ft) to receive their next clue directing them to the Pit Stop: Berrys Bay Lookout, overlooking Sydney Harbour.

Additional notes

- Original Yellow Wiggle Greg Page appeared as the Pit Stop greeter for this leg.
- This was a non-elimination leg.
- After finishing the leg in Sydney, teams slept in a suspended bed overhanging the edge of a cliff face.

=== Leg 24 (New South Wales → Australian Capital Territory → New South Wales) ===
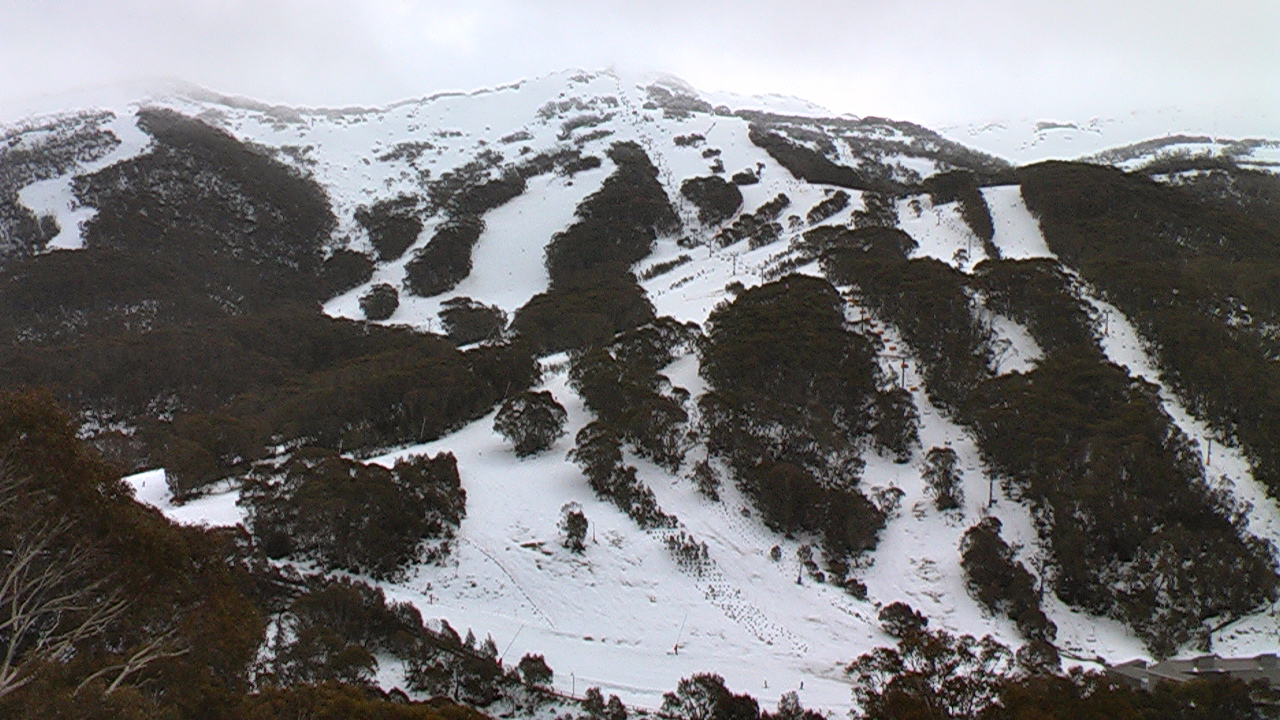
Teams finished their race across Australia atop Mount Kosciuszko, the highest point in Australia.

- Episode 24 (28 March 2021)
- Prize: A$250,000
- Winners: Brendon & Jackson
- Runners-up: Ashleigh & Amanda
- Third place: Jaskirat & Anurag

Locations

- Sydney (Carradah Park)
- Sydney → Canberra, Australian Capital Territory
- Canberra (Lake Burley Griffin)
- Canberra (Parliament House)
- Canberra (Old Parliament House) (Unaired)
- Canberra → Thredbo, New South Wales (Thredbo River)
- Thredbo (Mount Kosciuszko – Friday Flat)
- Thredbo (Mount Kosciuszko – Eagles Nest)
- Kosciuszko National Park (Mount Kosciuszko Summit)

Episode summary

- At the start of this leg, teams were instructed to fly to Canberra and make their way to Lake Burley Griffin. There, in this leg's first Roadblock, one team member had to ride a Fliteboard for ten seconds while wearing court dress to receive their next clue.
- Teams then had to travel to Parliament House, where they had to correctly assemble two giant 60-square-metre (650 sq ft) puzzles of the flag of Australia and the Australian Aboriginal flag using fabric strips to receive their next clue from Australian Capital Territory Legislative Assembly politician Tara Cheyne.
- In this season's final Roadblock, both team members had to fly via helicopter to Thredbo, New South Wales. Once there, the team member who did not perform the previous Roadblock had to board a stunt helicopter, climb down a rope ladder to retrieve their next clue, jump into the water and then swim to shore to reunite with their partner.
- After the second Roadblock, teams had to take the gondola up Mount Kosciuszko to a giant 300-metre (980 ft) slip and slide at Friday Flat, which they had to ride down while collecting six coloured flags to receive their next clue. Then, at Eagles Nest, teams had to match weird laws with the correct state or territory that they were from, collecting puzzle pieces from the eliminated teams for each correct answer. Once all puzzle pieces were collected, teams had to assemble the puzzle of an Aboriginal Australian group map to receive their final clue, which directed them to the finish line: Mount Kosciuszko Summit.

Additional note

- Inside Old Parliament House, one team member had to stand in the House of Representatives gallery and memorise an excerpt of the "Kerr's cur" speech, made by former Prime Minister Gough Whitlam. They then had to dictate the excerpt without any notes to their partner, who had to use a typewriter to perfectly type out the excerpt. Once approved, one team member had to proceed to the front steps to deliver the lines to receive their next clue. This task was unaired in the episode.

== Reception ==
=== Ratings ===
Ratings data is from OzTAM and represents the viewership from the 5 largest Australian metropolitan centres (Sydney, Melbourne, Brisbane, Perth and Adelaide).

Week	Episode	Air date	Timeslot	Overnight ratings		Consolidated ratings		Total ratings		Source
Week	Episode	Air date	Timeslot	Viewers	Rank	Viewers	Rank	Viewers	Rank	Source
1	1	1 February 2021	Monday 7:30 pm	501,000	13	95,000	5	596,000	11	
1	2	2 February 2021	Tuesday 7:30 pm	493,000	11	98,000	3	591,000	10	
1	3	3 February 2021	Wednesday 7:30 pm	447,000	15	96,000	5	543,000	14	
2	4	7 February 2021	Sunday 7:30 pm	541,000	6	74,000	4	615,000	6	
2	5	8 February 2021	Monday 7:30 pm	558,000	7	64,000	4	621,000	7	
2	6	9 February 2021	Tuesday 7:30 pm	510,000	7	63,000	6	574,000	7	
3	7	14 February 2021	Sunday 7:30 pm	564,000	4	47,000	7	611,000	4	
3	8	15 February 2021	Monday 7:30 pm	543,000	8	48,000	5	591,000	8	
3	9	16 February 2021	Tuesday 7:30 pm	555,000	9	75,000	4	630,000	7	
4	10	21 February 2021	Sunday 7:30 pm	523,000	6	49,000	5	571,000	7	
4	11	22 February 2021	Monday 7:30 pm	508,000	10	59,000	7	566,000	10	
4	12	23 February 2021	Tuesday 7:30 pm	459,000	10	100,000	2	559,000	8	
5	13	28 February 2021	Sunday 7:30 pm	464,000	8	58,000	6	522,000	8	
5	14	1 March 2021	Monday 7:30 pm	495,000	14	73,000	3	568,000	12	
5	15	2 March 2021	Tuesday 7:30 pm	479,000	11	81,000	4	560,000	10	
6	16	7 March 2021	Sunday 7:30 pm	461,000	7	79,000	4	560,000	6	
6	17	9 March 2021	Tuesday 7:30 pm	480,000	13	80,000	4	559,000	9	
7	18	14 March 2021	Sunday 7:30 pm	462,000	7	88,000	5	550,000	7	
7	19	15 March 2021	Monday 7:30 pm	491,000	13	59,000	4	550,000	12	
7	20	16 March 2021	Tuesday 7:30 pm	480,000	11	82,000	6	562,000	9	
8	21	21 March 2021	Sunday 7:30 pm	493,000	7	45,000	6	538,000	6	
8	22	22 March 2021	Monday 7:30 pm	532,000	16	51,000	5	583,000	14	
8	23	23 March 2021	Tuesday 7:30 pm	506,000	11	66,000	5	572,000	10	
9	24 (Note: The final episode was coded into two programs – "Grand Finale" and "The Finish Line". Because of this, two separate sets of ratings were produced.)	28 March 2021	Sunday 7:30 pm	618,000	7	38,000	7	656,000	6	
9	24	28 March 2021	Sunday 7:30 pm	702,000	5	49,000	5	752,000	5	

=== Critical response ===
The twist to introduce two new "stowaway" intruder teams was not received well by many viewers of the show. In response to the criticism of the stowaway twist, Beverley McGarvey stated, "In an ideal world, would we have done things a little bit differently? Absolutely."
