= List of shipwrecks in 1915 =

The list of shipwrecks in 1915 includes ships sunk, foundered, grounded, or otherwise lost during 1915.

table of contents
1915
Jan	Feb	Mar	Apr
May	Jun	Jul	Aug
Sep	Oct	Nov	Dec
Unknown date

== Unknown date ==
List of shipwrecks: Unknown date 1915
Ship	State	Description
A. T. Gifford	United States	The whaler caught fire and sank off Coats Island, Northwest Territories, Canada in September or October 1915.
Advance	United Kingdom	The auxiliary schooner was wrecked in Wreck Bay, New South Wales, Australia.
Alexander Mackenzie	United States	The US Army Corps of Engineers dredge sank while under tow off the east coast. Five crew were killed.
British Empire	United Kingdom	World War I: The cargo ship was scuttled at İzmir, Ottoman Empire.
City of Adelaide	Australia	The wreck of SS City of Adelaide at low tide on 25 September 2004. The coal storage hulk, burned out by a 1912 fire, was wrecked at Cockle Bay, Magnetic Island, Queensland, Australia, while under tow from Townsville to Magnetic Island′s Picnic Bay.
HMS Collingwood	Royal Navy	World War I: The dummy battleship was beached in the Dardanelles. Subsequently shelled and consequently scrapped due to damage sustained.
G. Thackle	United States	The motor vessel was wrecked on the southwest coast of Prince of Wales Island in the Alexander Archipelago in Southeast Alaska.
Grubstake	United States	The motor vessel was wrecked at "Cala Reef" – probably California Rock (55°18′55″N 131°36′05″W) – in Southeast Alaska.
Houston	United States	The US Army Corps of Engineers dredge capsized, probably off Galveston, Texas, in a major storm. Two crew were killed.
Kapitan Belli	Russia	The incomplete Orfey-class destroyer was driven ashore near Cape Lisiy Nos. She was later refloated and towed to Leningrad. Subsequently completed and entered service with the Soviet Navy in 1928 as Karl Liebknecht.
Leros	Germany	World War I: The cargo vessel was sunk by a British submarine while under Turkish control. Raised, repaired and returned to service.
HMS Oruba	Royal Navy	World War I: The dummy battleship was scuttled as a breakwater at Mudros, Lemnos, Greece.
Senator	United States	The 138.8-foot (42.3 m) two-masted schooner was abandoned at Sturgeon Bay, Wisconsin, due to age and her poor hull condition in either 1914 or 1915. Her wreck lies at 44°49.617′N 087°22.095′W.
SM U-26	Imperial German Navy	The Type U 23 submarine was lost in the Baltic Sea in September or October 1915.
SM UB-3	Imperial German Navy	The Type UB 1 submarine sank in the Gulf of Izmir on or after 23 May.
SM UC-9	Imperial German Navy	The Type UC I submarine was lost on patrol between 20 October and 12 November with the loss of all fourteen crew.
