= Cockle Bay (Queensland) =

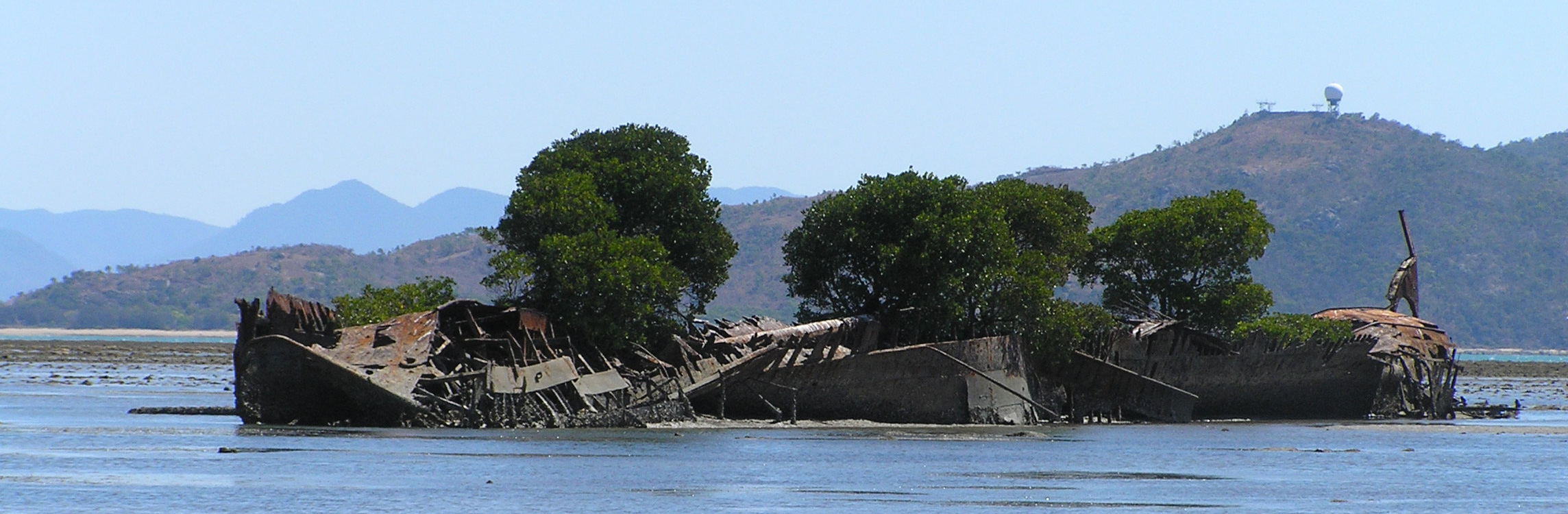
- The wreck of SS City of Adelaide in Cockle Bay at low tide
- Country: Australia
- State: Queensland
- City: Magnetic Island
- LGA: City of Townsville

Government
  - State electorate: Townsville
  - Federal division: Herbert

Cockle Bay is a small bay within the locality of Picnic Bay on south-western corner of Magnetic Island, City of Townsville, Queensland, Australia.

== Geography ==
Cockle Bay lies on the western side of Nobby Head, a headland which juts out at the southernmost end of the island. The bay is populated with a number of small residential premises. Access to the bay is gained via an unsealed road which leads through the mangrove flats to the north of Cockle Bay to West Point Road, which in-turn connects to Picnic Bay and West Point. Access to the bay can also be gained by boat, and a channel through the offshore reefs is provided for access by boats with a larger draft.

== History ==
Most notably, approximately 300 meters (330 yards) offshore in Cockle Bay at 19.174842°S 146.825471°E is the site of the wreck of SS City of Adelaide, a fire-damaged former passenger steamer and coal storage hulk which was wrecked in the bay in 1915 while under tow from Townsville to Picnic Bay for scuttling as a breakwater. On 24 December 1971, Cyclone Althea struck the area, causing the partial collapse of part of the wreck's iron hull, but the wreck has become an artificial island hosting a variety of plant and bird life.
