= Picnic Bay State School =

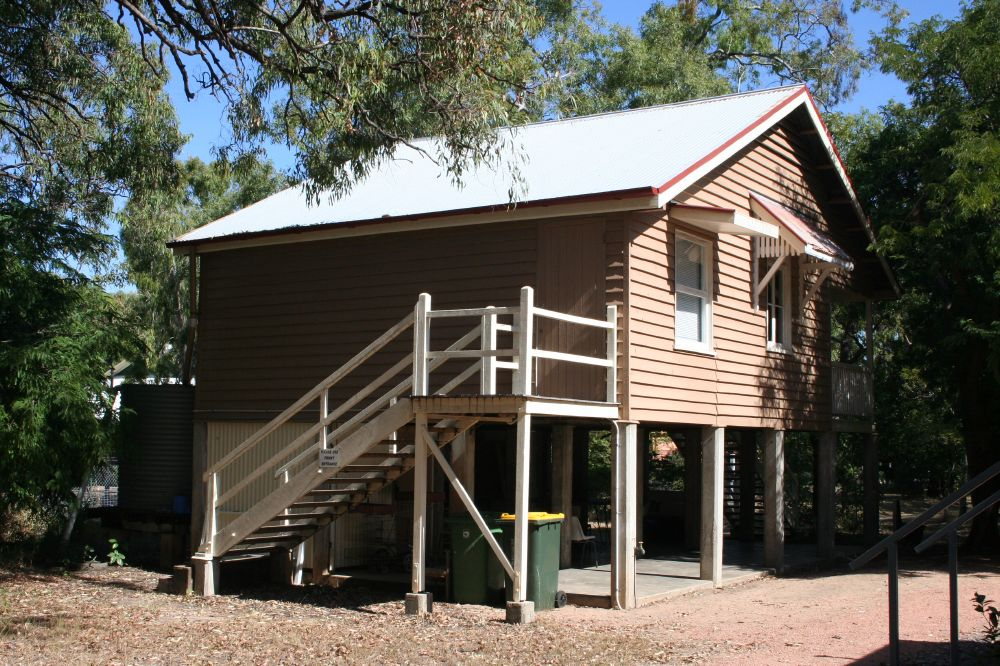
- Picnic Bay State School building, 2009

- Location within Queensland Location within Australia
- 19.177°S 146.8395°E
- Location: 11–15 Granite Street, Picnic Bay, City of Townsville, Queensland, Australia

History
- Design period: 1919–1930s (interwar period)
- Built: 1921

Site notes
- Architect: Queensland Department of Public Works
- Architectural style: Classicism

Queensland Heritage Register
- Official name: Magnetic Island Craft Shop, Magnetic Island State School No. 1567, Picnic Bay State School
- Type: state heritage (built)
- Designated: 4 June 1996
- Reference no.: 601252
- Significant period: 1920s (historical)
- Significant components: trough – drinking, school/school room, hand basin/s

Picnic Bay State School is a heritage-listed former school and now the Magnetic Island Museum at 11–15 Granite Street, Picnic Bay, City of Townsville, Queensland, Australia. It was designed by Queensland Department of Public Works and built in 1921. It is also known as Magnetic Island State School No. 1567 and Magnetic Island Craft Shop. It was added to the Queensland Heritage Register on 4 June 1996.

== History ==
The Magnetic Island State School was constructed in 1921, probably by local builder Mr Shrock, and replaced an earlier provisional school building erected in 1913.

The island was first settled by the Butler family in 1877. Harry Butler and his family established a small dairy, orchard and a mixed farm in Picnic Bay. The family experimented with the planting of pineapples and after building small huts adjacent to their house the island became a favourite weekend and holiday destination for mainland people. They also established a ferry service which operated well into the 20th century. Other settlers had established farms in accessible bays round the island by the early 1900s. Vegetables, pineapples and fruit were grown for sale on the mainland.

Tourist development of the island began in earnest when Robert Hayles built an hotel at Picnic Bay in 1901. The island's reputation as a holiday resort brought many settlers to the various bays where guest houses and holiday huts were established. Tourism has continued to be the chief source of livelihood for many people residing on Magnetic Island.

With the early 20th century expansion of settlement on Magnetic Island came the need for the provision of local education. Although free, secular, compulsory education had been introduced to Queensland with the Education Act 1875, school fees and contributions to school building funds still had to be met by parents, and compulsory attendance was rarely enforced prior to 1900. Magnetic Island children who did receive an education during this period generally boarded on the mainland and attended the Townsville schools.

Educational reform was slow in coming to Queensland as a result of the financial constraints placed on the Government by depression and subsequent drought during the latter part of the 19th century. Change began after the Education Act Amendment Act 1912 abolished the need for local people to contribute to their children's education, raised the minimum leaving age from 12 to 14 years and reinforced compulsory primary school attendance. These regulations imposed considerable hardship on Magnetic Island families because the children were obliged to go to school on the mainland. They were forced to board with friends because schools in the town did not provide boarding facilities. The lack of education facilities on the island had become a serious problem which was exacerbated as the population grew.

In November 1912 a group of Magnetic Island residents, including Dodd S Clarke, editor of the Townsville Daily Bulletin, formed a committee to pursue the establishment of a provisional school on the island. The District Inspector of Schools visited Picnic Bay and recommended that a half-time school be established, with a teacher from the mainland appointed to operate the school from 3.30pm to 5pm on Thursdays and all day Friday and Saturday. In April 1913 the Department of Public Instruction agreed that if the parents could arrange accommodation for the school and the visiting teacher, approval would be given for the establishment of a half-time school at Picnic Bay. Mary McLennan, the first teacher appointed to the island, commenced work on 12 June 1913, in an open-sided shed with a concrete floor. The half-time school became a provisional school in 1915 and on 1 June 1920 was formally taken over by the Department of Public Instruction as a state school.

In 1921 the Magnetic Island community campaigned for a new school building. Pressure was also placed on the Department of Public Instruction by the Townsville City Council, who stressed the need for new accommodation for the 27 students at the school. In response, a new, one-roomed school house was built in 1921. Constructed to a Department of Works design, the new school, with open verandahs front and back, cost £785. The earlier school building became the play shed.

In November 1924 the Department of Public Instruction suggested a name change from Magnetic Island State School to Picnic Bay State School because there was now another school on the Island. The school committee accepted the name change in January 1925. In October 1927 the Picnic Bay Progress Association applied to rent half the school grounds for a sports field. The Department refused but agreed that the school grounds outside the fenced school building could be used for recreation purposes.

The school committee led an active campaign in the 1930s to have a well sunk and a windmill erected on the school reserve. They succeeded and the well and windmill were constructed in 1937. The south end of the front verandah was enclosed in September 1939 to create a hat room and the play shed was demolished in July–August 1940. Electricity was connected at the end of 1955 and the rear verandah was enclosed during September and October 1958 to create more classroom space.

By the 1960s there were three schools on Magnetic Island. In rationalising its assets at this period, the Education Department decided to phase out the schools at Picnic and Horseshoe Bays, and to develop the school at Nelly Bay because of its central location on the island. The Picnic Bay State School functioned until May 1970. The building remained vacant until occupied in 1980 by the newly established Magnetic Island Craft Co-Operative, which conducted a shop from the building. Later it became the Magnetic Island Museum.

== Description ==
The building consists of one room with a front verandah and an enclosed rear verandah. Timber and iron decorative window hoods protect all the windows. The roof has been replaced with corrugated iron although original gutters are intact.

The exterior of the building is clad with 14-centimetre (5.5 in) chamferboard. It is high set on concrete stumps with centrally placed front steps leading to a partially open front verandah. The exposed framing is a feature of the front verandah with the right end wall and part of the front enclosed with weatherboard. The remainder of the verandah has simple broomstick balustrading. The original front door remains in situ. It is a heavy timber panelled door which retains its original latch.

The size of the central room is 6.8 by 6.7 metres (22 ft × 22 ft). The timber floor boards throughout the building are 8.5 centimetres (3.3 in) wide as are the walls and ceiling boards. The ceiling in the original room is flat and slopes away to the front and rear to meet the walls. Ventilation is provided in the ceiling by a centrally placed latticed vent and by means of moveable floor vents situated at the base of the front wall. Cross ventilation is provided by casement windows on the north and south walls. Each pair of casements has a three paned hopper above, which can be opened. Fittings on the windows on the southern wall are original.

Access to the enclosed rear verandah is through a wide archway cut in the rear wall of the central room. The interior walls of the back verandah have been lined with fibro and hopper windows installed in the north and south walls. The tongue and groove ceilings on both verandahs slope down in line with the fall of the main ceiling. The original back door, constructed of tongue and groove boards retains some of its early fittings. The rear steps appear original and lead to a small landing.

The remains of two tank stands are located outside the building on the southern wall and the original drinking trough and hand basin are in their original position under the building. A more modern toilet block has been constructed under the rear of the building. The grounds contain plantings of introduced trees such as tamarind and frangipanni. The reserve is dotted with gum trees, a Norfolk Island pine and some Burdekin plums. The grounds are enclosed with cyclone wire fencing.

== Heritage listing ==
The former Picnic Bay State School was listed on the Queensland Heritage Register on 4 June 1996 having satisfied the following criteria.

The place is important in demonstrating the evolution or pattern of Queensland's history.

The former school is significant for its relationship to a period of early tourism and settlement on Magnetic Island and to a growth in public concern for education, in the first few decades of the 20th century.

The place is important in demonstrating the principal characteristics of a particular class of cultural places.

The building is significant also as a regional example of a one-roomed school structure, typical of the period (1920s), in remote areas of Queensland.
