= Cyclone Althea =

1971 natural disaster in Australia

Severe Tropical Cyclone Althea
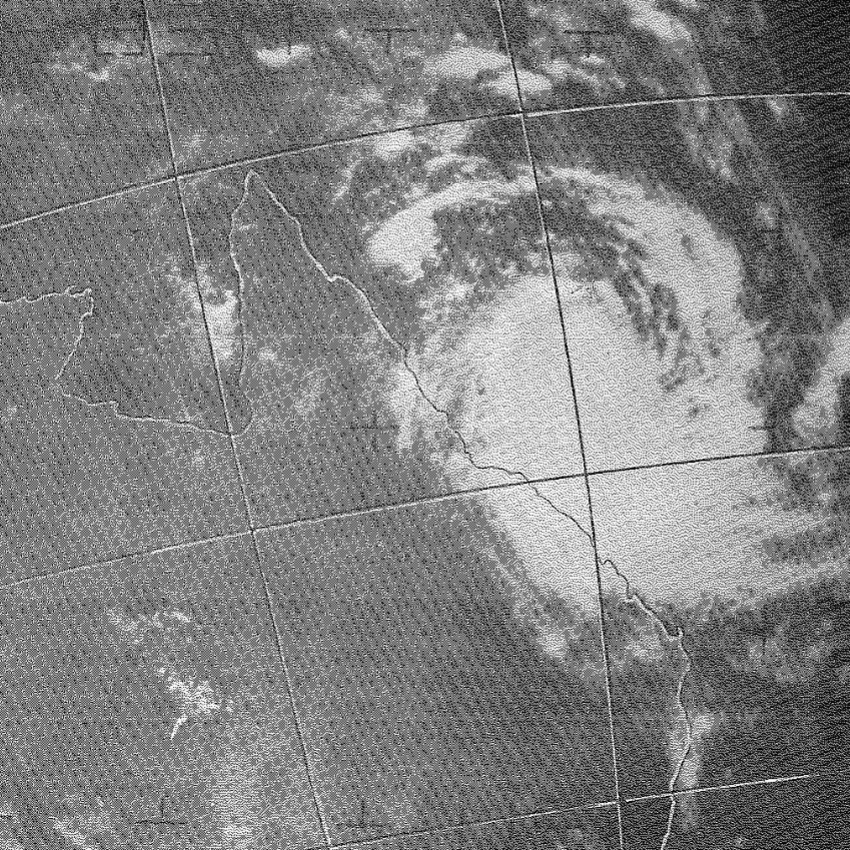
- Satellite image of Cyclone Althea on 23 December

Meteorological history
- Formed: 19 December 1971
- Dissipated: 29 December 1971

Category 4 severe tropical cyclone
- 10-minute sustained (BOM)
- Highest winds: 165 km/h (105 mph)
- Lowest pressure: 952 hPa (mbar); 28.11 inHg

Overall effects
- Fatalities: 2 direct, 1 indirect
- Damage: A$120 million
- Areas affected: Queensland
- IBTrACS
- Part of the 1971–72 Australian region cyclone season

Severe Tropical Cyclone Althea was a powerful tropical cyclone that devastated parts of North Queensland just before Christmas 1971. One of the strongest storms ever to affect the Townsville area, Althea was the fourth system and second severe tropical cyclone of the 1971–72 Australian region cyclone season. After forming near the Solomon Islands on 19 December and heading southwest across the Coral Sea, the storm reached its peak intensity with 10-minute average maximum sustained winds of 130 km/h (80 mph) – Category 3 on the Australian cyclone scale. At 09:00 AEST on Christmas Eve, Althea struck the coast of Queensland near Rollingstone, about 50 km (30 mi) north of Townsville. Although early weather satellites provided only occasional glimpses into the cyclone's formative stages, its landfall was monitored closely by land-based radar that depicted an ongoing eyewall replacement cycle. Althea produced copious rainfall over central and western Queensland as it turned toward the southeast, and on 26 December the cyclone emerged over open waters. After briefly re-intensifying, the system dissipated on 29 December.

While moving ashore, Althea generated wind gusts as high as 215 km/h (134 mph) that wrought significant destruction around Townsville and left nearby Magnetic Island in a state of ruin; almost all of the buildings on the island were damaged to some degree. A significant 3.66 m (12.0 ft) storm surge battered the mainland, while high waves destroyed roads and seawalls. Beaches receded by up to 15.8 m (52 ft) due to coastal erosion. In Townsville, thousands of homes were damaged and many were destroyed. The most widespread damage was to roofs, which were often poorly or not at all secured. The damage from Althea prompted Queensland to develop its first statewide building codes, requiring new homes to be cyclone-resistant. Townsville was the first community to adopt the enhanced construction standards. In addition to the coastal effects, Althea triggered extensive river flooding in interior Queensland. Most major roads in western portions of the state were cut off by floodwaters, and hundreds of families had to leave their homes for higher ground. In the aftermath of the cyclone, 600 Australian Army soldiers aided recovery efforts in Townsville and Magnetic Island, while both state and federal governments contributed disaster relief funds. Three people were killed and damage totaled $120 million (1971 AUD).

== Meteorological history ==
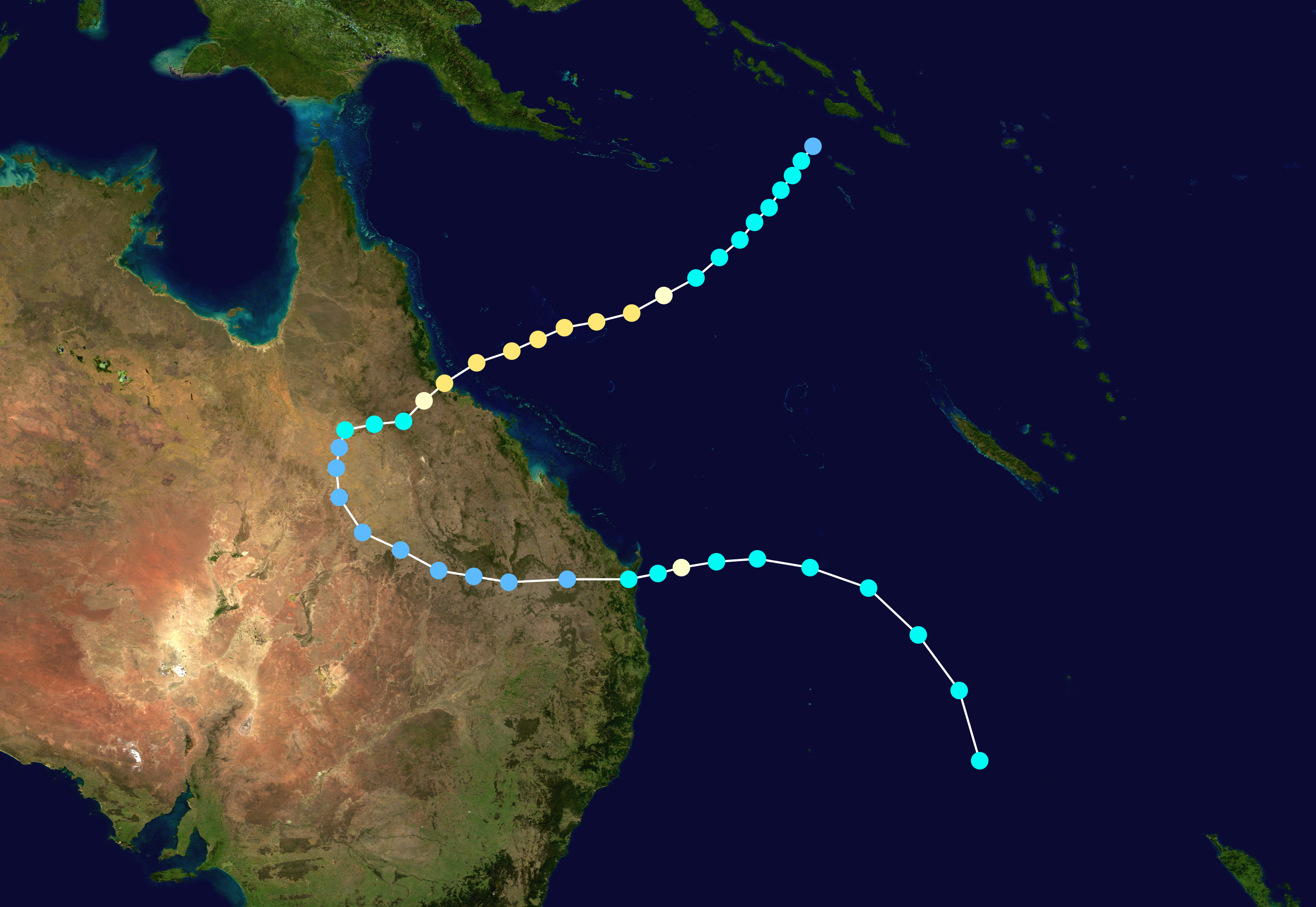
Map plotting the storm's track and intensity, according to the Saffir–Simpson scale Map key Saffir–Simpson scale Tropical depression (≤38 mph, ≤62 km/h) Tropical storm (39–73 mph, 63–118 km/h) Category 1 (74–95 mph, 119–153 km/h) Category 2 (96–110 mph, 154–177 km/h) Category 3 (111–129 mph, 178–208 km/h) Category 4 (130–156 mph, 209–251 km/h) Category 5 (≥157 mph, ≥252 km/h) Unknown Storm type Tropical cyclone Subtropical cyclone Extratropical cyclone, remnant low, tropical disturbance, or monsoon depression

Cyclone Althea originated in an expanding area of thunderstorm activity near the Solomon Islands in mid-December 1971. Although little is known about the storm's genesis because of sparse reports and infrequent weather satellite images, the disturbance is thought to have organised into a tropical low on 19 December as it tracked slowly southwestward into the Coral Sea. According to the Bureau of Meteorology's (BoM) Tropical Cyclone Warning Centre (TCWC) in Brisbane, the system reached tropical cyclone status around 06:00 UTC on 20 December, less than 300 km (200 mi) southwest of Honiara. Just after 23:00 UTC on 21 December, imagery from the United States ESSA-8 satellite showed the first indications of an emerging eye feature. Althea tracked southwest toward the coast of Queensland around a subtropical ridge to the south, and steadily strengthened. Near 18:00 UTC on 22 December, it reached its peak intensity with 10-minute maximum sustained winds of 130 km/h (80 mph); this made it a Category 3 severe tropical cyclone on the Australian scale. The cyclone's central barometric pressure of 952 hPa (28.1 inHg) was estimated using the lowest recorded air pressure, 971.5 hPa (28.69 inHg) at Townsville Airport, a 32 km (20 mi) radius of maximum wind, and environmental air pressures.

Radar image of Althea just before landfall, showing concentric eyewalls

Late on 22 December, the eye remained obscured to satellite imagery by a canopy of cirrus clouds while the cyclone passed north of Lihou Reef. Early the next day, it tracked just south of the automated weather station on Flinders Reef. Althea likely continued to organise until landfall, which occurred at 23:00 UTC on 23 December – 09:00 AEST on Christmas Eve – near Rollingstone, about 50 km (30 mi) north of Townsville. The landfall point placed Townsville and nearby Magnetic Island in the cyclone's powerful left-front quadrant. Because of the tight pressure gradient between Althea and the high pressure area to the south, gale-force winds extended well to the south of the cyclone's centre. While the system was moving ashore, land-based radar imagery identified an ongoing eyewall replacement cycle, with two distinct, concentric eyewalls – rings of intense thunderstorms surrounding the centre. The strongest winds were found under the contracting outer ring, which shrank from 55 to 39 km (34 to 24 mi) between 21:00 and 23:00 UTC to become the dominant eyewall as the inner ring dissipated. Consequently, extreme winds initially extended relatively far from the centre.

The storm quickly weakened as it continued southwest, passing just north of Charters Towers City, though it continued to produce heavy rainfall over interior Queensland. Curving southeastward, Althea re-emerged over open waters between Maryborough and Double Island Point on 26 December and began to intensify once again. At 00:00 UTC on 28 December, the cyclone reached a third peak with 10-minute winds of 110 km/h (70 mph), but as it turned more toward the south, increasingly cooler sea surface temperatures weakened the cyclone. On 29 December, Althea lost its tropical characteristics over the Tasman Sea.

== Preparations ==
In the hours leading up to landfall, the TCWC in Brisbane issued 17 cyclone warnings for coastal areas. According to the BoM, residents received 20 hours of advance warning in which to complete preparations. By late on 23 December, police and state emergency service workers were on alert for the approaching storm. High public preparedness and a relatively low loss of life were attributed to BoM cyclone awareness initiatives in the wake of 1970's deadly Cyclone Ada. However, storm victims still criticised the agency and local radio news stations for unclear, untimely, or conflicting broadcasts that caused widespread confusion. Significant delays between the issuance of warnings from TCWC Brisbane and local broadcast in the Townsville area raised some question about the need for a warning centre closer to North Queensland.

== Impact ==
Total damage from Cyclone Althea amounted to just under A$120 million (1971), and the normalised damage total for 2012, which accounts for growth and inflation, was estimated at $648 million. Throughout the affected region, 257 people were treated for storm-related injuries, mostly inflicted by airborne debris; three people were killed. In Townsville, ten people were reported missing during the cyclone: nine on three boats that were unaccounted for, and one whose car was found in a swollen creek. They were all found safe.

=== Magnetic Island ===
An estimated 90% of the buildings on Magnetic Island were damaged to some degree by 215 km/h (134 mph) wind gusts, and there was "not a tree left with leaves on it". The island's main town of Picnic Bay was hit particularly hard. About 100 people endured the cyclone in the dining room of a Picnic Bay hotel that ultimately sustained severe structural damage; 65 would remain sheltered there through Christmas Day. Around 60% of houses in Nelly Bay and 40% in Arcadia were demolished. In the village of Horseshoe Bay, one woman died in a building collapse, and reportedly only 8 out of 150 houses in the community survived the cyclone. The island suffered a nearly total power outage, and after the water pipeline from the mainland was damaged, strict usage rations were put in place until repairs could be made. About 30 people on Magnetic Island were treated for injuries sustained during the storm, and damage reached $2 million.

=== Coastal Queensland ===
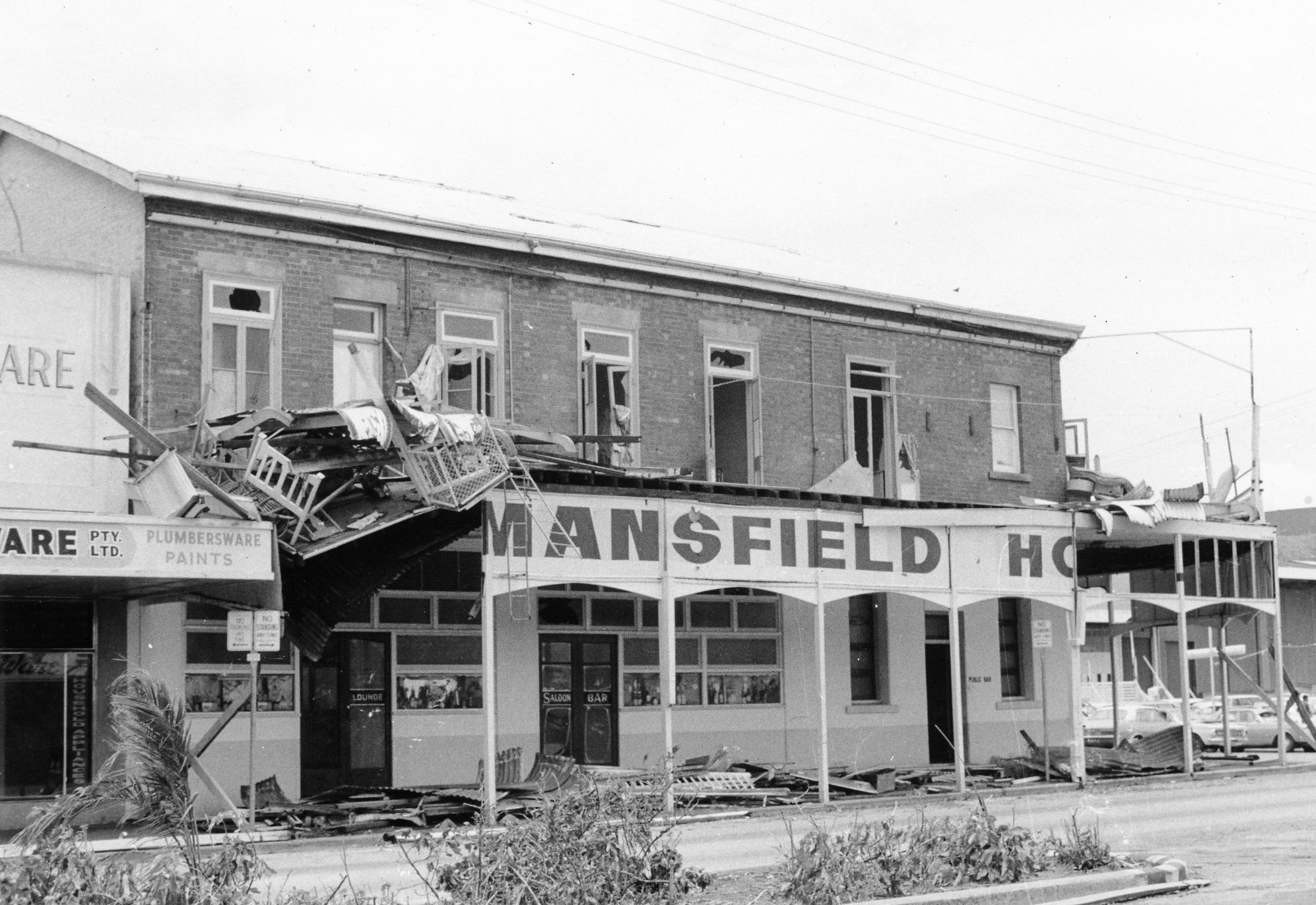
Damage to a hotel in Townsville

At the time, Althea was one of the strongest tropical cyclones to strike the coast of Queensland; it still stands as the most intense ever in the Townsville area. Gusts as high as 196 km/h (122 mph) and sustained winds of 139 km/h (86 mph) were recorded at Townsville Airport, though the anemometer was somewhat sheltered by upwind Castle Hill, so stronger winds may have occurred. The storm bent large steel utility poles and lifted houses off their foundations, while entirely stripping trees of their leaves. Pieces of dislodged debris acted as projectiles, penetrating fibre cement walls. In some cases, entire roofs crashed down on vehicles and other property. Power outages were extensive. One post-storm survey of 6,000 houses in Townsville found around 0.7% totally demolished, 1.7% with critical but repairable damage, and 13.3% with minor damage. Other estimates placed the share of damaged or destroyed houses at 60%. Several months after the storm, the Townsville City Council reported that about 200 houses had been leveled – about 1 in every 100 – with 600 more rendered uninhabitable, and as many as 4,000 damaged. Among the structures damaged or destroyed were 200 Queensland Housing Commission homes and roughly 500 of the 700 War Service Homes Commission dwellings in Townsville. Overall, Althea wrought at least $6 million in damage to government-owned buildings. The cyclone killed two people in Townsville: one man was crushed when his home collapsed, and another suffered a stress-related heart attack.

Although the worst of the storm struck near low tide, the combination of a large storm surge and high waves caused widespread damage along the coast. Storm surge values reached 2.9 m (9.5 ft) in Townsville Harbour; the Ross River experienced a 2.7 m (9 ft) water level rise that submerged streets in the city. Shipping interests in the river suffered extensively when a barge broke free of its moorings and collided with numerous smaller vessels. An estimated peak storm surge of 3.66 m (12.0 ft) occurred at Toolakea. In addition to the surge, wave action was highly destructive. Seawalls and coastal roadways were crushed by the pounding surf in places such as the Strand and Cape Pallarenda. The violent onshore flow generated severe beach erosion from Townsville to Toolakea, while north of the storm's center, in the Greater Palm group of islands, substantial erosion resulted from southwesterly winds. Beaches receded by as much as 15.8 m (52 ft) between Pallarenda and Rowes Bay, and by up to 12 m (39 ft) at Balgal Beach near the cyclone's landfall point. Storm surge values tapered off sharply to the north of the storm centre, but remained high well to the south, with above-normal water levels extending as far south as Mackay.

At Pallarenda, the storm surge swept vehicles off roads and inundated homes; around 40% of dwellings were rendered uninhabitable. Trees and power lines in the community were mangled, nearly every building was unroofed, and damage amounted to approximately $1 million. In Saunders Beach, wind-blown sand debarked trees and buffeted paint from houses. Althea generally dropped 145 to 200 mm (5.7 to 7.9 in) of rain in the Townsville area, much of it falling after the cyclone moved inland. As so many roofs had been damaged, many home interiors were left exposed to the elements. As a result, the deluge caused significant water damage to interior walls, electrical wiring, and personal belongings. Storage facilities at RAAF Garbutt were seriously damaged by the combined wind and rain, and four helicopters at the base were destroyed. In the weeks following the cyclone's passage, further downpours plagued Townsville and triggered flooding when storm drains clogged with debris were unable to handle the runoff. Severe flooding from Althea in the Burdekin River delta was exacerbated by rainfall from Cyclone Bronwyn in early January.

=== Interior Queensland ===
Farther inland, up to 250 mm (9.8 in) of rain fell in 12 hours, the most substantial rainfall in 15 years. In some drought-stricken parts of the state, the rain proved beneficial to farmers, but there was also widespread flash flooding over western and southern Queensland. Numerous communities were isolated by rising floodwaters, and hundreds of families were forced to evacuate their homes. In some cases, residents had to be moved to higher ground by boat, along with any food and provisions they were able to salvage. The overflowing Warrego River washed out parts of the Mitchell and Warrego highways near Charleville, and most of the major roads in western portions of the state were blocked by flooding. Several hundred homes in South West Queensland were inundated. In addition to damaging highways, the cyclone disrupted rail and air transportation. Railroads traveling out of Townsville were submerged under as much as 1.5 m (5 ft) of water, while several airfields were forced to close. Later, as the storm approached open water once again, it dropped over 200 mm (7.9 in) of precipitation along the southern coast of Queensland. As runoff from the heavy rains traveled downstream, southern areas continued to experience flooding into early January. Two tornadoes embedded within the cyclone's outer bands touched down in Bowen, causing damage to buildings and vegetation. Damaging thunderstorms in the suburbs of Sydney, on 25 December were broadly attributed to the weather pattern associated with Althea.

== Aftermath ==
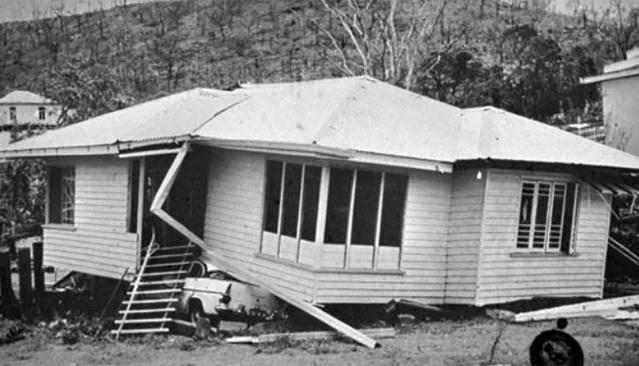
A house in Townsville lifted off its foundation and dropped on a vehicle by the winds

A state of emergency was declared for the Townsville area, making an initial $7,000 in emergency aid available for distribution among 84 individuals left homeless. Immediately after the storm, the Salvation Army began collecting and distributing donated clothing, while providing hot meals to hundreds of destitute storm victims. Australian Prime Minister William McMahon soon traveled to Townsville to assess the damage and authorise the distribution of emergency grants for affected residents. At the end of December, officials announced that the state and federal governments would jointly issue individual rebuilding grants, ranging from $1,000 to as high as $4,000 for pensioners; for the latter, higher allocations to cover the full cost of rebuilding homes were soon considered. The Townsville City Council received a special $25,000 grant with the goal of repairing schools for the start of the new academic year. By 27 December, $150,000 in private donations had arrived as organisations and radio stations throughout Queensland sought assistance for the disaster area. Western Australia provided $72,000 of relief funding, while Tasmania contributed $2,000. The Australian federal government reimbursed Queensland for an estimated $5.5–6 million spent by the state on recovery.

About 600 Australian Army soldiers, including 130 engineers, were recalled from Christmas leave and stationed at Lavarack Barracks in Townsville for relief efforts around the area. The troops were then split into 30 crews and assigned to different parts of the disaster area. In response to a request by Premier of Queensland Joh Bjelke-Petersen, the 1st Battalion, Royal Australian Regiment spent 10 days on Magnetic Island assisting in cleanup and recovery. Emergency vehicles, specialised personnel, electric generators, refrigerators, food rations, and other critical supplies were ferried to the island, and medical officers rushed there to limit the spread of gastroenteritis after several cases were reported. To recognise the efforts of the Australian Army in the aftermath of Althea, a commemorative plaque was later erected in Townsville's Anzac Memorial Park. Initial recovery work was delayed by persistent flooding of roadways, but within a few days of the cyclone, residents received around 2,000 tarpaulins to protect their damaged homes and building materials to begin repairs. By early January, the Royal Australian Air Force had airlifted 225,000 kg (500,000 lb) of emergency supplies into the Townsville area. Isolated instances of looting were reported after the disaster, and multiple local merchants were investigated for alleged price gouging. After the season ended, the name Althea was retired from the Australian tropical cyclone naming list due to the cyclone's severe impact.

Many of the damaged houses were of poor construction, and in the wake of Althea, engineering studies of the destruction resulted in a new understanding of the structural design loads necessary to withstand severe winds. In particular, inadequate roof cladding and fastening systems were among the primary points of failure. Consequently, much stricter building codes were explored in Queensland and Australia as a whole. Three years later, Cyclone Tracy's devastation in Darwin, Northern Territory, bolstered the trend of more rigorous construction specifications in the country. Many of the buildings destroyed by Tracy were government housing units constructed according to new guidelines based on findings after Althea, showing the need for further study. The severe cyclones prompted Queensland to develop its first statewide building regulations in 1975; the new Queensland Home Building Code was fully adopted in the mid-1980s. Under the new regulations, roofs had to be more securely anchored than before using bolts and reinforced fastenings. Having seen the dangers of deficient construction first-hand, Townsville was the first community to enact the enhanced building standards, and served as a testing ground for further revisions. The Cyclone Testing Station, a wind damage research organisation housed within James Cook University's Townsville campus, was established in 1977 in response to cyclones Althea and Tracy.

== See also ==
- 1998 Townsville floods
- Climate of Australia
- List of Queensland tropical cyclones

- Cyclone Tessi
- Cyclone Yasi
