= PS George Rennie =

Coordinates: 19°10′51.12″S 146°50′01.66″E

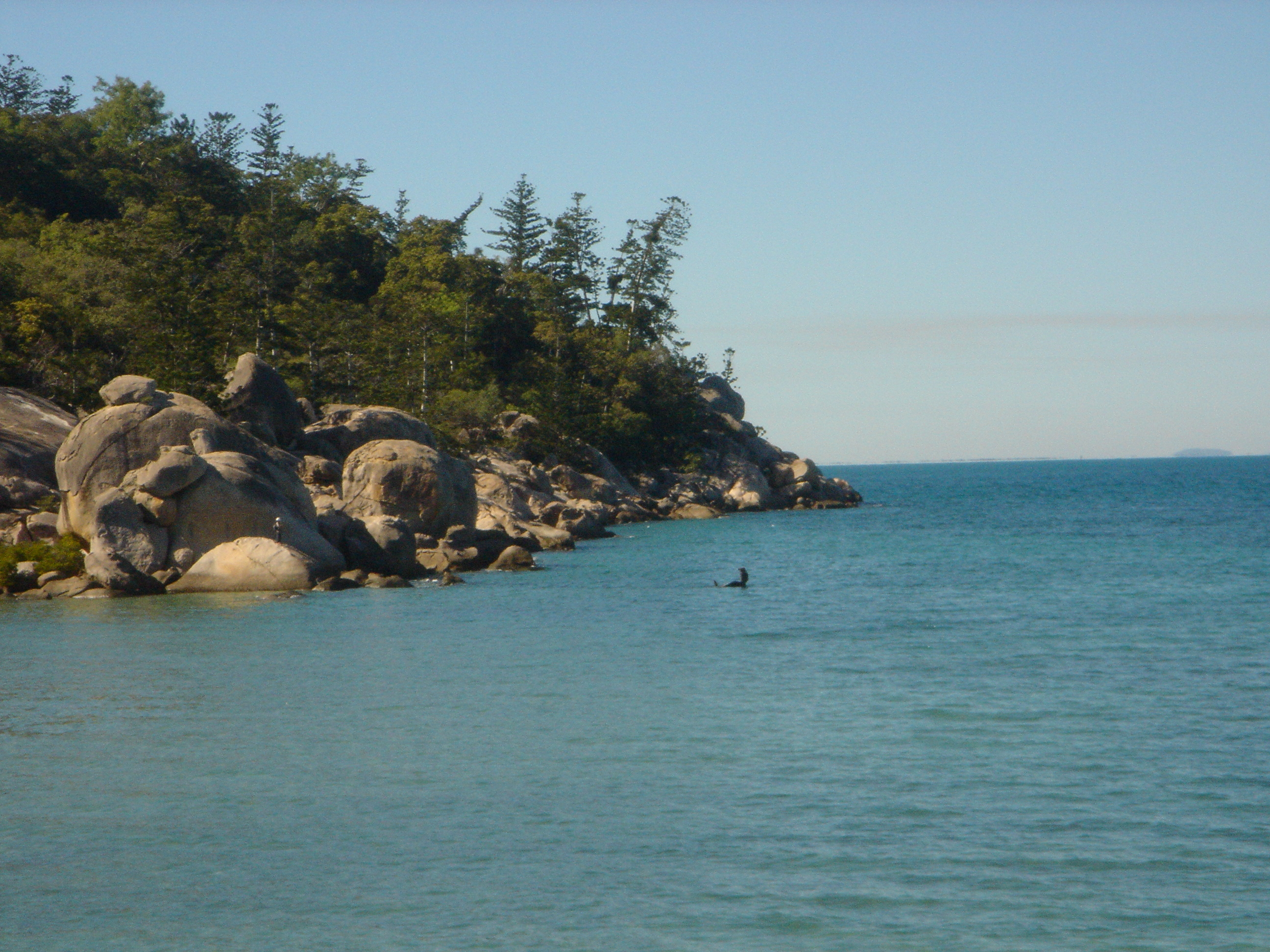
- The wreck of the George Rennie

History

Australia
- Name: George Rennie
- Owner: Howard Smith
- Completed: 1885
- Out of service: 1902
- Fate: Scuttled in Picnic Bay, Magnetic Island at 2 metres depth

General characteristics
- Type: Paddle Steamer (1885-1896); Coal Lighter (1896-1902)
- Tonnage: 151 GRT

PS George Rennie was a steel-hulled ship scuttled in the lee of Hawking Point, Magnetic Island, Queensland, Australia. It was built in 1885 in Middlesex as a 151-gross-ton paddle steamer. In 1896 the vessel was purchased by Howard Smith who converted it into a lighter. Howard Smith used the vessel to transport coal from the anchorage at West Point to Townsville Harbour. It was scuttled in 1902 to serve as a breakwater for a small jetty in the bay. The remains of the ship can still be seen at low tide from Picnic Bay beach.

== See also ==
- List of shipwrecks
