= SS City of Adelaide (1863) =

Iron-hulled ship

- City of Adelaide between 1871 and 1890, as a two-masted steamship

History

Australia
- Name: City of Adelaide
- Owner: 1864: Australasian Steam Navigation Company; 1887: British India & Queensland Agency; 1887: Australasian United Steam Navigation Company; 1890: WA Ritchie; 1895: GJ Robertson; 1902: Howard Smith; 1915: George Butler
- Port of registry: 1864: Melbourne; 1887: Sydney; 1887: London; 1890: Sydney; 1902: Melbourne; 1915: Townsville
- Builder: J & G Thomson, Govan
- Yard number: 67
- Launched: 22 December 1863
- Completed: 1864
- Out of service: 1912
- Refit: 1871 reduced to two masts; 1890 converted to four-masted jackass barque; 1902 converted to coal hulk
- Identification: UK official number 49261; code letters WCHB
- Fate: 1912 caught fire; 1915 bought for scuttling; 1916 ran aground

General characteristics
- Type: iron-hulled ship: 1864: 3-masted sail-steamer; 1871: 2-masted steamship; 1890: 4-masted sailing barque
- Tonnage: 1863: 615 NRT, 838 GRT; 1871: 824 NRT, 1,212 GRT; 1890: 779 NRT, 1,212 GRT
- Length: 1863: 251.4 ft (76.6 m); 1871: 252.8 ft (77.1 m); 1893: 246.0 ft (75.0 m)
- Beam: 28.3 ft (8.6 m)
- Depth: 16.6 ft (5.1 m)
- Installed power: until 1890: 200 HP
- Propulsion: until 1890: 1 × screw; 1 × marine steam engine
- Sail plan: 1890: jackass barque

City of Adelaide was an iron-hulled ship that was launched in Scotland in 1863, spent a long career in Australian passenger and cargo service, and sank off the coast of Queensland in 1916. She served with several Australian shipowners, including the Australasian Steam Navigation Company, Australasian United Steam Navigation Company and Howard Smith.

City of Adelaide ship was built as a three-masted sail-steamer. In 1871 one of her masts was removed to increase her passenger accommodation. In 1890 her steam engine was removed and she was refitted as a four-masted jackass barque. In 1902 she was turned into a coal hulk. In 1912 she was gutted by fire.

In 1916 her burnt hulk ran aground in Cockle Bay, Magnetic Island, Queensland. In 1942 four people were killed when a Royal Australian Air Force aircraft collided with one of her masts. In 1971 Cyclone Althea broke up part of her wreck, but its remains are still visible in Cockle Bay.

== Building ==
J & G Thomson of Govan, Glasgow built City of Adelaide for the Australasian Steam Navigation Company. She was launched on 22 December 1863 and completed in 1864. Her registered length was 246.0 ft (75.0 m), her beam was 28.3 ft (8.6 m) and her depth was 16.6 ft (5.1 m). Thomson's also built her marine steam engine, which had two cylinders and was rated at 200 horsepower.

Her owners registered City of Adelaide at Sydney. Her United Kingdom official number was 49261 and her code letters were WCHB.

== Career ==
City of Adelaide ran regular passenger services between several destinations including Melbourne, Sydney, Honolulu and San Francisco.

In 1871 the ship was refitted, and her masts were reduced from three to two to increase her passenger accommodation. She served for a further 14 years before being retired in 1885. After the merger of the Australasian Steam Navigation Company with the Queensland Steam Shipping Company, in 1887, City of Adelaide continued in service with the successor company Australasian United Steam Navigation Company.

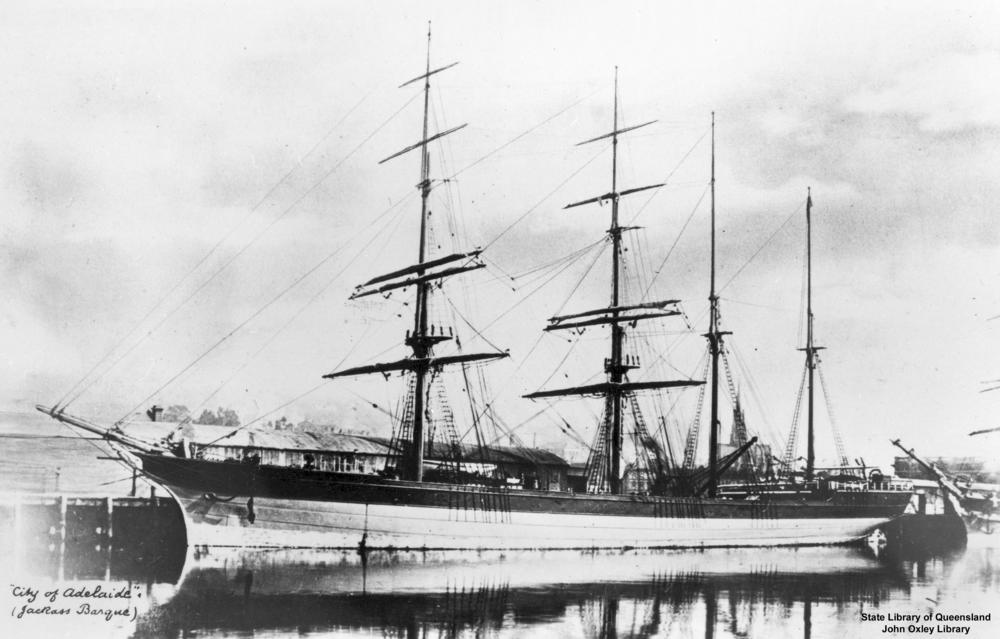
City of Adelaide between 1890 and 1902, when she was a four-masted jackass barque

In 1890 to WA Ritchie of Sydney bought her and had her converted to a four-masted jackass barque by removing her boilers and engines and adding two new masts. In 1895 GJ Robertson of Sydney bought her. In 1902 Howard Smith of Townsville bought her and turned her into a coal hulk.

In 1912 the ship caught fire and burnt for some days before flames were extinguished. TIn 1915, by George Butler, the son of the first European resident of Magnetic Island, bought her burnt hulk. He had the hull stripped, and an attempt was made to float the ship to Magnetic Island's Picnic Bay, where she would be scuttled as a breakwater for a jetty. However, as the ship was being towed from Townsville to Picnic Bay she ran aground off Magnetic Island's Cockle Bay.

== Wreck ==
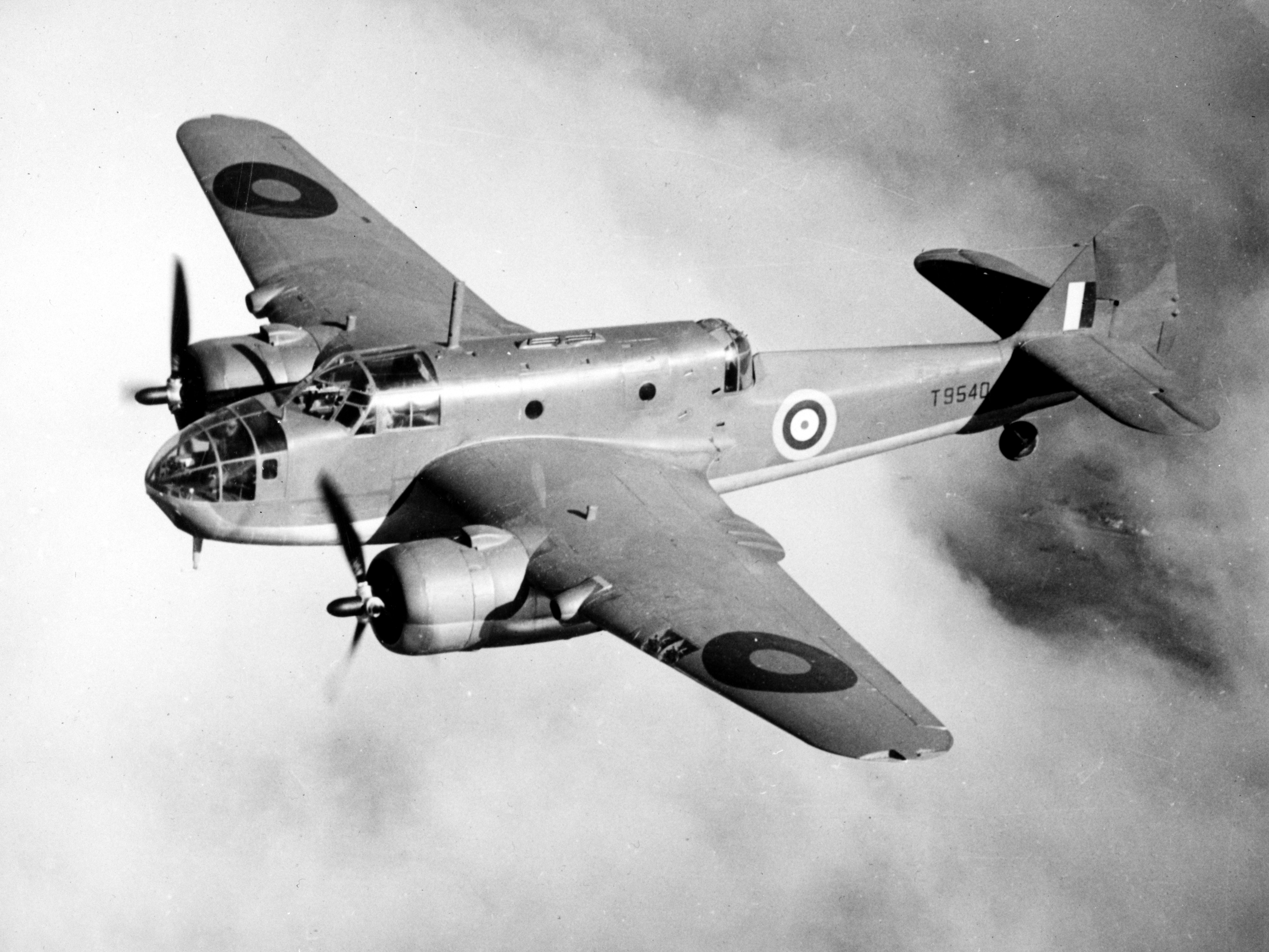
A Bristol Beaufort aircraft of 100 Squadron RAAF, like the one that collided with one of the masts of City of Adelaide's wreck

In World War II the Royal Australian Air Force (RAAF) used the wreck for target practice for bomber crews from the nearby Garbutt Airfield. On 22 October 1942, six RAAF Bristol Beaufort bombers of 100 Squadron made a coordinated mock torpedo attack on Townsville Harbour, followed by a coordinated practice bombing of the wreck. The mock attack on Townsville Harbour was a success, after which the six bombers climbed to about 1,000 feet (300 m) and flew in a vee formation towards Cockle Bay.

Several of the aircraft dived at the wreck in a bombing run, during which one of the aircraft appeared to strike one of the masts of the sunken ship, before crashing into the shallow sea about 700 metres (770 yd) from the ship. The plane's fuselage disintegrated on impact, instantly killing three RAAF officers and a United States Navy officer aboard the bomber.

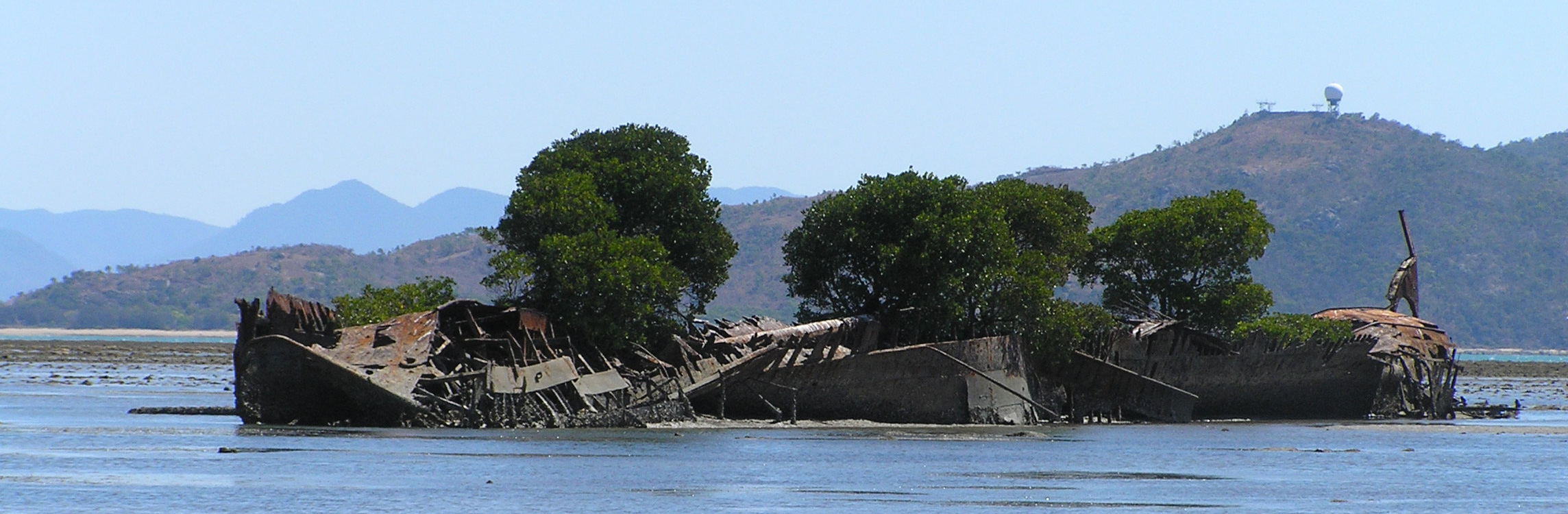
City of Adelaide's wreck at low tide

The wreck is about 300 metres (330 yd) off the shore of Cockle Bay. On 24 December 1971 Cyclone Althea struck the coast of northern Queensland near Magnetic Island, causing the part of the wreck's iron hull to collapse. However, the wreck remains an artificial island, hosting a diversity of plant and animal life. The location of the wreck is 19.174842°S 146.825471°E.
