= Arcadia, Queensland =

Arcadia
- Suburb
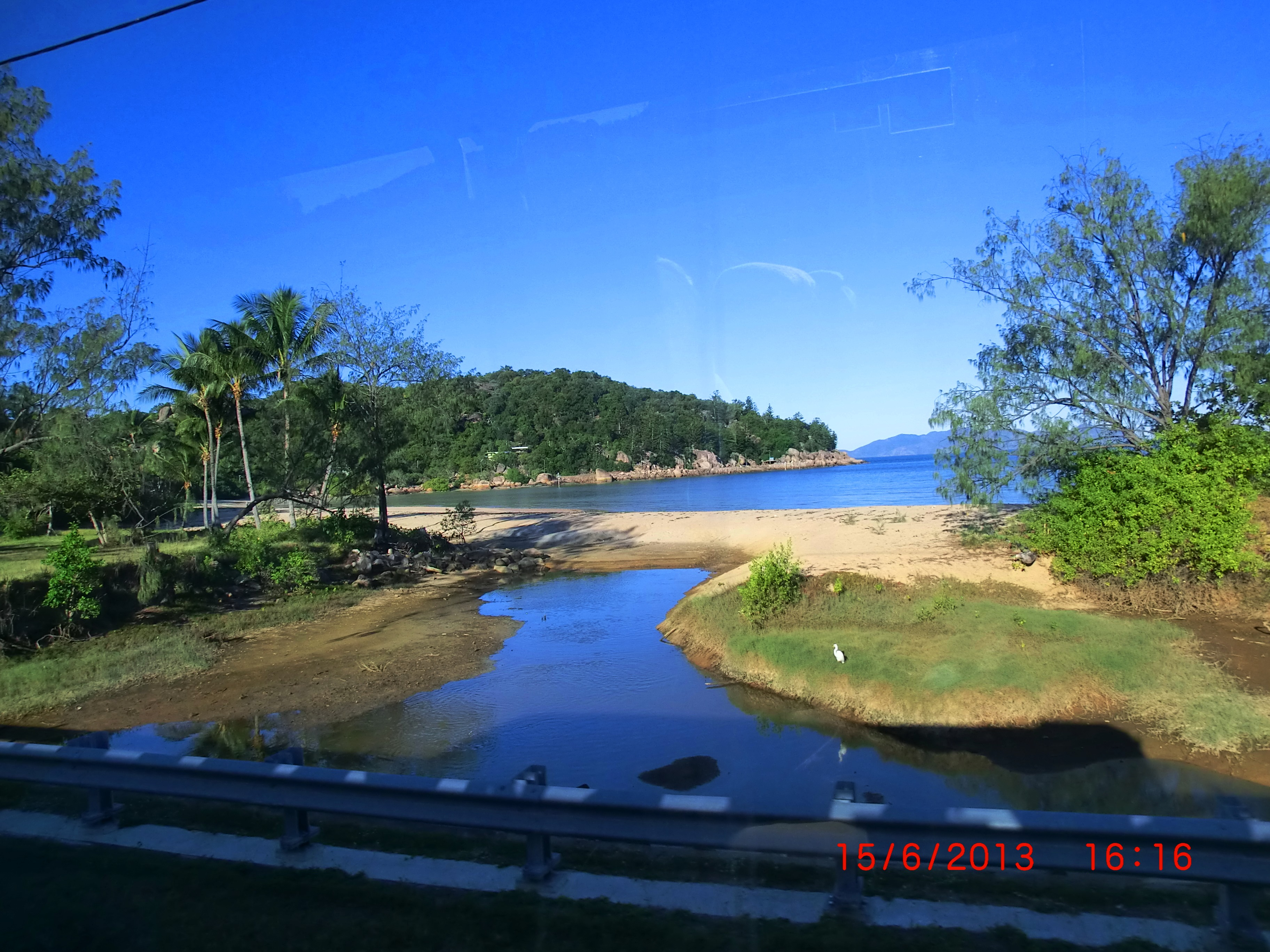
- Lagoon View, Arcadia

- Interactive map of Arcadia
- Coordinates: 19.1461°S 146.8608°E
- Country: Australia
- State: Queensland
- City: Magnetic Island
- LGA: City of Townsville
- Location: 2.5 km (1.6 mi) NE of Nelly Bay; 3.4 km (2.1 mi) S of Horseshoe Bay; 5.5 km (3.4 mi) NE of Picnic Bay

Government
  - State electorate: Townsville
  - Federal division: Herbert

Area
  - Total: 5.8 km^{2} (2.2 sq mi)

Population
  - Total: 246 (2021 census)
  - Density: 42.4/km^{2} (109.9/sq mi)
- Time zone: UTC+10:00 (AEST)
- Postcode: 4819
Suburbs around Arcadia
| West Point | Horseshoe Bay | Florence Bay |
| Nelly Bay | Arcadia | Coral Sea |
| Nelly Bay | Coral Sea | Coral Sea |

Arcadia is a coastal suburb on Magnetic Island in the City of Townsville, Queensland, Australia. In the 2021 census, Arcadia had a population of 246 people.

The town of Alma Bay is within the suburb (19.1483°S 146.8677°E).

== Geography ==
Arcadia is predominantly residential with around 97% of the dwellings being housing or unit type dwellings.

== Demographics ==
In the 2016 census, Arcadia had a population of 248 people.

In the 2021 census, Arcadia had a population of 246 people.

== Education ==
There are no schools in Arcadia. The nearest government primary school is Magnetic Island State School in neighbouring Nelly Bay to the south-west. The nearest government secondary school is Townsville State High School in Railway Estate on the Townsville mainland.

== Attractions ==
There are a number of lookouts:

- Arcadia Lookout (also known as Alma Lookout) on the northern end of Endeavour Road (19.1458°S 146.8656°E)
- Horseshoe Bay Lookout on the Nelly Bay - Acacia Bay track (19.1383°S 146.8584°E)
- Sphinx Lookout on the Sphinx Lookout Track (19.1428°S 146.8675°E)

Arcadia is also home to Alma Bay and Geoffrey Bay, which are the Island's best known beaches. It is also home to Centaur Guest House, a World War 2 house built in memory of the hospital ship Centaur.

Arcadia is home to the famous toad racing and a small population of rock wallabies.
