= Nelly Bay, Queensland =

Nelly Bay
- Town
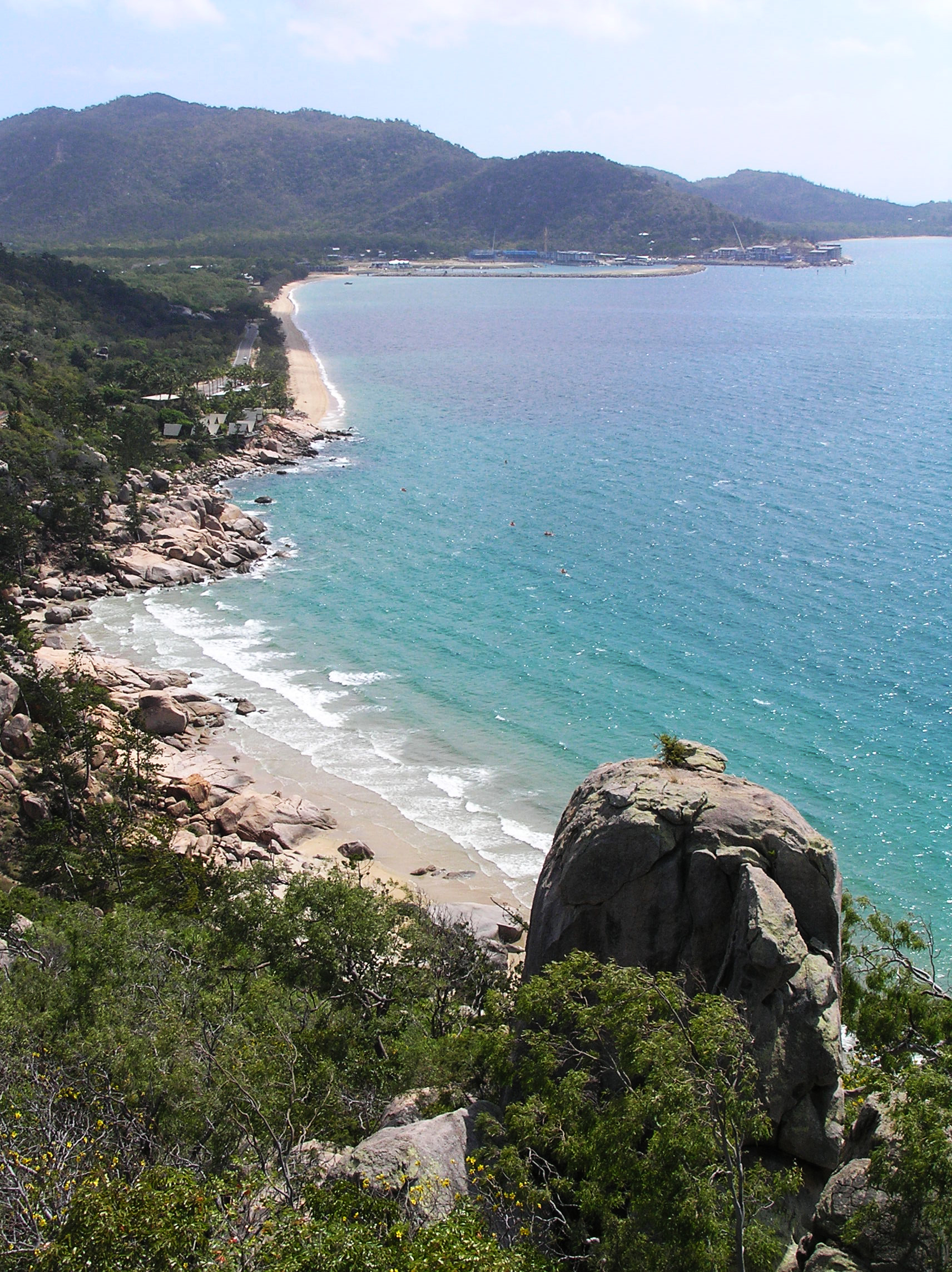
- Rocky Bay (foreground) and Nelly Bay foreshore, showing Magnetic Harbour in the distance.

- Interactive map of Nelly Bay
- Coordinates: 19.1583°S 146.8486°E
- Country: Australia
- State: Queensland
- City: Magnetic Island
- LGA: City of Townsville
- Location: 3.9 km (2.4 mi) NE of Picnic Bay; 6.0 km (3.7 mi) SSW of Horseshoe Bay

Government
  - State electorate: Townsville
  - Federal division: Herbert

Area
  - Total: 4.7 km^{2} (1.8 sq mi)

Population
  - Total: 1,213 (2021 census)
  - Density: 258.1/km^{2} (668/sq mi)
- Time zone: UTC+10:00 (AEST)
- Postcode: 4819
- County: Elphinstone
- Parish: Magnetic
Localities around Nelly Bay
West Point	West Point	Arcadia
West Point	Nelly Bay	Coral Sea
Picnic Bay	Picnic Bay	Coral Sea

Nelly Bay is a town on Magnetic Island and a suburb of the City of Townsville, Queensland, Australia. A tourism hub on the island, it is especially significant as the site of the ferry terminal, which links it to Townsville. In the 2021 census, the suburb of Nelly Bay had a population of 1,213 people.

== History ==
Robert Hayles, a local entrepreneur, started tourist ventures in the bay around 1911 and in 1917 correspondence between the Townsville Harbour Board and the Queensland Marine Department notes the existence of a jetty in the bay. During the Second World War an anti-aircraft battery was built on the foreshore of the bay. While the concrete foundations of the battery still exist, they are now overgrown, and surrounded by a housing estate.

Nelly Bay Post Office opened on 1 July 1927 (a receiving office had been open from 1923), closed in 1982 and reopened in 1994.

Nelly Bay Provisional School opened on 15 September 1924. In 1928 it became Nelly Bay State School. The school closed on 18 October 1942 but reopened on 1 October 1943. It changed its name to Magnetic Island State School in the 1970s.

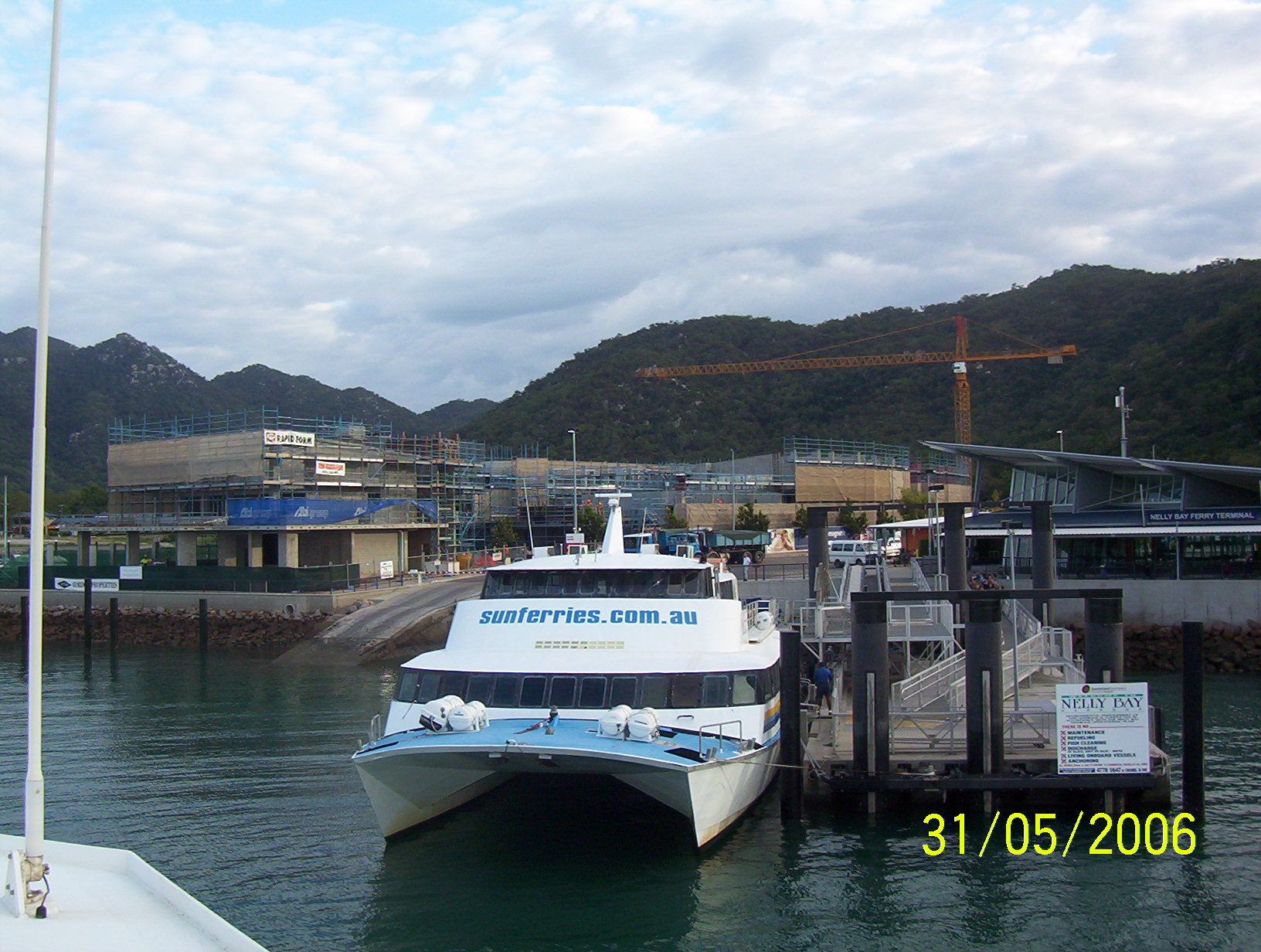
Nelly Bay Ferry Terminal (on right) with construction at Magnetic Harbour (to see, click on the blank and then click on the image after the file opened)

In February 1984, Bob Katter Jr., the then new Minister for Northern Development, announced the $100 million development of a harbour and marina precinct in Nelly Bay proposed by Geoff Orpin, a former Maroochy Shire Councillor who moved to Magnetic Island in 1980. At the time, the project was to be called Magnetic Keys, and Katter insisted all environmental concerns would be addressed with construction beginning within six months. However, it was another 18 months before the developer was even able to obtain the correct permission and leases to perform feasibility and environmental impact studies in the bay.

In 1987, the development was sold to the Linkon Group and Essington Developments, but Essington Developments sold their interests in the project soon-after to Pacific Properties Pty Ltd.

While there was a large amount of interest in the development, the Great Barrier Reef Marine Park Authority (GBRMPA) delayed granting a permit due to the possible environmental effects of the proposed harbor development. In October 1987, they finally changed the zoning of the bay to permit the harbour development, but waited until October of the following year before issuing the necessary construction permit in an atmosphere of controversy. The permit included certain conditions the developer had to meet, including rehabilitation insurance to cover the rehabilitation of the environment should the development not proceed.

At around the same time, the Townsville City Council, originally opposed to the development, rezoned the Bright Point area for tourist usage and requested state government ministerial rezoning for the entire development. The Townsville City Council further approved the construction of a hotel and unit development on the Bright Point headland which also allowed the headland to be quarried for rubble for the harbor breakwater under the pretext of preparing the site for the development.

Major construction works started in August 1989, despite major objection from local residents and environmental groups. The following year saw a number of court cases and tribunals held in opposition to the project, but none of these halted construction. It was later alleged that the developer made an unrecorded donation to Townsville Mayor Tony Mooney's election campaign. Further improprieties were suggested between Townsville City Council employees and one of the judges overseeing a case appealing the development. It was also alleged that the developer offered a bribe to GBRMPA during its deliberations some years earlier.

In 1990, one of the main lenders for the project collapsed, followed by one of the major stakeholders in the project, Pacific Properties. However, work continued to accelerate until July 1990, when the dredge being used on the project sank, followed shortly by the collapse of the Magnetic Keys Consortium. It was then revealed that rehabilitation insurance had not been obtained by the developer, and the development was surrendered to the state government.

In 1995, a number of proposals were raised to complete the development. None proceeded. In 1998, these proposals were revised to reduce the number of lots from 88 to 40 and more than halve the occupancy from 1328 to 638. With some minor alterations, this was the proposal which was finally agreed.

In 2003, the new ferry terminal began operations. The terminal contains a small retail area and is next to bus stops and car parking.

== Demographics ==
In the 2011 census, the suburb of Nelly Bay had a population of 1,055 people.

In the 2016 census, the suburb of Nelly Bay had a population of 1,196 people.

In the 2021 census, the suburb of Nelly Bay had a population of 1,213 people.

== Transport ==
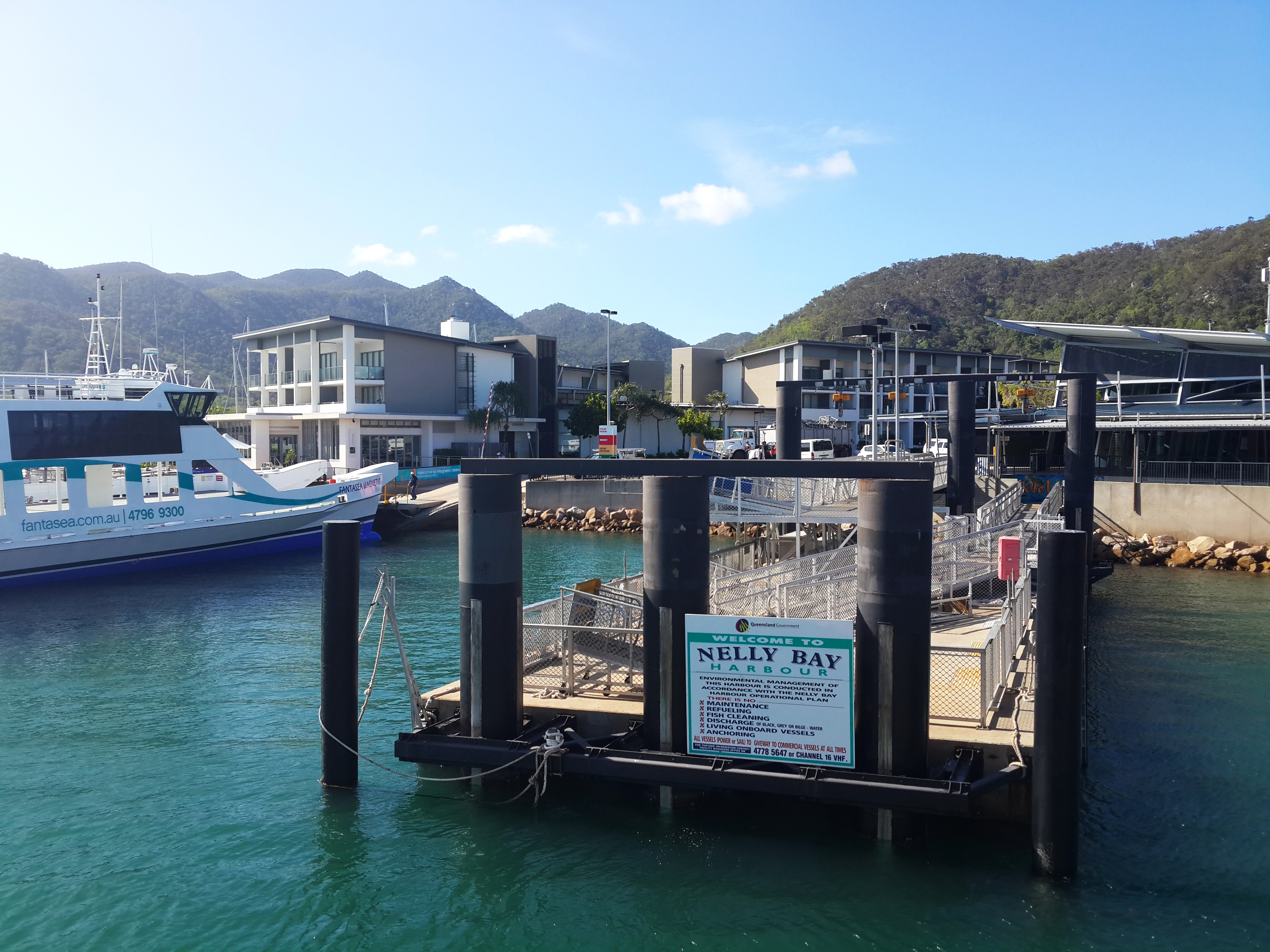
Nelly Bay Ferry Terminal

Nelly Bay is home to Magnetic Island's largest infrastructure development, Magnetic Harbour, also known as Nelly Bay Harbour. The development consists of a new ferry and barge terminal, with an emergency services helipad, retail services, a marina and multi-storey residential dwellings. A frequent ferry service is operated by Sunferries, with its passenger ferry to the Townsville breakwater, and Fantasea with its vehicular barge to South Townsville.

== Education ==
Magnetic Island State School is a government primary (Prep-6) school for boys and girls at 16 Mandalay Avenue (19.1571°S 146.8516°E). In 2017, the school had an enrolment of 134 students with 11 teachers (8 full-time equivalent) and 11 non-teaching staff (6 full-time equivalent). The school includes a special education program.

There are no secondary schools on the island. The nearest government secondary school is Townsville State High School in Railway Estate on the mainland.

== Amenities ==
The Townsville City Council operate a mobile library service which visits the Lions Park at Nelly Bay on Tuesday, but its opening hours may be affected by the tide times.

== Notable residents ==
- Julian Assange, WikiLeaks co-founder, sporadically lived the first years of his life in Nelly Bay with his mother in the early 1970s.
