= List of shipwrecks in 1914 =

The list of shipwrecks in 1914 includes ships sunk, foundered, grounded, or otherwise lost in 1914.

table of contents
← 1913 / 1914 / 1915 →
| Jan | Feb | Mar | Apr |
| May | Jun | Jul | Aug |
| Sep | Oct | Nov | Dec |
Unknown date

Losses in 1914 according to the U.S. Department of Commerce (Note: Not including sailing vessels or those steam ships under 100 gross tons)
| Flag | Aban. | Found. | Fire | Coll. | Wreck (Note: Includes vessels lost after being stranded, striking rocks, sunken wrecks, etc.) | War | Other | Miss | Total |
|---|---|---|---|---|---|---|---|---|---|
| UK | 1 | 6 | 7 | 17 | 43 | 100 | 1 | 19 | 194 |
| British Colonies | 1 | 2 | 1 | 2 | 17 | 1 | 1 | 0 | 25 |
| US | | 5 | 1 | 3 | 7 | | 1 | 1 | 18 |
| Austro-Hungarian | | | | | 1 | 4 | | | 5 |
| Danish | | 1 | | | 4 | 6 | | | 11 |
| Dutch | | 2 | | | 2 | 5 | | | 9 |
| French | | 2 | | 2 | 7 | 1 | | 1 | 13 |
| German | | 1 | 1 | 1 | 12 | 13 | | 4 | 32 |
| Italian | | 1 | 1 | | 6 | | | 1 | 9 |
| Japanese | | 2 | | 6 | 11 | | | 3 | 22 |
| Norwegian | | 5 | | 4 | 20 | 8 | | 1 | 38 |
| Russian | | | 1 | | 4 | 7 | | | 12 |
| Spanish | | 2 | 1 | 2 | 1 | | | 1 | 7 |
| Swedish | | 1 | 1 | 3 | 7 | 8 | | 3 | 23 |
| Europe, rest | | 2 | 1 | 1 | 6 | | | | 10 |
| C. and S. America | | 1 | 1 | | 5 | | | | 7 |
| Other | | | | | 1 | 1 | | | 2 |

== Unknown date ==
List of shipwrecks: Unknown date 1914
| Ship | State | Description |
|---|---|---|
| America | United States | The passenger and package delivery ship ran aground in Lake Superior, suffering considerable damage. She was refloated, repaired, and returned to service. |
| Annie Perry | United States | The fishing schooner was sunk in a collision with Surf in the harbor at Boston, Massachusetts. Abandoned by her owners she was raised and sold. Repaired and returned to service. |
| County of Devon | United Kingdom | The cargo ship foundered in the Atlantic Ocean in late February or early March. Her crew were rescued by the tanker Deutschland (Germany) and landed at Copenhagen, Denmark on 8 March. |
| Florence J. | United States | The oil service vessel capsized in Puget Sound immediately after being launched at Dockton, Washington, in either 1913 or 1914. She was righted, completed, and eventually entered service. |
| G. P. Hudson | United States | The vessel was reported lost in Chignik Bay (56°18′N 158°24′W) on the south coast of the Alaska Peninsula in the Territory of Alaska. |
| SMS Markomannia | Imperial German Navy | World War I: The auxiliary cruiser was sunk in the Indian Ocean by HMS Yarmouth (Royal Navy). |
| Maria O. Teal | United States | The four-masted schooner foundered in the Atlantic Ocean sometime before 9 February. Her crew were rescued by Rio Colorado (United Kingdom). |
| Nostra Senora del Rosario | Italy | The barque departed Cádiz, Spain, for Montevideo, Uruguay, on 17 February. She subsequently foundered in the Atlantic Ocean with the loss of all hands. A lifeboat with a decomposed body was found in mid-March 1914 off Cádiz. |
| Schcold | United States | The purse-seine fishing vessel was lost in Frederick Sound in the Alexander Archipelago in Southeast Alaska. |
| Senator | United States | The 138.8-foot (42.3 m) two-masted schooner was abandoned at Sturgeon Bay, Wisconsin, due to age and her poor hull condition in either 1914 or 1915. Her wreck lies at 44°49.617′N 087°22.095′W. |

== See also ==
- Lists of shipwrecks
