= Picnic Bay, Queensland =

Picnic Bay
- Town
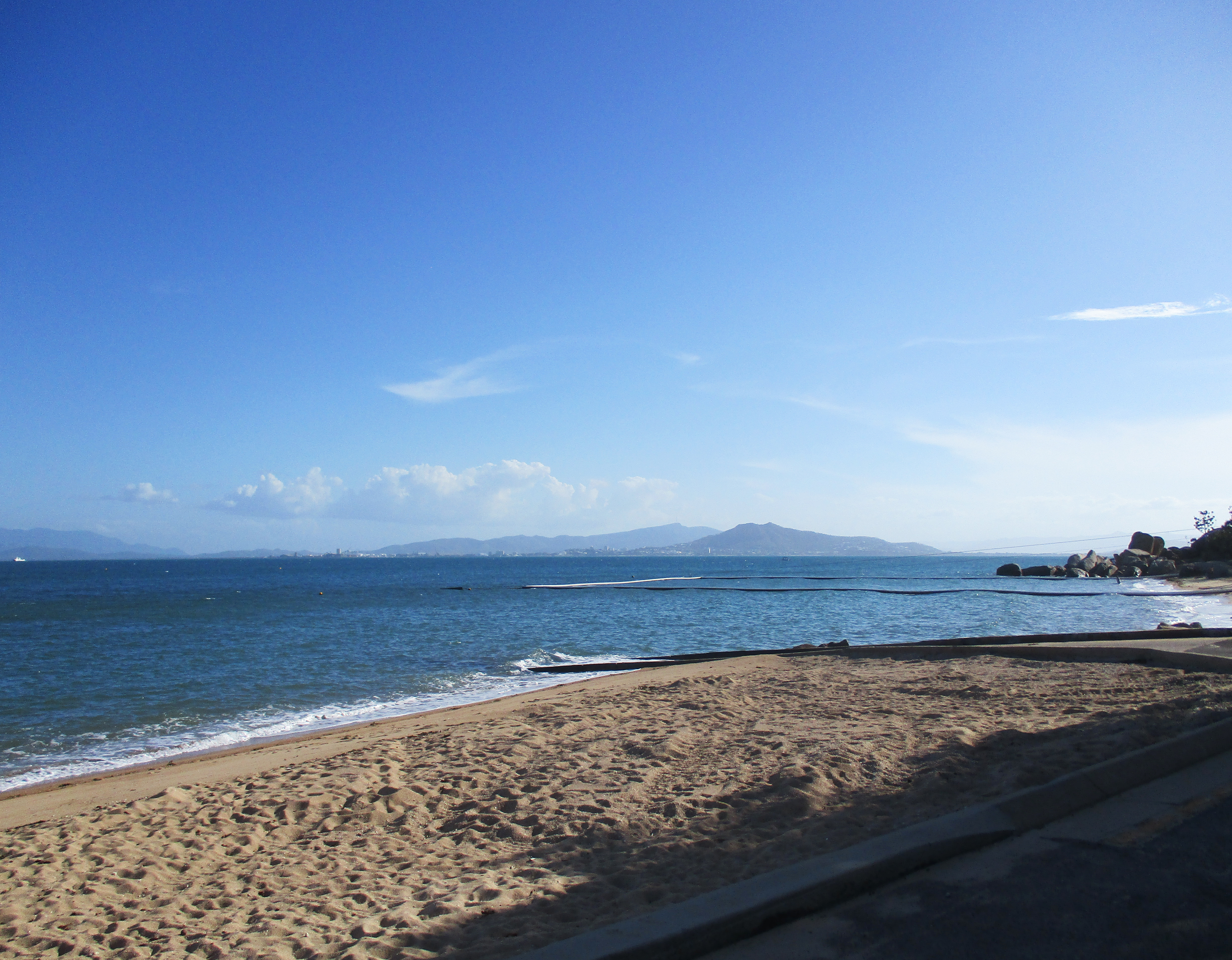
- Picnic Bay, Magnetic Island

- Interactive map of Picnic Bay
- Coordinates: 19.18°S 146.8380°E
- Country: Australia
- State: Queensland
- City: Magnetic Island
- LGA: City of Townsville
- Location: 3.9 km (2.4 mi) SW of Nelly Bay; 6.5 km (4.0 mi) SW of Arcadia; 9.9 km (6.2 mi) SW of Horseshoe Bay
- Established: 1877

Government
  - State electorate: Townsville
  - Federal division: Herbert

Area
  - Total: 4.1 km^{2} (1.6 sq mi)

Population
  - Total: 367 (2021 census)
  - Density: 89.5/km^{2} (231.8/sq mi)
- Time zone: UTC+10:00 (AEST)
- Postcode: 4819
- County: Elphinstone
- Parish: Magnetic
Localities around Picnic Bay
West Point	West Point	West Point
Coral Sea	Picnic Bay	Nelly Bay
Coral Sea	Coral Sea	Coral Sea

Picnic Bay (formerly Camoomilli) is a town and suburb of Magnetic Island in the City of Townsville, Queensland, Australia. It is named for the bay on the southernmost corner of Magnetic Island where the town is situated. In the 2021 census, the suburb of Picnic Bay had a population of 367 people.

== Geography ==
The town of Picnic Bay is on the southernmost point of the island. It has Cockle Bay (19.1767°S 146.8306°E) to the west, the bay Picnic Bay (19.1817°S 146.8411°E) to the south and Rocky Bay (19.1742°S 146.8492°E) to the east. Nobby Head which is also known as Point Burgamunda (19.1817°S 146.8367°E) separates the Cockle Bay coast from the Picnic Bay beach, while Hawkins Point (19.1811°S 146.8461°E) separates Picnic Bay coast from the Rocky Bay coast.

Until 2003, the bay was the landing site for ferry services from the mainland, but, due to the deterioration of the jetty, ferries now use a new terminal at nearby Nelly Bay.

== History ==
=== Early European settlement ===
On 27 September 1877, the Queensland Government sold 100 allotments in the "Town of Camoomillla situate on Picnic Bay".

The first known settlement of Picnic Bay was by Harry Butler and his family who established a small dairy, orchard and mixed farm in Picnic Bay in 1877 when Magnetic Island was declared a quarantine station. The family experimented in the cultivation of pineapples in the bay and as part of a tourism venture built a guest house establishing an intermittent ferry service from Townsville. The Butler family cared for the sick who were quarantined on the island prior to the construction of the permanent quarantine station at West Point.

Having purchased the Butler family's huts in Picnic Bay in 1898, Robert Hayles, an entrepreneur formerly a pastoral worker in western Queensland, erected a two storey hotel, dance hall and a temporary jetty at the western end of the bay to establish a larger tourist operation in the bay.

=== 1900-1949 ===
In 1900, Hayles applied to build a permanent wooden jetty (6 feet wide and 100 feet long). The jetty was approved by the Queensland Marine Department in March 1900 and the jetty hurriedly constructed. In 1903 Cyclone Leonta struck Townsville and Magnetic Island and caused serious damage to Hayles' new jetty. Hayles carried out extensive repairs on the structure but by 1910 the structure was in poor condition. In 1909 Hayles was granted a creek-front location in Ross Creek on the mainland and was able to establish a consistent passenger service to Magnetic Island. With Hayles establishing a regular ferry service to Magnetic Island the permanent population of the Island began to grow.

In June 1910, Hayles was granted another permit to construct a jetty in Picnic Bay. Although it is unclear whether the second jetty was constructed in addition to the one constructed in 1900 or to replace it, a letter dated February 1917 from the Townsville Harbour Board to the Marine Department acknowledges the presence of two privately owned jetties in the bay. In 1911, Hayles' hotel was destroyed by a fire and a new hotel began construction. At around the same time, Hayles further expanded his business on Magnetic Island launching further tourism ventures in Nelly Bay, Horseshoe Bay and Arcadia. In June 1920 the Townsville Harbour Board were vested control of the jetty at Picnic Bay, as well as those established in other bays.

In November 1916, the Queensland Government reserved 5 acres (2.0 ha) at Camoomilli for a school. Magnetic Island State School opened on 1 March 1917. On 24 September 1925 it was renamed Picnic Bay State School. It closed in 1970.

Magnetic Island Post Office opened on 1 July 1927 (a receiving office had been open from 1912). It was renamed Picnic Bay in 1935.

With the outbreak of war in 1939, Hayles' facilities in Picnic Bay were commandeered by Australian defense forces as a rest and recreation camp for service personnel and were not returned until the end of World War II in 1945. Hayles undertook a large upgrade of the facilities on Magnetic Island during the period following the war including upgrades of roads, buildings and the dredging of a channel for vessels entering Picnic Bay.

=== 1950 onwards ===
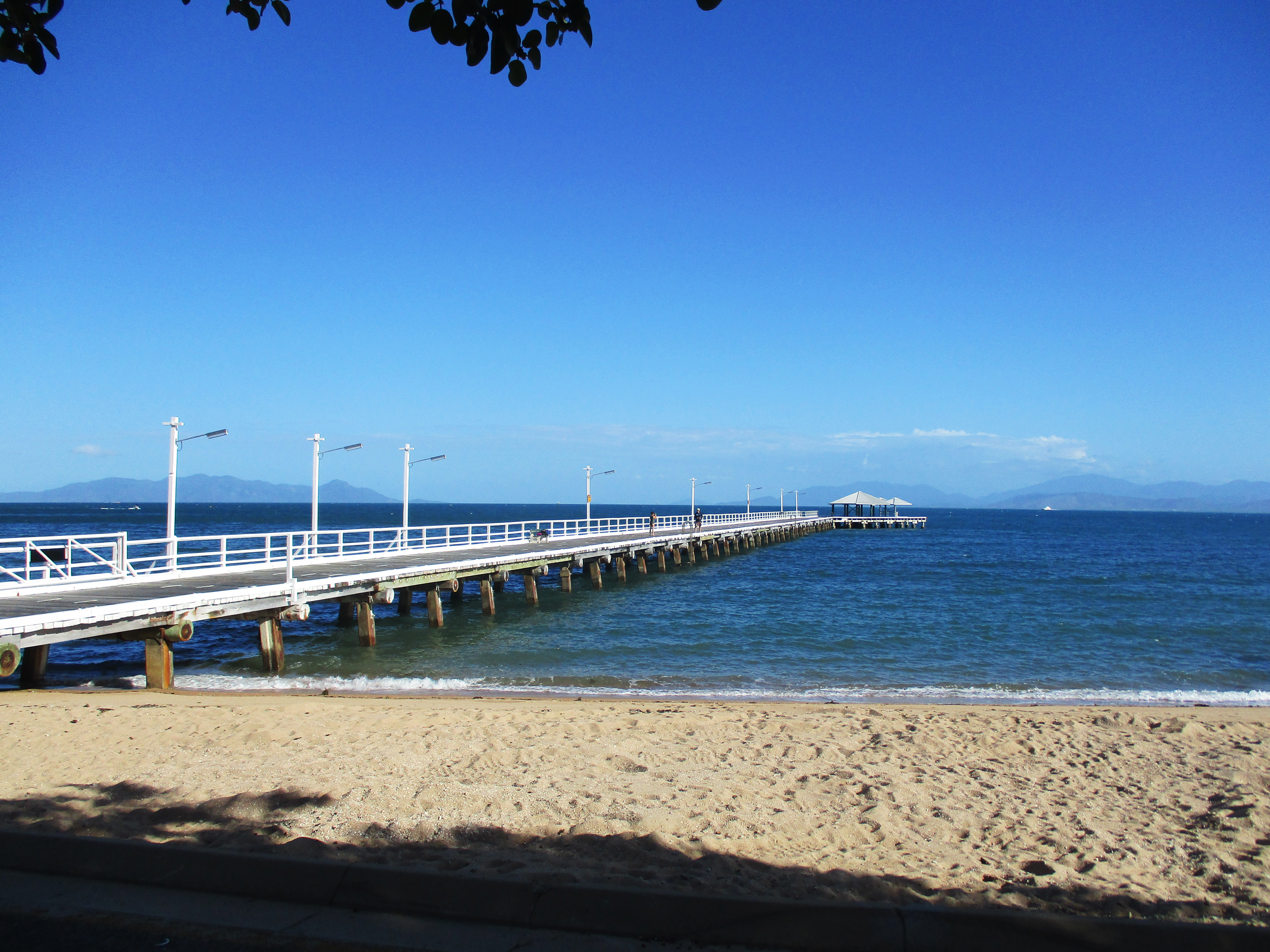
The Picnic Bay jetty, constructed in 1959 and used as a ferry terminal until the mid-2000s.

In 1957, a permit was issued for a construction of a new jetty in picnic bay by the Department of Harbours and Marine. Successfully completed in October 1959, the Picnic Bay Jetty was completed by John Holland using £43,000 financed by The Commonwealth Aid Marine Works Trust Fund . It was leased from 1960 to 1981 to Hayles Magnetic Island Pty Ltd. (established by Robert Hayles in 1922) who were also responsible for maintenance of the structure during the lease period.

On 1 December 1962, the Queensland Place Names Board officially gazetted the town with the name Picnic Bay which was in common use, replacing the former town name of Camoomilli. The suburb was formally named and bounded on 12 June 1992.

On Christmas Eve 1971, Magnetic Island and Townsville were struck by Cyclone Althea, While the Picnic Bay jetty remained structurally sound despite receiving some damage, serious damage was inflicted upon most buildings in the bay and foliage stripped off trees.

In 1977, a shelter was erected for passengers waiting for ferries at the end of the Picnic Bay jetty by the Townsville City Council. In 1985, the Townsville Harbour board gained approval to build a larger shelter shed on the jetty. Following the completion of Magnetic Harbour in 2003, ferry operations to the Picnic Bay jetty ceased In 2020, the city council invested in new underwater lighting for the jetty.

In July 2022, Maggie Island Brewery opened.

== Demographics ==
In the 2006 census, the town of Picnic Bay had a population of 360 people.

In the 2016 census, the suburb of Picnic Bay had a population of 291 people.

In the 2021 census, the suburb of Picnic Bay had a population of 367 people.

== Heritage listings ==
Picnic Bay has a number of heritage-listed sites, including:

- Picnic Bay Jetty, Esplanade (19.1809°S 146.8386°E)
- former Picnic Bay State School, Granite Street (19.177°S 146.8395°E)

== Transport ==
Picnic Bay is connected to the other bays of Magnetic Island by road. It is connected to the island's eastern towns by Nelly Bay Road, which climbs Hawkings Point from the northeastern corner of the bay, east over the point where it follows the coastline down into Nelly Bay. It is also connected to the western towns, Cockle Bay and West Point, by partially sealed West Point Road, which starts at the end of Yule Street in the northwestern corner of the bay.

The town is serviced by Magnetic Island Bus Service, which runs regular services to coincide with Ferry arrivals and departures at the Nelly Bay Ferry Terminal. The foreshore bus stop, which is located at the base of the Picnic Bay Jetty is the terminus for bus services which run from Horseshoe Bay, via Arcadia and Nelly Bay. Picnic Bay is also serviced by a number of vehicle hire companies operate in Picnic Bay and Nelly Bay which allow tourists to hire vehicles for use on the Island's road network. Use of hire vehicles on West Point Road is discouraged by vehicle hire companies due to a large portion of the road being unsealed and impassible in most vehicles.

== Education ==
There are no schools in Picnic Bay. The nearest government primary school is Magnetic Island State School in Nelly Bay on the island. The nearest government secondary school is Townsville State High School in Railway Estate on the Townsville mainland.

== Amenities ==
The town of Picnic Bay features an open-air shopping complex, The Picnic Bay Mall, and a patrolled beach along the waterfront.

The town also has the Magnetic Island Golf Course (19.1741°S 146.8353°E) and the Magnetic Island Police Station (19.1774°S 146.8393°E).

== Attractions ==
Off the coast the wreck of the George Rennie is visible at low tide (19.1809°S 146.8338°E).

Maggie Island Brewery is a craft brewery in the Seasalt Arcade on the Esplanade.
