= West Point, Queensland =

West Point Magnetic Island, Queensland
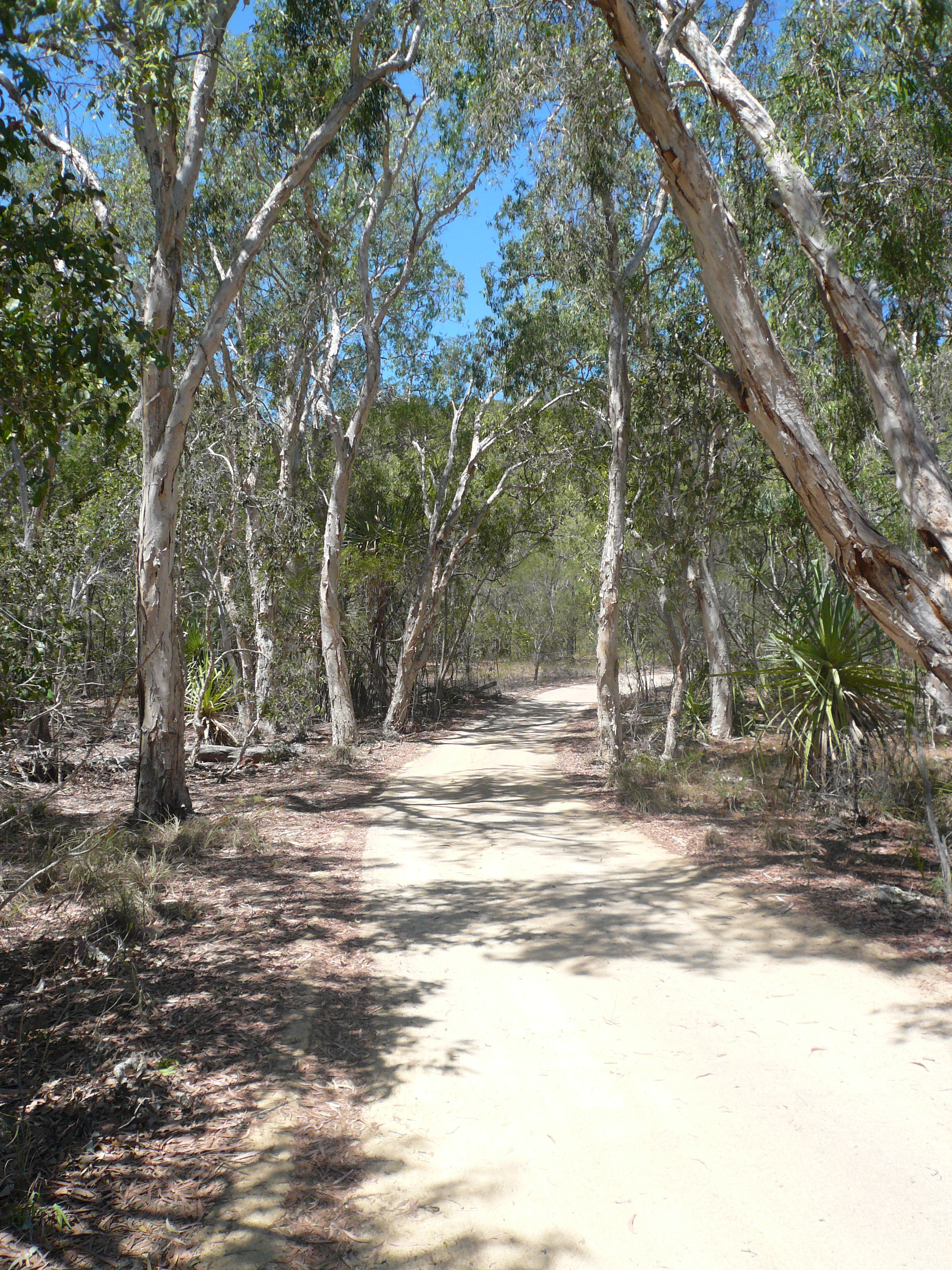
- Road to West Point, 2009

- Coordinates: 19.1330°S 146.7830°E
- Population: 32 (2021 census)
  - Density: 1.290/km^{2} (3.34/sq mi)
- Postcode(s): 4819
- Area: 24.8 km^{2} (9.6 sq mi)
- Time zone: AEST (UTC+10:00)
- Location: 12.3 km (8 mi) NW of Nelly Bay
- LGA(s): City of Townsville
- State electorate(s): Townsville
- Federal division(s): Herbert
Localities around West Point:
Coral Sea	Coral Sea	Horseshoe Bay
Coral Sea	West Point	Arcadia
Coral Sea	Picnic Bay	Nelly Bay

West Point is an island town and suburb of Magnetic Island in the City of Townsville, Queensland, Australia. In the 2021 census, the suburb of West Point had a population of 32 people.

== Geography ==
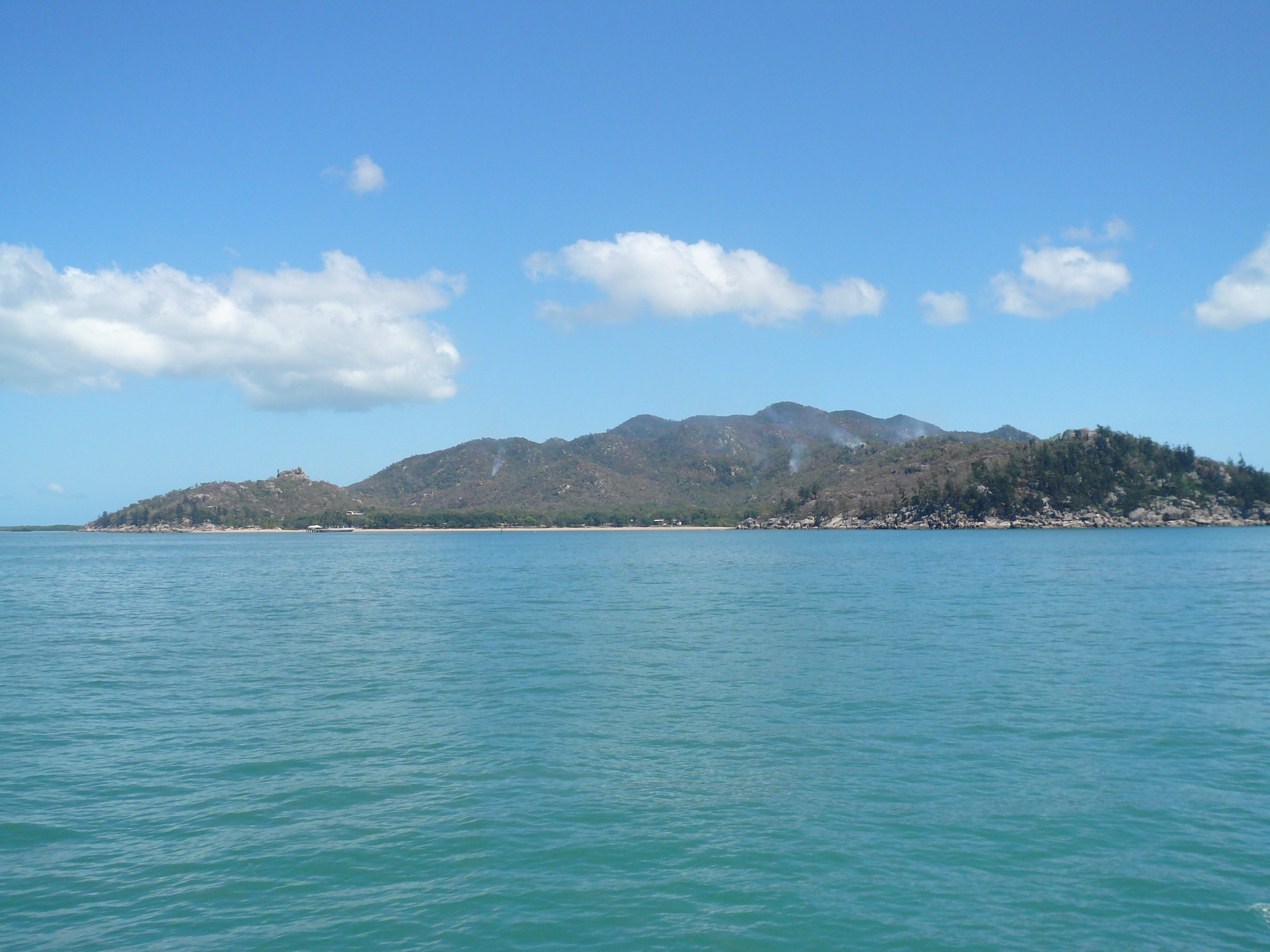
West Point from the ferry, 2009

The suburb has the following headlands:

- Liver Point (19.1155°S 146.7901°E)
- West Point (19.1286°S 146.7795°E)

The town of West Point is located south of the headland of the same name. It is accessed via West Point Road from Picnic Bay to the south.

Mount Cook is in the east of the suburb (19.1396°S 146.8295°E), rising to 493 metres (1,617 ft).

Most of the suburb is within the Magnetic Island National Park, except for the strip along the west coast of the island where the town and some other residential housing is situated, together with the Magnetic Island Conservation Park 1 and the Bolger Bay Conservation Park.

== History ==
West Point is the original site of the Magnetic Island Quarantine Station Reserve proclaimed in Queensland Government Gazette in 1886. The station was moved to Cape Pallarenda on the mainland near Townsville in 1915, creating the Cape Pallarenda Quarantine Station (now heritage-listed).

== Demographics ==
In the 2016 census, the suburb of West Point had a population of 32 people.

In the 2021 census, the suburb of West Point had a population of 32 people, unchanged from 2016.

== Education ==
There are no schools in West Point. The nearest government primary school is Magnetic Island State School in Nelly Bay on the island. The nearest government secondary school is Townsville State High School in Railway Estate in the Townsville mainland.
