= Horseshoe Bay, Queensland =

Horseshoe Bay Magnetic Island, Queensland
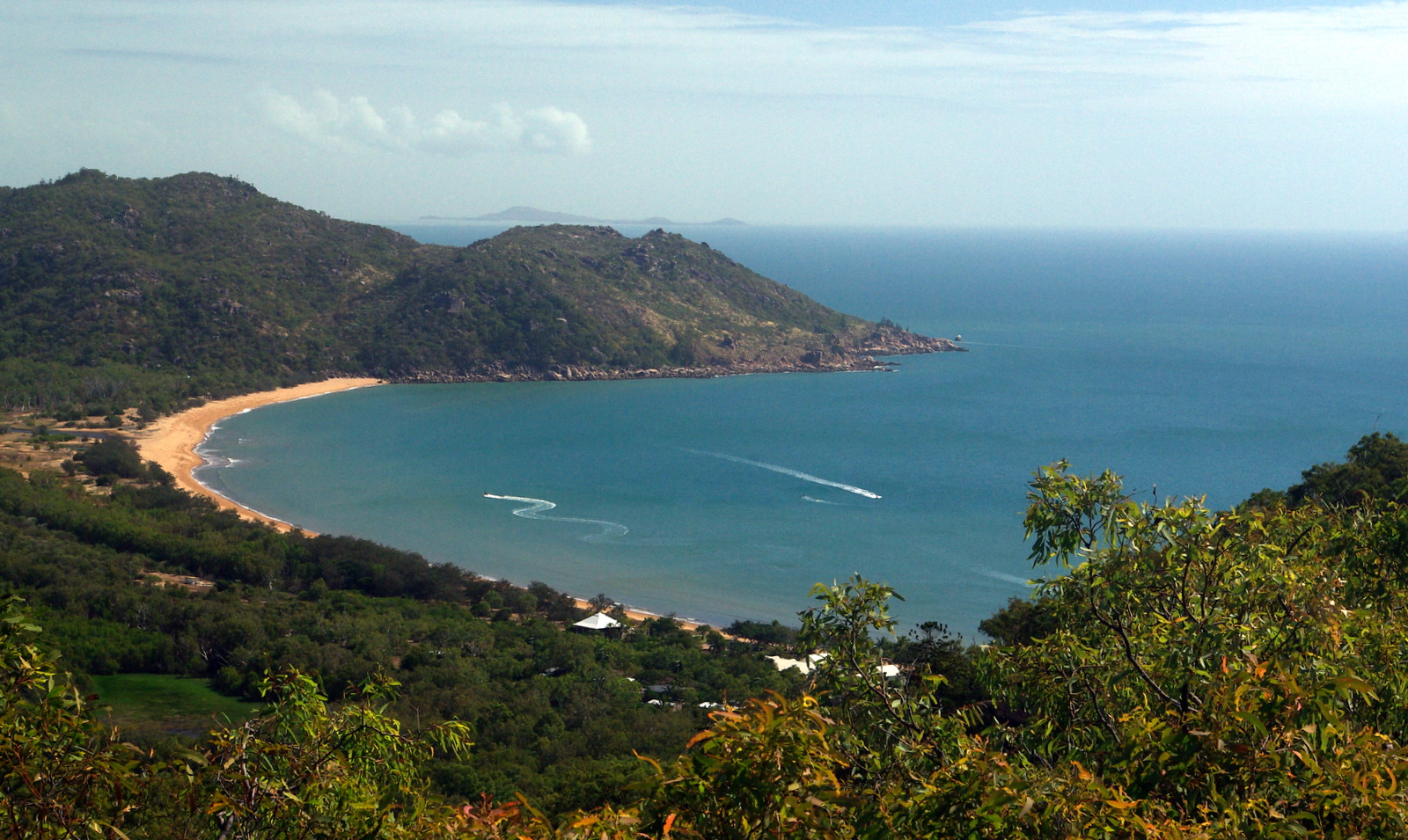
- Horseshoe Bay, seen from the top of the Forts Walk

- Coordinates: 19.1177°S 146.8602°E
- Population: 611 (2021 census)
  - Density: 98.5/km^{2} (255.2/sq mi)
- Postcode(s): 4819
- Area: 6.2 km^{2} (2.4 sq mi)
- Time zone: AEST (UTC+10:00)
- Location: 5.9 km (4 mi) NNE of Nelly Bay
- LGA(s): City of Townsville
- State electorate(s): Townsville
- Federal division(s): Herbert
Localities around Horseshoe Bay:
West Point	Coral Sea	Coral Sea
West Point	Horseshoe Bay	Florence Bay
West Point	Arcadia	Arcadia

Horseshoe Bay is a bay, town and suburb on Magnetic Island in the City of Townsville, Queensland, Australia. It is a major tourist accommodation and recreation centre on the island. In the 2021 census, the suburb of Horseshoe Bay had a population of 611 people.

== History ==
Until 1962, it was known as the town of Bee-Ran.

Horseshoe Bay Post Office opened in 1935, replacing 11 years of honorary service by a local resident. It closed in 1982.

Horseshoe Bay Provisional School opened on 1 July 1949. On 2 September 1954, it became Horseshoe Bay State School. It closed on 28 April 1972. It was located at 2 Heath Street (19.1200°S 146.8626°E).

From September 2006, Horseshoe Bay was undergoing a string of housing development behind the existing residential area to the southern part of the bay.

== Demographics ==
In the 2006 census, the town of Horseshoe Bay had a population of 484 people.

In the 2016 census, the suburb of Horseshoe Bay had a population of 578 people.

In the 2021 census, the suburb of Horseshoe Bay had a population of 611 people.

== Education ==
There are no schools in Horseshoe Bay. The nearest government primary school is Magnetic Island State School in Nelly Bay on the island. The nearest government secondary school is Townsville State High School in Railway Estate in the Townsville mainland.

== Amenities ==
There are a number of parks in the area, including:

- Apjohn Street Park (19.1253°S 146.8638°E)
- Health Street Park (19.1191°S 146.8620°E)
- Pollard Street Park (19.1169°S 146.8420°E)

There is a boat ramp at the intersection of Horseshoe Bay Road and Pacific Drive (19.1175°S 146.8603°E). It is managed by the Townsville City Council.

== Gallery ==
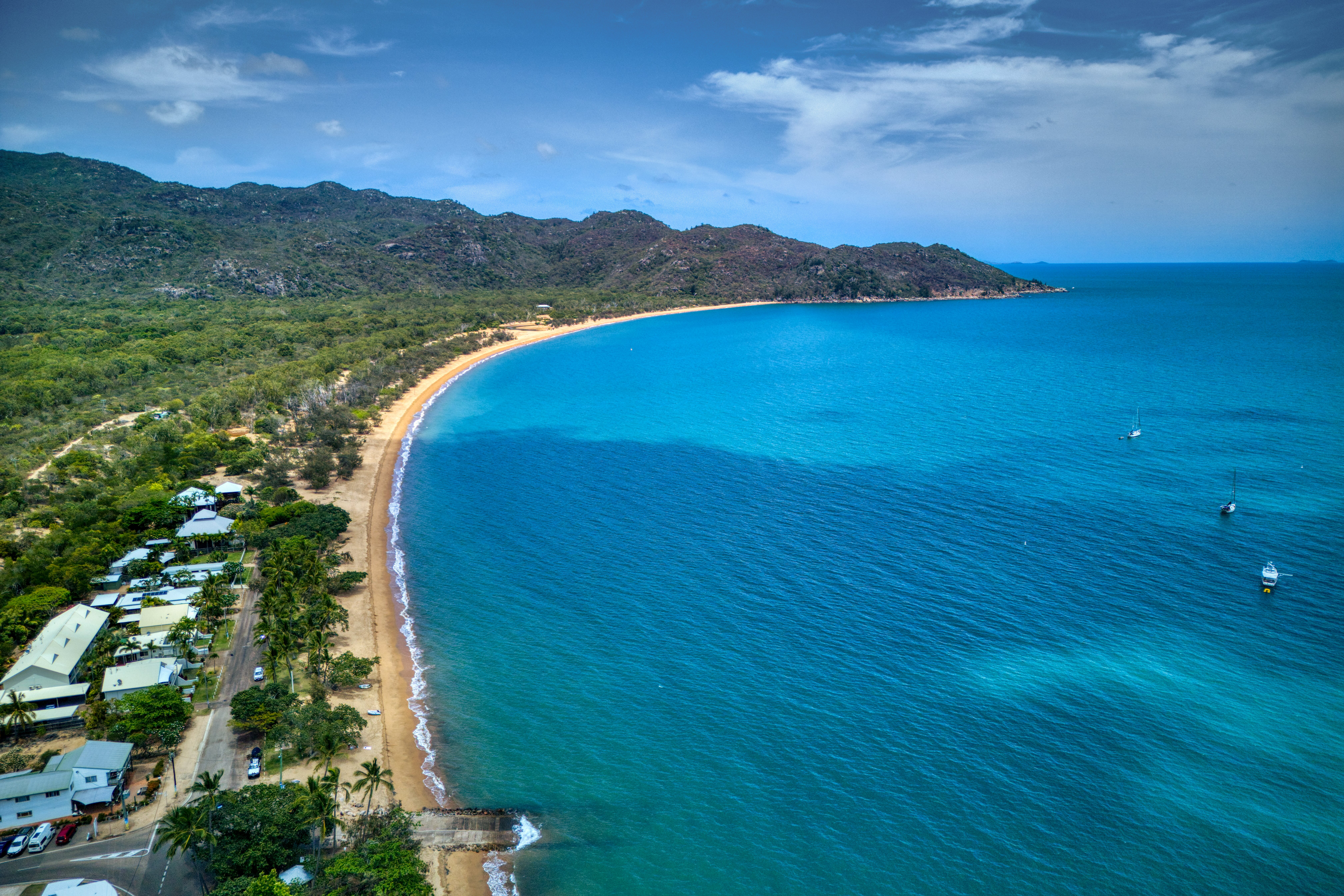

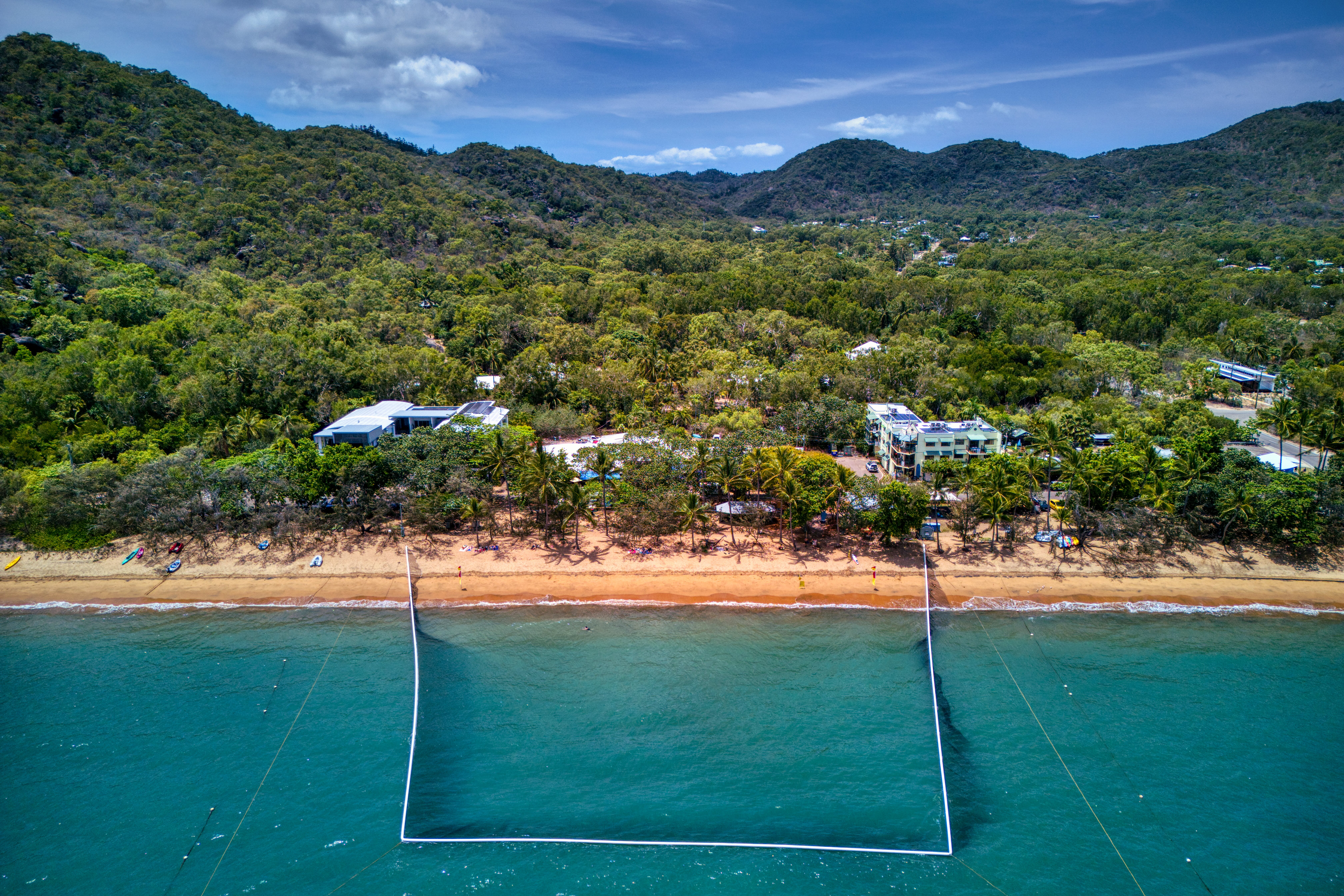

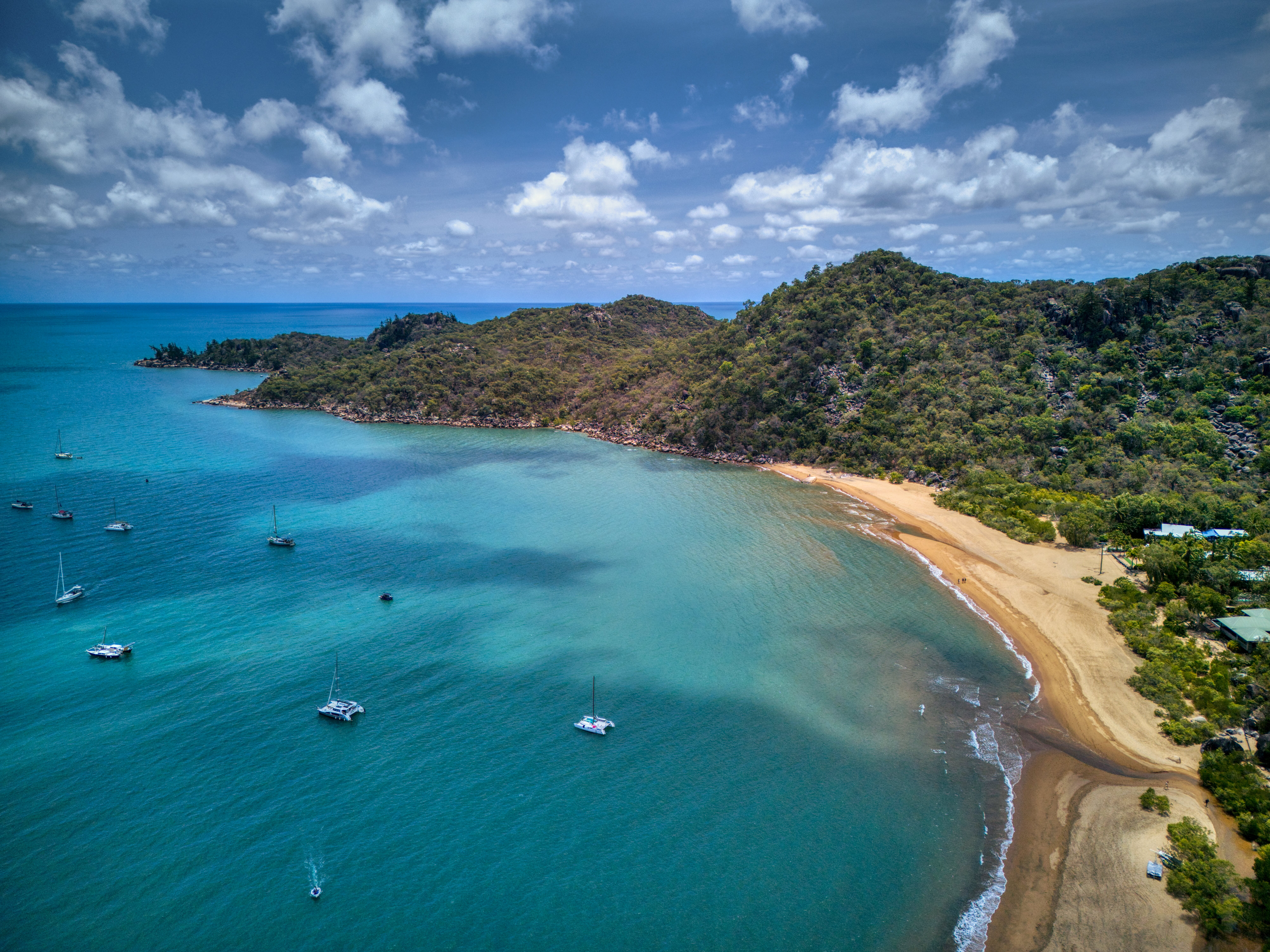
