= County of Elphinstone =

Elphinstone Queensland
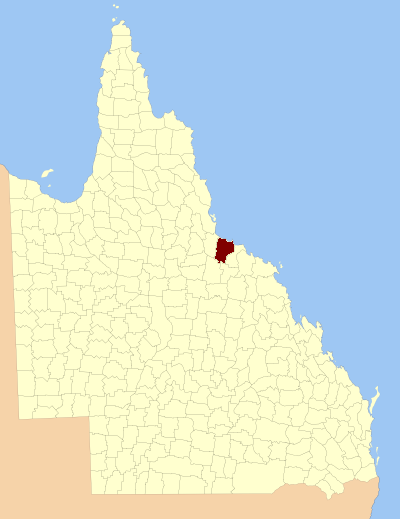
- Location within Queensland
Lands administrative divisions around Elphinstone:
Wilkie Gray	Pacific Ocean	Pacific Ocean
Wilkie Gray	Elphinstone	Gladstone
Davenport	Davenport	Murray

The County of Elphinstone is a cadastral division of Queensland which contains the city of Townsville. It was named after George Elphinstone Dalrymple (1826–1876), a politician and explorer. The county is divided into civil parishes. Townsville is mentioned as being in the county of Elphinstone in the 1911 Britannica. It is bounded by the Haughton River in the east, and part of the Burdekin River in the south-west.

== Parishes ==
Elphinstone is divided into parishes, listed as follows:

Parish	LGA	Coordinates	Towns
Abbotsford	Burdekin	19°27′S 147°03′E	Cungulla
Beor	Townsville	19°22′S 146°52′E	Oonoonba
Bohle	Townsville	19°15′S 146°40′E	Deeragun
Cardington	Charters Towers	19°49′S 146°48′E	
Coonambelah	Townsville	19°14′S 146°47′E	Townsville, Kirwan, Pallarenda
Crimea	Charters Towers	19°45′S 146°40′E	
Cunningham	Charters Towers	19°54′S 146°44′E	Mingela
Ettrick	Townsville	19°19′S 147°00′E	
Glenrock	Townsville	19°37′S 146°38′E	
Granite	Townsville	19°30′S 146°37′E	
Halifax	Townsville	19°13′S 146°33′E	Bluewater
Hervey	Townsville	19°21′S 146°30′E	
Lansdowne	Townsville	19°30′S 146°47′E	
Magenta	Townsville	19°38′S 146°52′E	Woodstock
Magnetic	Townsville	19°07′S 146°49′E	Magnetic Island
Rokeby	Townsville	19°32′S 146°56′E	
Ross	Townsville	19°23′S 146°40′E	Alice River, Kelso
Scott	Burdekin	19°34′S 147°03′E	Giru
Stuart	Townsville	19°22′S 146°48′E	Stuart, Annandale, Douglas
Woodstock	Townsville	19°42′S 146°59′E	
Wyoming	Townsville	19°38′S 146°47′E	
