= Townsville State High School =

Location
- 36 Boundary Street; Railway Estate, 4812; Australia
- Coordinates: 19.2730°S 146.8111°E

Information
- Type: State secondary day school
- Motto: Latin: In Meliora Contende (Strive for better things)
- Established: 1924
- Principal: Murray James
- Years: Year 7 – Year 12
- Gender: Coeducational
- Enrolment: 850 (August 2024)
- Language: English
- Houses: Warrior, Faraday, Brewer, Needle
- Colours: Blue, yellow, red, green (In order of above)
- Website: townsvilleshs.eq.edu.au

Townsville State High School, also colloquially known as Town High, is a secondary school in Railway Estate, Townsville (Queensland, Australia), an area administered by Townsville City Council.

== History ==
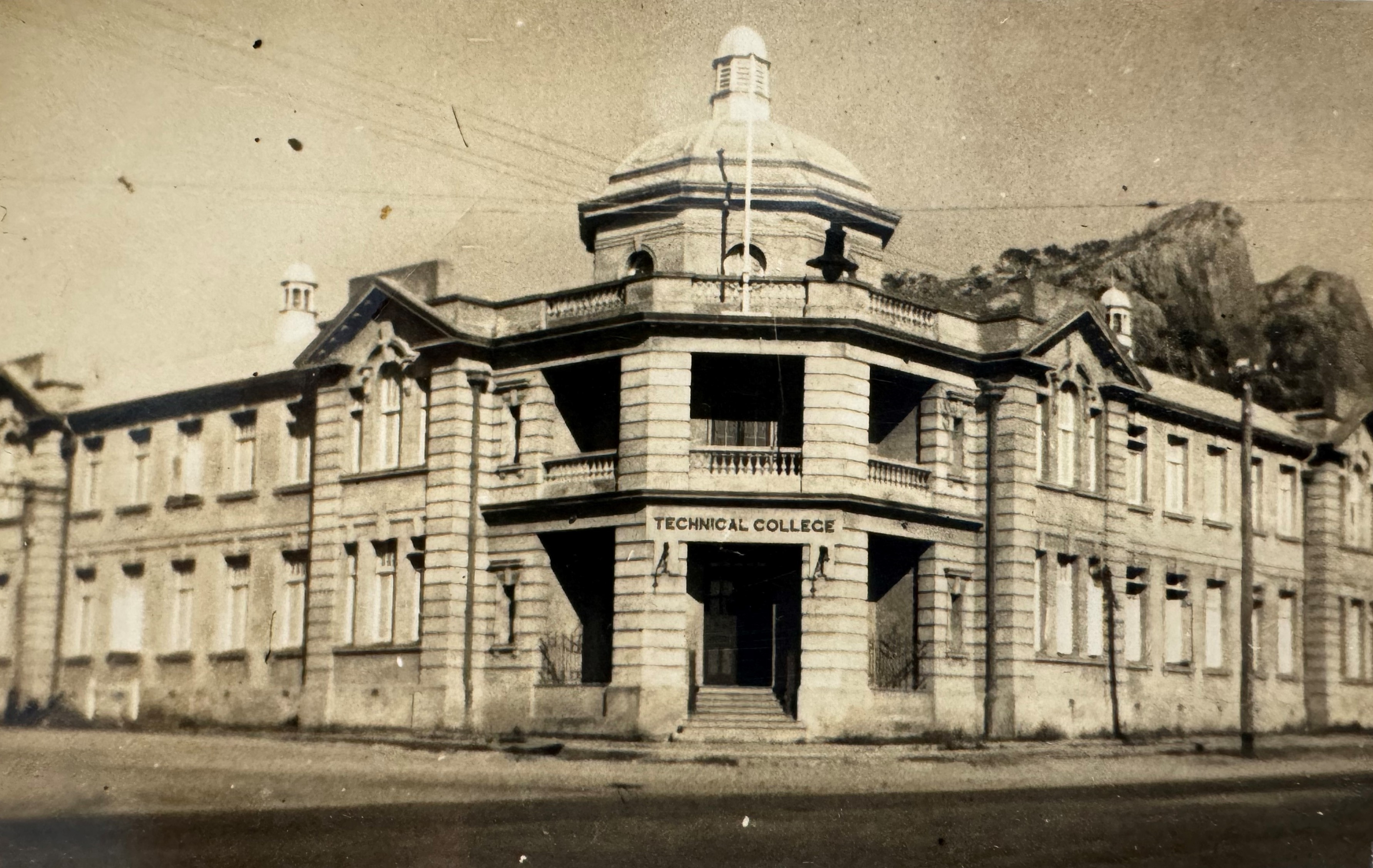
Townsville Technical College - Front view (Stanley Street, Townsville)

Townsville State High School was established in 7 July 1924 as part of the Townsville Technical College (TAFE) at the northwest corner of Stanley and Walker Streets in Townsville's central business district.

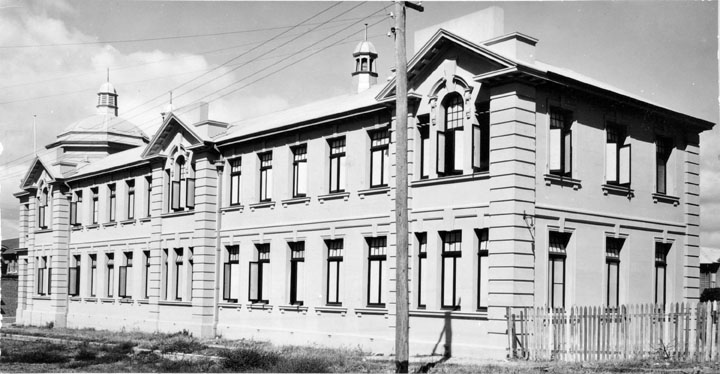
Townsville Technical College - Side view (Stanley Street, Townsville)

In 1965, the High School was re-located to its current Railway Estate address, the site of the then recently established Ross River State High School, with Ross River students being incorporated into the Townsville State High School student records. The old vacated central business district site became a campus of the TAFE. The transition between the two locations lasted 2 years (1964–1966).

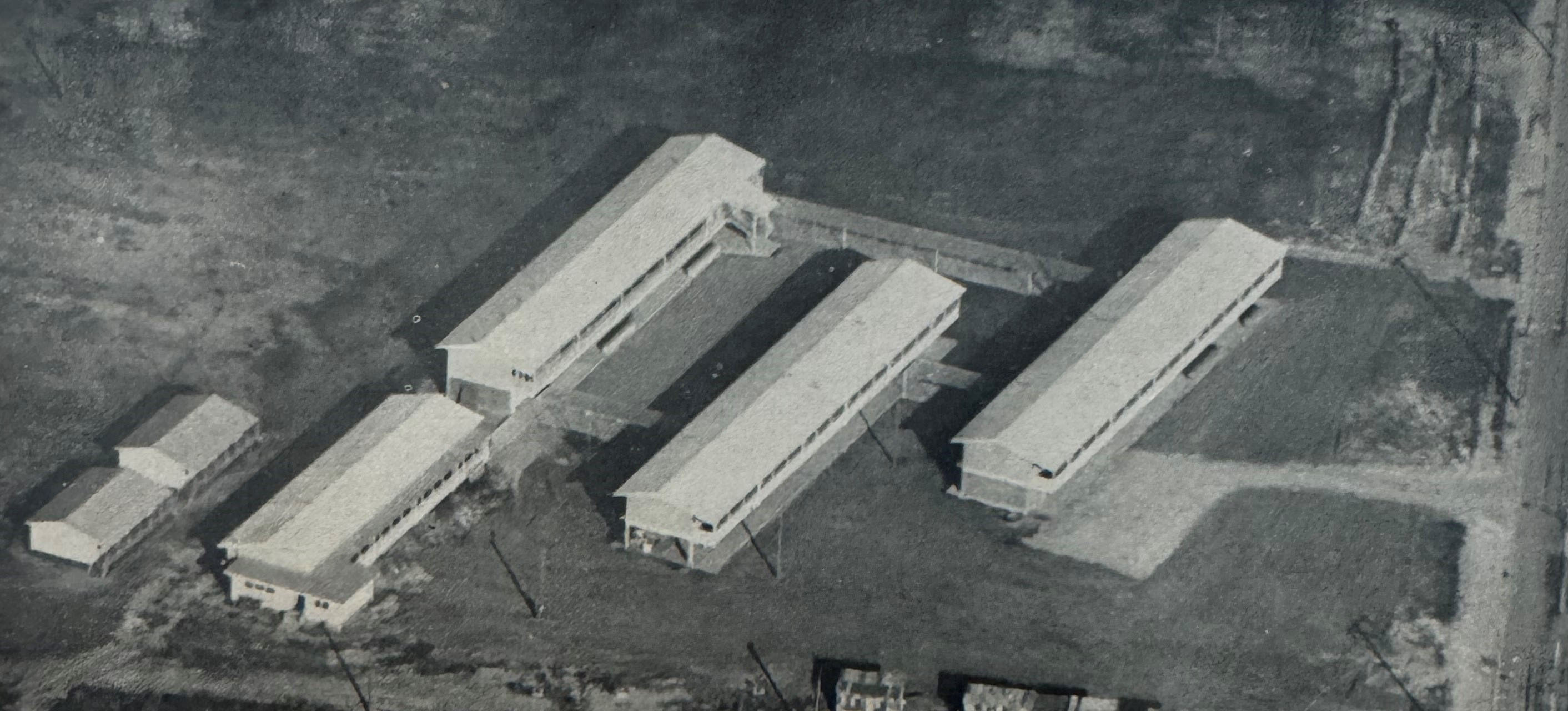
Townsville State High School (Current South Townsville location) in 1965

== Leadership ==
=== Principals ===
The principals of Townsville State High School have included:

Summary of Principals
| Tenure | | Principal | Subsequent Role | Ref |
| Initial year | Final year | Principal | Subsequent Role | Ref |
|---|---|---|---|---|
| January 2024 | Current | Murray I. James | | |
| September 2023 | January 2024 | Tanya Nelson (Stand in) | | |
| October 2015 | September 2023 | Robert J. Slater | Spinifex State College and then William Ross State High School | |
| January 2014 | September 2015 | Francis Greene (Acting) | Retired | |
| July 2012 | December 2013 | Scott J. Stewart | Member for Townsville | |
| February 2012 | July 2012 | Kaylene M. Mladenovic (Acting) | | |
| January 2007 | February 2012 | Scott J. Stewart | Member for Townsville | |
| April 2006 | December 2006 | Walter Mark (acting) | | |
| January 2003 | April 2006 | Ian Smythe | Chief Executive for Townsville Crocodiles | |
| January 1989 | December 2002 | William H.L. Sperring | | |
| January 1987 | December 1988 | Robert G. Guthrie | | |
| January 1979 | December 1986 | Barry L. Molloy | | |
| July 1977 | December 1978 | John J. O’Brien | | |
| February 1977 | June 1977 | Daryl J. Hanly (Acting) | | |
| January 1967 | December 1970 | Percy C. Proctor | | |
| August 1966 | December 1966 | Neville J. Corfield (Acting) | | |
| January 1965 | August 1966 | Trevor C. Baker-Funch | | |
| January 1964 | December 1964 | Eric K. Haughton | | |
City to South Townsville Relocation
| January 1964 | December 1964 | George R. Herring (Ross River State High School's year 8 only) | | |
| January 1962 | December 1963 | Gavin Semple | | |
| January 1958 | December 1961 | Victor G. Honour | | |
| January 1955 | December 1957 | Cecil R. Roberts | | |
| January 1948 | December 1954 | Eric G. Gee | | |
| July 1945 | December 1947 | Frederick H. Cafferky | | |
| January 1944 | June 1945 | S. Hosking (Acting) | | |
| January 1938 | December 1943 | William A. Viggers | | |
| July 1924 | December 1937 | David C. Hamilton | | |

== Students ==
=== Enrolments ===
Student enrolment trends
| Year | Years | | | | | | Boys | Girls | Total | Ref |
| Year | 7 | 8 | 9 | 10 | 11 | 12 | Boys | Girls | Total | Ref |
|---|---|---|---|---|---|---|---|---|---|---|
| 2010 | - | - | - | - | - | - | 369 | 296 | 665 | |
| 2011 | - | - | - | - | - | - | 359 | 275 | 634 | |
| 2012 | - | - | - | - | - | - | 363 | 272 | 635 | |
| 2013 | - | - | - | - | - | - | 386 | 288 | 674 | |
| 2014 | - | - | - | - | - | - | 382 | 287 | 669 | |
| 2015 | - | - | - | - | - | - | 434 | 318 | 752 | |
| 2016 | - | - | - | - | - | - | 413 | 314 | 727 | |
| 2017 | - | - | - | - | - | - | 443 | 316 | 759 | |
| 2018 | 158 | 151 | 147 | 157 | 75 | 100 | 452 | 338 | 790 | |
| 2019 | 151 | 155 | 144 | 150 | 128 | 70 | 448 | 350 | 798 | |
| 2020 | 108 | 150 | 171 | 160 | 125 | 108 | 482 | 400 | 882 | |
| 2021 | 127 | 166 | 144 | 153 | 131 | 102 | 451 | 372 | 823 | |
| 2022 | 126 | 125 | 167 | 147 | 107 | 112 | 430 | 354 | 784 | |
| 2023 | 124 | 137 | 144 | 161 | 117 | 84 | 427 | 350 | 777 | |
| 2024 | 161 | 139 | 145 | 167 | 167 | 105 | 456 | 394 | 850 | |
| 2025 | TBA | TBA | TBA | TBA | TBA | TBA | TBA | TBA | TBA | |

== Sports ==
=== Sporting Houses ===
There are currently four houses at the school named after reefs off the Queensland coast:

Sports Houses
| House | Colour |
|---|---|
| Warrior | Blue |
| Faraday | Yellow |
| Brewer | Red |
| Needle | Green |

In previous years, there were two additional houses; "Keeper" and "Centipede". House colours changed commonly at that point.

=== Programs ===
Town High is known for its Basketball program called the Town High Tropics. Town High has been involved in many programs such as jump rope for heart, Clean Up Australia day, Optiminds, Young Diplomats Program, ANZAC day march, Shave for a Cure, New Zealand ski trip, star struck, Inspiring Young Australians, CREST, Japan tour and hosting with the sister school Matsudo Mabashi as well as an "Energy Farm" that helps supply energy to the library. Town High also has an extensive science program and a vertical curriculum allowing students to undertake subjects above their year level at their knowledge level.

== Notable alumni ==
- Julian Assange, WikiLeaks co-founder, attended Townsville State High School.

== See also ==
- Education in Queensland
- History of state education in Queensland
- List of schools in Greater Brisbane
- List of schools in Queensland
- Lists of schools in Australia
