= Chance =

Chance may refer to:

== Mathematics ==
- In mathematics, likelihood of something (by way of the likelihood function or probability density function)
- Chance (statistics magazine)

== Places ==
- Chance, Kentucky, US
- Chance, Maryland, US
- Chance, Oklahoma, US
- Chance, South Dakota, US
- Chance, Virginia, US
- Chancé, a commune in Brittany, France

== People ==
- Chance (name), a given name and surname
- Chance the Rapper (born 1993), Chicago hip hop recording artist
- Kamal Givens or Chance (born 1981), American rapper and reality-show contestant
- Chancellor, formerly Chance (born 1986), American singer-songwriter and record producer

== Arts and entertainment ==
=== Film and television ===
- Chance (1984 film), a Russian science fiction comedy film
- Chance (1990 film), an action film starring Lawrence Hilton-Jacobs and Dan Haggerty
- Chance (2002 film), directed by and starring Amber Benson
- Chance (2009 film), directed by Abner Benaim
- Chance (2020 film), starring Matthew Modine
- "Chance" (Fear Itself), a TV series episode
- Chance (TV series), a 2016 American thriller/drama television series

=== Music ===
==== Groups and labels ====
- Chance (band), an American country music group
- Chance Records, an American record label

==== Albums ====
- Chance (Candi Staton album), 1979
- Chance (Manfred Mann's Earth Band album), 1980

==== Songs ====
- "Chance" (Act song), 1988
- "Chance" (Big Country song), 1983
- "Chance!" (Koharu Kusumi song), 2007
- "Chance" (Miho Komatsu song), 1998
- "Chance" (Savatage song), 1994
- "Chance" (Sylvie Vartan song), 1963
- "Chance", by DC Talk from Intermission: the Greatest Hits, 2000
- "Chance", by Hayley Kiyoko from Panorama, 2022
- "Chance", by @onefive from Classy Crush, 2024
- "Chance", by S.E.S. from A Letter from Greenland, 2000
- "Chance!", by Uverworld from Timeless, 2006
- "Chance!", by Yui Asaka, 1990
- "A Chance", by Kenny Chesney, 1997

=== Other arts and entertainment ===
- Chance (Conrad novel), a 1913 novel by Joseph Conrad
- Chance (Parker novel), a 1996 novel by Robert B. Parker
- Chance (comics), two different characters from the Marvel Comics universe
- Chance, a space in the game Monopoly
- Life (video games), also sometimes called a chance

== Other uses ==
- Chance (philosophy) or indeterminism
- Chance (baseball), a defensive statistic
- Chance (ship), a number of ships of this name
- Chance, a Brahman bull that was cloned, producing Second Chance in 1999
- Chance Brothers, English glass company
- Chance Rides, American amusement park ride and roller coaster manufacturer
- Optima Bus Corporation, formerly Chance Coach, Inc.

== See also ==
- Chances (disambiguation)
- Second Chance (disambiguation)
- Second Chances (disambiguation)
