= Out on a Limb =

Out on a Limb may refer to:

- Risk-taking
- Out on a Limb (book), a 1983 autobiography by Shirley MacLaine

== Film and television ==
- Out on a Limb (1950 film), a Walt Disney animated short starring Chip 'n' Dale and Donald Duck
- Out on a Limb (1992 film), an American comedy starring Matthew Broderick
- Out on a Limb, a 2005 film featuring Neil Stuke
- Out on a Limb, a 1987 American TV miniseries based on the book by, and starring, Shirley MacLaine
- "Out on a Limb" (Arrested Development), a 2005 television episode
- "Out on a Limb" (ER), a 2006 television episode
- "Out on a Limb" (Frankie Drake Mysteries), a 2019 television episode
- "Out on a Limb" (Happy Tree Friends), a 2003 animated web series episode

== Music ==
- Out on a Limb Records, an Irish record label
- Out on a Limb (album), by Pete Rugolo and His All-stars, 1957
- Out on a Limb with Clark Terry, an album by Clark Terry, 1958
- Out on a Limb, an album by Janet Panic, 2010
- Out on a Limb, an album by Rena Gaile, 1995
- "Out on a Limb", a song by Mr FijiWiji, 2014
- "Out on a Limb", a song by Teena Marie from Starchild, 1984

== See also ==
- Chance (disambiguation)
