= Chayce =

Chayce is a given name. Notable people with the name include:

- Chayce Beckham (born 1996), American singer-songwriter, winner of season 19 of the talent series American Idol
- Chayce Jones (born 2000), Australian rules footballer

== See also ==
- Chance (name)
