= Chance (ship) =

Several vessels have been named Chance:

== Mercantile vessels of the Age of Sail ==
=== Chance (1786 ship) ===
Chance, a schooner of 39 tons (bm), was launched in 1786 at St John's Newfoundland. She became a Liverpool-based slave ship in the triangular trade in enslaved people. Captain Jame Millbanke sailed from Liverpool on 31 March 1787. She was condemned on the coast of Africa as unfit for service. In 1787 nine British enslaving vessels were lost, four of them on the coast.

=== Chance (1786 London ship) ===
Chance was a schooner launched in Virginia in 1779, probably under another name. From 1786 she traded between London and Africa, though she may have traded in enslaved people within African waters. A tornado on 28 March 1789 upset her. Her crew saved themselves, but abandoned her and the 33 captives onboard. By chance, another vessel later was able to rescue the 11 captives by then still alive.

=== Chance (1799 ship) ===
Chance (1799 ship) was built in India c.1799. She was captured and recaptured before being lost near Saint Mary's Bay, Madagascar in May 1799.

=== Chance (1846 barque) ===
Chance was built in Salem, Massachusetts (possibly in 1846), as North West. She was renamed Chance in 1863 when owned in Australia. From 1874 to 1876 she was an Invercargill-based whaling ship before being reduced to a coaling hulk at Bluff. She was ashore at Bluff in 1902.

== Royal Navy ==
- HMS Galgo (1799) was a Jamaican privateer that the Spanish Navy captured in 1797 and named Galgo Inglés (English greyhound), and that the British captured in November 1799. In her brief career she detained, took, or destroyed a number of small prizes before October 1800, when she foundered, with the loss of most of her crew and passengers. The Admiralty had intended to rename her HMS Chance, but she was lost before the change could take effect.
- HMS Chance (J12) was an Auk-class minesweeper launched by Associated SB, Seattle, on 27 November 1942. She was transferred to the UK on Lend Lease on 13 November 1943, where she was classified as a Catherine-class minesweeper. The UK returned her to the United States Navy in 1946, who sold her in March to the Turkish Navy, which named her Edremit. The Turkish Navy withdrew her from service in 1973.
