= As You Make Your Way =

Studio album by Marc Douglas Berardo
- Released: 2003
- Recorded: Hayloft Studios, Milford, Connecticut
- Genre: folk, singer-songwriter
- Label: Hayloft

Marc Douglas Berardo chronology
Second Chance (2000)	As You Make Your Way (2003)	Harbor (2005)

As You Make Your Way is the third studio release by Rhode Island–based singer-songwriter Marc Douglas Berardo.

In Shellie Byrum's review of the album she wrote, "It's a good feeling when music can hit on the emotions of your past, and that's what many will get from As You Make Your Way."

== Track listing ==
All songs written by Marc Douglas Berardo

1. "Today" – 4:25
2. "Untethered" – 3:25
3. "The Rum Diary" – 4:48
4. "For Real" – 4:19
5. "Just One" – 5:50
6. "On the Nights When I Can't Sleep" – 4:11
7. "Traveling" – 5:21
8. "The Story (Life After Hemingway)" 4:29
9. "Happy" – 5:44
10. "As You Make Your Way" – 4:44

== Personnel ==
=== Musicians ===
- Marc Douglas Berardo – vocals, acoustic guitar, percussion, box drum kit, harmony vocals
- Dick Neal – organ, banjo, electric slide guitar, pedal steel guitar, keyboards, piano, mandolin, Dobro
- Pete Szymanski – bass
- Nicky Vitiello – drums
- Chris Berardo – harmonica, harmony vocals, jembe, tambourine
- Chris Teskey – Squeeze box
- Choir on Just One – Mike LaSalla, Leejay, Emily Hron Weigle, Bill West, Dick Neal, Pete Symanski, and Marc Douglas Berardo

=== Production ===
- Produced by: Dick Neal
- Engineered by: Pete Szymanski
- Mixed by: Dick Neal and Marc Douglas Berardo assisted by Pete Szymanski
- Recorded by: Gene Paul at DB Plus, New York City, March 2003

=== Artwork ===
- Photography: Kim Mitchell
- Graphic Design and Layout: Chris Brown
