= Harbor (Marc Douglas Berardo album) =

Studio album by Marc Douglas Berardo
- Released: 2005
- Recorded: Circle Sessions, Stratford, Connecticut
- Genre: folk, country, singer-songwriter
- Label: Prime Numbers Recording
- Producer: Dick Neal

Marc Douglas Berardo chronology
As You Make Your Way (2003)	Harbor (2005)	Downhauler (2011)

Harbor is the fourth studio release of all original music by Rhode Island–based singer-songwriter Marc Douglas Berardo.

TheWorkingMusician.com said this in their review of Harbor. "Some writers tell a story and let the listener draw their own conclusions. Others use the plot to drive home a point. Guitarist, songwriter, singer Marc Douglas Berardo falls into the latter category."

== Track listing ==
1. "Blue Wave"
2. "Shake Out The Dust"
3. "Take It Along"
4. "Where The Road Turns to Shell and Sand"
5. "Harbor"
6. "Working"
7. "Abuse"
8. "So, Regarding Me and You"
9. "Better After All"
10. "Ricky"
11. "Trust Fund Sally"
12. "The Ghosts We Left Behind"
13. "I Will See You in My Dreams"

== Personnel ==
=== Musicians ===
- Marc Douglas Berardo – vocals, acoustic guitar, harmonies
- Dick Neal – banjo, electric guitar, organ, mandolin, Pedal steel guitar, Wurlitzer electric piano, piano, Classical guitar, Twelve-string guitar, percussion
- Steve Combs – electric and acoustic Bass guitar
- Chris Berardo – percussion, box drum kit, harmony vocals
- Liam Bailey – electric guitar, piano, resonator guitar, mandolin, fiddle
- Mark Mirando – acoustic piano
- Larry Deming – viola, violin
- Susan Spalding – french horn

=== Production ===
- Produced by: Dick Neal
- Mixed by: Dick Neal assisted by Pete Szymanski April 2005 to August 2005
- Recorded by: Michael Branden at Hayloft Studios, Milford, Connecticut
- Mastered by: Gene Paul at DB Plust Digital Services, New York City, October 2005

=== Artwork ===
- Photography: Kim Mitchell
- Graphic Design and Layout: Chris Brown
