= Marc Douglas Berardo =

American singer-songwriter

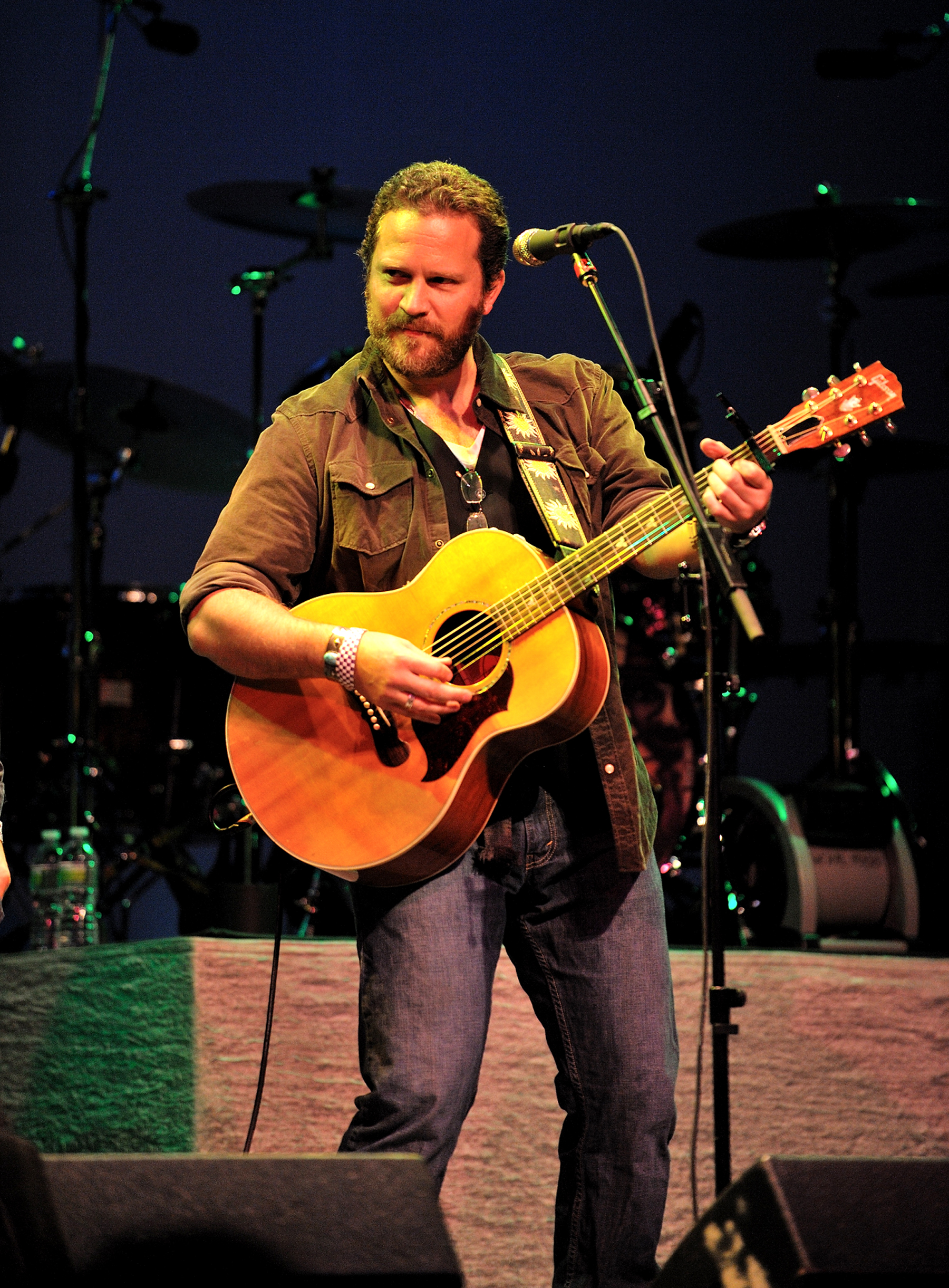

Background information
- Also known as: MDB
- Born: Marc Douglas Berardo; 1969 (age 56–57)
- Origin: Westchester County, New York
- Genres: Americana, Folk, singer-songwriter, Country, Folk-rock, Acoustic
- Occupations: Songwriter, musician, performer
- Instruments: Vocals, Guitar
- Years active: 1985–present
- Labels: Hayloft Records, Prime Numbers Recordings, Horizon Music Group, Milo Productions, Trespass Music
- Website: marcdouglas.com

Marc Douglas Berardo is an American singer-songwriter. He was born in Port Chester, New York, and raised in Rye, New York. He currently resides in Westerly, Rhode Island.

Berardo's songwriting has been compared to that of John Prine, James Taylor and Jackson Browne and an acoustic Bruce Springsteen. Berardo has been referred to as a possessing a "lonesome, clear voice easily carries an aching beauty" as well displaying musicianship with "fluid, melodic string arrangements based on his acoustic guitar". About Berardo's 2013 release, Whalebone, John Apice wrote in No Depression, "The performances are sincere, fluid, charming and above all gripping".

Videos from singles released in 2022 and 2023, The Hard Part (2022), Waiting on A Brand New Day (2022), and Letting You Blow Away (2023) were premiered by Americana Highways.

== Recognition ==
Berardo has been recognized in national song contests and showcases. He was awarded the 2014 Michael Terry People's Choice Award at the Wildflower! Arts and Music Festival Performing Songwriter Contest.

Berardo was also finalist in the 2015 South Florida Folk Festival Songwriting Competition, the 2014 Grassy Hill Kerrville New Folk Songwriting Competition at the Kerrville Folk Festival, the 2014 SolarFest Songwriter Showcase, and the 2010 Sisters Folk Festival.

== Radio ==
Quiet Places (featuring Red Molly) Passing Through and Ruby from the Downhauler CD made the FOLKDJ-L radio list of Top Albums and Songs of April 2011. My Mistakes (co-written with Abbie Gardner of Red Molly and My Friend from Whalebone made the Folk DJ radio list of the Top Folk Albums, Songs, Artists and Labels of September 2013. The Beauty Of This Now released in 2024 made Folk Alliance International Folk Chart for June 2024. SiriusXM Program Director and on-air host of The Village (Sirius XM) Mary Sue Twohy included Downhauler on her 2011 list of favorite soundtracks. SiriusXM added The Hard Part single and songs from The Beauty Of This Now to rotation. In September 2015, Mary Sue hosted Berardo on The Village Folk show that she later featured on a rebroadcast of 2015 listener favorites. Berardo was also a guest on Berardo Folk Music with Gene Shay.

== Touring ==
As a working musician, Berardo tours year-round. He has shared stages with a number of well recognized artists and performers including: The Doobie Brothers; John Haitt; Red Molly, Livingston Taylor, Cliff Eberhardt, Kevin Welch, Guy Clark, The Pousette-Dart Band and Jimmy LaFave. Berardo performed in the round at the Bluebird Café in Nashville, TN.

== Discography ==
=== Albums ===
- Further On Tomorrow, Hayloft Records, 1998
- Second Chance, Hayloft Records, 2000
- As You Make Your Way, Hayloft Records, 2003
- Harbor, Prime Numbers Recordings, 2005
- Downhauler, Horizon Music Group, 2011
- Whalebone, Milo Productions, 2013
- The Beauty Of This Now, SHC Music Tribe, 2024

=== Singles ===
- The Hard Part, 2022
- Waiting On A Brand New Day2022
- Letting You Blow Away2023
