= Chances =

Chances may refer to:

== Film and TV ==
- Chances (film), a 1931 American Pre-Code war drama
- Chances (TV series), an Australian soap opera
- Chances (Philippine TV series), a prime-time soap opera
- Chances: The Women of Magdalene, a 2006 documentary film

== Music ==
=== Albums and EPs ===
- Chances (Jill Barber album), 2008
- Chances, EP by Luke Marzec, 2018
- Chances (Sylver album), 2001

=== Songs ===
- "Chances", song by Athlete from Tourist, 2005
  - Covered by Westlife on Gravity, 2010
- "Chances" (Backstreet Boys song), 2018
- "Chances", song by Dido from the album Still on My Mind, 2019
- "Chances" (Five for Fighting song), 2009
- "Chances" (Roxette song), 1988

== Other uses ==
- Chances (novel), a 1981 novel by Jackie Collins
- The Chances, a 1617 play by John Fletcher

== See also ==
- Chances Peak, a point of the stratovolcano Soufrière Hills
- Chance (disambiguation)
- Total chances, a baseball statistic
