= Whalebone (album) =

Studio album by Marc Douglas Berardo
- Released: 2013
- Recorded: February through April 2013
- Studio: Mark Dann Recording New York City, Circle Sound Studios, Stratford, Connecticut
- Genre: Folk, country, singer-songwriter
- Label: Milo Productions
- Producer: Chris Berardo

Marc Douglas Berardo chronology
Downhauler (2011)	Whalebone (2013)

Whalebone is the sixth studio release Marc Douglas Berardo. All songs were written by Berardo except "My Mistakes", which was co-written with Abbie Gardner of Red Molly, and "Silvermine Daydreamin'", which was written by Chris Berardo.

John Apice from No Depression called it "a highly polished personal collection in the tradition of many clever songwriters of the past that forged songs like short stories."

== Track listing ==
1. "Don't Wait For Me (Slow You Down)"
2. "Sorting Out What Happened in the Night)"
3. "You Are Already Gone"
4. "Hotel on the Bay"
5. "My Mistakes"
6. "With Every Passing Day"
7. "My Friend"
8. "Silvermine Daydreamin'"
9. "Our Troubles"
10. "This is What I Call Fun"
11. "Lightning"
12. "It's Love"
13. "Wherever I Go"
14. "Another Song"

== Personnel ==
=== Musicians ===
- Marc Douglas Berardo – vocals, background vocals, guitar, percussion, Lincoln Schleifler-Bass
- Dick Neal – electric guitars
- Paulie Triff – drums
- Arturo Baguer – upright bass
- Craig Aiken – bass
- Jordan Jancz – bass
- Liam Bailey – banjo, fiddles
- Chris Berardo – vocals, harmonica, tambourine, percussion, background vocals, scat vocals, harmony vocals, shaker, block
- John Juxo – accordion, organ, keyboard, piano, Rhodes piano
- Abbie Gardner – lap steel guitar, Dobro, vocals, background vocals
- Jon Pousette-Dart of the Pousette-Dart Band – electric guitar

=== Production ===
- Produced by: Chris Berardo
- Recorded by: Mark Dann Recording. Additional recording in Stratford, Connecticut
- Mixed by: Dick Neal and Chris Berardo
- Mastered by: Mark Dann New York City March 2013

=== Artwork ===
- Photography: Kim Mitchell
- Whale Bone Drawing – Leslie Bender
- Graphic Design and Layout: Marc Douglas Berardo and Chris Brown
