= List of shipwrecks in 1902 =

The list of shipwrecks in 1902 includes ships sunk, foundered, grounded, or otherwise lost during 1902.

table of contents
1902
Jan	Feb	Mar	Apr
May	Jun	Jul	Aug
Sep	Oct	Nov	Dec
Unknown date

== January ==
=== 2 January ===
List of shipwrecks: 2 January 1902
Ship	State	Description
Bristol	United Kingdom	During a voyage from Ladysmith, British Columbia, to the Treadwell gold mine in the District of Alaska with a cargo of coal, the 1,274-ton steamer was stranded on a reef in Chatham Strait off Grey Island, north of Dundas Island on the coast of British Columbia, during a gale. She slid off the reef and sank in 204 feet (62 m) of water on the morning of 3 January with the loss of seven lives. There were 21 survivors.
Marie Cooper	United States	The motor schooner was destroyed by fire in Mississippi Sound.
Walla Walla	United States	The steamer was sunk in a collision with the barque Max (France) 11 miles (18 km) north of Cape Mendocino, California. 20 passengers and 16 crewmen killed.

=== 3 January ===
List of shipwrecks: 3 January 1902
Ship	State	Description
Alert	United States	The steamer damaged her propeller and tail shaft when she struck a submerged log while entering the harbor at Ketchikan, District of Alaska. She sank while tied up at a dock overnight. She was raised and repaired.
Sparta	United States	The fishing steamer sprung a leak in the Atlantic Ocean off Atlantic City, New Jersey and was abandoned. Her crew were rescued by the steamer Eldorado (United States).

=== 4 January ===
List of shipwrecks: 4 January 1902
Ship	State	Description
Alfonso	United Kingdom	The steamer was sunk in a collision with Vilvela or Hullera Espanola (Spain) off Aveiro, Portugal in thick fog. Her captain was the sole survivor. He was rescued by Randolphe (Portugal). 19 crewmen killed.
Hullera Espanola	Spain	The steamer was sunk in a collision with Alfonso (United Kingdom) off Aveiro, Portugal in thick fog. One crewman killed. Survivors rescued by Randolphe (Portugal).

=== 6 January ===
List of shipwrecks: 6 January 1902
Ship	State	Description
M. W. Kelly	United States	The steamer struck an obstruction in the Chattahoochee River in Frances Bend and sank.

=== 12 January ===
List of shipwrecks: 12 January 1902
Ship	State	Description
Rambler	United States	The passenger steamer was destroyed by fire at dock at Fall River, Massachusetts.
Valley Scout	United States	The pleasure steamer was crushed by ice and sank at Allegheny, Pennsylvania in the Allegheny River, a total loss.

=== 13 January ===
List of shipwrecks: 13 January 1902
Ship	State	Description
Glenbervie	United Kingdom	The barque was wrecked at Lowland Point near Coverack, Cornwall, laden with 600 barrels of whisky, 400 barrels of brandy and barrels of rum. The Coverack lifeboat Constance Melanie saved her 16 crewmen.

=== 14 January ===
List of shipwrecks: 14 January 1902
Ship	State	Description
Anlaby	United Kingdom	The trawler was sunk in a storm in Grindavik Bay, Iceland. Eight crewmen were killed.

=== 17 January ===
List of shipwrecks: 17 January 1902
Ship	State	Description
Pere Marquette No. 3	United States	The steamer went ashore 150 feet (46 m) north of the North Pier, Ludington, Michigan due to a rudder problem. Passengers and crew rescued by the United States Life Saving Service. Refloated, repaired and returned to service.

=== 18 January ===
List of shipwrecks: 18 January 1902
Ship	State	Description
Frank S. Stone	United States	The steamer struck a deadhead and sank in the Mobile River in 20 feet (6.1 m) of water. Later raised and repaired.

=== 20 January ===
List of shipwrecks: 20 January 1902
Ship	State	Description
C. Emlin	United States	The steamer was destroyed by fire at dock at Kimball's Mill, Apalachicola, Florida.
Eli Shriver Jr.	United States	The tow steamer heeled over due to strong tide and before she recovered she was swamped by the wake of a passing vessel and sank in 26 feet (7.9 m) of water in the East River off the foot of East Thirty-Sixth street.
Hawk	United States	The steamer struck a sunken flat and sank in the Monongahela River and was abandoned.
Lautaro	Colombian National Navy	Lautaro sinking. Thousand Days War: Operating in support of the Colombian Conservative Party, the steamer was sunk in action with the Colombian Liberal Party steamer Admiral Padilla (Colombian National Navy) in Panama Bay off Panama City, Colombia.
Nellie	United States	The steamer sank in a collision in fog in Mobile Bay with Mary Wittich (United States). Raised and repaired.

=== 21 January ===
List of shipwrecks: 21 January 1902
Ship	State	Description
Swan	United States	The anchored steamer foundered in a storm near Otter Creek, North Carolina.

=== 26 January ===
List of shipwrecks: 26 January 1902
Ship	State	Description
Cloverport	United States	The steamer ran aground in the Ohio River near Caseyville, Kentucky and afterwards was wrecked by ice, a total loss.
Oneida	United States	The steamer was sunk by ice at Creston, West Virginia on the Little Kanawha River. Raised and repaired.

=== 29 January ===
List of shipwrecks: 29 January 1902
Ship	State	Description
R. W. Burke	United States	The tow steamer struck a submerged object while tying up for the night at Dows Stores, Brooklyn, New York. She sank overnight. Later raised.

=== 31 January ===
List of shipwrecks: 31 January 1902
Ship	State	Description
Chanaral	France	The sailing ship sank 80 nautical miles (150 km; 92 mi) north west of Ushant, Belgium. 21 crew died, 1 survivor.

=== Unknown date ===
List of shipwrecks: Unknown January 1902
Ship	State	Description
Arab Steed	Norway	The barque sank in the North Sea in early January. 22 drowned.

== February ==
=== 1 February ===
List of shipwrecks: 1 February 1902
Ship	State	Description
T. K. Green	United States	The steamer struck an obstruction and sank in 11 feet (3.4 m) of water in Bayou D'Arbonne near the Lake Washington Cut-Off, Louisiana.

=== 2 February ===
List of shipwrecks: 2 February 1902
Ship	State	Description
Antelope	United States	The barge foundered off Fire Island after losing her towline to Richmond (United States) in heavy seas. Lost with all hands.
Belle of Oregon	United States	The barge foundered off Fire Island after losing her towline to Richmond (United States) in heavy seas. Lost with all hands, her captain's body washed ashore.
E. S. Atwood	United States	The steamer foundered four miles (6.4 km) off Sandy Hook, New Jersey in heavy seas in 15 fathoms (90 ft; 27 m) of water. Crew rescued by Barcelona (Germany).
Edward J. Berwind	United States	The steamer foundered two miles (3.2 km) northeast of Sandy Hook Lightship in a severe storm after her forecastle house broke away and she filled with water. Crew rescued by Barcelona (Germany).
H & A Morse	United States	The canal boat sank at dock in Brighton, New York on Staten Island possibly caused by ice. Later raised.
L. Schepp	United States	The sailing ship was driven ashore at Long Beach, New York on Long Island after losing steerage in a severe storm and hitting a submerged wreck just off shore. Later refloated.
Mystic Belle	United States	The barge washed ashore after losing her towline to Richmond (United States) in heavy seas off Fire Island.

=== 3 February ===
List of shipwrecks: 3 February 1902
Ship	State	Description
Dale	United States	The canal boat caught fire from a fire at Dock G of the Lehigh Valley Railroad and was sunk by the fire department's attempts to put out the fire. Not repaired.

=== 5 February ===
List of shipwrecks: 5 February 1902
Ship	State	Description
Ethel Quinn	United States	The coal boat sank in a collision with Spartan Prince (United States) off The Battery.
Forward	United States	The tug sank in Erie Basin, Brooklyn, New York when ice punctured her hull. Later raised.
John W. Ailes	United States	The tow steamer burned to the waterline and sank after her boiler exploded below Lock No. 2 in the Monongahela River opposite the Edgar Thomson Steel Works, Braddock, Pennsylvania. Later raised. Two or six crewmen killed.

=== 9 February ===
List of shipwrecks: 9 February 1902
Ship	State	Description
Grecian	United Kingdom	The steamer ran aground and was wrecked off Sandwich Point, Halifax, Nova Scotia.

=== 10 February ===
List of shipwrecks: 10 February 1902
Ship	State	Description
Oswego	United States	The steamer sank at Oak Point, Washington in the Columbia River.

=== 11 February ===
List of shipwrecks: 11 February 1902
Ship	State	Description
Harry P. Jones	United States	The steamer was sunk by ice at Browns Station in the Monongahela River.

=== 12 February ===
List of shipwrecks: 12 February 1902
Ship	State	Description
Princess Louise		The schooner was run down and sunk by steamer Prince Rupert (flag unknown) while anchored in the shipping channel in fog at St. John's, Newfoundland, a total loss. Later raised and beached at high tide.

=== 18 February ===
List of shipwrecks: 18 February 1902
Ship	State	Description
Mariah	United States	The schooner sank in a collision with Ocracoke (United States) near the mouth of the Neuse River.

=== 22 February ===
List of shipwrecks: 22 February 1902
Ship	State	Description
Condor	Germany	The steamer was sunk in a collision with Lacroma (Austria-Hungary) in the harbour of Catania.
Lichtenfels Brothers	United States	The barge sank in harbor at New York, New York after being stressed by weather at sea.
Mary Whitridge	United States	The barge sank 12 miles (19 km) off Asbury Park, New Jersey in a storm. Lost with all four hands.
Resolute	United States	The steamer sank at dock in North Boston. Raised and repaired.

=== 23 February ===
List of shipwrecks: 23 February 1902
Ship	State	Description
Edna	United States	The steamer sank in a hurricane off Timbalier Island, Louisiana.

=== 24 February ===
List of shipwrecks: 24 February 1902
Ship	State	Description
Condor	Royal Spanish Navy	The gunboat was sunk by a boiler explosion off Samil beach, Vigo Galicia, Spain.

=== 25 February ===
List of shipwrecks: 25 February 1902
Ship	State	Description
Liverpool	United Kingdom	The iron-hulled four-masted sailing ship was en route from Antwerp to San Francisco with general cargo when she sailed slowly onto the rocks at Hommeaux Florains, on the northeastern tip of Alderney in the Channel Islands in fog. There was no loss of life.
Lookout	United States	The steamer sank at the City Wharf at Pittsburgh, Pennsylvania in the Monongahela River. Later raised.

=== 26 February ===
List of shipwrecks: 26 February 1902
Ship	State	Description
Belle of Kaskaskia	United States	The steamer was sunk by ice three miles (4.8 km) above Chester, Illinois in the Mississippi River. Raised and repaired.
Naiad	United States	The steamer sank in the Apalachicola River at Blountstown, Florida in shallow water. Shortly thereafter the part still above water was destroyed by fire.

=== 27 February ===
List of shipwrecks: 27 February 1902
Ship	State	Description
Florence	United States	The steamer was destroyed by fire at Bordentown, New Jersey.

=== 28 February ===
List of shipwrecks: 28 February 1902
Ship	State	Description
Dauntless	United States	The passenger steamer was sunk by ice at the Duquesne Docks at Pittsburgh, Pennsylvania in the Monongahela River. Later raised.
Honey Brook	United States	The steamer was wrecked near Bakers Island in fog.
Juliet	United States	The ferry was carried away by flooding and ice in the Allegheny River at Verona, Pennsylvania and wrecked downstream and abandoned.

=== Unknown date ===
List of shipwrecks: unknown February 1902
Ship	State	Description
Huronian	United Kingdom	The passenger liner left the River Clyde for St. John's, Newfoundland on 11 February and was never seen again. A message found in a bottle on the coast of Londonderry, Northern Ireland stated the ship sank in a gale, message was authenticated. Probably sank on 12 or 13 January with all hands.
Jules Jean Baptiste	France	The sailing ship was lost on the French coast sometime in February. 80 killed.

== March ==
=== 1 March ===
List of shipwrecks: 1 March 1902
Ship	State	Description
Acara	United Kingdom	The 4,193-gross register ton steamer was wrecked without loss of life on the bar 1,500 to 1,800 feet (457 to 549 m) off Jones Inlet off the south coast of Long Island, New York, during a storm. Her wreck sank in 25 feet (8 m) of water.
Onward	United States	The tow steamer sank at a dock by the Market Street Bridge, Newark, New Jersey. Later raised.

=== 5 March ===
List of shipwrecks: 5 March 1902
Ship	State	Description
Unknown barges	United States	The barges drifted ashore and sank after losing their towline to Richmond (United States) in the Swash Channel off Romer Shoal in a snowstorm. Crews left in dories and were picked up by Richmond.
Waesland	United States	The steamer collided with the steamer Harmonides (United Kingdom) off Anglesey, United Kingdom and sank with the loss of two passengers.

=== 7 March ===
List of shipwrecks: 7 March 1902
Ship	State	Description
Welcome	United States	The sternwheel passenger paddle steamer ran aground on the north flats of the Coquille River in Oregon during a squall. She was refloated undamaged that night and returned to service.

=== 10 March ===
List of shipwrecks: 10 March 1902
Ship	State	Description
Alexandre III	France	The cargo steamer was run into and sunk by steamer Ahmadi (United Kingdom) while anchored at Jeddah, Ottoman Empire. All crew were rescued.
Iriquois	United States	The bark struck an uncharted rock off Gili Banto Island in the Straits of Sapeh, between the Indian Ocean and the Flores Sea, was a total loss.
Milton D. Ward	United States	The steamer burned while being used as a hospital during a smallpox and cholera epidemic in Detroit. She was abandoned in the "Boneyard".

=== 12 March ===
List of shipwrecks: 12 March 1902
Ship	State	Description
Providence	United States	The steamer capsized and sank in a severe gale off Ion Landing, Davis Bend, Louisiana. 5 passengers and 14 crewmen killed.

=== 19 March ===
List of shipwrecks: 19 March 1902
Ship	State	Description
Harry G. Day	United States	The steamer burned at Reeds Landing in the Savannah River.

=== 22 March ===
List of shipwrecks: 22 March 1902
Ship	State	Description
Major Barrett	United States	The steamer was destroyed by fire off Bodys Island, North Carolina. The crew were rescued by New Orleans (United States).

=== 24 March ===
List of shipwrecks: 24 March 1902
Ship	State	Description
Transit	United States	The tow steamer struck a rock on Randalls Island in the East River causing a list, when the tide rose she filled and sank.

=== 25 March ===
List of shipwrecks: 25 March 1902
Ship	State	Description
John Ewin	United Kingdom	The schooner got into difficulties in the Teifi Estuary. Her crew were taken off by Lizzie & Charles Leigh Clare ( Royal National Lifeboat Institution). She was subsequently wrecked.

=== 28 March ===
List of shipwrecks: 28 March 1902
Ship	State	Description
Holyrood	United Kingdom	The steamer was sunk in a collision with Bernard Hall (United Kingdom) 175 miles (282 km) west of Fastnet Rock in/near dense fog.

=== 29 March ===
List of shipwrecks: 29 March 1902
Ship	State	Description
Indian	United States	The 227-foot (69 m), 1,133-net ton screw steamer ran aground in fog without loss of life off the coast of Massachusetts on Sow and Pigs Reef off Cuttyhunk Island. She later was refloated, repaired, and returned to service.

=== 30 March ===
List of shipwrecks: 30 March 1902
Ship	State	Description
Belle McGowan	United States	The steamer was caught by wind and current in the Ohio River at Advance Coal Landing was capsized and sunk/wrecked and abandoned.

=== 31 March ===
List of shipwrecks: 31 March 1902
Ship	State	Description
William M. Dove	United States	The steamer sank in Boston harbor after grounding on the edge of a channel and then sliding down the slope. Later raised.

== April ==
=== 1 April ===
List of shipwrecks: 1 April 1902
Ship	State	Description
Cambrian Prince	United Kingdom	The steamer was sunk in a collision with Alma (United Kingdom) near the Nab Lightship.
George W. Wand	United States	The schooner barge was sunk in a collision with Lagonda (flag unknown). Wreck dispersed with explosives I June.

=== 3 April ===
List of shipwrecks: 3 April 1902
Ship	State	Description
Maid of Perth	United States	The ferry sank in a collision with the tug Chas. J. Reno (United States), probably in the vicinity of Albany, New York.
Superior	United States	The steamer sank at dock in Duluth, Minnesota due to an open seacock. Raised and repaired.

=== 9 April ===
List of shipwrecks: 9 April 1902
Ship	State	Description
Acorn	United States	The wrecking steamer was caught by wind and current in the Ohio River at Advance Coal Landing and was capsized and sunk. Her captain and one crewman were killed.
Harry Reid	United States	The steamer was sunk when a loaded car (RR?) ran off the end of a barge and crashed through the deck submerging the forecastle, Probably in area of St. Louis, Missouri. Scheduled to be raised later.

=== 11 April ===
List of shipwrecks: 11 April 1902
Ship	State	Description
Cheribon	Chile	The passenger steamer was wrecked at Remedios Point, Colombia.
Williamsport	United States	The steamer sank in a collision with a barge near Pollock Rip Shoals.

=== 13 April ===
List of shipwrecks: 13 April 1902
Ship	State	Description
Canadian	United Kingdom	The 96.5-foot (29.4 m), 134-ton steam trawler was sunk in a collision with another steam trawler, Game Cock (United Kingdom), in the North Sea 80 miles (130 km) off Spurn Point. Her crew were rescued by Game Cock, though three crew of that ship died.
Legia	Belgium	The steamer collided with the steamer Julia (flag unknown) off the Newarp Lightvessel (United Kingdom) and sank.

=== 15 April ===
List of shipwrecks: 15 April 1902
Ship	State	Description
Acme	United States	The 58-gross register ton steam screw tug was towing the steamer Wilkesbarre (United States) on Lake Erie when she struck a large piece of ice which stopped her forward progress. Wilkesbarre then collided with Acme, causing Acme to capsize and sink, a total loss. All four people aboard Acme survived.
P. Sanford Ross Dredge No. 7	United States	The dredge was sunk in a collision with City of Birmingham (United States) in the Savannah River.

=== 20 April ===
List of shipwrecks: 20 April 1902
Ship	State	Description
City of Pittsburgh	United States	The steamer burned in the Ohio River near Ogden's Landing, Kentucky, a total loss. 43 passengers and 21 crew were killed.
Viking	United States	Carrying a 220-ton cargo of salt, lumber, and provisions from San Francisco, California, to Unga, District of Alaska, the 146-ton, 108-foot (33 m) schooner dragged her anchors in a gale and was wrecked at Popoff Island Point off Unga. Her crew of seven survived. She later was raised, repaired, and returned to service.

=== 21 April ===
List of shipwrecks: 21 April 1902
Ship	State	Description
Lettie	United States	The schooner was lost at Port Moller (55°59′30″N 160°34′30″W), District of Alaska.

=== 22 April ===
List of shipwrecks: 22 April 1902
Ship	State	Description
Jessie	United States	The laid up steamer burned to the waterline and sank at Oak Forest, West Virginia on the Great Kanawha River, a total loss.
Lady Jane	United States	The steamer struck an obstruction and sank in the Mobile River off Mobile, Alabama in eight feet (2.4 m) of water. Raised and repaired.

=== 23 April ===
List of shipwrecks: 23 April 1902
Ship	State	Description
Hekla	Norway	The steamer was sunk in a collision with Dilkera (Australia) two miles (3.2 km) south of the Tyne River. Seven crewmen were killed. Survivors climbed aboard Dilkera as Hekla sank.
Unknown barge	United States	The barge, under tow of Plymouth (United States), was damaged in a collision with Spartan (flag unknown) in fog in Massachusetts Bay, sinking three hours later.

=== 24 April ===
List of shipwrecks: 24 April 1902
Ship	State	Description
John Anson	United States	The tow steamer was destroyed when her boiler exploded at Newtown Creek. One crewman killed, two men injured.

=== 25 April ===
List of shipwrecks: 25 April 1902
Ship	State	Description
Sunrise	United States	The steamer was destroyed by fire at New Orleans, Louisiana.

=== 26 April ===
List of shipwrecks: 26 April 1902
Ship	State	Description
Cornelia Soule	United States	During a voyage from Maine to Philadelphia, Pennsylvania, with a cargo of cut granite jetty stones, the 306-gross register ton three-masted schooner ran aground during a gale on the Rockaway Shoals south of Long Island, New York. Her six-man crew was rescued on 27 April, but she broke up and sank in 25 feet (8 m) of water at 40°25.992′N 073°10.620′W. Her wreck is known as the "Granite Wreck".
Grace E. Gribble	United States	The schooner foundered in a gale off Point Pelee. Three lost.
Mayflower	United States	The scow foundered in a gale between Mount Clemens, Michigan and Algonac, Michigan, a total loss.
Monterey	United States	The steamer was caught by wind in the Monongahela River near Glassport, Pennsylvania, and capsized and sank. She later was raised.
M. P. Barklow	United States	The schooner sank in a gale while at anchor at South Bass Island in Lake Erie. Her captain, his wife and son, and one crewman drowned.

=== 27 April ===
List of shipwrecks: 27 April 1902
Ship	State	Description
Concordia	United States	The 110-ton schooner was wrecked 10 nautical miles (19 km; 12 mi) west of the Virgin Rocks (51°13′N 128°14′W) on the coast of British Columbia, Canada.
Wonder	United States	The laid up towboat was destroyed by fire at Stapleton, New York on Staten Island.

=== 28 April ===
List of shipwrecks: 28 April 1902
Ship	State	Description
King	United States	The steamer sprung a leak in Boston lower harbor and was beached. She then caught fire and became a total loss.

=== 30 April ===
List of shipwrecks: 30 April 1902
Ship	State	Description
Henry Hughes	United States	The barge, under tow of Volunteer (United States), swamped and sank in rough seas 1/4 mile (0.40 km) south west of Bridgeport, Connecticut. One crewman killed.
Wm. E. Baxter	United States	The barge, under tow of Volunteer (United States), swamped and sank in rough seas 1/4 mile (0.40 km) south west of Bridgeport, Connecticut. Her captain and a stewardess were killed.

=== Unknown date ===
List of shipwrecks: Unknown date April 1902
Ship	State	Description
Maggie Elizabeth	United States	The 11-gross register ton schooner was stranded in the Chesapeake Bay at Cedar Point on the coast of Maryland at the mouth of the Patuxent River. Both people on board survived.

== May ==
=== 2 May ===
List of shipwrecks: 2 May 1902
Ship	State	Description
Jennie George	United States	The steamer struck rocks and sank at Catlettsburg, Kentucky on the Big Sandy River. Her machinery was salvaged.
Vesta	United States	The steamer capsized and sank in the Monongahela River near Glenwood, Pennsylvania, during a storm. She later was raised.

=== 5 May ===
List of shipwrecks: 5 May 1902
Ship	State	Description
Kanawha	United States	The steamer smashed her bow on the lock wall at the Davis Island Dam on the Ohio River and sank. Later raised.

=== 6 May ===
List of shipwrecks: 6 May 1902
Ship	State	Description
Camorta	United Kingdom	The passenger ship sank in the Irrawaddy Delta in a cyclone with the loss of all 737 passengers and crew.
Ceres	United States	The towboat was sunk in a collision with Albert H. Ellis (United States) in the East River.

=== 7 May ===
List of shipwrecks: 7 May 1902
Ship	State	Description
Frolic	United States	The naptha launch sank in a collision with the steamer Arthur Woods (United States) on the Maumee River near Toledo, Ohio. Seven killed.

=== 9 May ===
List of shipwrecks: 9 May 1902
Ship	State	Description
Gov. Norton	United States	The Buffalo Police Department steamer struck a submerged object in the harbor at Buffalo, New York and sank.

=== 10 May ===
List of shipwrecks: 10 May 1902
Ship	State	Description
South Dakota	United States	The steamer burned in the Missouri River between Running Water, South Dakota and Yankton, South Dakota.

=== 13 May ===
List of shipwrecks: 13 May 1902
Ship	State	Description
I. C. Woodard	United States	The steamer smashed her bow in a collision with Twilight (United States) on the Monongahela River and sank.

=== 14 May ===
List of shipwrecks: 14 May 1902
Ship	State	Description
S. H. Lathrop	United States	The wooden schooner was scuttled in 3 feet (0.9 m) of water in Lake Huron near Alpena, Michigan, at 45.073684°N 83.373175°W and abandoned.

=== 21 May ===
List of shipwrecks: 21 May 1902
Ship	State	Description
Kittie M. Forbes	United States	The steamer caught fire in the St. Clair River or Lake St. Clair off Star Island and was beached on the Canadian side and burned to the waterline. Raised on 10 July and towed to Algonac, Michigan where her machinery was removed. In May 1905 she was towed to Fort William, Ontario where she was converted into a lighter.

=== 22 May ===
List of shipwrecks: 22 May 1902
Ship	State	Description
John K. Speed	United States	The steamer burned at New Orleans, Louisiana, a total loss.

=== 24 May ===
List of shipwrecks: 24 May 1902
Ship	State	Description
Edith	United States	The steamer sank at dock at Fulton, Florida. Promptly raised.
Stanleyville	Belgium	The steamer was wrecked off Takoradi, Gold Coast.

=== 27 May ===
List of shipwrecks: 27 May 1902
Ship	State	Description
Camano	United States	The steamer capsized and sank near Entiat, Washington, in the Columbia River, a total loss. One crewman killed.
HMS Recruit	Royal Navy	The Brazen-class destroyer struck rocks one-half mile (0.80 km) north of Cape Cornwall. Refloated and towed to Penzance by tugs.

=== 28 May ===
List of shipwrecks: 28 May 1902
Ship	State	Description
Zalus Davis	United States	The steamer sank in 25 feet (7.6 m) of water after a plank got knocked out of place. Raised and repaired.

=== Unknown date ===
List of shipwrecks: Unknown date in May 1902
Ship	State	Description
Ryvingen	Norway	The full-rigged ship was driven ashore and wrecked in Table Bay. Her crew were rescued by lifeboat. She was on a voyage from Ardrossan, Ayrshire, United Kingdom to Cape Town.

== June ==
=== 2 June ===
List of shipwrecks: 2 June 1902
Ship	State	Description
Mataafa	United States	The bulk carrier was stranded in fog on Knife Island in Lake Superior. She later was refloated, repaired, and returned to service.

=== 5 June ===
List of shipwrecks: 5 June 1902
Ship	State	Description
Pensaukee	United States	The tow steamer was sunk at dock when struck by the barge Aurora at Cleveland, Ohio.

=== 6 June ===
List of shipwrecks: 6 June 1902
Ship	State	Description
Talbot	United States	The steamer sprung a leak and was beached on Sharps Island, Maryland. Later pumped out and refloated.

=== 7 June ===
List of shipwrecks: 7 June 1902
Ship	State	Description
George G. Hadley	United States	The steamer was damaged in a collision with the steamer Thomas Wilson (United States) and beached. Later refloated, taken to West Superior, Wisconsin for temporary repairs and then to Milwaukee for permanent repairs.
Shinonome	Imperial Japanese Navy	The destroyer ran aground on the coral reef Yaebishi in the Miyako Islands north of Ikema Island. She eventually was refloated and reached port.
Thomas Wilson	United States	Three capstans at the stern of the wreck of Thomas Wilson on 15 August 2007 The whaleback cargo ship sank off the harbor at Duluth, Minnesota, in 70 feet (21 m) of water after a collision with the steamer George G. Hadley (United States). Nine crew were killed.

=== 10 June ===
List of shipwrecks: 10 June 1902
Ship	State	Description
Comet	United States	The steamer foundered at dock in Burlington, Iowa in a severe storm.
Riddha	Germany	The cargo vessel stranded at Tiree, Scotland and was lost.

=== 11 June ===
List of shipwrecks: 11 June 1902
Ship	State	Description
Pioneer		The 90-foot (27 m) sailing cargo vessel (formerly a tug) was washed out of the river at Port St Johns, Cape Colony; no trace was found.
Richard Roach or Bernard Roach	United States	The canal boat was sunk in a collision with Genesee (United States) off Pier 6 in the East River. A child was killed.

=== 12 June ===
List of shipwrecks: 12 June 1902
Ship	State	Description
Advance	Australia	Advance The schooner was wrecked at Henry's Point, Botany Bay, New South Wales, Australia.
Ravenna	United States	The steamer capsized in a sudden severe windstorm in the Maquoketa Chute eight miles (13 km) above Dubuque, Iowa. Raised, taken to Stillwater, Minnesota and repaired. Her master and three crewmen killed.
Relief	United States	The steamer struck a sunken barge loaded with steel rails causing her to capsize and sink in the Ohio River at Rising Sun, Indiana. Raised and repaired.
Unknown sailboat	United States	The small sailboat capsized when it changed course turning under the bow of Hockomock (United States) at Bath, Maine. A number of people drowned, including three women, the wife and daughter of the man operating the boat included.

=== 22 June ===
List of shipwrecks: 22 June 1902
Ship	State	Description
Kai Che	Imperial Chinese Navy	The Kai Che-class unprotected cruiser was sunk by an accidental internal explosion at Nanking, China, and became a total loss. 148 killed.

=== 24 June ===
List of shipwrecks: 24 June 1902
Ship	State	Description
John A. Griswald	United States	The tow steamer was sunk off Communipaw, New Jersey when Sandy Hook (United States) passed so close to the scow she had lashed alongside, that the scow rolled severely, dumping her load of sand. When the scow righted she came down with such force on John A. Griswald that the tow steamer sank.

=== 27 June ===
List of shipwrecks: 27 June 1902
Ship	State	Description
J. D. Patterson	United States	The steamer was lost with all hands, probably in the Virginia area.

=== 28 June ===
List of shipwrecks: 28 June 1902
Ship	State	Description
Gustav Adolph	Norway	The barque ran onto rocks near Port Elizabeth, South Africa, just west of the Palmiet River and was wrecked.

=== 29 June ===
List of shipwrecks: 29 June 1902
Ship	State	Description
George Dunbar	United States	The steamer sank in a gale on Lake Erie near Kellys Island. Seven crewmen killed, only the captain and his wife and daughter survived. The wreck was dispersed with dynamite in October.

=== Unknown date ===
List of shipwrecks: Unknown date June 1902
Ship	State	Description
Seaside	United States	The 31-gross register ton screw steamer was stranded in Hammerly Inlet on the coast of Washington. All three people on board survived.

== July ==
=== 1 July ===
List of shipwrecks: 1 July 1902
Ship	State	Description
Playmate	United States	The yacht burned to the waterline at Linden Avenue, Jersey City, New Jersey.

=== 2 July ===
List of shipwrecks: 2 July 1902
Ship	State	Description
New Haven	United States	The freighter sprung a leak and sank in the Little Wabash River at Decker's Landing. Raised and repaired.
Una	United States	The steamer sank at dock in Beaumont, Texas after being damaged earlier in a collision while underway with Lawrence (United States) in the Neches River 3 1/2 miles (5.6 km) below the town.

=== 3 July ===
List of shipwrecks: 3 July 1902
Ship	State	Description
O. Willis No. 2	United States	The laid up steamer broke loose from her dock during a sudden rise in the Allegheny River at Kittanning, Pennsylvania and was swept downstream and was wrecked and abandoned.
Sultana	Australia	The cutter sank in Spencer Gulf.

=== 6 July ===
List of shipwrecks: 6 July 1902
Ship	State	Description
Willie	United States	The tug was destroyed by fire at dock over night at New Baltimore, New York.

=== 7 July ===
List of shipwrecks: 7 July 1902
Ship	State	Description
Cumberland	United States	The steamer was damaged in a collision in dense fog in Boston Harbor with Admiral Farragut (United States) and beached to prevent sinking.

=== 8 July ===
List of shipwrecks: 8 July 1902
Ship	State	Description
J. N. Coombs	United States	The 17-gross register ton schooner sank at Big Pass, Florida. All three people on board survived.

=== 10 July ===
List of shipwrecks: 10 July 1902
Ship	State	Description
Bessie Clary	United States	The steamer struck a rock and sank in the Flint River, a total loss.

=== 15 July ===
List of shipwrecks: 15 July 1902
Ship	State	Description
Isley	United Kingdom	The paddle wheel passenger/cargo ferry was wrecked on Sheep Island off Port Ellen, Scotland.

=== 20 July ===
List of shipwrecks: 20 July 1902
Ship	State	Description
Fleetwing	United States	After her gasoline engine broke down, the 14-gross register ton, 36.8-foot (11.2 m) motor vessel was driven ashore and wrecked at the mouth of the Snake River at Nome, District of Alaska. She filled with water and was abandoned.
James Herron	United States	The steamer was destroyed by fire at dock at Bordentown, New Jersey.

=== 24 July ===
List of shipwrecks: 24 July 1902
Ship	State	Description
Charlie Higbee	United States	The steamer burned, a total loss, probably at New Orleans, Louisiana.
Harry Higbee	United States	The steamer burned, a total loss, when Charlie Higbee, tied up alongside, burned, probably at New Orleans, Louisiana.
Henry J. Johnson	United States	The steamer was sunk in a collision with Fred Pabst (United States) ten miles (16 km) below Poes Reef, off Spectacle Reef and the Ninemile Point Light in Lake Huron.

=== 25 July ===
List of shipwrecks: 25 July 1902
Ship	State	Description
Robert Taylor	United States	The steamer struck rocks in the Ohio River at Osborne, Pennsylvania and sank.

=== 28 July ===
List of shipwrecks: 28 July 1902
Ship	State	Description
Glide	United States	The steamer caught fire off Mulkilteo and was beached for a total loss.
Mary Blue	United States	The steamer was destroyed by fire at Punta Gorda, Florida.

=== Unknown date ===
List of shipwrecks: unknown July 1902
Ship	State	Description
Primus	Sweden	The passenger steamer sank in the Elbe River. 112 killed.

== August ==
=== 3 August ===
List of shipwrecks: 3 August 1902
Ship	State	Description
Ed. S. Dilly	United States	The steamer was destroyed by a boiler explosion at Favre Port, Mississippi.
John Torrent	United States	The steamer sank at her dock in the Chicago River.

=== 4 August ===
List of shipwrecks: 4 August 1902
Ship	State	Description
Wordsworth	Belgium	The ship was wrecked off Assu Torre, Bahia, Brazil.

=== 5 August ===
List of shipwrecks: 5 August 1902
Ship	State	Description
City of Venice	United States	The steamer was sunk in a collision with Seguin (Canada) on Lake Erie off Rondeau, Ontario. Three crewmen killed.

=== 6 August ===
List of shipwrecks: 6 August 1902
Ship	State	Description
Eocene	United States	The steamer was destroyed by fire at the J. M. Guffey Wharf, Port Arthur, Texas.
Sonoma	United States	The steamer sank over night at Wood Island, California. Later pumped out.

=== 7 August ===
List of shipwrecks: 7 August 1902
Ship	State	Description
New Brunswick	United States	The passenger steamer caught fire in the Raritan River and was beached and burned to the waterline.

=== 10 August ===
List of shipwrecks: 10 August 1902
Ship	State	Description
Northern Belle	United States	The steamer dropped onto a snag when the river level dropped puncturing the hull and causing her to sink in the Menoskong River. Her machinery was salvaged.

=== 13 August ===
List of shipwrecks: 13 August 1902
Ship	State	Description
Billy	United States	The 16-ton scow dragged her anchor three nautical miles (5.6 km; 3.5 mi) north of Point Alava (55°11′30″N 131°11′00″W) at the southern tip of Revillagigedo Island in the Alexander Archipelago in Southeast Alaska during a storm and was washed onto rocks, where she became a total loss.
Jacob Kuper	United States	The tow steamer was sunk when her boiler exploded off Tompkinsville, New York, Staten Island. Three of her crew and one crewman of the barge she was pulling were killed.
Star	United States	The tow steamer caught fire at Port Chester Creek and was beached. She burned to the waterline.

=== 20 August ===
List of shipwrecks: 20 August 1902
Ship	State	Description
Daisy	Brazil	The steamer ran aground and was wrecked Pregnacas, Brazil.
Will H. Isom	United States	The 983-gross register ton, 183.8-foot (56.0 m) sternwheel paddle steamer and two barges she was towing were forced ashore and wrecked at Point Romanof, District of Alaska. Will H. Isom's hulk was refloated and moved to St. Michael, Alaska, where it rotted away on the beach.

=== 22 August ===
List of shipwrecks: 22 August 1902
Ship	State	Description
M. C. Moseley	United States	The schooner was sunk in a collision with James S. Whitney (United States) in dense fog in Long Island Sound east of Watch Hill Light. Crew rescued by James S. Whitney.

=== 24 August ===
List of shipwrecks: 24 August 1902
Ship	State	Description
Gov. Allen	United States	The steamer struck a rock in the Merrimack River above Lowell, Massachusetts and sank.
Laurida	United States	The tug burned in drydock at Athens, New York, a total loss.

=== 25 August ===
List of shipwrecks: 25 August 1902
Ship	State	Description
John C. Fisher	United States	The steamer filled with water in the Monongahela River at Braddock, Pennsylvania and sank. Raised and repaired.
V. L. Watson	United States	The steamer struck a stump in Bayou Des Allemands, Louisiana three miles (4.8 km) above Des Allemands, Louisiana sinking in shallow water from the stern to the front of the boiler. Raised on 6 September.

=== 31 August ===
List of shipwrecks: 31 August 1902
Ship	State	Description
Annie S.	United States	The yacht sank a half hour after striking a submerged wreck along the coast of Maine. Her crew reached Libby Island, Maine in boats.

== September ==
=== 1 September ===
List of shipwrecks: 1 September 1902
Ship	State	Description
Agostino Rombo	Italy	The Great Gale of 1902: The barque was wrecked in the gale on North End Beach, Algoa Bay, South Africa. Her captain and six crew died.
Arnold	Germany	The Great Gale of 1902: The barque was wrecked in the gale on North End Beach, Algoa Bay, South Africa.
Cavaliere Michele Russo	Italy	The Great Gale of 1902: The ship broke in two and sank in the gale off North End Beach, Algoa Bay, South Africa. 17 crew died.
Clara	United Kingdom	The Great Gale of 1902: The tug was wrecked in the gale on North End Beach, Algoa Bay, South Africa.
Constant	Norway	The Great Gale of 1902: The barque was wrecked in the gale on North End Beach, Algoa Bay, South Africa. Her captain and six crew died.
Content	Norway or Sweden	The Great Gale of 1902: The barque was wrecked in the gale on North End Beach, Algoa Bay, South Africa.
Coriolanus	Germany	The Great Gale of 1902: The barque was wrecked in the gale on North End Beach, Algoa Bay, South Africa. Refloated in 1903, repaired and returned to service.
Countess of Carnarvon	United Kingdom	The Great Gale of 1902: The tug was wrecked in the gale on North End Beach, Algoa Bay, South Africa.
Emmanuel	Germany	The Great Gale of 1902: The barque was wrecked in the gale on North End Beach, Algoa Bay, South Africa.
Gabrielle	United Kingdom	The Great Gale of 1902: The schooner was wrecked in the gale on North End Beach, Algoa Bay, South Africa.
Hans Wagner	Germany	The Great Gale of 1902: The barque was wrecked in the gale on North End Beach, Algoa Bay, South Africa. Refloated in 1903, repaired and returned to service.
Hermanos	Norway	The Great Gale of 1902: The barque was wrecked in the gale on North End Beach, Algoa Bay, South Africa. Two crew died.
Inchcape Rock	United Kingdom	The Great Gale of 1902: The sailing ship sank in the gale off North End Beach, Algoa Bay, South Africa.
Iris	Norway	The Great Gale of 1902: The sailing ship was wrecked in the gale on North End Beach, Algoa Bay, South Africa.
Kimara		The Great Gale of 1902: The vessel was wrecked in the gale on North End Beach, Algoa Bay, South Africa.
Limari	Sweden	The Great Gale of 1902: The barque was wrecked in the gale on North End Beach, Algoa Bay, South Africa. Eight crew killed.
M. D. Carrington	United States	The steamer capsized and sank in the harbor of Duluth, Minnesota-West Superior, Wisconsin. Her engineer was killed.
Nautilus	Germany	The Great Gale of 1902: The barque was wrecked in the gale on North End Beach, Algoa Bay, South Africa. Her captain and 11 crew killed.
Oakworth	United Kingdom	The Great Gale of 1902: The sailing vessel was wrecked in the gale on North End Beach, Algoa Bay, South Africa.
Sayre	United Kingdom	The Great Gale of 1902: The barque was wrecked in the gale on North End Beach, Algoa Bay, South Africa.
Scotia	United Kingdom	The Great Gale of 1902: The cargo ship was wrecked in the gale on North End Beach, Algoa Bay, South Africa.
Scotia	United Kingdom	The Great Gale of 1902: The steam lighter was wrecked in the gale on North End Beach, Algoa Bay, South Africa.
Thekla	Germany	The Great Gale of 1902: The schooner was wrecked in the gale on North End Beach, Algoa Bay, South Africa.
Waimea	Norway	The Great Gale of 1902: The barque was wrecked in the gale on North End Beach, Algoa Bay, South Africa breaking in two. Her captain and seven crew died.

=== 3 September ===
List of shipwrecks: 3 September 1902
Ship	State	Description
Sylvester	United States	The yacht was wrecked near Sturgeon Bay, Michigan.

=== 4 September ===
List of shipwrecks: 4 September 1902
Ship	State	Description
I. M. Weston	United States	The steamer was destroyed by fire while lying in the Chicago Drainage Canal.

=== 6 September ===
List of shipwrecks: 6 September 1902
Ship	State	Description
Crête-à-Pierrot	(Haiti) Haitian Navy	Crête-à-Pierrot The gunboat was scuttled by the deliberate detonation of her aft magazine at Gonaïves, Haiti, to prevent her capture by the gunboat SMS Panther (Imperial German Navy). All five crew remaining on board at the time of the explosion were killed, along with an admiral and a surgeon. Panther then fired 30 shots into her wreck to complete her destruction. $50,000 in gold was looted from the wreck before 1907, her guns salvaged in 1907. The wreck was scheduled to be destroyed in 1907.
J. B. Ward	United States	Carrying two passengers, three crewmen and a cargo of 15 tons of general merchandise, the 28-gross register ton, 48.2-foot (14.7 m) schooner was wrecked without loss of life in Inunudah Bay (56°39′N 157°27′W) on the coast of Umnak Island in the Aleutian Islands after her anchor chains parted during a gale. The revenue cutter USRC Manning ( United States Revenue Cutter Service) rescued all on board.

=== 7 September ===
List of shipwrecks: 7 September 1902
Ship	State	Description
Courtney Ford	United States	During a voyage from St. Michael, District of Alaska, to Port Townsend, Washington, and San Francisco, California, the 401.11-gross register ton, 146.3-foot (44.6 m) three-masted schooner – a converted brigantine – was wrecked on Glen Island (55°18′N 162°55′W) off the Bering Sea coast of the Alaska Peninsula. There were six survivors.
Unknown scow	United States	The scow, under tow of Bee (United States), was sunk in a collision with a scow under tow of Alfred W. Booth (United States) in the harbor of New York City.

=== 8 September ===
List of shipwrecks: 8 September 1902
Ship	State	Description
C. W. Crossman	United States	The steamer was destroyed by fire at dock in Alexandria Bay.
Steven C. Hall	United States	The steamer struck a dock and sank at Sandusky, Ohio.
William H. Stevens	United States	The steamer was destroyed by fire that started in the Engine Room 25 miles (40 km) from Clear Creek on Lake Erie.

=== 9 September ===
List of shipwrecks: 9 September 1902
Ship	State	Description
Eddystone	United States	The steamer sank at dock at the Arch Street wharf in Philadelphia, Pennsylvania due to a leak in the stern bearings.
H. Houghten	United States	The steamer sank at her dock in Detroit. Two crewmen killed.

=== 10 September ===
List of shipwrecks: 10 September 1902
Ship	State	Description
Unknown scow	United States	The scow, under tow of Navigator (United States), foundered in a storm off the Fire Island Lighthouse.

=== 11 September ===
List of shipwrecks: 11 September 1902
Ship	State	Description
City of Rome	United States	The steamer sprung a leak in a heavy gale 15 miles (24 km) north of the Lake Superior Ship Canal. She was beached in Bete Grise Bay on Point Isabel. Later refloated and towed to Cleveland, Ohio for repairs.
Good Hope	United States	The 12-ton, 34-foot (10.4 m) or 39.9-foot (12.2 m) schooner slipped her anchor and was driven ashore and wrecked with the loss of both people on board 2 nautical miles (3.7 km; 2.3 mi) west of Lanes Derrick in the roadstead at Nome, District of Alaska.
W. H. Moore	United States	The fishing steamer sprung a leak on Lake Erie and was beached and abandoned near Ashtabula, Ohio.

=== 15 September ===
List of shipwrecks: 15 September 1902
Ship	State	Description
Eunice Cobb	United States	The steamer burned to the waterline at Cramer Hill, New Jersey.

=== 17 September ===
List of shipwrecks: 17 September 1902
Ship	State	Description
Cottage City	United States	The 1,885-gross register ton, 293-foot (89.3 m) steamer was stranded without loss of life on a shelf of rock off Island Point (56°06′N 132°21′W) on Etolin Island in the Alexander Archipelago in Southeast Alaska, losing her stem, forefoot, and 40 feet (12.2 m) of her keel. Several hours later, the steamer Spokane (United States) took off her 150 passengers, and lighters removed her cargo. She was refloated three weeks after the wreck and proceeded to Seattle, Washington, under her own steam.

=== 20 September ===
List of shipwrecks: 20 September 1902
Ship	State	Description
Lurline	United States	The steamer struck rocks in the Columbia River 1,000 feet (300 m) above Waterford, Washington, in heavy fog and was beached.

=== 22 September ===
List of shipwrecks: 22 September 1902
Ship	State	Description
Venus	United Kingdom	The "Dandy" was sunk in a collision with trawler "Doris" (United Kingdom) near the Bull Lightship in the River Humber.

=== 27 September ===
List of shipwrecks: 27 September 1902
Ship	State	Description
F & F	United States	The steamer sank at dock in Wilmington, North Carolina.

=== Unknown date ===
List of shipwrecks: Unknown date September 1902
Ship	State	Description
Stroller	United States	The 11-gross register ton motor yacht burned at Harpswell, Maine. All three people on board survived.

== October ==
=== 3 October ===
List of shipwrecks: 3 October 1902
Ship	State	Description
General Siglin	United States	During a voyage from Nome, District of Alaska, to Puget Sound, Washington, with a scheduled stop at Dutch Harbor on Amaknak Island in the Aleutian Islands, the 81-ton, 80-foot (24.4 m) two-masted schooner was last seen off Unimak Island outside the entrance to False Pass. She never arrived at Dutch Harbor. Her entire crew of eight perished.

=== 6 October ===
List of shipwrecks: 6 October 1902
Ship	State	Description
Little Belle	United States	The steamer sank in a collision with a barge at Marchants Landing, Florida on the Apalachicola River.
Otelia Pedersen	United States	The schooner was disabled in a gale on 25 September. She was abandoned by her crew on 6 October and were rescued by USS Princeton (United States Navy). The derelict and drifting vessel was wrecked later that day on rocks on Botel Tobago Island off Formosa.

=== 7 October ===
List of shipwrecks: 7 October 1902
Ship	State	Description
Ann Marie	United States	The schooner was wrecked in a storm at Kincardine, Ontario. Her captain, two crewmen, the female cook, and one in the rescue party were killed.

=== 9 October ===
List of shipwrecks: 9 October 1902
Ship	State	Description
Apache	United States	The steamer was damaged in a collision with Iroquois (United States) in the harbor at Charleston, South Carolina. She was then grounded in 20 feet (6.1 m) of water until emergency repairs could be made.
Clan McDonald	United States	The steamer caught fire off Chuckanut, Washington and was beached for a total loss.
Columbia	United States	The steamer struck a rock in Indian Rapids, Oregon in the Columbia River and sank.

=== 10 October ===
List of shipwrecks: 10 October 1902
Ship	State	Description
A. A. Bellinger	United States	The steamer struck a reef in the Emerald Channel near the entrance to the Niagara River on Lake Erie and sank.
Garden City	United States	The steam barge was destroyed by fire in the Saginaw River.
Yoshina Maru	Japan	The steamer caught fire in the Van Diemen Strait and was abandoned. She then drifted ashore at Kagoshima, Japan.

=== 11 October ===
List of shipwrecks: 11 October 1902
Ship	State	Description
Lewis	United States	The steamer was destroyed by fire at McKenzies Landing, Florida on the Manatee River.
No Wonder	United States	The steamer struck a snag or submerged piling at the mouth of the Cowlitz River and sank.
Speranza	United States	The yacht burned and sank in the Raritan River.
Vaynol	United Kingdom	The 233-ton coaster was sunk in a collision with trawler "Lucerne" (United Kingdom) off the Mull of Galloway. Crew rescued by Lucerne.

=== 13 October ===
List of shipwrecks: 13 October 1902
Ship	State	Description
Barge 129	United States	The whaleback barge sank in Lake Superior in a storm when holed by the anchor of her tow ship Mauna Loa (United States) 35 miles (56 km) off Vermilion Point in 650 feet (200 m) of water. The wreck was discovered in 2021 and identified in 2022, the last whaleback wreck to be located.
C. B. Lockwood	United States	The fishing steamer suffered a broken steam pipe on Lake Erie 13 miles (21 km) north north east of Fairport, Ohio and dropped anchor in a gale with heavy seas. Shortly after dropping anchor she sprung a leak and sank. Her crew abandoned ship in two boats. Part of her crew was rescued from one boat by a passing steamer, the other boat was found capsized the next day, ten crewmen drowned.
Champion	United States	The ferry burned to the waterline and sank at Gallipolis, Ohio overnight, a total loss.

=== 14 October ===
List of shipwrecks: 14 October 1902
Ship	State	Description
Ensign	United States	The yacht sank near the Ice Pier, Gallipolis, Ohio. Raised and repaired.

=== 15 October ===
List of shipwrecks: 15 October 1902
Ship	State	Description
Hattie B. Pereue	United States	The steamer missed the harbor at Holland, Michigan and ran ashore and was wrecked.
Richmond	United States	The steamer destroyed by fire at Texas City, Texas.

=== 16 October ===
List of shipwrecks: 16 October 1902
Ship	State	Description
Eight unknown barges	United States	The eight barges, all loaded with coal, under tow of Fred Wilson (United States), were sunk after the tow steamer Gleaner (United States) grounded on Twelve Pole Bar in the Ohio River then turned across the channel in front of Fred Wilson resulting in a collision. The barges were abandoned after some coal was recovered. They were later removed by the US Government snag boat E. A. Woodruff (United States).
Unknown barges	United States	The three barges, of 22 barges and 1 flat, all loaded with coal, under tow of Gleaner (United States), were sunk after Gleaner grounded on Twelve Pole Bar in the Ohio River then turned across the channel in front of Fred Wilson (United States) resulting in a collision. The barges were later raised and some coal recovered.
Unknown barges	United States	The two barges, both loaded with coal, under tow of Sam Brown (United States), were sunk after Sam Brown grounded on Sand Creek Bar in the Ohio River. Some coal was recovered.

=== 18 October ===
List of shipwrecks: 18 October 1902
Ship	State	Description
Chelan	United States	The steamer struck Thompsons Bar in the Columbia River causing a severe leak and was beached in eight feet (2.4 m) of water.
Unknown barge	United States	The barge, under tow of Empire (United States), was sunk in a collision with the ferry Netherlands (United States) off Pier 13 in the North River.

=== 19 October ===
List of shipwrecks: 19 October 1902
Ship	State	Description
John Miner	United States	The schooner was wrecked on Point aux Barques Reef, a total loss.
Unknown canal boat	United States	The canal boat, under tow of Media (United States), was sunk in a collision with a car float under the tow of Unity (United States) in the harbor of New York City.

=== 22 October ===
List of shipwrecks: 22 October 1902
Ship	State	Description
City of Sheffield	United States	The passenger paddle steamer was lost by burning at Grand Tower, Illinois.
Parlor City	United States	The steamer was sunk at dock at New Orleans, Louisiana when struck by Natchez (United States). Later raised and repaired.

=== 23 October ===
List of shipwrecks: 23 October 1902
Ship	State	Description
City of Denver	United States	The steamer struck a snag in the Skagit River and sank. Later raised and repaired.

=== 27 October ===
List of shipwrecks: 27 October 1902
Ship	State	Description
Ventnor	New Zealand	The steamer left Wellington for Hong Kong on 26 October 1902. At about 12:30 am the next morning it struck a reef off Cape Egmont leading to damage. The ship sank about 16 kilometres (9.9 mi) off the coast, in 147-metre-deep (482 ft) water, near Hokianga Heads on 27 October, with 13 crew killed as their lifeboat capsized.

=== 28 October ===
List of shipwrecks: 28 October 1902
Ship	State	Description
Capital City	United States	The steamer was damaged in a collision with Trader (United Kingdom) and beached.

=== 29 October ===
List of shipwrecks: 29 October 1902
Ship	State	Description
Lena Mobray	United States	The steamer burned at Stockton, Alabama and was abandoned.

=== 31 October ===
List of shipwrecks: 31 October 1902
Ship	State	Description
Charon	United States	The steamer struck a snag and sank at Grape Island, West Virginia. Immediately raised and taken to Parkersburg, West Virginia for repairs.
Enero	Spain	The steamer was sunk in a collision with St Regulus (United Kingdom) off Dungeness, England. 27 crew were killed, 3 were rescued by St Regulus.
Jersey	United States	The motor vessel struck a snag in the Sacramento River near Bowens Landing, sinking at Clarksburg, California. The wreck had not been raised as of early 1903.
Staut	Norway	The steamer ship foundered on Terschelling, the Netherlands, due to a navigation error. Much of the cargo was salvaged.

=== Unknown date ===
List of shipwrecks: Unknown date October 1902
Ship	State	Description
Louise	United States	The small schooner was wrecked on the beach at Nome, District of Alaska.

== November ==
=== 3 November ===
List of shipwrecks: 3 November 1902
Ship	State	Description
Choctaw	United States	The steamer struck an obstruction and sank 1/2 mile (0.80 km) below Greenwood, Mississippi in the Yazoo River, a total loss.

=== 4 November ===
List of shipwrecks: 4 November 1902
Ship	State	Description
Charlie Bucki	United States	The cargo schooner was sunk in a collision with Admiral Sampson (United States) in Massachusetts Bay in dense fog. Her captain and three crewmen were killed.

=== 5 November ===
List of shipwrecks: 5 November 1902
Ship	State	Description
Irene	United States	The yacht struck a jetty entering Sandusky Bay and sank.

=== 7 November ===
List of shipwrecks: 7 November 1902
Ship	State	Description
Record	United States	The tug, docked at the Minnesota Ore Docks, Superior, Wisconsin, was hit and sunk by Bransford (United States). One of her firemen was scalded in the sinking and died on 13 November.

=== 8 November ===
List of shipwrecks: 8 November 1902
Ship	State	Description
Unknown barge	United States	The barge, under tow of Abram P. Skidmore (United States), was sunk in a collision with a barge under tow of S. O. Co. No. 7 (United States) off Glasson's Point, New York in the East River.

=== 9 November ===
List of shipwrecks: 9 November 1902
Ship	State	Description
Elingamite	Australia	The passenger ship ran aground and was wrecked on West Island in the Three Kings Islands, New Zealand, in thick fog due to inaccurate maps. 28 passengers and 17 crew died out of 136 passengers and 58 crew.
Gem	United States	The fishing steamer burned to the waterline and sank in Casco Bay.

=== 10 November ===
List of shipwrecks: 10 November 1902
Ship	State	Description
Unknown barge	United States	The barge, under tow of Mattie (United States), was sunk in a collision with a barge under tow of Harlem River No. 3 (United States) in the Harlem River.

=== 13 November ===
List of shipwrecks: 13 November 1902
Ship	State	Description
Eleanor	United States	The steamer was destroyed by fire at dock in Montague, Michigan.

=== 14 November ===
List of shipwrecks: 14 November 1902
Ship	State	Description
Bob Ballard	United States	The rail ferry sank at Ashland, Kentucky when a run away rail car smashed into her forecastle. Raised and repaired.

=== 15 November ===
List of shipwrecks: 15 November 1902
Ship	State	Description
Charles Turner	United States	The steamer sank in 14 feet (4.3 m) of water at Iron City Mines Dock, Pittsburgh. Raised and repaired.
Sadie	United States	The 11-gross register ton schooner sank off Cutler, Maine. Both people on board survived.

=== 16 November ===
List of shipwrecks: 16 November 1902
Ship	State	Description
Rogue River	United States	The 80-gross register ton sternwheel paddle steamer struck a rock in the Rogue River in Oregon one-half mile (0.80 km) below the mouth of the Illinois River, destroying her rudder. The helpless vessel drifted three miles (4.8 km) downstream before hitting another rock, which caused her to capsize and sink. All three people on board survived.

=== 17 November ===
List of shipwrecks: 17 November 1902
Ship	State	Description
Robert Wallace	United States	The steamer foundered 20 miles (32 km) from Superior, Wisconsin due to a broken stern pipe.

=== 18 November ===
List of shipwrecks: 18 November 1902
Ship	State	Description
Bosnia		The steamer sank in the Black Sea. 150 drowned.
Greenock	United Kingdom	The steamer collided with the steamer Ape (flag unknown) near Gourock Bay and Cloch Point in the River Clyde. One man missing.

=== 19 November ===
List of shipwrecks: 19 November 1902
Ship	State	Description
Raven	United States	The steamer struck a submerged log destroying her prop causing her to drift onto a reef and capsizing. Later righted and refloated and taken to Vancouver, British Columbia.

=== 20 November ===
List of shipwrecks: 20 November 1902
Ship	State	Description
Knud	Denmark	The steamer was sunk in a collision with Swaledale (United Kingdom) off the Black Middens in the Tyne River. Her captain and six crewmen died. Four were rescued.
South Dakota	United States	The passenger paddle steamer was lost to fire at Pembina, North Dakota.

=== 22 November ===
List of shipwrecks: 22 November 1902
Ship	State	Description
Alma	United States	The steamer was sunk in a collision with Echo (United States) at New Orleans, a total loss.

=== 23 November ===
List of shipwrecks: 23 November 1902
Ship	State	Description
Chili	United States	The steamer was damaged in a collision with Oswego (United States) in the Ballards Reef channel in the Detroit River and was beached to prevent sinking.
Jacob Heatherington	United States	The laid up steamer sank as a result of a rusted through supply pipe at Coal Haven, Kentucky. Raised and repaired.

=== 25 November ===
List of shipwrecks: 25 November 1902
Ship	State	Description
Quito	United States	The steamer sprung a leak off Lorain, Ohio on Lake Erie and drifted ashore. Deemed a total loss.

=== 28 November ===
List of shipwrecks: 28 November 1902
Ship	State	Description
Charles A. Silliman	United States	The passenger steamer was destroyed by fire between New Baltimore, New York and Troy, New York.
Lewis Pulver	United States	The tow steamer was sunk in a collision with Mahanoy (United States) off Bedloes Island, New York City.

=== 29 November ===
List of shipwrecks: 29 November 1902
Ship	State	Description
Bay City	United States	Bay City in 2019. The wooden schooner was driven against a pier in Alpena, Michigan, and abandoned. She sank in 11 feet (3.4 m) of water at 45.056139°N 83.426750°W.
Maxie Yost	United States	The steamer ran onto a bar and was swung into rocks causing her to sink at Chestnut Shoals on the Big Sandy River, a total loss.

=== 30 November ===
List of shipwrecks: 30 November 1902
Ship	State	Description
Celtic	United States	The schooner barge, under tow of H. E. Runnels (United States), was cut loose by her tow in a gale on Lake Huron. Her wreckage was found near Bloom Point on Cockburn Island. Lost with all eight crew.
Charles Hebard	United States	The steamer became unmanageable in a terrific gale and snowstorm after losing her rudder on Lake Superior and was abandoned by her crew. She was wrecked on Point Mamaise, a total loss. The crew made it to shore in boats.
Choctaw	United States	The paddle steamer sank at Greenwood, Mississippi.

== December ==
=== 3 December ===
List of shipwrecks: 3 December 1902
Ship	State	Description
Pell	United States	The sloop was sunk in a collision with Massasauga (United States) in the East River.
Progreso	United States	The steamer was destroyed at the Fulton Engineering and Shipbuilding Works, San Francisco, California when 400 barrels of fuel oil in a fuel oil tank being fitted exploded. Broken up later. Six shipyard employees and six crewmen killed.

=== 5 December ===
List of shipwrecks: 5 December 1902
Ship	State	Description
Saxon	United States	The steamer burned and sank at Pier 18 South, Philadelphia, Pennsylvania.

=== 9 December ===
List of shipwrecks: 9 December 1902
Ship	State	Description
Astral	United States	The tow steamer became disabled off Mount Desert Rock and the vessel drifted ashore and was wrecked. 17 of 18 crewmen made it ashore on Mount Desert Rock, the mess boy was found frozen to death. They were rescued after seven days by Clara Clarita (United States).
Pontiac	United States	The tug was sunk when pierced by ice between Albany, New York and Troy, New York.

=== 10 December ===
List of shipwrecks: 10 December 1902
Ship	State	Description
A. L. Lee	United States	The schooner sank in the south channel to Absecon Inlet between Heinz Pier and Steel Pier in eight feet (2.4 m) of water. The wreck was blown up with dynamite on 22–23 June 1905.

=== 11 December ===
List of shipwrecks: 11 December 1902
Ship	State	Description
Belle Wooster	United States	The 479-gross register ton schooner sank in the North Atlantic Ocean 60 nautical miles (110 km; 69 mi) east of Cape Ann, Massachusetts. All seven people on board survived.

=== 13 December ===
List of shipwrecks: 13 December 1902
Ship	State	Description
John C. Hall	United States	The steam barge sank in a severe storm near the Duck Islands on Lake Ontario. Lost with all hands, believed to be nine.

=== 14 December ===
List of shipwrecks: 14 December 1902
Ship	State	Description
Unknown barge	United States	The barge, under tow of Tormentor (United States), sank in a storm off Barnegat, New Jersey. crew rescued by Tormentor.

=== 16 December ===
List of shipwrecks: 16 December 1902
Ship	State	Description
Vixen	United States	The laid up passenger steamer broke loose from her dock at Covington, Kentucky and was swept downstream and sank when she struck the Southern Railroad bridge, a total loss.

=== 17 December ===
List of shipwrecks: 17 December 1902
Ship	State	Description
Frank A. Palmer	United States	Carrying a cargo of coal, the 274-foot (84 m), 2,014-gross register ton four-masted schooner collided with the schooner Louise B. Crary (United States) in Massachusetts Bay north of Cape Cod off Gloucester, Massachusetts, during a gale and sank in 360 feet (110 m) of water with the loss of 11 of the 21 crew members aboard the two ships.
Louise B. Crary	United States	Carrying a cargo of coal, the 267-foot (81 m), 2,231-gross register ton five-masted schooner collided with the schooner Frank A. Palmer (United States) in Massachusetts Bay north of Cape Cod off Gloucester, Massachusetts, during a gale and sank in 360 feet (110 m) of water with the loss of 11 of the 21 crew members aboard the two ships.

=== 18 December ===
List of shipwrecks: 18 December 1902
Ship	State	Description
Revolving Light	Norway	The three-masted full-rigged ship from Montevideo and, under tow, from IJmuiden for Hamburg, lost connection and was wrecked at Texel, the Netherlands. The 17 crew members were rescued. Remains of the ship were still visible 50 years later. In Canada a replica of the ship is built in the 2000s.

=== 23 December ===
List of shipwrecks: 23 December 1902
Ship	State	Description
Telephone	United States	The steamer struck a snag and sank in the Little Kanawha River below the Hughes River.

=== 24 December ===
List of shipwrecks: 24 December 1902
Ship	State	Description
Alexander McNeil	United States	The bark was wrecked on Pratas Reef in the China Sea.
Margaret	United States	The steamer struck the pier of the Ninth Street Bridge, Pittsburgh, Pennsylvania in the Monongahela River and sank taking two flats down with her. One person reported missing. Later raised.

=== 26 December ===
List of shipwrecks: 26 December 1902
Ship	State	Description
Stella	United States	The tow steamer filled and sank over night at the Atlantic Dock in Brooklyn, probably from the vessel catching under the dock on a rising tide. No leak found when she was raised.

=== 27 December ===
List of shipwrecks: 27 December 1902
Ship	State	Description
Hock White	United States	The steamer was sunk by ice 20 miles (32 km) below Dyersburg, Tennessee, a total loss.

=== Unknown date ===
List of shipwrecks: Unknown date in December 1902
Ship	State	Description
Broughton	United Kingdom	The full-rigged ship was wrecked whilst on a voyage from Hamburg, Germany to the Clyde.
Florence	United States	The clipper is believed to have sunk off Cape Flattery after failing to reach port
Grecian	United Kingdom	The fishing steamer disappeared at sea. It was last seen 25 December 265 miles (426 km) north west of the Inner Dowser Lightship.

== Unknown date ==
List of shipwrecks: Unknown date 1902
Ship	State	Description
A.B.C.F.M.	United States	After being abandoned in July 1900 at a slip on the Kinnickinnic River in Milwaukee, Wisconsin, following years of service as a lumber carrier and later as a "floating church" and "gospel ship", the three-masted schooner was towed out onto Lake Michigan and scuttled sometime in mid 1902.
Annie Wesley	United States	The fishing schooner was last seen off Cape Sable Island on 17 December. Lost with all 14 crew.
Chance	New Zealand	Chance The ship was driven ashore at Bluff.
Coggeswell	United States	The barge sank in the Hudson River sometime in early 1902. Some wreckage was removed by grappling on 23 July 1906.
George Rennie	Australia	George Rennie The paddle steamer was scuttled to form a breakwater at Picnic Bay, Queensland, Australia.
Louis Walsh	United States	The 1,433-ton ship broke loose from her moorings during a gale and was washed ashore on the spit at Dutch Harbor, District of Alaska. She was stripped and abandoned, and her hull eventually broke up.
Nor'West	United States	While laid up for the winter, the 8-gross register ton, 35.4-foot (10.8 m) schooner dragged her anchor during either the winter of 1901–1902 or the winter of 1902–1903 and was blown so far inland at the head of "Wrangell Bay" in the District of Alaska – probably Wrangell Bay (57°01′N 156°31′W) on Kodiak Island but possibly the harbor at Wrangell in Southeast Alaska – that she could not be relaunched. She was declared a total loss and was stripped and abandoned.
SMS S42	Imperial German Navy	The torpedo boat sank after a collision. She was refloated, repaired, and returned to service.
Sharp	United States	The tug burned and sank in the Hudson River sometime in early 1902. Some wreckage was removed by grappling on 23 July 1906.
