= Downhauler =

Studio album by Marc Douglas Berardo
- Released: 2011
- Recorded: Horizon Studio, West Haven, Connecticut and Circle Sessions Stratford, Connecticut April 2008 through March 2010
- Genre: folk, country, singer-songwriter
- Label: Milo Productions
- Producer: Dick Neal and Marc Douglas Berardo

Marc Douglas Berardo chronology
Harbor (2005)	Downhauler (2011)	Whalebone (2013)

Downhauler is the fifth studio release by Rhode Island–based singer-songwriter Marc Douglas Berardo. All songs were written by Berardo with the exception of Quiet Places which was co-written with Abbie Gardner, Laurie McCallister and Carolann Solebello of Red Molly.

Downhauler was ranked No. 20 on the Folk DJ-L radio list of Top Albums and Songs of 2011.

In the review of the album, Roger Zee of WorkingMusician.com had this to say, "These songs examine the dreams and hopes that motivate us all."

== Track listing ==
1. "Ruby"
2. "Something Real (Neal and Jenny)"
3. "Smokegun Jack Daydreams"
4. "Cuba 1953"
5. "Havana"
6. "Better Days"
7. "Everything Will Be Alright"
8. "Ruby Reprise"
9. "Passing Through"
10. "Quiet Places" With Red Molly
11. "Thinking It Over"

== Personnel ==
=== Musicians ===
- Marc Douglas Berardo – vocals, background vocals, acoustic guitar, nylon classical guitar, percussion
- Dick Neal – electric guitars, banjo
- Paulie Triff – drums, percussion
- Scott LeBish – drums
- Arturo Baguer – bass, Cuban bass
- Jordan Jancz – bass
- Larry Deming – violin, harmonium
- Liam Bailey – banjo, fiddles
- Chris Berardo – vocals, harmonica, tambourine, percussion, background vocals, harmony vocals
- Vic Steffans – electric piano, keys, keyboard, Hammond organ B-3, drums
- Laurie McCallister – vocals, banjo
- Carolann Solebello – vocals
- Abbie Gardner – Dobro, vocals
- Pete Szymanksi – bass
- Jim Kimball – accordion

=== Production ===
- Produced by: Dick Neal and Marc Douglas Berardo
- Engineered by: Dick Neal and Vic Steffens
- Mixed by: Dick Neal and Vic Steffens
- Mastered by: Vic Steffens at Horizon Studio, West Haven, Connecticut March 2010

=== Artwork ===
- Photography: Kim Mitchell
- Graphic Design and Layout: Marc Douglas Berardo and Chris Brown
