= Second Chance =

Second Chance, A Second Chance, The Second Chance, or 2nd Chance may refer to:

== Film ==
- Second Chance (1947 film), an American film noir
- Second Chance (1950 film), an American Christian film
- Second Chance (1953 film), an American film noir by Rudolph Maté
- Second Chance (1972 film), an American television film
- Second Chance (1976 film), a French film by Claude Lelouch
- Second Chance (1996 film), an American film by Lyman Dayton
- Second Chance (2005 film), an Australian television film written by John Misto
- The Second Chance, a 2006 drama film by Steve Taylor
- Second Chance (2010 film), a short drama film featuring Aml Ameen
- A Second Chance (2014 film), a Danish film
- A Second Chance (2015 film), a Filipino film
- 2nd Chance, 2022 documentary film directed by Ramin Bahrani, about the body armor company

== Literature ==
- Second Chance: Three Presidents and the Crisis of American Superpower, a 2007 book by Zbigniew Brzezinski
- "Second Chance" (short story), a 1979 story by Orson Scott Card
- 2nd Chance (Patterson novel), a 2003 Women's Murder Club novel by James Patterson
- Second Chance (Steel novel), a 2004 novel by Danielle Steel
- Second Chance, a 2012 Slayer Chronicles novel by Heather Brewer
- Second Chance, a 2007 novel by Jane Green
- Second Chance, a 1998 Left Behind: The Kids novel by Jerry B. Jenkins

== Music ==
- Second Chance (musical), a 2009 rock opera by Stéphane Prémont and Frédérick Desroches
- Second Chance (Melodifestivalen), a round in the Swedish competition Melodifestivalen
- Just Surrender, formerly A Second Chance, a 2000s American rock band

=== Albums ===
- Second Chance (El DeBarge album) or the title song, 2010
- Second Chance (Marc Douglas Berardo album) or the title song, 2000
- Second Chance (Noah album), 2014
- 2nd Chance (Karen Clark Sheard album) or the title song, 2002
- 2nd Chance (Oxide & Neutrino album) or the title song, 2007

=== Songs ===
- "Second Chance" (38 Special song), 1989
- "Second Chance" (Faber Drive song), 2007
- "Second Chance" (Shinedown song), 2008
- "Second Chance" (Tinchy Stryder song), 2010
- "Second Chance", by Caribou from Our Love, 2014
- "Second Chance", by Disclosure from Settle, 2013
- "Second Chance", by Liam Finn from I'll Be Lightning, 2007
- "Second Chance", by Paul Anka, 1984
- "Second Chance", by Peter Bjorn and John from Gimme Some, 2011
- "Second Chance", by Rend Collective Experiment from Homemade Worship by Handmade People, 2012
- "Second Chance (Don't Back Down)", by T-Pain from Oblivion, 2017

== Television ==
=== Programs ===
- Second Chance (1987 TV series), an American sitcom starring Matthew Perry
- Second Chance (2016 TV series), an American science fiction drama starring Rob Kazinsky
- Second Chance (game show), a 1977 American game show
- Second Chance (NTV drama series), a 2016–2018 Ugandan remake of El Cuerpo del Deseo
- El Cuerpo del Deseo or Second Chance, a 2005–2006 American Spanish-language telenovela
- Survivor: Second Chance or Survivor: Cambodia, a season of Survivor
- Second Chance!, a Nigerian comedy based on Mind Your Language

=== Episodes ===
- "Second Chance" (Batman: The Animated Series), 1994
- "Second Chance" (The Outer Limits), 1964
- "Second Chance!" (The Raccoons), 1989
- "A Second Chance" (Roseanne), 1997
- "The Second Chance" (The O.C.), 2005

== Other uses ==
- Second-chance employer, an employer that does not automatically disqualify people with prior criminal backgrounds
- Second Chance (body armor), a manufacturer of bullet-resistant vests
- Second Chance Act (2007), U.S. legislation concerning recidivism prevention
- Second Chance Program, a prison rehabilitation and detoxification program based on the works of L. Ron Hubbard
- Second-chance algorithm, a page-replacement algorithm in computer science
- Second Chance, a cloned Brahman bull
- 2nd Chance Motorsports, a 2010–2011 NASCAR team

== See also ==
- Second Chances (disambiguation)
