= Second Chance (Marc Douglas Berardo album) =

Studio album by Marc Douglas Berardo
- Released: 2000
- Recorded: Hayloft Studios, Milford, Connecticut
- Genre: folk, country, singer-songwriter
- Label: Hayloft Records

Marc Douglas Berardo chronology
Further on Tomorrow (1998)	Second Chance (2000)	As You Make Your Way (2003)

Second Chance is the second studio release by Rhode Island–based singer-songwriter Marc Douglas Berardo. The songs are original songs by Berardo with a few exceptions. Berardo collaborated with Michael Branden to write "After the Show"; a song about the various carnival and circus workers that spent the off season in Gibsonton, Florida. The title track "Second Chance" was written Don Ojo Dunaway and released in 1995 by Rich Mountain Music. Long Way home was written by Don Henley and Danny Kortchmar.

Jennifer Layton describing the songs in a review she wrote for Indie Music said, "Imagine Bruce Springsteen stories as Glen[sic] Frey would tell them. Jackson Browne would kill to cover some of these songs."

== Track listing ==
1. "Old Field Lane Intro"
2. "Useless"
3. "Ventura County Skies"
4. "Thin Air"
5. "Franklinville"
6. "After The Show"
7. "Burning"
8. "Downtown"
9. "Crow's Theme"
10. "Long Way Home"
11. "Into The Great Unknown"
12. "Second Chance"
13. "On The Last Day of Summer"

== Personnel ==
=== Musicians ===
- Marc Douglas Berardo – vocals, acoustic guitar, percussion, keyboards, harmonies, banjo on Second Chance
- Dick Neal – banjo, electric guitar, Dobro, mandolin
- Scott Berardo – Drums
- Pete Szymanski – bass guitars and Panasonic DA-7
- Nick Vitiello – percussion, congas, shaker, snare drum on Franklinville
- Chris Berardo – harmony vocals, harmonica, percussion
- Michael Branden – harmony vocals, acoustic guitar
- Mark Mirando – acoustic piano
- Charlene Maciejny – vocals on Downtown
- CJ Masters – pedal steel

=== Production ===
- Produced by: Pete Szymanski, and Marc Douglas Berardo. Burning by Dick Neal
- Mixed by: Pete Szymanski and Marc Douglas Berardo at Hayloft Studios assisted by Dick Neal December 1999 to May 2000
- Recorded by: Michael Branden at Hayloft Studios, Milford, CT.
- Mastered at 9West, Framingham, MA. June 2000

=== Artwork ===
- Photography: Kim Mitchell
- Design and Layout: Michael Brandon
