= Second Chances =

Second Chances may refer to:

== Music ==
- Second Chances album, a 2013 album by Jessy J
- "Second Chances", a song by Gregory Alan Isakov
- "Second Chances", a song by Imagine Dragons from the deluxe edition of Smoke + Mirrors

== Television and film ==
- Second Chances (film), a 1998 film by James Fargo
- Second Chances (American TV series), a 1993 American soap opera that aired on CBS
- Second Chances (Philippine TV series), a 2015 Philippine drama series that aired on GMA Network
- "Second Chances" (Star Trek: The Next Generation), a 1993 episode of Star Trek: The Next Generation
- "Second Chances" (Mercy Point), a 1999 episode of Mercy Point
- Second Chances, a 2010 television film by Jean-Claude Lord
- Second Chances, a 2013 Hallmark channel television film by Ernie Barbarash
- Second Chances, a 1995 television special of the PBS show Shining Time Station
- "Second Chances" (Arrow), an episode of Arrow

== Other uses ==
- Second Chances, a novel in the Dark-Hunter series
- Second Chances, a 1996–2000 comic strip featuring Nick and Kate, neighbors of Tank McNamara

== See also ==
- Second Chance (disambiguation)
