= Florence (clipper) =

1877 Sunken clipper

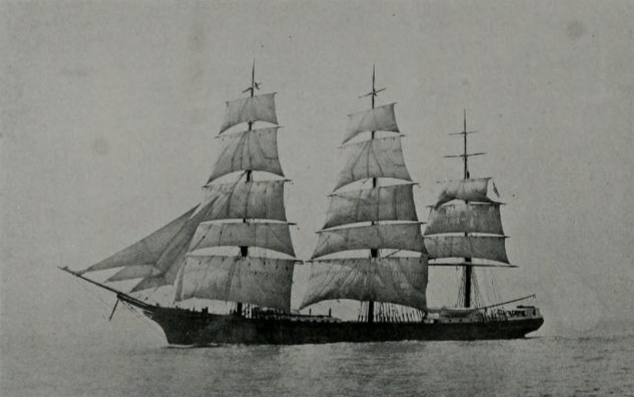
- Florence seen underway

History

United States
- Name: Florence
- Owner: 1877: Charles Davenport; 1890s: California Shipping Company
- Route: 1890s: San Francisco to Honolulu
- Builder: Goss & Sawyer, Bath, Maine
- Launched: October 1877
- Maiden voyage: New York, 20 April 1878; San Francisco, 6 August 1878
- Fate: Disappeared, December 1902

General characteristics
- Tonnage: 1684 tons
- Length: 225 ft (69 m)
- Beam: 41 ft (12 m)
- Depth: 26 ft (7.9 m)
- Propulsion: 3 skysails

Florence was an American clipper built in 1877 to transport goods between California and cities along the Atlantic coast. She disappeared in 1902, and is believed to have sunk off the coast of Washington.

== Description ==
The Florence was a three-masted clipper, built by Goss & Sawyer in Bath, Maine to carry goods from Atlantic cities to California. The ship was 225 feet (69 m) long, 41 feet (12 m) wide, and had a depth of 26 feet (7.9 m) with a gross tonnage of 1684 tons. The Florence was named after the daughter of its first captain and carried a figurehead of the namesake. Her construction was rated as being extraordinarily sturdy due to the supervision and material used during her construction.

== History ==
The Florence was launched in October 1877, and left New York on 20 April 1878 for San Francisco, arriving on 4 August as part of her maiden voyage. The trip took 106 days, as all vessels had to travel around Cape Horn. For the next several decades, the clipper transported various raw materials between ports in the Pacific and Atlantic oceans.

By the late 1890s, demand for coast-to-coast trading began to drop, which left many ships without a purpose. The clipper briefly idled, before she was bought by the California Shipping Company to carry lumber from Puget Sound to Honolulu.

On 3 December 1902, the ship left Tacoma, Washington carrying coal to Honolulu. Heavy wind were reported in her area, and she is believed to have sunk when the vessel never arrived. It is theorized that the ship foundered with all hands off the coast of Cape Flattery alongside HMS Condor and the steamer Matteawan. The theory is supported by the discovery of one of her life preservers a year later.

However, Neil and Betty Carey reported recovering Florence anchor's just north of Kindakun Point, on Graham Island on the west coast of Haida Gwai (Canada) in the late 1960s. They also found several deadeyes, copper nails, a piece of mast, spar hoops and a futtock band. The book records Betty receiving oral history from Haida Chief Solomon Wilson that his half-brother Isaac found the wreck in spring 1903.
