= Chance (1786 London ship) =

British merchant and slave schooner 1786–1789

History

Great Britain
- Name: Unknown
- Launched: 1779
- Acquired: 1786
- Renamed: Chance (1786)
- Fate: Upset 28 March 1789

General characteristics
- Tons burthen: 70 (bm)
- Sail plan: Schooner

Chance was a schooner launched in Virginia in 1779, probably under another name. From 1786 she traded between London and Africa, though she may have traded in enslaved people within African waters. A tornado on 28 March 1789 upset her. Her crew saved themselves, but abandoned her and the 33 captives on board. By chance, another vessel later was able to rescue the 11 captives by then still alive.

== Career ==
Chance first appeared in Lloyd's Register (LR) in 1786.

Year	Master	Owner	Trade	Source & notes
1786	Anderson	Miles & Co.	London–Africa	LR
1787	Anderson; Proudfoot	Miles & Co.	London–Africa	LR; raised and repairs 1787

In 1787 she reportedly reached the Îles de Los before returning to Portsmouth and then Gravesend on 10 July. On 28 August she again sailed for Africa. By 16 August 1788 she had returned to Gravesend. On 1 October she sailed for Africa.

== Fate ==
Chance, Proudfoot, master, was off Dixcove when a tornado on 28 March 1789 pushed her on her side. The crew saved themselves in her boats.

When Chance upset she was carrying 33 captives and 50 ounces of gold dust. All the whites saved themselves by taking to her boats. They expected that Chance would go to pieces, drowning any captives still alive as the captives were chained below decks. Chance drifted out to sea. Fifty-seven hours later she was 20 leagues from where she had upset when Hinde, Harvey, master, came upon her. Captain Thomas Harvey sent a boat and some men to investigate the hulk. When the men heard groaning they sent for axes and were able to cut holes in Chance through which they were able to rescue 11 still living captives. Some of these captives were chained to dead captives and the sailors had to cut the arms and legs off the dead to free the still living. A few days later Chance drifted on shore between the towns of Exim and Princess. Inhabitants from the two towns salvaged the gold and fought over the wreckage.
