= Chance, Kentucky =

Unincorporated community in Kentucky, United States

Chance
- Unincorporated community
- Location within the state of Kentucky Chance (the United States)
- Coordinates: 36°58′31″N 85°19′29″W
- Country: United States
- State: Kentucky
- County: Adair
- Elevation: 1,017 ft (310 m)
- Time zone: UTC-6 (Central (CST))
  - Summer (DST): UTC-5 (CDT)
- GNIS feature ID: 507683

Chance is an unincorporated community in Adair County, Kentucky, United States. Its elevation is 1017 feet (310 m).
