= Chance (name) =

Chance is an English masculine given name and a surname. The given name is of Middle English origin, meaning "good fortune". There are several variants. The surname is of Old French origin, from cheance, also Middle English chea(u)nce (meaning "fortune", "luck"). The oldest public record of the surname dates to 1310 in Essex. People with the name Chance include:

== Given name ==
Chance
- Pronunciation: chans
- Gender: Male

Origin
- Meaning: "Good fortune"
- Region of origin: England

Other names
- Related names: Chanse, Chantz, Chanze, Czance, Chaunce, Chauncey, Chauncy, Choncey and Chancey

- Chance Adams (born 1994), American baseball player
- Chance Bateman (born 1981), Australian rules footballer
- Chance the Rapper (born 1993), American rapper, born Chancelor Bennett
- Chance Browne (born 1948), American cartoonist
- Chance Campbell (born 1999), American football player
- Chance Carter (born 2001), Canadian soccer player
- Chance Fry (born 1964), American soccer player
- Chance Kelly, American actor
- Chance Mock (born 1981), American football player
- Chance Myers (born 1987), American soccer player
- Chance Perdomo (1996–2024), English-American actor
- Chance Phelps (1984–2004), United States Marine
- Chance Ruffin (born 1988), American baseball player
- Chance Sanford (born 1972), American baseball player
- Chance Sisco (born 1995), American baseball player
- Chance Thomas, American music composer
- Chance M. Vought (1890–1930), American businessman and aerospace engineer
- Chance Warmack (born 1991), American football player
- Chance Waters (born 1987), Australian rapper, songwriter, record producer

== Surname ==
- Chance (surname)

== Fictional characters ==
=== In film ===
- Chance the Gardener, aka Chauncey Gardiner, in the novel and film Being There
- Chance, an American Bulldog in the movies Homeward Bound: The Incredible Journey and Homeward Bound 2
- Agent Nina Chance, Secret Service agent in the 1997 film Murder at 1600, played by Diane Lane
- Chance Boudreaux, main character of the film Hard Target, played by Jean-Claude Van Damme
- Richard Chance, United States Secret Service agent with the Treasury Department, main character in 1985 film To Live and Die in L.A. (film)
- Chance Wayne, main character from the Tennessee Williams play Sweet Bird of Youth, portrayed by Paul Newman in the 1962 film adaption
- John T. Chance, in the 1959 film Rio Bravo (film)
- Chance Buckman, main character in the 1968 film Hellfighters (film), played by John Wayne

=== In other media ===
- Jack T. Chance, DC Comics character
- Christopher Chance, another DC Comics character' who uses the alias Human Target
- Chance "T-Bone" Furlong, a protagonist in the animated series SWAT Kats: The Radical Squadron
- Chance Chancellor, in the soap opera The Young and the Restless
- Chance Charming, Cinderella's husband in Chris Colfer's The Land of Stories
