= SS Bee =

History

Australia
- Name: SS Bee
- Owner: Watson Ferry Service, Sydney (1884-?); Robert Hayles Snr., Townsville (1899-1901)
- Completed: 1884
- Out of service: 1901
- Fate: Wrecked 17 March 1901

General characteristics
- Type: Wooden passenger/cargo steamship
- Tonnage: 100 NRT
- Capacity: 100 passengers

SS Bee was an Australian wooden steamship built in 1884 and wrecked in 1901. She earned historical notability as the first of Robert Hayles' ferry fleet. Hayles' Magnetic Island ferry service, eventually operated under the business name Hayles Magnetic Island Pty. Ltd., served Magnetic Island for over 80 years and eventually came to operate a number of passenger and cargo services through ports around northern Australia.

== History ==
Bee was built in 1884 in Newcastle, New South Wales, by Scott Bros, for the Watson Ferry Service, who operated her on their Manly-to-Sydney ferry service from 1884.

Robert Hayles Snr., the owner of a resort on Picnic Bay, Magnetic Island, purchased Bee in 1899 to transport holiday makers between Townsville and Picnic Bay. The vessel sank in October 1900 but was refloated and continued service for Hayles.

On 17 March 1901, Bee cast off from Picnic Bay Jetty in heavy seas. As she attempted to depart, her chain steerage gear became jammed. Unable to maneuver properly, she was taken broadside by the waves and washed up on the nearby beach at Picnic Bay. Efforts to save her failed, and within two days she was deemed unsalvageable.

== Wreck ==
Bee′s wreck lies on the beach at the mouth of the unnamed creek at the western end of Picnic Bay. It generally is not visible, but sometimes can be seen following extreme weather events, which erode sand from the beach and reveal it.
