= Magnetic Battery =

Naval fortification in Queensland, Australia

Coordinates: 19.12363°S 146.87146°E

- Magnetic Island, Australia
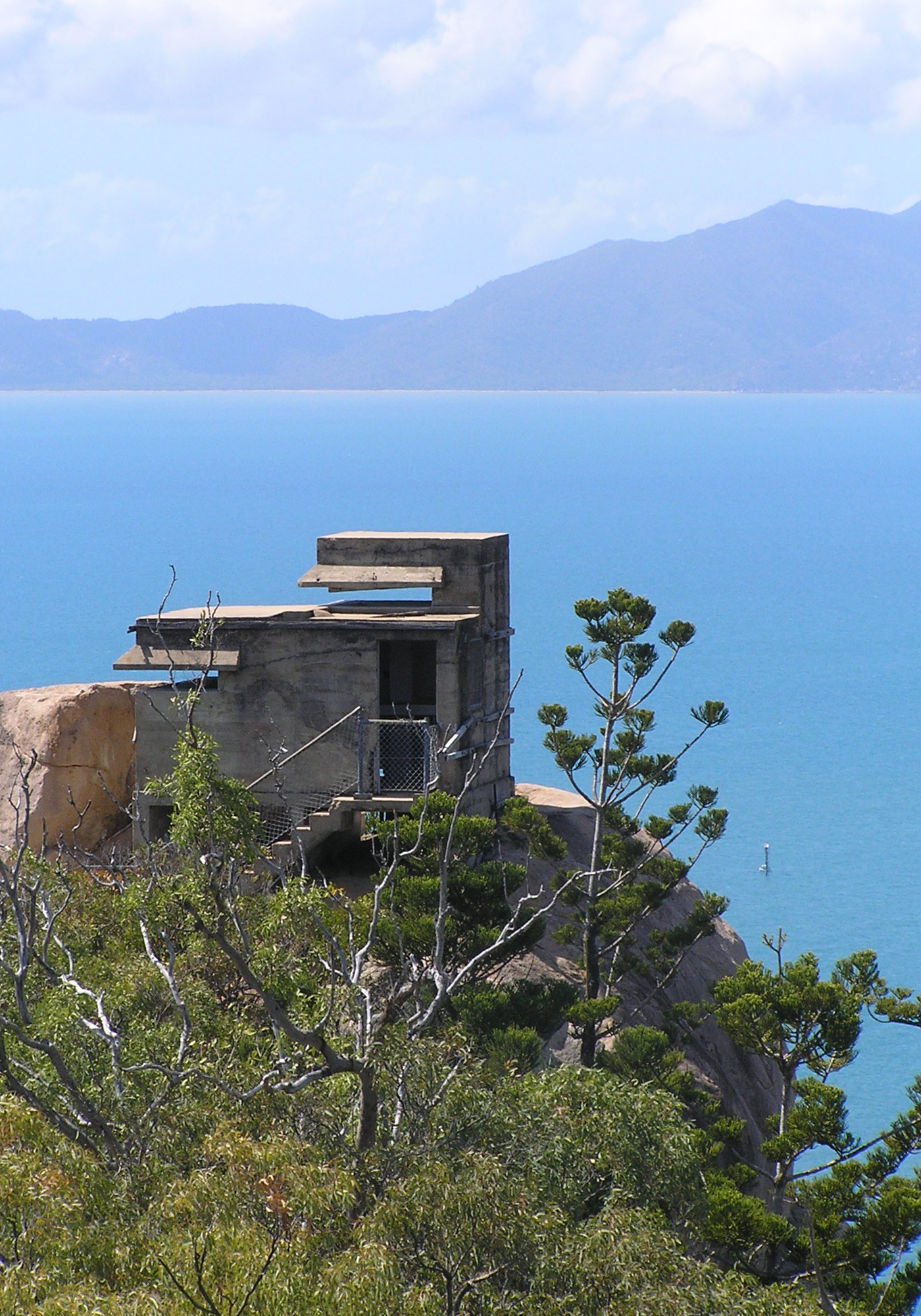
- Observation Post overlooking Cleveland Bay, Magnetic Battery

Site information
- Type: Coastal defence installation
- Owner: Queensland Parks and Wildlife Service
- Controlled by: Australia
- Open to the public: Yes

Site history
- Built: 1942-1943
- Built by: Queensland Main Roads Commission
- In use: 1943-1946
- Demolished: 1946

Garrison information
- Past commanders: Battery Commander Major Nichol

The Magnetic Battery, Fort War or The Forts, as it is commonly referred, is a former Royal Australian Navy artillery battery in the hinterland of Horseshoe. Florence and Arthur Bays on Magnetic Island. Built in 1942/1943, the battery operated from July 1943 until the end of World War II. The remains of the facility are now maintained by Queensland Parks and Wildlife Service as part of the Magnetic Island National Park and are open to visitors year round.

During its operation the battery consisted of a two searchlights in Horseshoe and Florence Bays, a radar screen in the hinterland of Arthur Bay, a permanent living encampment and a Command Post, Observation Post and two Gun Emplacements overlooking Cleveland Bay. While the majority of the buildings no longer remain, the fortified concrete command post, observation post, munitions bunker and gun emplacements still remain along with the foundations of many of the buildings within the living encampment. These remains form part of the Queensland Parks and Wildlife Service's The Forts Walk, a popular 3.8 km environmental and heritage walk for visitors to Magnetic Island.

== History ==
In 1942 Townsville became an important base in Australia for troops from Australia and the United States. Cleveland Bay, between Magnetic Island and Townsville, also became an important assembly point for supplies and military boats alike, with the bay was providing temporary anchorage for up to 40 vessels assembling for convoys. To ensure the assembling fleets were able to be coordinated and safe from enemy attack, a large military facility, The Magnetic Battery was built on Magnetic Island.

Construction began on September 28, 1942, and the facility was built to a plan of a standard port war signal station by the Queensland Main Roads Commission. A road to the facility was constructed by a team of 25 men firstly constructing a road from Arcadia to what is now the Radical Bay turnoff on Horseshoe Bay Road, then continuing up into the hinterland ending at the camouflaged mountain-top facility. Major Tom Sherman, a fortress engineer working on the project, on the advice of Tom Wetherell, a visiting officer from Townsville's Kissing Point barracks, extended the road onto Florence Bay as Wetherell "could not accept the [Japanese] would not have known all about it, the road stood out like a sore thumb and ended abruptly in a heap of camouflage nets and netting". The command post, observation post and gun emplacements were all heavily camouflaged with local foliage, camouflage netting and false rocks, constructed by laying concrete over a wire mesh structure to resemble the local granite boulders.

Most construction materials for the facilities were shipped to Arcadia by lighters or Hayles Ferry Service and transported up to the battery by road. The guns and materials for the Horseshoe Bay searchlight were shipped to Horseshoe Bay. The fortified structures were constructed of 12-inch-thick (300 mm) reinforced concrete poured into custom made forms on-site The facility was completed on 10 April 1943 and promptly began operation under the Australian Royal Navy. The radar screen in Arthur Bay was operated by the 13th Australian Radar Unit. Battery Commander Major Nichol commanded the artillery detachment of over 100 people responsible for the Magnetic Battery.

The two guns located at the Magnetic Battery, originally bound for Manila, were diverted to Magnetic Island by General McArthur along with a number of other guns that were requisitioned for use in Australian coastal batteries. The guns were based on the French Canon de 155mm GPF and had a set of rubber tyres at front of the gun that allowed it to be easily towed by a tractor. These were positioned at Magnetic Battery each on concrete Panama mount with a full outer ring of metal rail set into the concrete base allowing the guns a full 360-degree traverse. With a 26-foot (7.9 m) barrel the 155 mm gun could fire a 105-pound (48 kg) shell up to 18,000 yards (16,000 m) with a 6-foot (1.8 m) recoil. The guns were removed following the war but are one of the most controversial issues surrounding the history of Magnetic Battery. It is often contested whether either of the guns ever fired a shot. It is well known that the guns never fired on an enemy vessel; however, it is believed, although not confirmed, that the gun facing the harbour entrance did fire on a U.S. Navy PT boat "in mild astonishment" when it "arrived unannounced". It is also considered that four guns were deployed for emplacement at Magnetic Island during the war. However, in early 1999 a letter to the Townsville Bulletin from an Eric Hall claimed that his father, being the tug master of Townsville Port at the time, towed only two guns aboard a barge to Magnetic Island.

The two searchlights were manufactured by the Sperry Company and had dedicated diesel generators at both locations, one above White Lady, a rock formation in Horseshoe Bay, the other in Florence Bay. The fully automatic lights were 3000000 candle power, Carbon Arc and were capable of spotting aircraft at 30000 feet. 20 engineers supervised the operation of these searchlights.

Following the cease of hostilities in 1946 the battery was decommissioned. The guns used at the facility were disassembled, removed and shipped to Southern Queensland while construction materials from the demolished buildings as well as a large amount of remaining equipment, machinery and plumbing were auctioned to local residents.

== The Forts Walk ==
The remains of The Magnetic Battery form part of the popular 3.8 kilometres (2.4 mi) environmental and heritage trail, The Forts Walk. The walking trail begins at the turnoff of the road to Radical, Florence and Arthur Bays from Horseshoe Bay Road and winds through the hinterland following the approximate route the original track to the battery followed. The track provides excellent views over Arthur and Florence bays and native wildlife can often be seen alongside the track. Queensland Parks and Wildlife Service maintains the track and fortifications and has provided safe staircases to allow near-unrestricted access to the Command Post and Observation Post. The Command Post building is still an operational radio-repeater and navigational beacon, as such part of the second story of the building has been bricked off to house generators and radio equipment. The walking trail is a popular tourist activity and Magnetic Island Bus Service provides a regular bus service to the entrance to the trail.
