= Florence Bay, Queensland =

Florence Bay Magnetic Island, Queensland
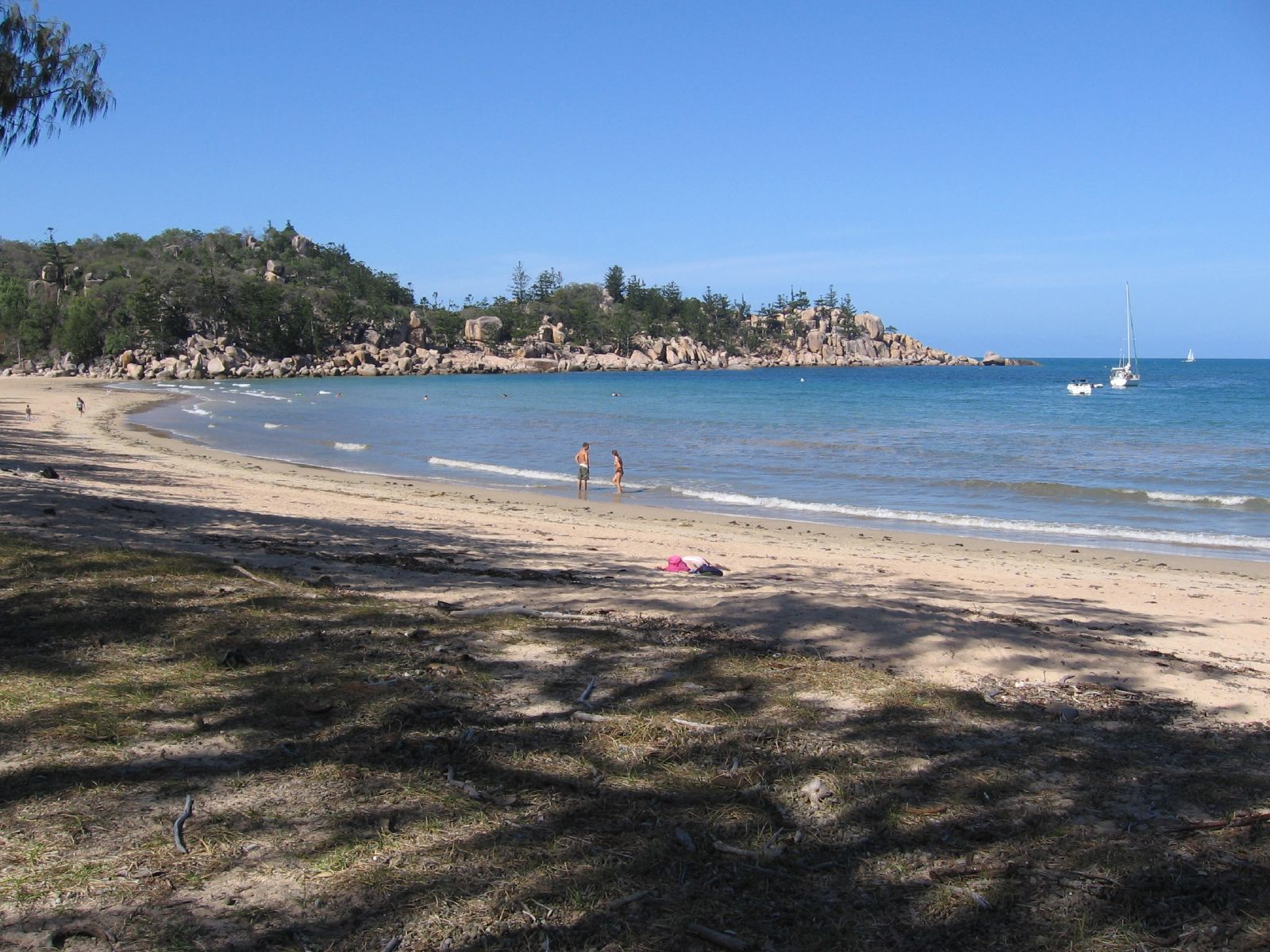

- Coordinates: 19.1194°S 146.8719°E
- Population: 0 (SAL 2016)
- Area: 3.5 km^{2} (1.4 sq mi)
- Time zone: AEST (UTC+10:00)
- Location: 6.8 km (4 mi) NE of Nelly Bay
- LGA(s): City of Townsville
- State electorate(s): Townsville
- Federal division(s): Herbert
Suburbs around Florence Bay:
Coral Sea	Coral Sea	Coral Sea
Horseshoe Bay	Florence Bay	Coral Sea
Horseshoe Bay	Arcadia	Coral Sea

Florence Bay is a suburb of Magnetic Island in the City of Townsville, Queensland, Australia. In the 2021 census, Florence Bay had "no people or a very low population".

== Geography ==
Florence Bay is on the north-east of Magnetic Island. Its rugged coastline creates a number of bays and headlands; the named features are:

- Horseshoe Bay (19.1114°S 146.8531°E)
- White Lady Rock (19.1083°S 146.8625°E)
- White Lady Bay (19.1058°S 146.8627°E)
- The Point, the northernmost point of Magnetic Island (19.1034°S 146.8626°E)
- Balding Bay (19.1098°S 146.8701°E)
- Radical Bay (19.1117°S 146.8747°E)
- Gowrie Bay (19.1159°S 146.8815°E)
- Florence Bay (19.1228°S 146.8809°E)
- Arthur Bay (19.1289°S 146.8770°E)

The Forts is a mountain (19.1230°S 146.8705°E) which rises to 182 metres (597 ft) above sea level.

Almost all of the locality, apart from a small area near the beach at Radical Bay, is within the Magnetic Island National Park.

== History ==
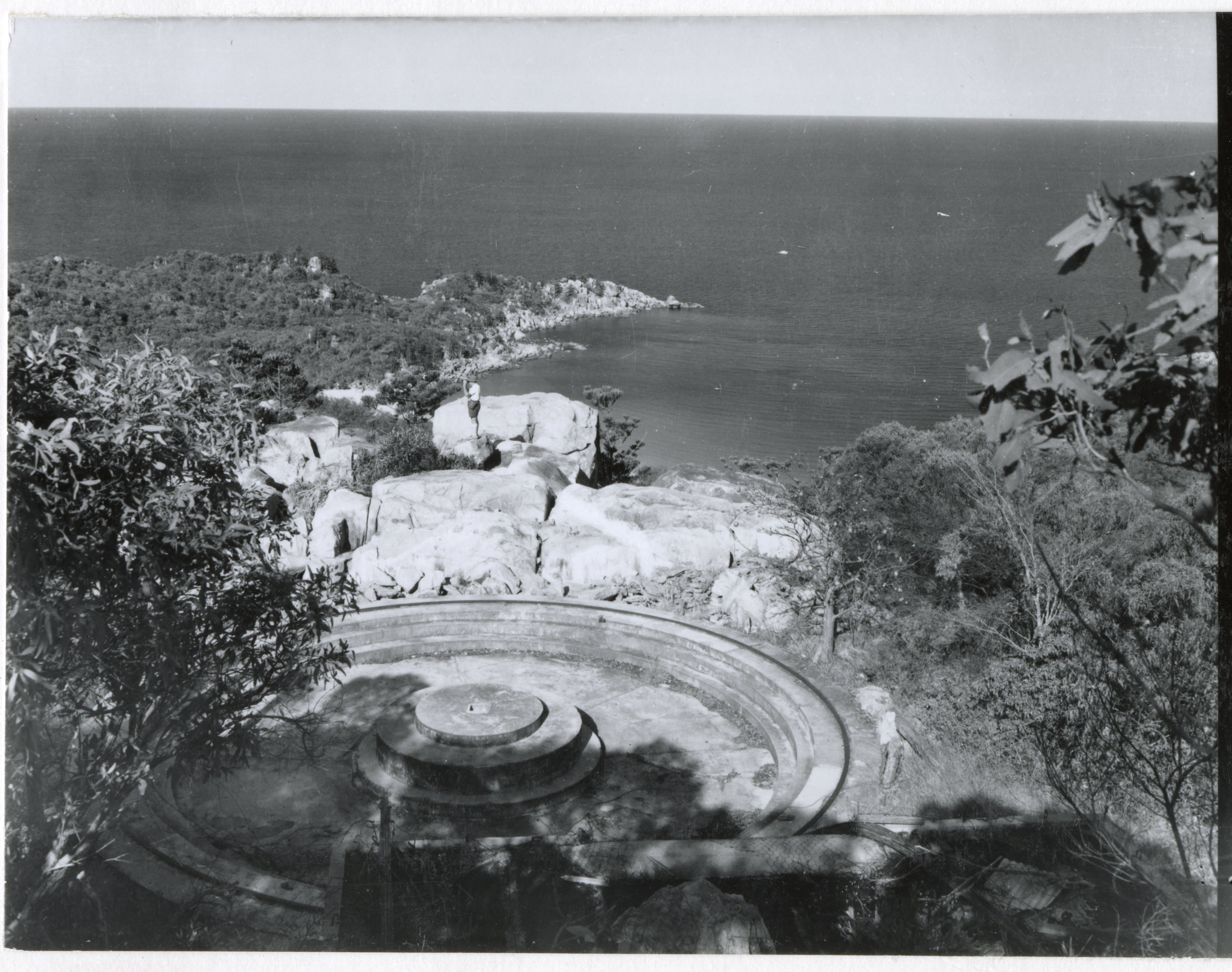
Remains of Gun Emplacement

Florence Bay was once the site of a private guesthouse reachable only by boat. One of these vessels, The 'Magnet' was carrying a picnic party from Florence Bay when it struck a reef on 25 March 1917 and was subsequently sunk.

After the demise of the guesthouse (reputably due to cyclone damage - unable to verify this), the property passed into the care of the Scout Association and became the main youth training facility in North Queensland.

A group within the Scout Association was recognised for their work to develop the facilities - including a storehouse, pump and well, parade ground, camping area and secluded chapel - by being awarded the title "Florence Bay Rover Crew". It is notable that much of their work was done by hand, including carrying bricks, cement, timber and equipment on their backs from either the main road or Radical Bay moorings.

The chapel, set high on the hillside, is consecrated and contains the cremated remains of one of North Queensland's most notable early Scouting leaders, "Beaver" Masters.

On the headland at the south end of Florence Bay there remains the base of a World War II searchlight tower, along with a command and anti-aircraft installation at The Forts above the bay.

== Demographics ==
In the 2016 census, Florence Bay had "no people or a very low population".

In the 2021 census, Florence Bay had "no people or a very low population".

== Attractions ==
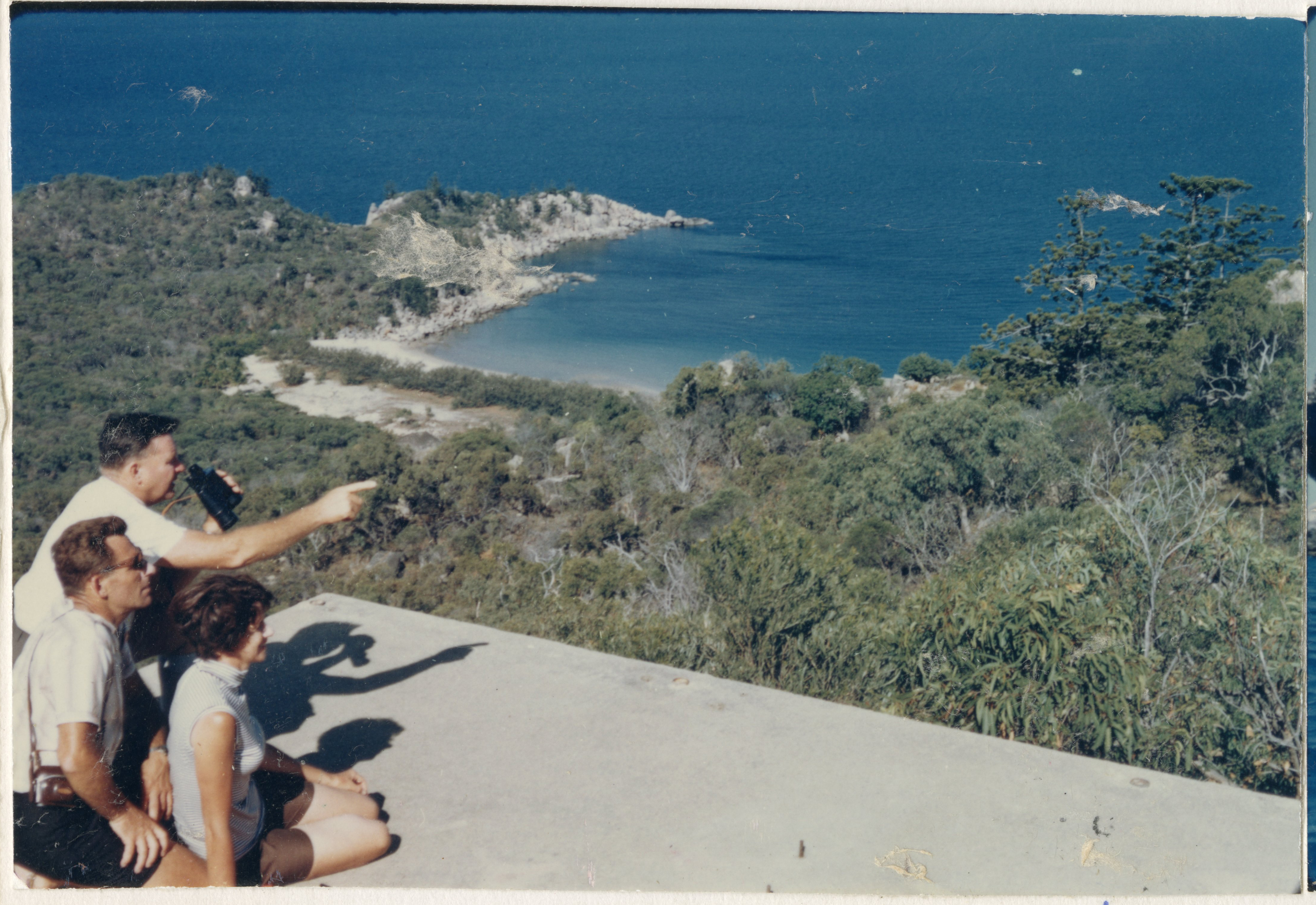
View from Forts to Florence Bay

The Forts Walk is a walking track in the Magnetic Island National Park with a number of points of interests:

- The Forts Observation Post (19.1237°S 146.8714°E)
- Searchlight Tower (19.1266°S 146.8823°E)
- Arthur Bay Lookout (19.1276°S 146.8768°E)

== Education ==
There are no schools in Florence Bay. The nearest government primary school is Magnetic Island State School in Nelly Bay on the island. The nearest government secondary school is Townsville State High School in Railway Estate on the Townsville mainland.
