= Picnic Bay Jetty =

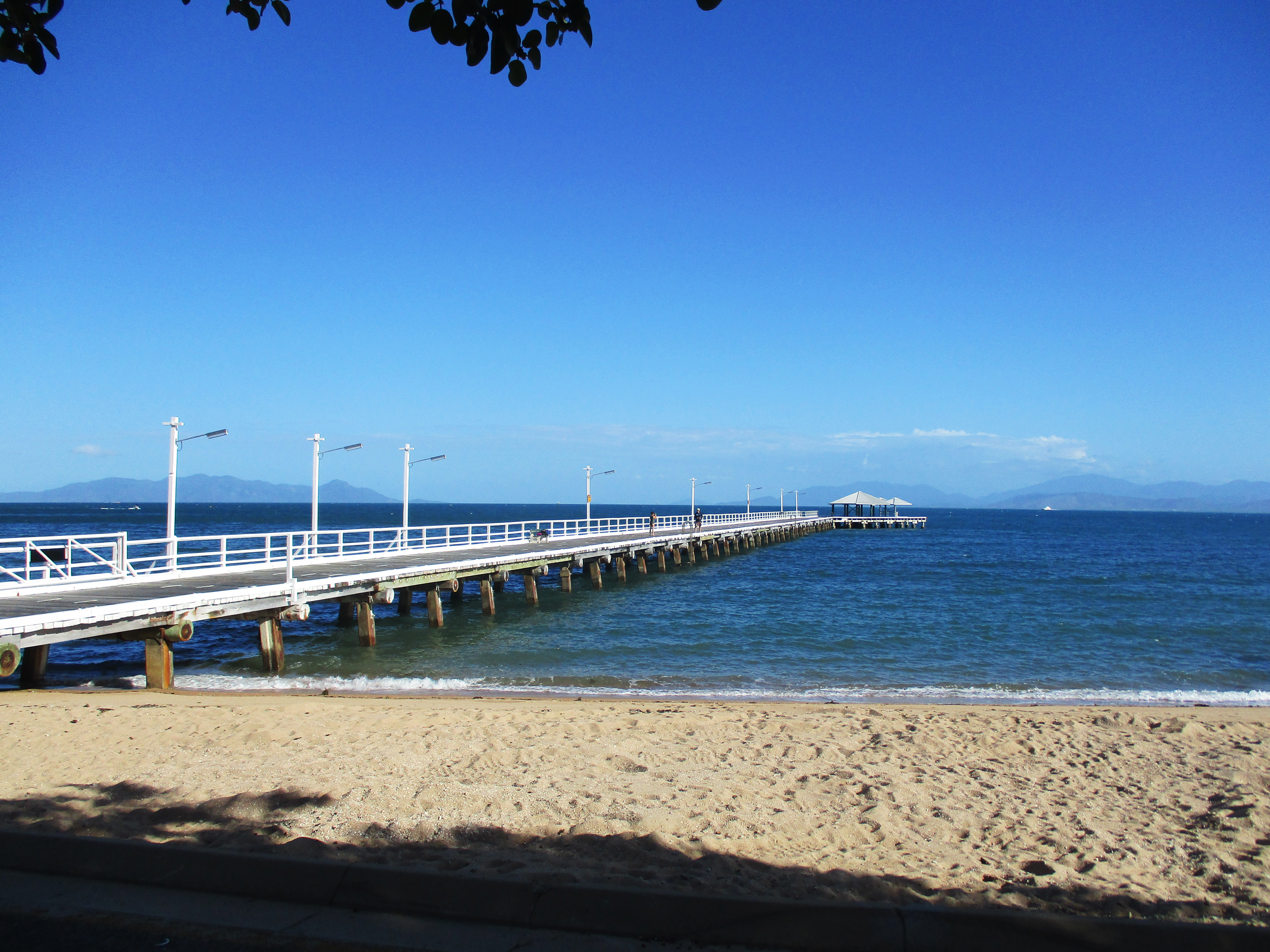
- Picnic Bay Jetty

- Location within Queensland Location within Australia
- 19.1809°S 146.8386°E
- Location: Esplanade, Picnic Bay, Magnetic Island, City of Townsville, Queensland, Australia

History
- Design period: 1940s–1960s (post-World War II)
- Built: 1959–1977

Queensland Heritage Register
- Official name: Picnic Bay Jetty
- Type: state heritage (built)
- Designated: 5 April 2004
- Reference no.: 602231
- Significant period: 1950s–1970s (fabric)
- Significant components: shed – shelter, furniture/fittings

Picnic Bay Jetty is a heritage-listed jetty at Esplanade, Picnic Bay, Magnetic Island, City of Townsville, Queensland, Australia. It was built from 1959 to 1977. It was added to the Queensland Heritage Register on 5 April 2004.

== History ==
The Picnic Bay Jetty appears to be the third jetty constructed on the site. A permit to construct the facility was issued in 1957 and the structure was completed about mid October 1959. The present jetty was constructed under a permit issued by the Queensland Department of Harbours and Marine. It was built using Federal funds and leased to Magnetic Island company Hayles Magnetic Pty Ltd. The company was associated with tourist ventures on Magnetic Island from 1898 and leased the present jetty from 1960 until 1981.

Tourism on Magnetic Island began with the Butler family who first settled on the Island in 1877. Harry Butler and his family established a small dairy, orchard and mixed farm in Picnic Bay. The family experimented with the planting of pineapples and after building small huts adjacent to their house the island became a favourite weekend and holiday destination for mainland people. The Butler family established an intermittent ferry service at the time they began their small tourist venture. Tourist development on the island began in earnest when Robert Hayles built an hotel at Picnic Bay in 1899. Hayles arrived on the Island in 1898 after working in the pastoral and mining industries in western Queensland. Later he owned a store and a hotel in Charters Towers. In 1898 Robert Hayles purchased the holiday facilities erected by the Butler family and constructed a two-storey hotel, dance hall and his own jetty west of that constructed by Harry Butler and close to the site of the present day jetty.

In March 1900 Robert Hayles applied for permission to construct a wooden jetty which would be six feet wide and 100 feet (30 m) long. Construction was approved by the Marine Department late in March 1900. The new jetty was damaged during Cyclone Leonta in 1903 and by 1910 was in poor condition. Correspondence indicates that Robert Hayles carried out extensive repairs to the structure.

Initially, on the mainland, the company operated from existing wharves and temporary landings in Ross Creek. In 1909 Robert Hayles was granted creek frontage on which to build a landing depot. A new twenty-year lease agreement, granting the Hayles Company a 30-foot (9.1 m) Flinders Street frontage to Ross Creek for the construction of another depot, was signed in 1925.

To facilitate his tourism venture Robert Hayles began a program of purchase or construction of small ferries. His first purchase, from Sydney, was a small steam ferry called the Bee. After the Bee was destroyed in a storm in 1901 Robert Hayles commissioned the construction of the 22 passenger Phoenix and later the Magnet. These boats were to be the foundation of a much larger Hayles fleet that eventually operated in places such as Cairns, Darwin, Townsville, Sydney and Canberra.

The introduction of a ferry service to Magnetic Island had a significant impact on the Island community. This was particularly so after the 1900 enforcement of compulsory education (first introduced in the Education Act 1875). The establishment of a regular Magnetic Island ferry service early in the twentieth century ensured that students could live on the island and travel to school each day. From this point the permanent population on the Island began to grow and more commercial businesses were established.

The Hayles family tourism business continued to prosper and on 20 June 1910 Eustace Robert (Bob) Hayles was granted a permit to construct a jetty at Picnic Bay. While it is possible that this permit was for a second jetty it is unlikely that the Hayles Company waited six years to replace the jetty damaged in the 1903 cyclone.

A letter dated 1 February 1917 from the Townsville Harbour Board to the Marine Department indicated that there were two jetties at Picnic Bay and one at Nelly Bay. These privately owned jetties were in poor condition and the Harbour Board suggested that no further private construction of landing stages should be allowed on the Island.

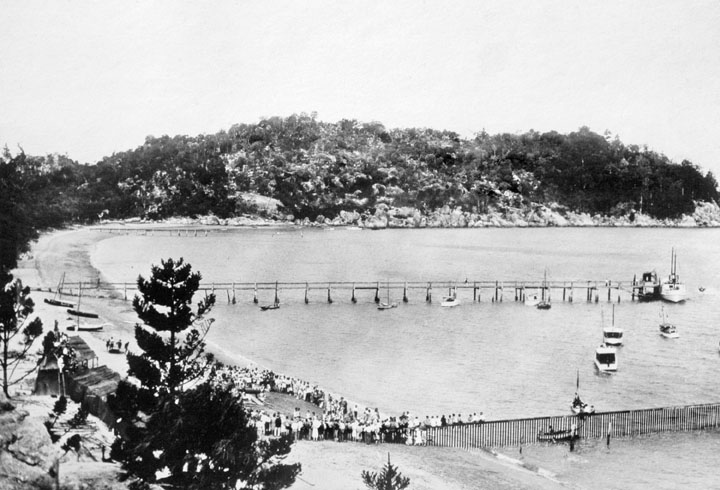
Picnic Bay Jetty, circa 1927

The Hayles' tourism business prospered and expanded. A new hotel was constructed at Picnic Bay after the first was destroyed by fire in 1911; a guesthouse and jetty were constructed at Arcadia together with tourism ventures at Nelly Bay and Horseshoe Bay. On 13 March 1922 the Hayles Company, Hayles Magnetic Island Pty Ltd, was formed with Bob Hayles appointed as chairperson. The company expanded to Cairns in 1924 where they provided a regular mail and cargo service between Cairns and Cooktown. The same year the company opened an office in Darwin. From there they provided a cargo service to outlying mission stations, lighthouses and to settlements along the Victoria and Daly Rivers. In August 1920, control of the Magnetic Island foreshore was vested in the Townsville Harbour Board. While this move gave control of jetties to the Harbour Board, the Board, in June 1925, adopted a policy not to erect jetties on Magnetic Island but rather to approve the erection of shipping facilities by private developers.

While the Hayles family company continued to expand with a fortnightly Cairns to Green Island Service opened in 1928 and the introduction of Brisbane River Cruises in 1936, the outbreak of World War II in 1939 saw shipping operations cease when the Australian military requisitioned the company fleet. The facilities at Picnic Bay were also taken over as a rest and recreation camp for service personnel.

There was a period of expansion and upgrading of facilities after the company property was returned to the Hayles family in 1945. Roads, buildings and jetties were upgrades and access to jetties dredged both on Magnetic Island and in other locations. In 1957 the Townsville Harbour Board approved the construction a new jetty at Picnic Bay. Tenders were called on 15 January 1959 and the jetty, constructed by John Holland (Constructions) Pty Ltd, was completed about mid October 1959.

The Commonwealth Aid Marine Works Trust Fund, at a cost of £43,000, financed construction. It was leased to Hayles Magnetic for 20 years during which time the company was responsible for the maintenance of the structure. The shelter shed at the end of the jetty was constructed under a Community Employment Program through the Townsville City Council in 1977.

The jetty was damaged during Cyclone Althea on Christmas Eve 1971 but remained structurally sound. At the end of the lease in 1981 the Picnic Bay Jetty Maintenance Fund was established with Hayles Magnetic the major user of the facility. The Fund, which generated resources through the collection of berthing fees, provided income for jetty maintenance.

By 1984, although the company no longer had a lease on the jetty, it was berthing up to 3,640 times compared to 1,150 other berthings with a total of 250,000 to 300,000 people using the jetty annually.

In November 1985 the Townsville Harbour Board sought approval from the Department of Harbours and Marine to construct a shelter shed on the jetty. Plans, prepared by the Townsville City Council, indicated that the original location of the structure was slightly altered to allow better access for passengers.

Apart from being a point of arrival and departure from the Island, the jetty has always been a significant place for the Magnetic Island community. They have utilised it for fishing and as a place to walk for recreation or exercise and to sit looking across Cleveland Bay to the vista of Castle Hill and the Townsville skyline. The jetty is also frequently used as a mooring place for small yachts and fishing vessels.

In 2001 it was announced that when new harbour facilities at Nelly Bay, Magnetic Island were completed the Picnic Bay Jetty would be removed as soon as the structure became obsolete to requirements. The Magnetic Island Historical Association, the North Queensland Conservation Council and Magnetic Island community members became concerned about the proposed demolition of the jetty.

On Sunday 8 July 2001, 1500 people from Townsville and Magnetic Island rallied on the Picnic Bay Jetty asking that the jetty be saved. This initial rally was followed by a series of news articles, letters to the Bulletin, letters to the Minister for Transport and a nomination to the Queensland Heritage Register.

Members of the Island community advised Townsville Cultural Heritage staff that they had already established an "Interim Management Committee" to oversee the ongoing care of the jetty if the Queensland Government was no longer prepared to maintain the structure.

== Description ==
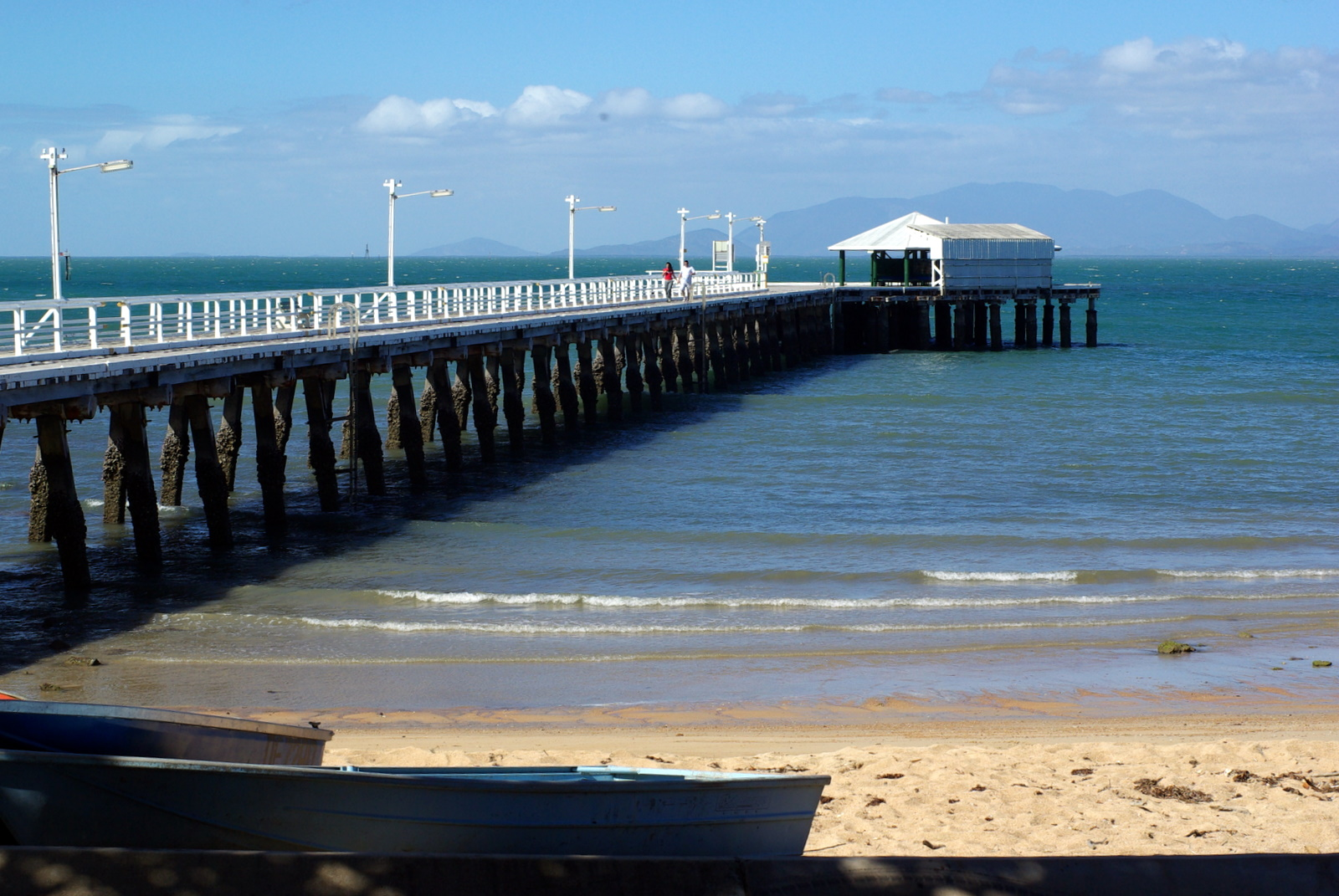
Bridge supports revealed at low tide, 2008

The jetty is located within Picnic Bay. It extends into the Bay from the Esplanade where Yule Street meets the beach.

The jetty was initially 800 feet (240 m) long; however, the 1977 extensions increased the length by about twenty feet.

160 square concrete piers, installed by a cantilever pile driver, are evenly spaced along the length of the jetty. Round piers encased in concrete were used in the construction of the assembly area at the end of the jetty.

The jetty structure is made up of round timber beams topped with wide timber decking. A raised walkway, which runs along one side of the jetty, has timber handrails along both sides. The remainder of the jetty is used as a driveway for luggage and emergency vehicles meeting the ferry. There is no safety rail along the outer side of the jetty.

The walkway is lit with six evenly spaced fluorescent lights. Lighting is also located in the shelter sheds at the end of the jetty.

The sheltered area at the end of the jetty is made up of three structures. One shed, which appears to be older, is a southeast facing skillion structure of corrugated iron. The north west wall is enclosed to provide shelter from the weather. A second shed is centrally located at the end of the Jjetty. This square structure has a hipped roofline of aluminum. The covered area is split into four by central walls which have been painted with murals by children from Magnetic Island State School. Seats are located along each of these walls. A third sheltered area, which may have been part of an earlier shelter, is attached to the central structure. This area is the walkway to the main access stairway to the ferry.

== Heritage listing ==
Picnic Bay Jetty was listed on the Queensland Heritage Register on 5 April 2004 having satisfied the following criteria.

The place is important in demonstrating the evolution or pattern of Queensland's history.

Picnic Bay Jetty, constructed by October 1959, is at least the third jetty constructed on this site. Leased by the Hayles Company in 1960 this jetty, and earlier jetties, has been linked with the Hayles family company on Magnetic Island since 1898.

The place has a strong or special association with a particular community or cultural group for social, cultural or spiritual reasons.

The community values the Picnic Bay Jetty both for its contribution to the economic development of Magnetic Island as a significant tourist destination and for the jetty's role in the commercial, family and recreational life of the Island community. The importance of the jetty to the island community was recently demonstrated through the proposal to set up a management committee to assume responsibility for the structure once it becomes obsolete to requirements.

The place has a special association with the life or work of a particular person, group or organisation of importance in Queensland's history.

The present jetty is evidence of the significant contribution made by the Hayles Company, through the company's development of Magnetic Island as a major tourist location, to the Queensland tourism industry.
