= Fort Complex, Magnetic Island =

Fort Complex Magnetic Island
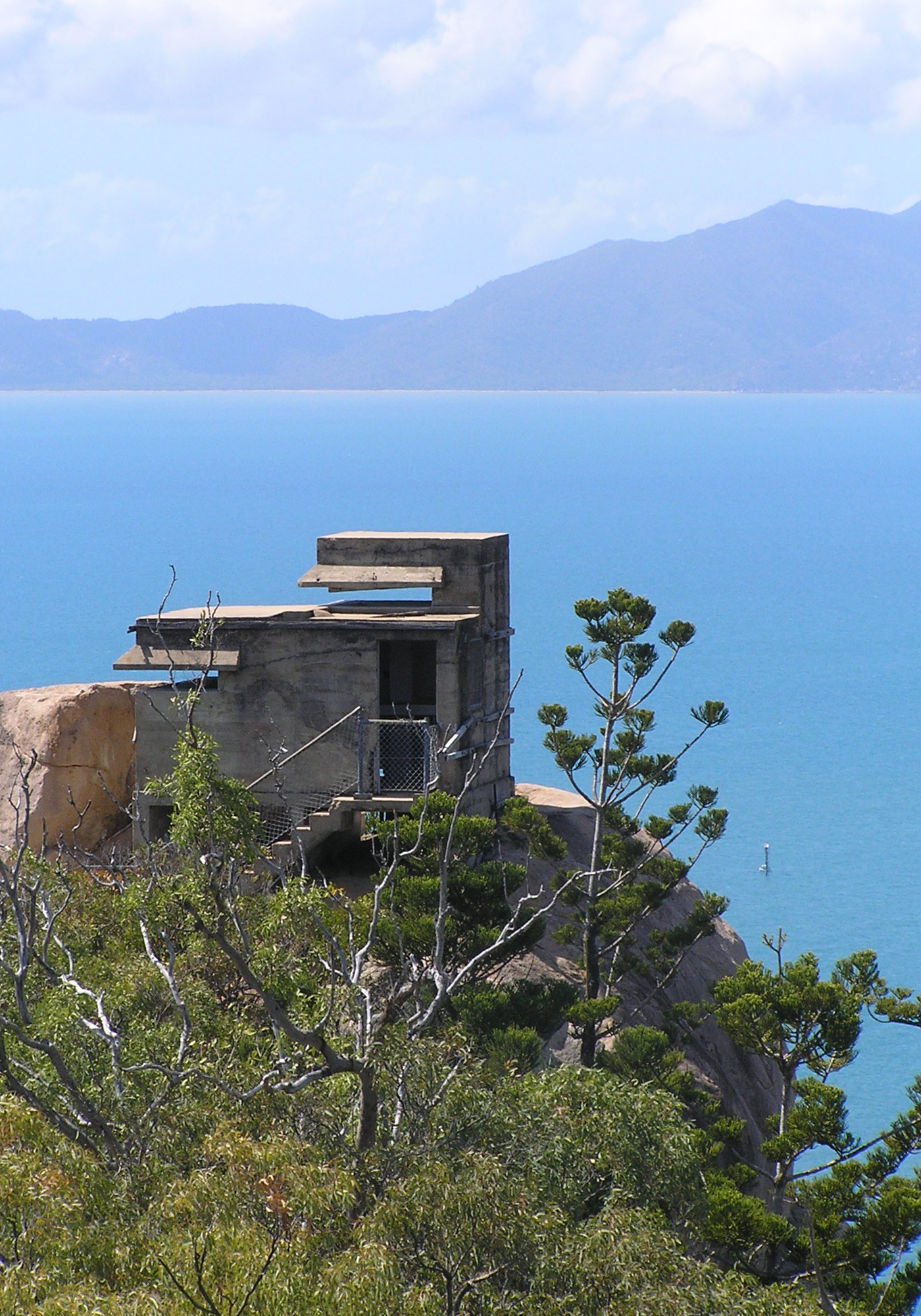
- Fort observation post, 2005

- Location within Queensland Location within Australia
- 19.1231°S 146.8706°E
- Location: Magnetic Island National Park, East side of Magnetic Island, City of Townsville, Queensland, Australia

History
- Design period: 1939–1945 (World War II)
- Built: 1943

Queensland Heritage Register
- Official name: Fort Complex Magnetic Island
- Type: state heritage (built, archaeological)
- Designated: 21 October 1992
- Reference no.: 600876
- Significant period: 1943 (fabric); 1943–1945 (historical)
- Significant components: pipeline – water, objects (movable) – defence, searchlight emplacement, radar station, magazine / explosives store, signal station/post, slab/s – concrete, command post, gun emplacement

The Fort Complex is a heritage-listed fortification at Magnetic Island National Park, east side of Magnetic Island, City of Townsville, Queensland, Australia. It was built in 1943. It was added to the Queensland Heritage Register on 21 October 1992.

== History ==
The fort complex was constructed in 1943 during World War II to protect the harbour and town from a feared Japanese invasion of Australia as Japanese forces moved south through the Pacific islands. Townsville was the major supply depot for Allied troops in the southeast Pacific and a staging post for troops moving north into the war zone.

The fortifications were armed with French 155 millimetres (6.1 in) M3 guns on Panama carriage mounts which were commonly used on a number of Pacific islands as coastal defence weapons. The four guns on Magnetic Island had been en route to Bataan until it fell to the Japanese. They were redirected to Townsville to protect its vital port against the expected rapid advance of the Japanese. History shows that they were not needed and after the war the guns were returned to the American forces.

At this time the fort was stripped of its fittings and left to return to nature. With the establishment of the Magnetic Island National Park, the Queensland National Parks and Wildlife Service assumed control of the complex, installed information signs and pathways and now administers the area.

== Description ==
The fort complex was built during 1943 on the eastern side of Magnetic Island between Horseshoe Bay and Arcadia Bay. It was anchored into granite boulders on a heavily timbered, mountainous point overlooking the Pacific Ocean.

The site contains derelict concrete structures with some timber and concrete remnants of the fabric such as the water pipeline, command post, searchlight tower, ammunition store, radar station, signal station, gun sites and direction finder. The remainder of the accommodation area can be seen in the form of concrete slabs on flat land near the pathway to the fort complex proper.

== Heritage listing ==
The Fort Complex on Magnetic Island was listed on the Queensland Heritage Register on 21 October 1992 having satisfied the following criteria.

The place is important in demonstrating the evolution or pattern of Queensland's history.

This is a significant site which highlights the role of Townsville and the region in the Allied struggle to protect Australia from the advancing Japanese forces during the crucial war years of 1942–43.

The place demonstrates rare, uncommon or endangered aspects of Queensland's cultural heritage.

Its significance is further highlighted because this site, together with those at Kissing Point, Townsville and on Cape Marlow at Pallarenda, are rare wartime fortifications of unique value.

The place is important in demonstrating a high degree of creative or technical achievement at a particular period.

Its construction on a rugged headland and the installation of the hugh guns were wartime engineering achievements of some magnitude.
