= Izzy's Koala World =

2020 documentary television series

- Genre: Documentary
- Starring: Izzy Bee
- Opening theme: "Rabbit!"
- Composers: Art Hays; Devin Moore
- Country of origin: Australia
- Original language: English
- No. of seasons: 2
- No. of episodes: 16

Production
- Executive producers: John Collin, Jr.; Suzanne Kolb; Izzie Lerer; Jared McGilliard
- Editor: Ross Laing
- Running time: 14–18 minutes
- Production company: Nomadica Films

Original release
- Network: Netflix
- Release: September 15, 2020 – April 20, 2021

Izzy's Koala World is a television docuseries starring Izzy Bee. Produced by Nomadica Films, the series premiered on September 15, 2020. A second season premiered on April 20, 2021.

== Premise ==
On Australia’s Magnetic Island teenage koala caretaker Izzy Bee and her family run a clinic from their home that rescues and rehabilitates injured and orphaned koalas.

== Cast ==
- Izzy Bee
- Ali Bee, Izzy's Mum and the Veterinarian who runs the clinic
- Tim Bee, Izzy's Dad who runs a beach hire business

== Episodes ==
Season	Episodes	Originally released
1	8	September 15, 2020
2	8	April 20, 2021

=== Season 1 (2020) ===
No. overall	No. in season	Title	Original release date
1	1	"Rosie's Rescue"	September 15, 2020
Izzy helps a koala named Rosie find a new home with lots of lush leaf to munch on—and the perfect spot might be right near Izzy's school!
2	2	"Baby Chompy"	September 15, 2020
Curious and cute Chompy was found without a mom, so Izzy has to do everything a mother would do for him in the wild to make sure he grows up strong.
3	3	"Leia Has a Cold"	September 15, 2020
An infection is going around, and Izzy's favorite koala Leia has the sniffles, sending Izzy and her mom to the mainland clinic to test if Leia is ill.
4	4	"Muffin Moves In"	September 15, 2020
Young female koalas like to hang together, so Izzy needs to find tiny two-year-old Muffin the perfect roommate. Which koala is the perfect match?
5	5	"Juliet's Release"	September 15, 2020
Green ants attacked Juliet's eyes and made them sore. But after a month under Izzy's care, she's ready to return to her koala family and friends.
6	6	"Twinkle's Rescue"	September 15, 2020
Twinkle got her name since she was found at night under the stars. To make her feel at home at the hospital, Izzy makes sure it smells like the wild.
7	7	"Leia's Ready for Release"	September 15, 2020
Koala friend Leia is ready to return to the wild, and Izzy wants to make sure she can choose the juiciest leaf and climb ropes before her release.
8	8	"Goodbye Leia"	September 15, 2020
Letting Leia go is like saying goodbye to her best friend. But Izzy knows that the wild has always been Leia's home—and where she belongs.

=== Season 2 (2021) ===
No. overall	No. in season	Title	Original release date
9	1	"Baby Koalas!"	April 20, 2021
With four baby koalas already under their care, Izzy’s family has their hands full! But they make room for one more after finding a baby without a mom.
10	2	"Flame's Rescue"	April 20, 2021
Smelling like smoke and covered in charcoal, Flame got her name because she was rescued from a fire. Izzy builds her a safe space to help her recover.
11	3	"Chompy Learns to Climb"	April 20, 2021
Izzy’s off to find the perfect tree shaped just like a fork so that baby koala Chompy can start learning how to climb and search for his own food.
12	4	"Earning StormBoy's Trust"	April 20, 2021
StormBoy and Izzy got off to a rough start after she hosed him with water while cleaning his pen. Will spending more time with him win back his trust?
13	5	"Friends Forever"	April 20, 2021
Cinderella and Muffin are koala besties, so Izzy and her friends scope out Golden Bay for the best spot to release them together back into the wild.
14	6	"Cheer Up, StormBoy"	April 20, 2021
StormBoy isn't quite ready to be released back into the wild. Could a bigger playpen — and a party to celebrate — be the perfect consolation prize?
15	7	"Henry's Home"	April 20, 2021
When a noticeably thin Henry comes back under Izzy's care, Izzy and her mom try to get him to eat and drink again to help him regain his strength.
16	8	"Chompy's Big Move"	April 20, 2021
Chompy has to put on some pounds and practice his tree-climbing skills in order to move into a bigger enclosure. Can Izzy help him get the job done?

== Release ==
The first season of Izzy's Koala World was released on September 15, 2020, on Netflix. It had been filmed a year prior, according to the 'Magnetic Island School'.
