= Mount Cook (Magnetic Island) =

Mountain on Magnetic Island, Australia

- Location within Queensland

Highest point
- Elevation: 493 m (1,617 ft)
- Coordinates: 19.1389°S 146.8287°E

Geography
- Location: Magnetic Island, Queensland, Australia

Mount Cook is a mountain located on Magnetic Island within the Magnetic Island National Park, off the north east coast of Queensland, Australia. Mount Cook rises 493 metres (1,617 ft) out of the Coral Sea and is the highest point on the Magnetic Island.

== See also ==
- List of mountains of Australia
