= Eustace Robert Hayles =

Australian entrepreneur (1843–1926)

Robert Hayles
- Born: 27 December 1843; London
- Died: 19 August 1926 (aged 82); Arcadia, Magnetic Island, Queensland, Australia
- Other names: Robert Hayles Sr.
- Known for: Establishing Hayles Magnetic Island Pty Ltd.

Robert Hayles (1843 in London – 1926 in Arcadia) was an Australian entrepreneur who formed a series of passenger and cargo ferry services in the north of Australia after 1889.

He moved to Australia aboard the sailing ship Nunda in 1861. Hayles worked in the mining and pastoral industries in Queensland before 1889 when he purchased a number of buildings and some land in Picnic Bay, Magnetic Island, Queensland, Australia. Hayles established a permanent tourist operation on Magnetic Island and in 1900 built the Picnic Bay Jetty, establishing a permanent passenger ferry service to Magnetic Island. Hayles's first ferry, the Bee, was wrecked during a storm in 1901 and Hayles commissioned the construction of a 22-passenger ferry, the Phoenix and later commissioned a similar ferry called the Magnet. In 1909, Hayles was granted creek-front land in Townsville to establish a permanent ferry terminal to assist in the operation of the Magnetic Island ferry service. In 1922 Hayles established Hayles Magnetic Island Pty. Ltd. and was appointed the Chairman of the company. In 1924, the company expanded to Cairns and established a regular mail and cargo service between Cairns and Cooktown. The company also established a Darwin office the same year and provided services for mission stations, lighthouses and remote settlements along the Victoria and Daly rivers.

Hayles family business continued to expand, offering fortnightly Cairns to Green Island services from 1928 onwards and in 1936 the company introduced Brisbane River cruises in Brisbane, Queensland. The Second World War had a serious impact on Hayles' business with vessels in his fleet requisitioned by the Australian military.

Eustace Robert (Bob) Hayles was one son who became involved in the business.
