= Magnetic Island =

Island off the coast of Queensland, Australia

Coordinates: 19°08′S 146°50′E

Magnetic Island (Yunbenun)
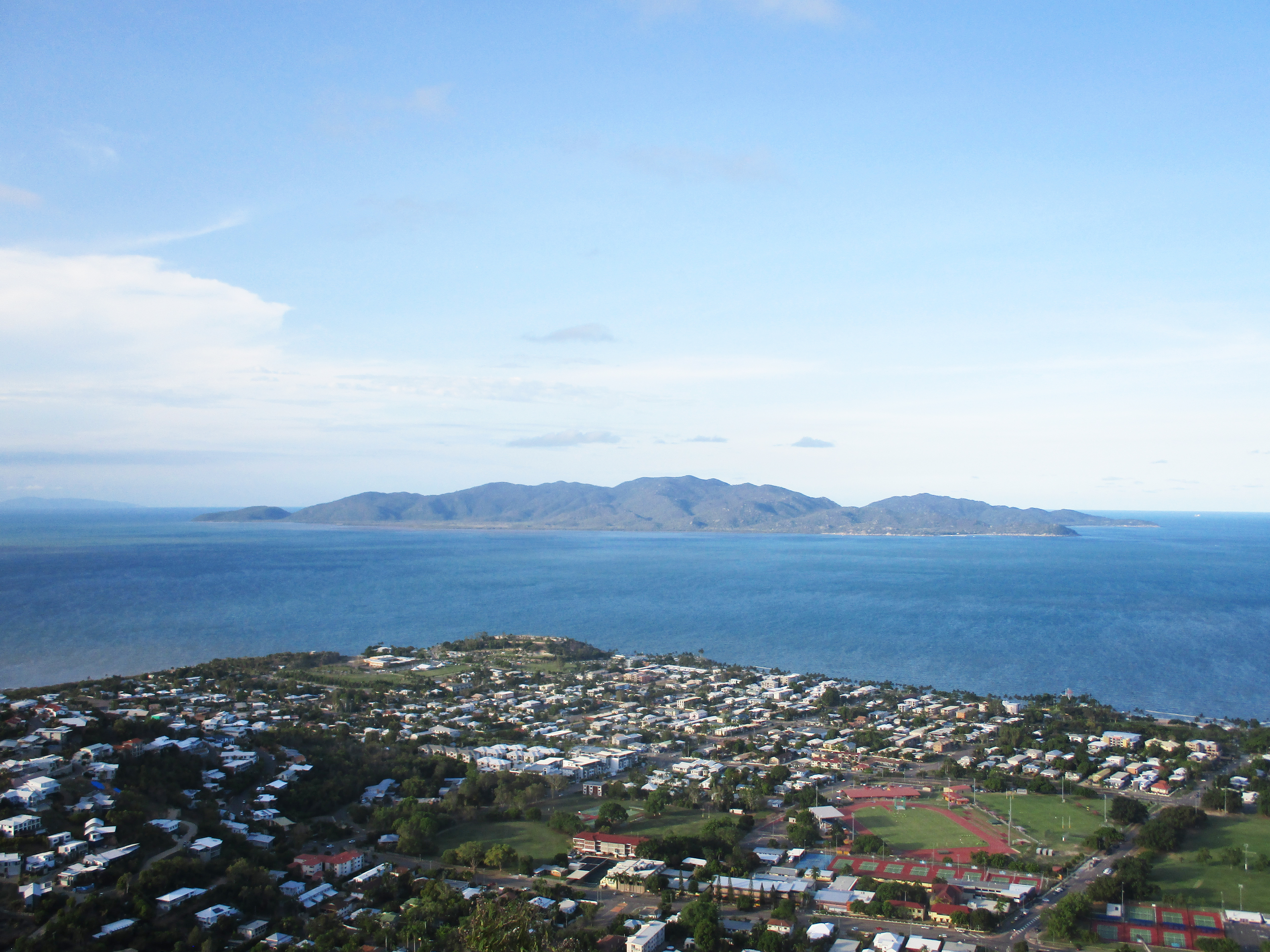
- The view of Magnetic Island from the Castle Hill, Townsville

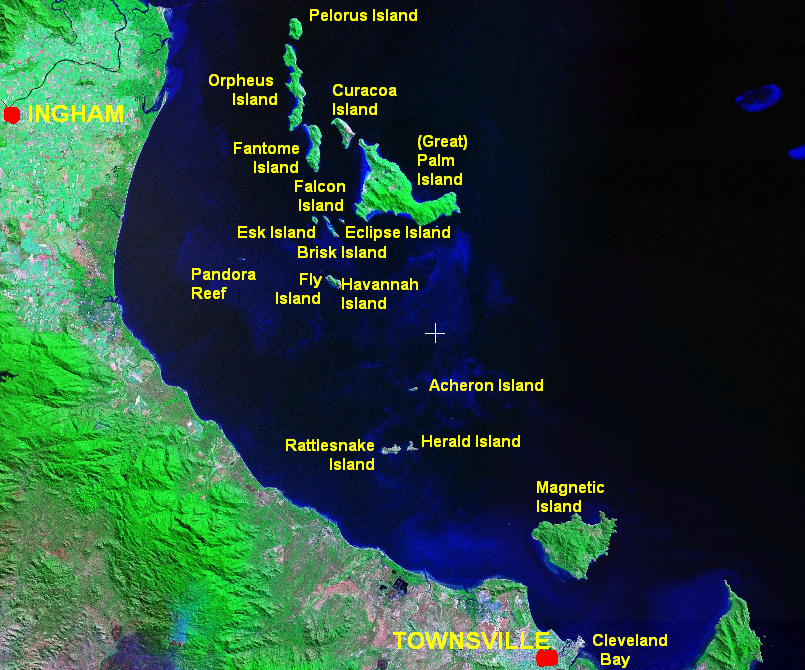
- Palm Islands location

Geography
- Location: Coral Sea
- Area: 52 km^{2} (20 sq mi)
- Highest elevation: 497 m (1631 ft)
- Highest point: Mount Cook

Administration
- Australia

Demographics
- Population: 2,475 (2021)
- Pop. density: 40/km^{2} (100/sq mi)

Magnetic Island (Wulguru: Yunbenun) is an island 8 kilometres (5 mi) offshore from the city of Townsville, Queensland, Australia. This 52 km^{2} (20.1 sq mi) mountainous island in Cleveland Bay has effectively become a suburb of Townsville. The island is accessible from Townsville Breakwater to Nelly Bay Harbour by ferry. There is a 39.5 km^{2} (15.3 sq mi) national park and bird sanctuary, and walking tracks can be taken both between the populated bays and to a number of tourist destinations, such as the World War II forts.

The island is a holiday destination, with many hotels and several resorts in operation to cater for all levels of service. The public facilities and infrastructure on the island are managed by the Townsville City Council. The island is part of the electoral district of Townsville in the Legislative Assembly of Queensland, and part of the federal seat of Herbert, which is represented by Phillip Thompson.

There are five settlements, namely Arcadia, Horseshoe Bay, Nelly Bay, Picnic Bay, and West Point. Geographic features include Rocky Bay, Picnic Bay and Hawkings Point, around its southern extremity, a bay, Nelly Bay to the east-north-east of Rocky Bay, followed by Geoffrey Bay, with Bremner Point as its northern arm. Horseshoe Bay is on the northern coast, and Cockle Bay Reef is off the western coast.

In the 2021 census, Magnetic Island had a population of 2,475 people.

== Naming ==
The Wulguru name for the island is Yunbenun. The first European accounts of the island come from Captain James Cook who, in 1770, while navigating the Australian coast, called the island "Magnetical Island", as a magnetic pull interfering with his vessel's compass appeared to emanate from the island. People have since explored the general area of Magnetic Island with various instruments to discover what might have caused the effect that Cook reported, but nothing has been discovered. Local names for the island are "Maggie Isle", "Maggie Island", or "The Island".

== History ==
=== Pre-European settlement ===
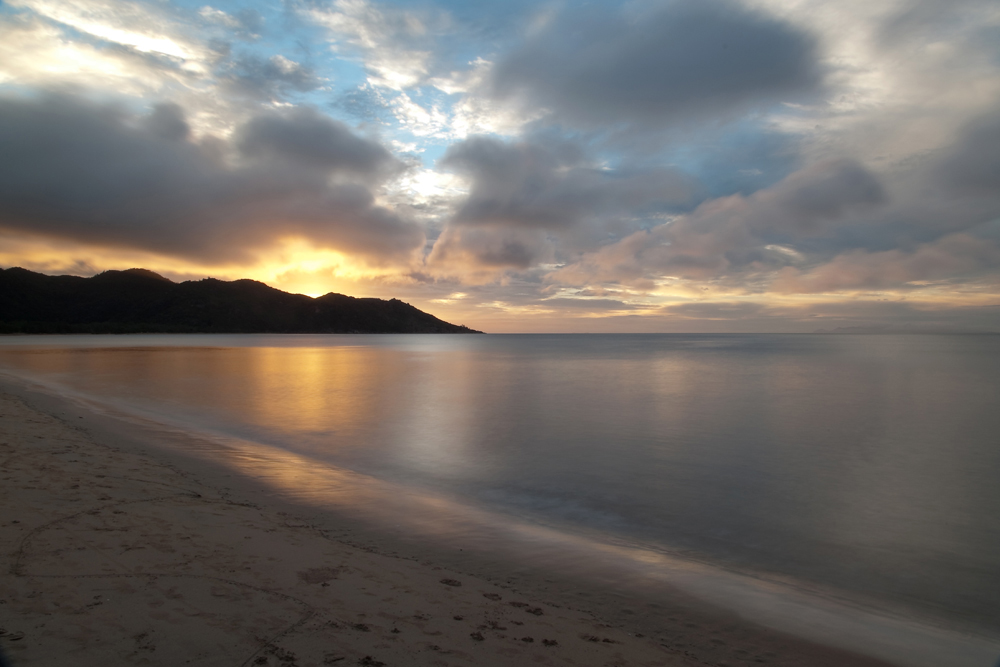
Sunset from Horseshoe Bay

Yunbenun is the traditional land of the Wulgurukaba people. It had a transient population of Aboriginal people well before European exploration of the area. They had seasonal camps at a number of bays, and travelled between the island and mainland using canoes. A number of Aboriginal burial sites are said to exist on the island, but have so far not been identified. Aboriginal middens and cave drawings can still be found in a number of bays around Yunbenun. Folklore of the local Wulguru tribe recounts a long association with the island and annual migrations to the mainland to avoid expeditions of head-hunters from Papua New Guinea and the Torres Strait, which used the northern trade winds to travel south along the Queensland coast. This head-hunting nearly ceased following the arrival of missionaries, led by Samuel MacFarlane to the Torres Straits in 1871.

=== European settlement and development ===
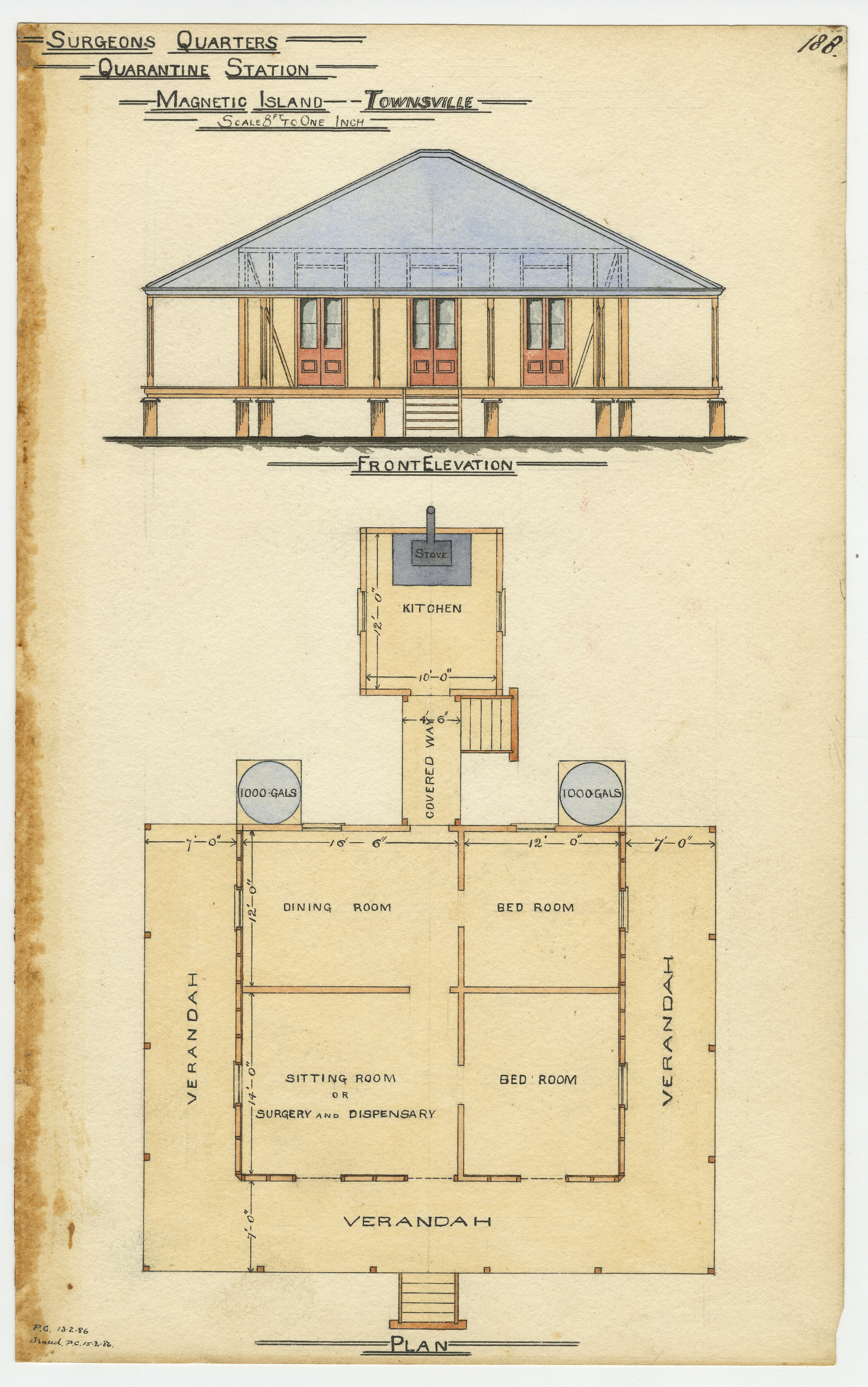
Plans for Surgeon's Quarters at the Quarantine Station, 1886

J.M. Black, funded by Robert Towns, founded the township of Townsville on the mainland nearby. As Townsville developed through the mid-19th century, Magnetic Island became a valuable location for the gathering of hoop pine and granite, the latter of which was used in the reclamation of land for the Port of Townsville, and for construction of Townsville's Customs House.

Picnic Bay was named after its popularity as a picnic spot for European tourists from the mainland during the 19th century, before Magnetic Island was first inhabited by Europeans. In the mid-19th century the island became a popular location for the collection of stone and coral needed for development on the mainland. Even substantial quantities of gold were mined in 1886.

In 1875, the island was set aside as a quarantine station although it took another ten years for the proper facilities to be set up at West Point. In November 1884 the Queensland Government accepted a tender from Leisner and Sparre to construct the quarantine station for £3645. It was only after the tender was accepted that the site on West Point on the north-west was actually chosen.

In 1896 Cyclone Sigma tore across the island and through Townsville. At least 23 people died, many buildings destroyed and boats wrecked. The ketch Lalla Rookh was torn off its moorings and found later on Magnetic Island. (She was able to be recovered and continued to carry loads of timber up and down the coast, until being wrecked off the Queensland coast in 1899.)

By 1890 a resort had been started in Picnic Bay. In 1898 Robert Hayles Sr was so impressed by the potential of Magnetic Island he sold his other interests to build a resort on the island. Hayles was responsible for much of the development of Magnetic Island through tourism. In 1901 he started a regular ferry service to the island with his ship the Bee. Twelve months later this ship was wrecked on the rocks at Nobby Head, Picnic Bay, and the Phoenix was built by Hayles' sons to replace the vessel. The Hayles company remained operating services to Magnetic Island with a large number of different vessels until 1988.

=== World War II ===
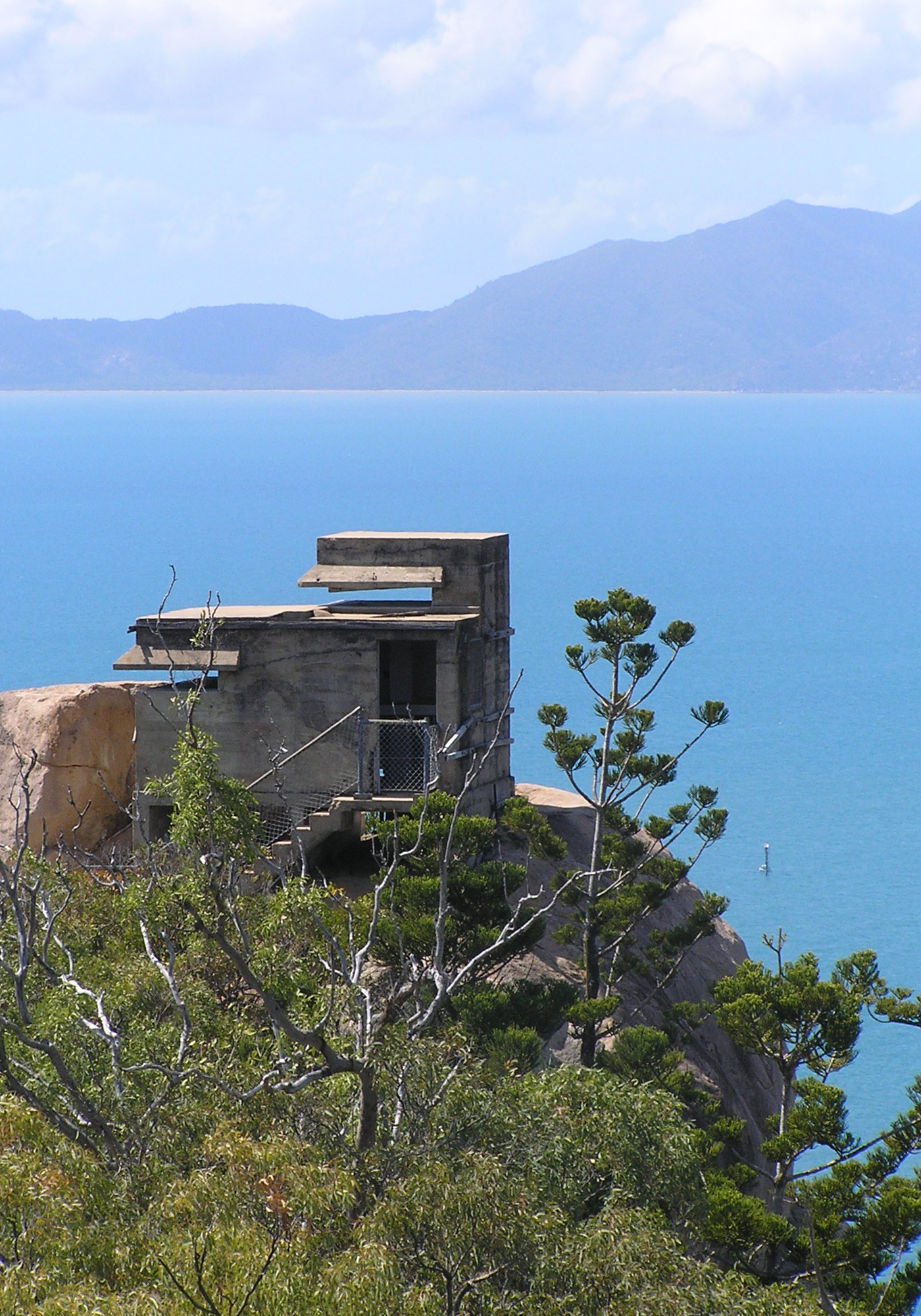
The observation post overlooking Cleveland Bay, "Magnetic Battery"

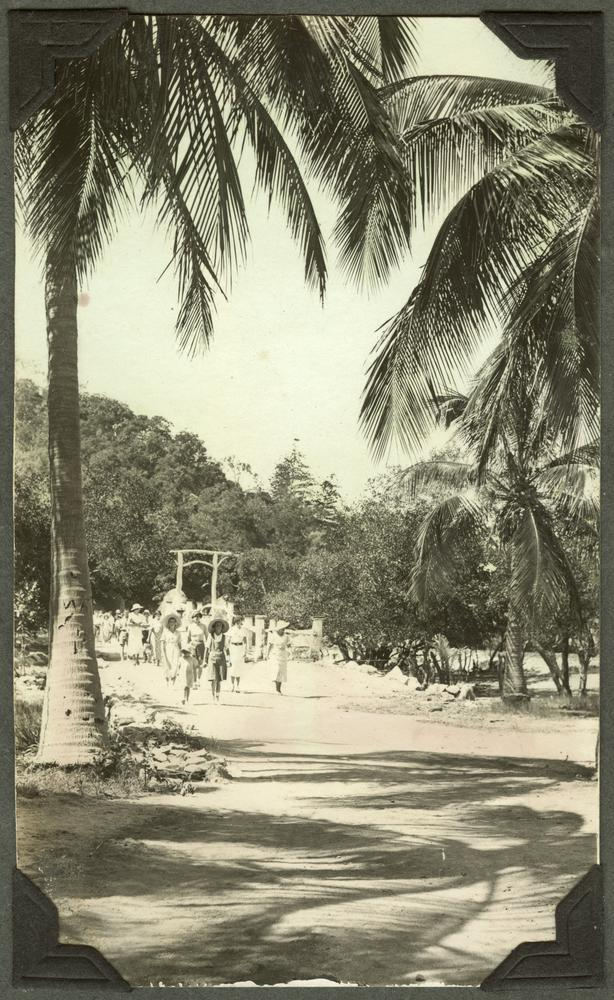
Tourists taking a walk through the palm groves on Magnetic Island, 1937–1938.

Magnetic Island became an important defensive position during World War II because of its proximity to Townsville, an important military base, and its views over Cleveland Bay, a significant anchorage and assembly point for large fleets and convoys operating in the south Pacific. As such, the Magnetic Battery, (AKA The Forts) an artillery battery and observation post, was built in the hinterland of Florence, Horseshoe and Arthur Bays. Picnic Bay also became a popular defence force rest and relaxation camp following the commandeering of a resort in the bay in 1939.

=== Post-war era ===
The island slowly expanded following the end of the Second World War. In 1953, Centaur House, a memorial convalescent and rest hostel for nurses, was officially opened in Geoffrey Bay.

In late December 1971 Cyclone Althea hit the North Queensland coast directly crossing Magnetic Island. The island, along with much of the mainland, was devastated with 90% of the island's houses damaged or destroyed, some simply lifted off their foundations and tossed into trees. The island, along with the mainland, soon recovered.

In July 2012, a six hectare (15 acre) section of the island was granted to the Wulgurukaba Yunbenun Aboriginal Corporation under freehold title and a further 55 hectare (135 acre) section under a Deed of Grant in Trust.

=== 21st century ===
In 2009, as part of the Q150 celebrations, the Magnetic Island was announced as one of the Q150 Icons of Queensland for its role as a "Natural attraction".

== Demographics ==
Historical population
Year	Pop.	±%
2006	2,107	—
2011	2,199	+4.4%
2016	2,335	+6.2%
2021	2,475	+6.0%
Source: Search Census data - Australian Bureau of Statistics

In the 2006 census, Magnetic Island had a population of 2,107 people.

In the 2011 census, Magnetic Island had a population of 2,199 people.

In the 2016 census, Magnetic Island had a population of 2,335 people.

In the 2021 census, Magnetic Island had a population of 2,475 people.

== Geography ==
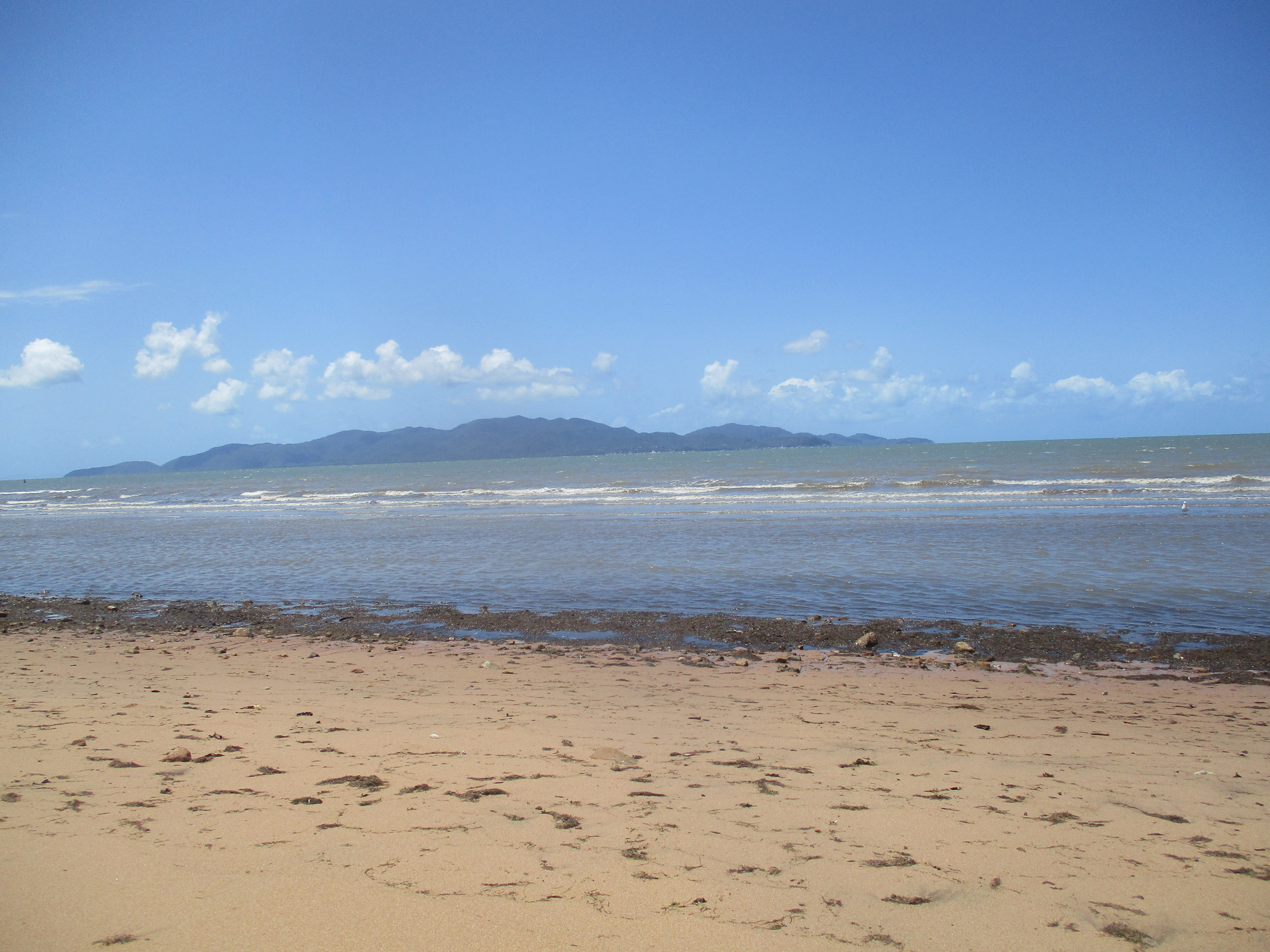
Magnetic island viewed from The Strand, Townsville.

Geographic features include Rocky Bay, Picnic Bay and Hawkings Point (around the settlement named Picnic Bay) around its southern point, a bay and settlement called Nelly Bay to the east-north-east, Horseshoe Bay on its northern coast, and Cockle Bay Reef off the western coast.

== Natural heritage and attractions ==
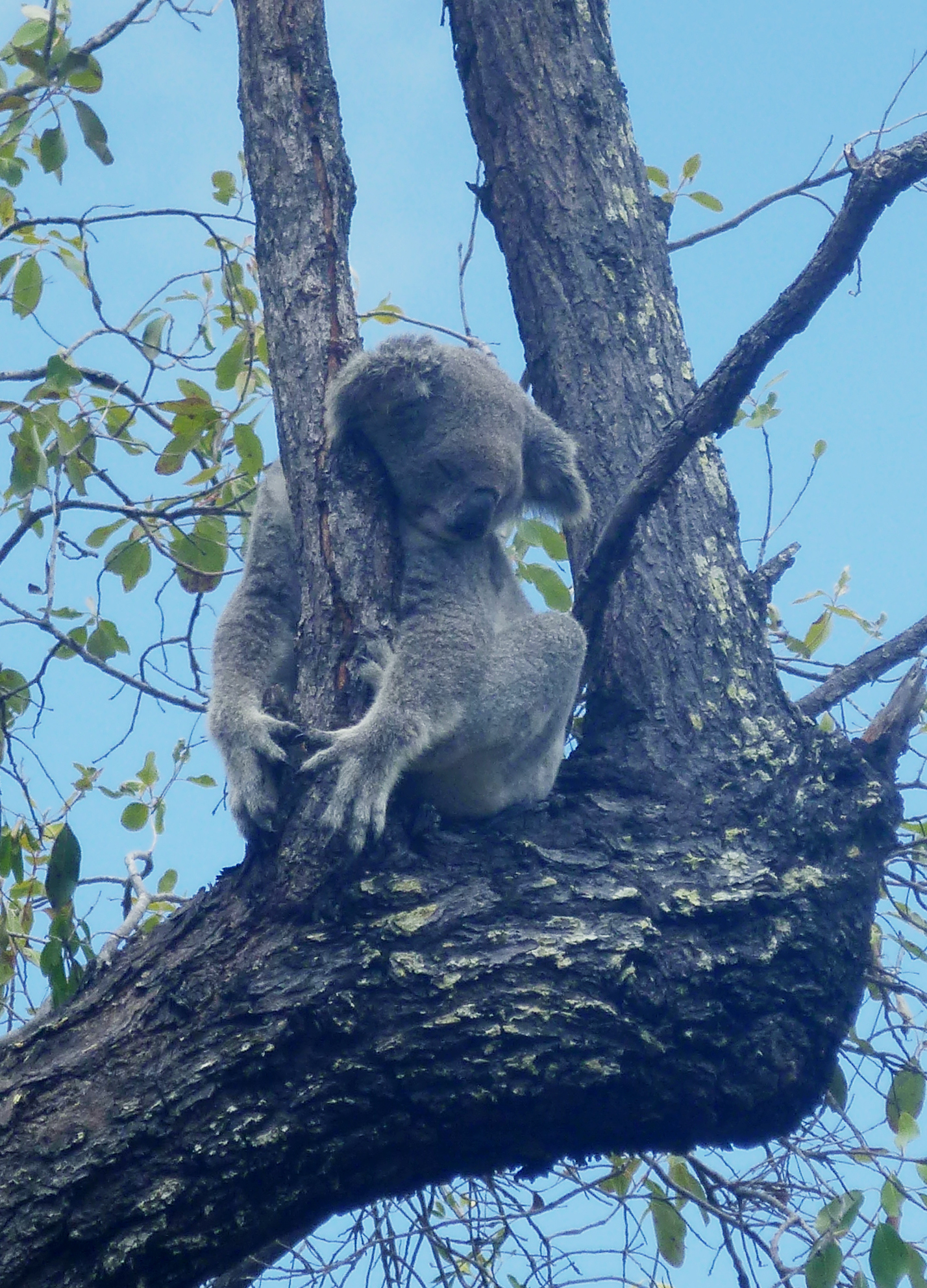
Koala taking a nap on a tree branch on a walking trail to the fort in Magnetic Island.

The island is a haven for wildlife. 76% of the island is Magnetic Island National Park, which is mostly located on the steep hilly interior and rugged north-western side. The highest point on the island is Mount Cook reaching 497 m (1,631 ft) above sea level. A citizen science project at Magnetic has over 3500 observations of 1126 species with the most observed species the koala and the most observed marine species the goldstripe butterflyfish.

Magnetic Island is famous for its fishing opportunities. Fish around the island include: mackerel, giant trevally, queenfish, coral trout, blackspot tuskfish, tuna, fingermark, red emperor and sea perch.

As of 2013, there are over 800 koalas estimated to be present on the island; this population represents the northern limit of their geographic range.

The areas of the island that are not covered by the conservation area are open for development subject to local authority approval. As of 2018 the island was undergoing an economic boom.

The wreckage of SS City of Adelaide is located off the shore of Cockle Bay, the island and is a popular tourist attraction.

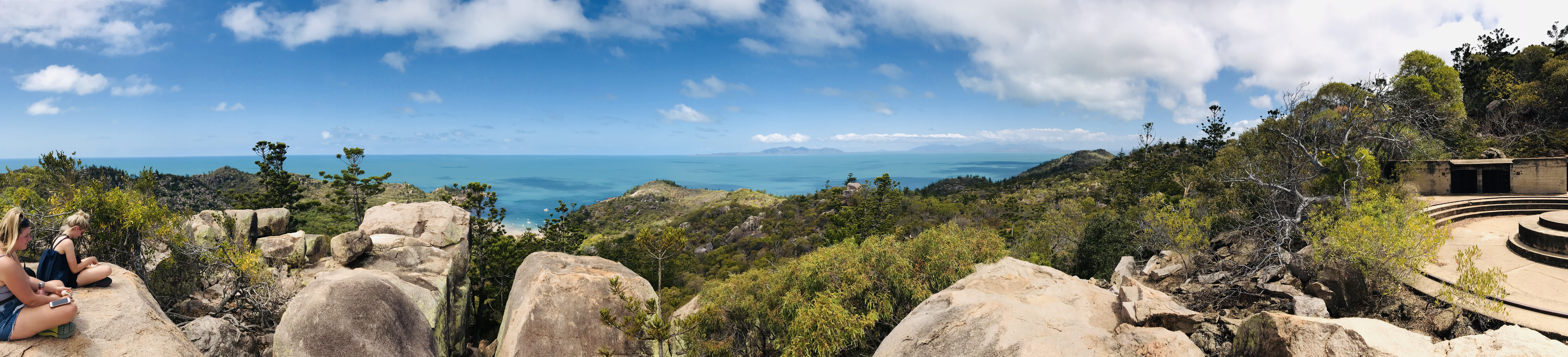
Panoramic view from the fort, Magnetic Island

== Settlements ==
The five villages of the island, which contain most of the population of 2107 (as of the census of population)

Place	Area (km^{2})	Population	Density
Horseshoe Bay	9.7	484	49.9
Arcadia	5.2	257	49.4
Nelly Bay	5.2	973	187.1
Picnic Bay	2.8	359	128.2
West Point	28.4	35	1.2
Magnetic Island	51.3	2107	41.1

== Heritage listings ==
Magnetic Island has a number of heritage-listed sites, including:

- East side of island: Fort Complex
- Esplanade: Picnic Bay Jetty

== Education ==
Magnetic Island State School is a government primary school at Nelly Bay. The nearest government secondary school is Townsville State High School in Railway Estate in the Townsville mainland.

== Community groups ==
The Magnetic Garbutt branch of the Queensland Country Women's Association meets at the CWA Hall at 42 Lancaster Street, Garbutt.

Other groups include:

- Magnetic Island Community Development Association (MICDA)
- Magnetic Island Nature Care Association (MINCA)
- Magnetic Island Fauna Care Organisation (MIFCO)
- Magnetic Island Network for Turtles (MINT)
- Magnetic Island Residents & Ratepayers Association (MIRRA)
- Magnetic Island Community Care (MICC)
- Magnetic Island Museum
- Magnetic Island RSL Sub-Branch
- Magnetic Island Rotary Club
- Magnetic Island Bowls Club
- Magnetic Island Country (Golf) Club
- Men's Shed Magnetic Island
- Tourism Magnetic Island
- U3A Magnetic Island

== Annual events ==
Annual events include:

- Mother's Day Classic (May)
- SeaLink Magnetic Island Race Week (August/September)
- The Great Island Trek (September)
- Maggie Island Triathlon (October)

To find out more visit whatsonmagneticisland.com.au

== Notable residents ==
- Julian Assange – WikiLeaks co-founder, sporadically lived the first years of his life in Nelly Bay with his mother in the early 1970s.
- Izzy Bee and family – Izzy's Koala World
- Breanna Koenen – captain of the Brisbane Lions in the AFLW
- Cara Koenen – Australian netballer playing for the Sunshine Coast Lightning in the Suncorp Super Netball League and the Australian Diamonds at the national level.

== See also ==
- List of islands of Australia
